= History of Dundalk F.C. (1966–2002) =

Dundalk
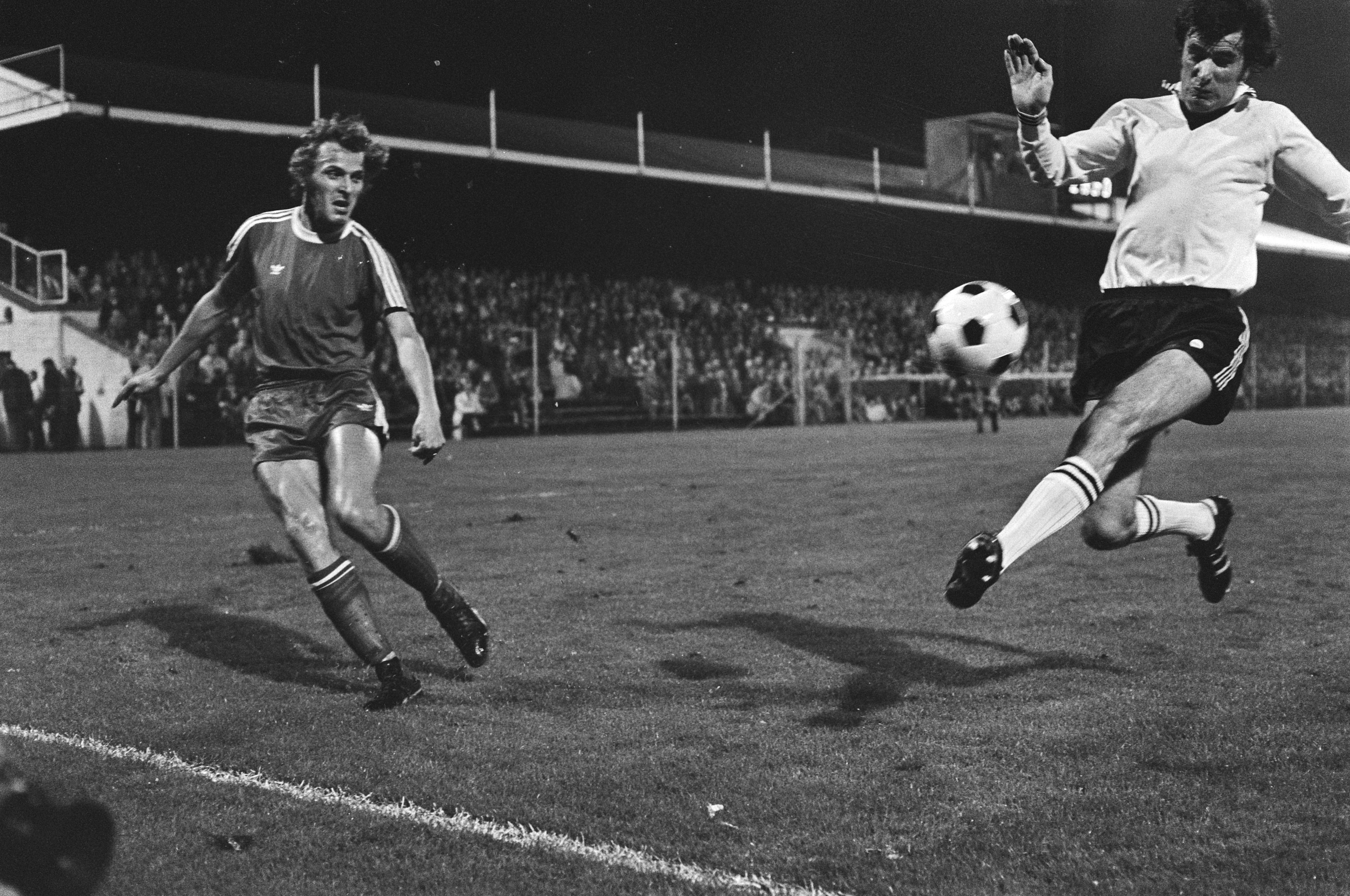
- Dundalk player-manager Jim McLaughlin in action away to PSV Eindhoven in 1976
- Founded: September 1903; 123 years ago as Dundalk G.N.R. Association Club
- League: League of Ireland Premier Division

The History of Dundalk Football Club (1966–2002) covers the period from the takeover of the club as a public limited company in January 1966 to the end of the 2001–02 season, when Dundalk won the FAI Cup, but were also relegated to the League of Ireland First Division. It also includes short articles about some of the events and people that are an integral part of that period in the club's history.

== Takeover and the Fox era (1966–1974) ==
A new Public Limited Company took the club over in January 1966, after the voluntary liquidation of the old company. The new board set about investing in Oriel Park, which consisted of turning the pitch 90 degrees, building a new stand and adding player and spectator facilities. They also invested in new players and a new player-manager, Alan Fox ahead of the start of the 1966–67 season. The pay-off was immediate. Dundalk finally won their first League of Ireland Shield after 40 years of League membership, in front of a record crowd of 14,000 for a domestic game in Oriel Park. Fox's side then followed up the Shield success by charging to the League title ahead of Bohemians by seven points, a huge margin in the days of two points for a win and 22 games. The club's third League title brought its only League and Shield Double. To cap a memorable season, they also won the Top Four Cup (their second and last before the competition was discontinued in 1974). In addition, they were runners-up in the Dublin City Cup and Leinster Senior Cup, so a semi-final defeat in the FAI Cup to Shamrock Rovers was the only slip-up that stopped the side winning medals in every competition. They called it "the greatest year in the history of Dundalk Football Club".

Early the following season Oriel Park hosted European football for the first time, under newly installed floodlights, with the visit of Vasas SC of Hungary. A huge crowd was "justifiably proud" at their club's achievement. But a breakdown in relationships scuppered the progress that had been made. Fox fell out with the board of directors during the trip for the return leg of the tie in Budapest, and was suspended, then reinstated. They failed to retain the Shield, finishing as runners-up. But the damage to relationships was done and, with the team still being on track to retain the League, Fox was released on 7 March 1968. His final success at Oriel Park was the Dublin City Cup of 1967–68. Less than three weeks later he was lining out for Limerick against Dundalk in a bad-tempered clash that resulted in Dundalk's players and officials being smuggled from the Markets Field as Gardaí held back a mob. Dundalk had led the League after 14 of the 22 matches, but Fox's departure saw them stumble to a runners-up spot behind a Waterford side that would go on to win a total of five titles in the next six seasons. 1968–69 started with a Fairs Cup win over DOS Utrecht, and a runners-up spot in the Shield for the second season in succession. But they failed to challenge in the League, finishing fourth. Another Dublin City Cup (the club's fifth and last before the competition was discontinued) was all that the remnants of Fox's team could achieve.

Future Ireland manager Liam Tuohy took over in the summer of 1969, after leaving Shamrock Rovers, and, as a result of his managerial experience, Dundalk entered the new decade at the top of the League, as they had 10-years earlier, having thrashed defending champions Waterford 6–1 in early December. But eight points from 12 games was a disastrous finish to the season, and highlighted just how much trouble the club was in. Due to the debts from the reconstruction of Oriel Park, he was obliged to thin the squad and slash the wage bill. While successful at blooding young players (despite youth policy being neglected since the takeover) it was too much to build a side able to sustain a title challenge. The 1971–72 Shield success would be the high point of his reign, and he quit at the end of that season, criticising a lack of local support in the process. His only other trophy at the club was the 1970–71 Leinster Senior Cup. He rejoined Shamrock Rovers a week later.

Dundalk had to sell or release more players (such as Tommy McConville and future manager Turlough O'Connor) to survive after Tuohy left. As a result, the club slid down the League, with a young, inexperienced squad finishing second from bottom in the table in 1972–73. The club's worst season since the 1950s had brought what became known as "Fox era" to a close. To recover the situation a new board took over the running of the club and hired English player-manager John Smith from Walsall. After renegotiating the club's debts the new board were able to provide him with the funds to sign a number of new players. There was a fast start to the new season, and a Leinster Senior Cup win over Bohemians in a replay, (the first match in Oriel was the first time the final had been contested outside Dublin in its 81-year history), but a run of 10 games without a win that winter meant they had to settle for a mid-table finish in the League. Following early exits the following season in the new League Cup competition, which had replaced the Shield, and the Leinster Cup, Smith quit only two matches into the 1974–75 League programme for a new job outside football.

== Jim McLaughlin era (1975–1983) ==
Smith's resignation paved the way for the appointment of Jim McLaughlin as player-manager on 20 November 1974, and it was under McLaughlin that Dundalk recovered and reached a new level of success. Despite a still-meagre playing budget, he won his first league title (the club's fourth) in 1975–76, finishing ahead of Finn Harps and losing only one match in the process. The season had seen a number of formerly successful clubs, such as Waterford, Cork Celtic and Cork Hibernians, all bring in fading stars from England – Bobby Charlton, George Best, Geoff Hurst and Rodney Marsh – in a bid to entice back the support they had lost as their fortunes had ebbed. Dundalk, needing no circus acts, clinched the title by beating Cork Hibernians at home in front of a packed Oriel Park with a game to spare. The title brought European football back to the town for the first time since 1969, and in the following season's European Cup they met PSV Eindhoven, and were deemed unlucky to only draw the first leg in Oriel Park. That match started an unbeaten run in Europe in Oriel Park of eight matches over the following five seasons. They went on to win that season's FAI Cup – the club's first since 1958 – when they defeated Limerick United in the 1977 final, a week after winning the Leinster Senior Cup.

League form had been mixed in the two seasons following the title, and a bad end to the 1977–78 season (with only one win from the final 11 games in all competitions) led to rumours that McLaughlin would be let go, despite retaining the Leinster Cup, and winning their first League Cup in a penalty shoot-out over Cork Alberts. Instead, the club supported the "reorganisation" he demanded, and used funds from the sale of three players (Synan Braddish, Derek Carroll and Brian Duff) to Liverpool, for a combined £55,000, to rebuild the squad and make ground improvements at Oriel. From Christmas Eve 1978 on, his new look side dropped only three points on their way to the winning the title. It was confirmed in slightly surreal fashion – with a win away to Cork Celtic (who were about to be expelled from the League) in front of 200 people; while the trophy was presented in Oriel Park 48 hours later after a defeat to FAI Cup final opponents Waterford. 12 days later Dundalk defeated Waterford in the 1979 FAI Cup Final, thereby completing the club's first League and Cup Double. The Double winning side's 1979–80 European Cup run, where they narrowly missed out on qualifying for the quarter-finals (losing 3–2 on aggregate to Celtic in front of Oriel's record attendance), was the club's best European performance until 2016.

Dundalk couldn't keep up with runaway leaders Athlone Town in 1980–81, finishing as runners-up for a consecutive season, but they achieved their only domestic cup double by beating Galway Rovers in the 1981 League of Ireland Cup Final, and Sligo Rovers in the 1981 FAI Cup Final. McLaughlin's third and final league title at the club arrived in 1981–82, sealed on the final day away to defending champions Athlone, after an early season 10-point gap to Bohemians had been overhauled. But it was Bohemians that came out of a four match, seven and a half hour FAI Cup semi-final marathon, depriving him of a shot at a second League and Cup Double. A trophy-less 1982–83 season, however, in which Dundalk slipped to third behind Louth rivals Drogheda United in the league table (and missed out on Europe), signalled that the team was entering a transition period. But, to the shock of Dundalk's board and fans, McLaughlin resigned in June 1983, saying he needed a change. He would replace John Giles at Shamrock Rovers a week later.

== Turlough O'Connor era (1985–1993) ==
McLaughlin's sudden departure lead to two seasons in mid-table before the club sorted itself out. First, former Ireland international John Dempsey was hired, suspended, and fired, within an eight-month period. He was then replaced by McLaughlin's long-term assistant and club coach, Tommy Connolly, for 14-months. But they continued to languish in the League. Subsequently, former Dundalk player Turlough O'Connor was appointed as manager of the club ahead of the League's split into two divisions in 1985–86. O'Connor had been Jim McLaughlin's main managerial rival for honours in the early 1980s, winning two League titles and three League Cups with Athlone Town. He now had to rebuild the team following the departure over the previous two years of almost all the players McLaughlin had left behind, when a lot of money had been wasted on replacements that hadn't worked out. But O'Connor quickly built a squad capable of challenging for honours and, over the following eight seasons, his sides consistently finished in the top four.

After winning the League Cup in 1986–87, his first trophy as manager at Oriel, Dundalk finished as runners-up in both the League and the FAI Cup, qualifying for Europe for the first time in five years. The following season started with a visit from Cup Winners' Cup holders Ajax Amsterdam, (many of whose players would be in the Dutch squad that would win Euro '88), and ended with the club's second League and Cup Double - breaking four seasons of Shamrock Rovers hegemony. It was closer than perhaps necessary, with a winless streak of five matches in March threatening to derail their title hopes. But a televised 1–1 draw in the "emotion charged atmosphere of Oriel Park", against fellow title challengers St Patrick's Athletic, sealed the League title. Ten days later, at the end of an eight match cup journey, they won the 1988 FAI Cup Final against Jim McLaughlin's Derry City. Crowds estimated in the thousands welcomed the team back to Dundalk the night of the Cup final victory.

O'Connor won his second League Cup in 1989–90, with the club's newest rivals Derry City being beaten in Oriel Park on penalties, and his second League title at Dundalk followed in 1990–91 in an end of season, winner takes all match in Turner's Cross against Cork City, the winning goal being scored by cult hero Tom McNulty. But they spurned an opportunity to progress in the European Cup, when a 1–1 draw away to Honved was followed by a 0–2 home defeat. Attendances started to drop noticeably during 1992–93, as the growth of the new F.A. Premiership, and its hugely successful tie-in with Sky Sports, impacted attendances across the League of Ireland. Furthermore, the club's supporters, sated by two decades of success and unhappy with a conservative playing-style that contrasted badly with what people were seeing on their televisions, were only turning up for the 'big' games, contributing to the worsening financial position. By the end of the season the board was facing financial issues that threatened the club's survival – a "healthy" surplus in 1989 had become a serious deficit, with income falling due to some of the lowest gates in memory. In addition, eight players that started that season's FAI Cup Final were aged over 30, suggesting a squad overhaul was required when the club could no longer afford it.

== Decline and relegation (1993–2002) ==
The 1993–94 season started with mixed results, with good away victories being followed by defeats at home, and, after a home defeat to Monaghan United (during which he was abused by a section of the crowd), O'Connor resigned. He was replaced by another former player – Jim McLaughlin protege Dermot Keely, who had won the Double in 1979 under McLaughlin at Oriel. A lot of the older players had already departed, and a thin squad struggled – missing out on the "Top Six" round-robin format that decided the title, and playing out the final third of the season in a meaningless "bottom six" round-robin in front of tiny crowds, which contributed to the worsening financial position. Early the following season the financial issues came to a head, and a number of local businessmen formed a new Interim Company to take the club (and its liabilities) over, saving it from bankruptcy.

Attendances had remained very low, and, having had a preference for Sunday afternoon matches for decades, the new board decided League of Ireland football could no longer compete with live English Premier League matches, so home matches were moved to Thursday nights in an effort to boost gates. Meanwhile, a first-team squad that lacked depth and experience had started the season poorly, but a steady improvement in results saw them climb the league table. With seven games to go as many as eight clubs were in contention, but Dundalk were the most consistent, and Keely steered his team to a ninth league title on a final day of drama. They defeated Galway United at home, then, with players and supporters waiting on the pitch to hear the results of Shelbourne's and Derry City's matches, news filtered through that both had failed to win, confirming Dundalk as Champions.

In 20 seasons between 1975 and 1995 the club had won a combined total of 14 league titles, FAI Cups and League Cups, and had competed regularly in Europe. But the 1994–95 title success could not halt the decline. An indifferent start to the 1995–96 season was followed by a run that had Dundalk one point off the top halfway through the League program before Christmas, but it would be a long time before they would be that high in the table again. A series of injuries, defeats, and an FAI Cup exit to Drogheda United, saw Keely quit - frustrated at being unable to strengthen his squad. The club hired player-manager John Hewitt ahead of the 1996–97 season, but he was gone before March with his team stuck in the bottom three. They managed to survive a promotion/relegation play-off with Waterford United, but it only prolonged the inevitable.

After caretaker-manager Eddie May changed his mind about a permanent contract on the eve of the 1997–98 season, the club turned to Jim McLaughlin (who had retired from management and joined the board) to come out of retirement and try to turn things around. Alongside club stalwart Tommy Connolly, McLaughlin managed to deliver a safe mid-table finish, which was finished off with a televised final day victory over Shelbourne that handed the title to St. Patrick's Athletic. But the financial issues reared their head again and, the night of a morale-boosting victory over defending champions St. Patrick's Athletic at the end of November in the 1998–99 season, the whole squad was transfer listed. After the departure of a number of first-team players, those left behind managed a mid-season rise up the table. But an end of season collapse saw the club drop from the top-tier for the first time. Relegation was confirmed following a home defeat to UCD, 20 years to the day after the club had won its first Double, bringing an end to McLaughlin's management career.

With a supporters' Co-Op due to take over the club, some optimism had returned, and initial expectations were of an immediate return to the top flight. Under the old board's last managerial appointment - former player Terry Eviston - they recovered from a poor start to the 1999–2000 season, but became embroiled in a losing battle with the league's hierarchy and Kilkenny City, which reached the High Court, over the latter playing an improperly registered player. The new board replaced Eviston with their own man - another former player, Martin Murray. With a lot of player investment, the club was promoted as First Division Champions in 2000–01. Despite seeming well-equipped for the return to the top-flight, they were relegated again the following season from 10th place, due to a decision to reduce the number of teams in the Premier Division from 12 to 10, which immediately put a strain on the Co-Op's plans to grow the club. Despite this setback, they won the club's ninth FAI Cup a week later, with victory over Bohemians in the 2002 FAI Cup Final.

== The anatomy of Dundalk: a history in stubs ==
=== Battle of Oriel Park ===
The European highlight of McLaughlin's time at the club was the 1979–80 European Cup, his Double winning side narrowly missing out on qualifying for the quarter-finals (going down 3–2 on aggregate to Celtic in front of Oriel Park's record attendance). Before that, in the preliminary round, they were drawn to face Linfield of Belfast. The tie occurred at the height of The Troubles, and officials at both clubs had feared the potential for violence. The Belfast club's management committee had issued a directive to its 5,000 travelling support, which had, as its basic theme, "behave in a dignified manner". In advance of the first leg the two clubs had co-operated in mounting a major security operation, but the subsequent rioting was of a scale that overwhelmed Oriel Park and its police presence. Before the game even started, there was fighting and stone-throwing on the terraces and around the ground. Extra riot police were called in to help quell the trouble, but it continued throughout the match. There were numerous pitch invasions, followed by baton charges by police, despite the efforts of Linfield's players and coaching staff to persuade their fans to desist.

In the match itself, Linfield took an early second half lead through Warren Feeney, with Dundalk equalising in the 80th minute through Liam Devine. From there the game finished 1–1, the players sensing that playing out time was the safest option for all concerned. Linfield were punished by UEFA for the actions of their supporters by being banned from playing their home-leg in Belfast, and being forced to pay for damage to Oriel Park and Dundalk's expenses for the return leg. That return leg was played behind closed doors in Haarlem in the Netherlands, with Dundalk winning 2-0 (3-1 on aggregate) to go through to play Hibernians of Malta in the First Round proper.

=== Dunfield ===
In 1999, 20 years after the violence that had marred their European Cup tie in Oriel Park, Dundalk and Linfield started a 12-month cross-border youth football project called 'Dunfield', which was largely funded by Co-operation Ireland as part of its sponsorship of reconciliation efforts in the aftermath of the Good Friday Agreement. The clubs, who had always been on good terms going back to the 1920s, even after the events of 1979, ensured the project was so successful that it was extended for another 12 months in 2000.

=== The Carter Affair ===
In mid-November 1999, Kilkenny City defeated Limerick by 3 goals to 2. Making his debut for Kilkenny in that First Division match was Fran Carter. It subsequently transpired that Carter had been improperly registered, with his signature being forged on the registration form by Kilkenny's manager, Pat Byrne, to ensure it could be submitted on time for Carter to make his debut. They were docked three points for fielding an ineligible player when the forgery was noticed. Kilkenny protested that Byrne had Carter's permission to sign his name for him, and threatened to resort to the law courts to have the punishment rescinded. The Vice-President of the FAI, Milo Corcoran, acting as an arbitrator, ruled that the points deduction should be cancelled and the game replayed instead. No provision for his decision to have the match replayed existed in the League's rules. Furthermore, the decision was made two weeks before the end of the League season, with Dundalk and Kilkenny duelling for the promotion/relegation play-off spot in the First Division. Therefore, Kilkenny were essentially awarded an end-of-season game in hand against a team that were, by that stage, bottom of the table. They won the replayed match, and pipped Dundalk to the play-off spot by one point as a result. Dundalk took a case to the High Court on the basis that the three-point deduction was the prescribed sanction for fielding an ineligible player, whereas Corcoran's decision had no basis in the League's rules. Instead the High Court judge ruled that, as the rules did not state that a player must personally sign his registration form, Carter had been properly registered when Byrne signed Carter's name. Therefore, he had not been ineligible for the original match, and the original 3–2 result should be reinstated. Kilkenny went on to secure promotion by defeating Waterford United in the play-off. However the following season they could only win nine points from 33 matches and were relegated. They eventually resigned from the League in 2008.

== The names heard long ago ==
=== Brian & Tommy McConville ===
Brian McConville (1943–1978) and Tommy McConville (1946–2013) were Dundalk stalwarts, local men who between them managed exactly 800 appearances for the club. Brian joined the club from junior football in 1964, but left during the 'Fox era'. He returned under Liam Tuohy during the lean years of the early 1970s and won Shield and Leinster Senior Cup medals. He left again when John Smith took over, but, at 32, was invited back by Jim McLaughlin and became a key member and captain of the squad that won the League in 1975–76 and FAI Cup in 1977. He died suddenly of a heart attack a short time after returning home from a match in Richmond Park at the end of January in the 1977–78 season. A benefit match for his wife and four young children was held at the end of March that year, in which a John Giles XI played a Jim McLaughlin XI in front of an enormous crowd in Oriel Park.

Brian's younger brother Tommy is the club's record holder for appearances. In total he spent part or all of 17 seasons at Dundalk between 1964 and 1986. In that time he won all the honours available in the Irish domestic game for the club, played in Dundalk's golden period in European football (including the match against Celtic where he famously missed a late chance to win the tie) and was voted SWAI Personality of the Year in 1982. Due to the debt crisis of the early 1970s Dundalk had to sell McConville to Waterford, where he also picked up League and League Cup medals as well as five of his six Irish caps. But he returned to Oriel (via Shamrock Rovers) ahead of McLaughlin's first League-winning season, after McLaughlin persuaded the board to raise the transfer fee form their personal funds. He went on to become a mainstay of the McLaughlin era before leaving at the end of Turlough O'Connor's first season in charge to become player-manager at Finn Harps. He died in 2013 aged 67, in Dundalk, after a long illness.

=== Three little birds ===
The 'McLaughlin era' was marked by the untimely deaths of three Dundalk players. In addition to Brian McConville's death aged 35 in January 1978, Seán McLoughlin died at the age of 21 in August 1976, and Liam Devine died at the age of 29 in October 1980. McLoughlin, who had been signed by Jim McLaughlin a year earlier and had become a key figure in central midfield alongside fellow Derryman Seamus McDowell, was killed in a car accident in his native Derry. He had been due to play for Dundalk in a friendly against Italian champions Torino on the same night, but had requested the night off. The highlight of his season at the club was a two-goal salvo against Cork Celtic the previous February, which had wowed the home crowd and sent Dundalk top of the table, and on their way to McLaughlin's first League title as manager.

Liam Devine had been diagnosed with terminal cancer in March 1980, a few weeks after being injured in what would turn out to be his final match. On 2 September 1980 a Dundalk Selection played a Soccer Writers 'Team of the Year' XI in a benefit match for him and his family. He died five weeks later. Devine had been signed by McLaughlin from Shelbourne ahead of the 1978–79 Double-winning season, and was Dundalk's goalscorer in the infamous European Cup tie against Linfield in Oriel Park the following season. He was an ever present in the side right up until falling ill, and was extremely popular at the club, so the shock of his diagnosis and his absence from the pitch contributed to a mid-season wobble that saw Dundalk slip to a runners-up spot behind eventual League winners Limerick United.

=== Barry Kehoe ===
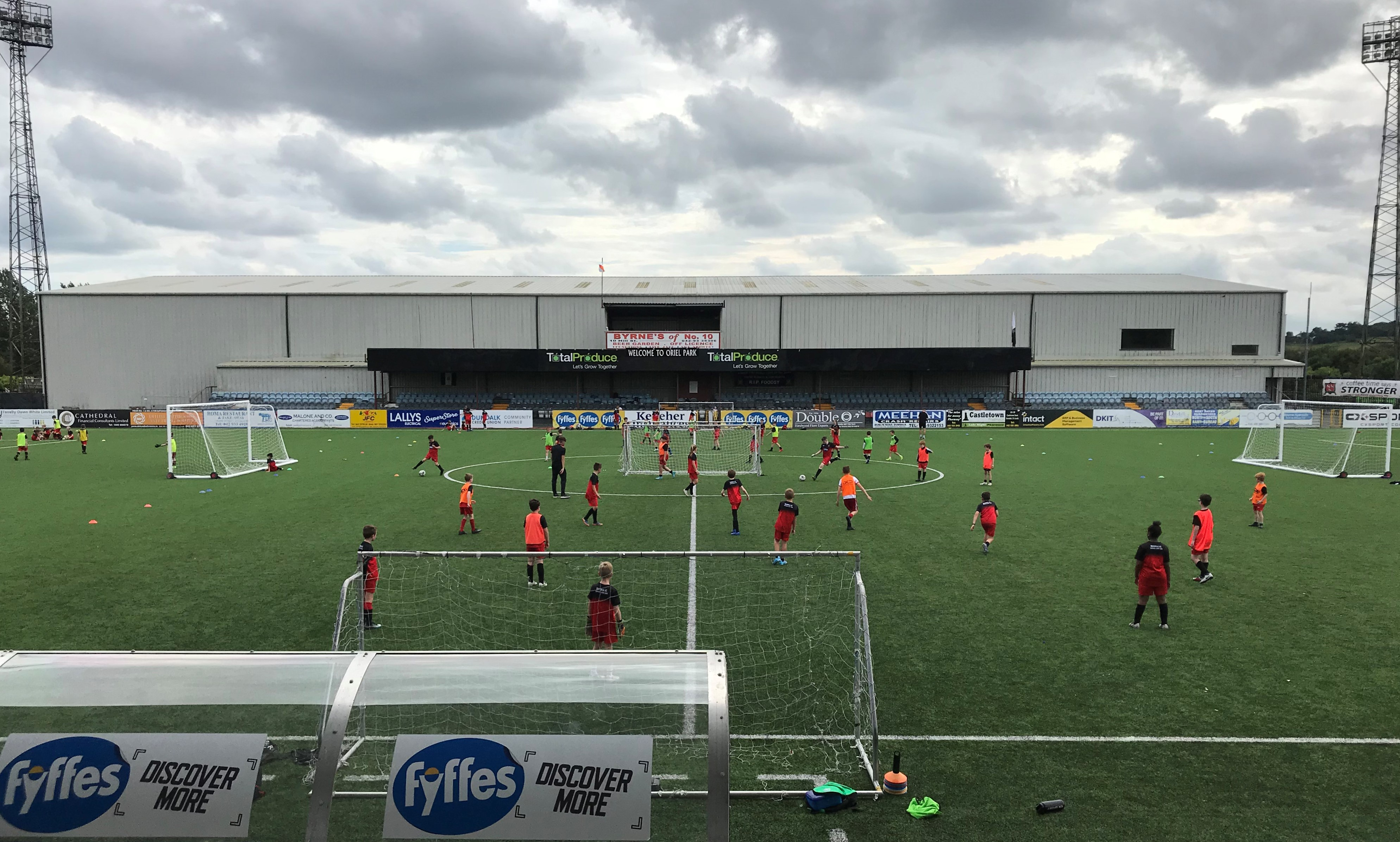
Barry Kehoe Summer Camp, 2019

Barry Kehoe (1962–2002) was called the most talented footballer to come out of Dundalk in half a century. He made 251 appearances for the club during the 1980s, scoring 40 goals from midfield. Barry was given his debut by Jim McLaughlin and was an ever-present in the 1981–82 League winning side. But in 1983, aged just 20, he was diagnosed with cancer, yet he fought his way back to fitness to become a key member of Turlough O'Connor's side that won the League and Cup Double in 1987–88. But within 12 months illness had struck again, with Barry requiring both heart surgery and additional chemotherapy. In response Dundalk and the FAI granted him a Special Testimonial, in which a Jack Charlton Selection of Irish internationals played Barry's own selection in Oriel Park on 5 June 1989 in front of 6,000 supporters. Barry recovered from illness again, and went on to play League football with Drogheda United until 1996. He also became a successful businessman in Dundalk. Kehoe died in October 2002, aged 40. Dundalk Football Club continues to honour his memory, naming the club's annual summer academies for children the 'Barry Kehoe Summer Camp'.

=== Martin Lawlor ===
Just ten matches short of Tommy McConville's club record for appearances of 580, Martin Lawlor (born 1 March 1958) holds Dundalk's club records for: longest unbroken service (14 seasons, 1977–1991), League appearances (400), FAI Cup appearances (56), League Cup appearances (56), joint-most League winner's medals (5), joint-most FAI Cup winner's medals (3), and most League Cup winner's medals (3). Lawlor is also the only player to have been a member of both Jim McLaughlin's and Turlough O'Connor's Double-winning sides. He was honoured with a testimonial against Chelsea in 1986, and in match programme notes written by former colleague Dermot Keely (who would later be his final manager at Dundalk) he was called "the best left-full in the League" and a "credit to football". His brothers Mick and Robbie, and his father Kit, also played for Dundalk.

=== Martin Murray ===
Martin Murray (born 6 October 1958), is one of only four men to both win honours with Dundalk as a player and later return to lead the club to trophy success as manager (the others being Gerry McCourt, Turlough O'Connor, and Dermot Keely). Murray made 218 appearances for the club in six seasons between 1984 and 1990 (usually in the playmaking midfield role), scoring 29 goals. He won League, FAI Cup and League Cup medals under Turlough O'Connor and was Irish Independent 'Sports Star of the Week' for his performance in the 1988 final against Derry City. However, for his whole playing career of over 20-years, Murray had coped with a faulty aortic valve, diagnosed when he was 19 and a player at Everton. At the end of his playing career he had the required surgery, and turned to management after he recovered. Following a season with Crusaders in Northern Ireland, he took over at Dundalk going into the club's second season in the First Division. At the first time of asking he won promotion for the club as First Division Champions. Stepping back into the Premier Division with a blend of local players and experienced pros proved too challenging the following season, with three clubs being relegated automatically - Dundalk missing out on safety by a solitary point. But the club was on a memorable cup-run, and, having dispatched Shamrock Rovers on a 4–0 scoreline in Oriel Park in the semi-final to delirious scenes, Murray lead Dundalk to the club's ninth FAI Cup win over a Bohemians side managed by Stephen Kenny - only a week after relegation had been confirmed. Murray resigned early the following season and stepped away from the League of Ireland.
