= List of Dundalk F.C. seasons =

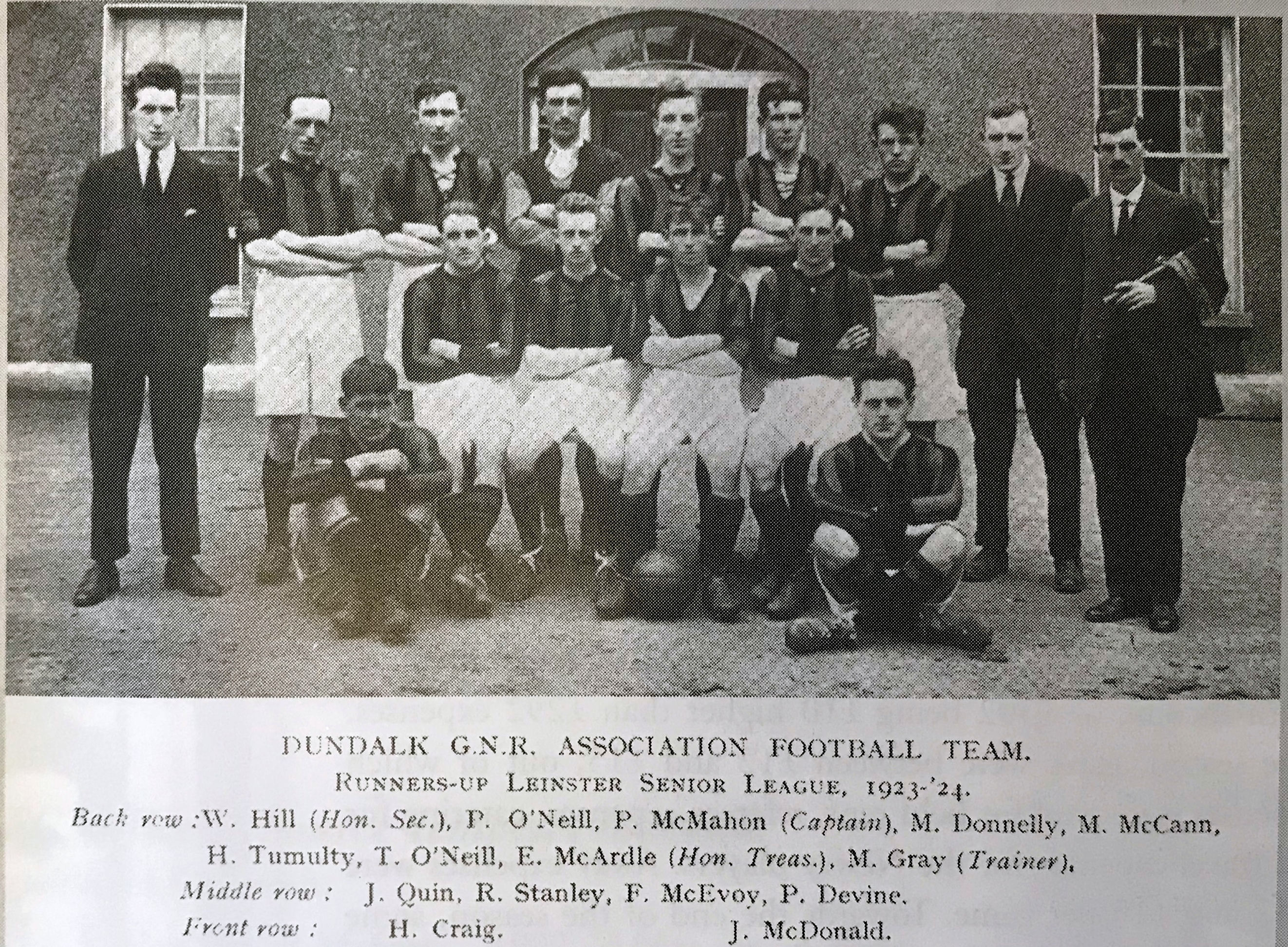
Dundalk G.N.R. in the Leinster Senior League, 1923–24

Dundalk Football Club is a professional association football club in Dundalk, Ireland. They compete in the League of Ireland and are the second most successful club in the League's history (with 14 league titles and 12 FAI Cups) as of the end of the 2026 season.

The table details the team's achievements in senior first-team competitions. As of the end of the 2026 season, the team has spent 104 seasons in senior football – four seasons in the Leinster Senior League, 90 seasons in the League of Ireland/Premier Division, and 10 seasons in the League of Ireland First Division (the second tier).

== League seasons ==
Season	League										FAI Cup	League Cup / Shield	Europe		Other^{a}
Season	Division	Pld	W	D	L	GF	GA	GD	Pts	Pos	FAI Cup	League Cup / Shield	Europe		Other^{a}
2026	Prem	36	11	12	13	55	59	-4	45	6th	QF	N/A	DNQ	N/A	
2025	First	36	23	10	3	74	31	+43	79	1st	R2	N/A	DNQ	N/A	Leinster Senior Cup W
2024	Prem	36	5	11	20	23	50	-27	26	10th	R1	N/A	DNQ	N/A	
2023	Prem	36	17	7	12	59	44	+15	58	5th	QF	N/A	2023–24 Europa Conference League	2Q	
2022	Prem	36	18	12	6	53	30	+23	66	3rd	QF	N/A	DNQ	N/A	
2021	Prem	36	13	9	14	44	46	-2	48	6th	SF	N/A	2021–22 Europa Conference League	3Q	President's Cup W
2020	Prem	18	7	5	6	25	23	+2	26	3rd	W	N/A (Note: No competition due to COVID-19 pandemic)	2020–21 Champions League 2020–21 Europa League (Note: Teams knocked out in Champions Path 1Q of the Champions League automatically entered Champions Path 2Q of that season's Europa League.)	1Q Grp	
2019	Prem	36	27	5	4	73	18	+55	86	1st	R/U	W	2019–20 Champions League 2019–20 Europa League (Note: Teams knocked out in Champions Path 2Q of the Champions League automatically entered Champions Path 3Q of that season's Europa League.)	2Q 3Q	President's Cup W Champions Cup W
2018	Prem	36	27	6	3	85	20	+65	87	1st	W	SF	2018–19 Europa League	2Q	President's Cup R/U
2017	Prem	33	22	3	8	72	24	+48	69	2nd	R/U	W	2017–18 Champions League	2Q	President's Cup R/U; Leinster Senior Cup R/U
2016	Prem	33	25	2	6	73	28	+45	77	1st	R/U	R2	2016–17 Champions League 2016–17 Europa League (Note: Teams knocked out in the play-off round of the Champions League automatically entered the group stage of that season's Europa League.)	PO Grp	President's Cup R/U
2015	Prem	33	23	9	1	78	23	+55	78	1st	W	SF	2015–16 Champions League	2Q	President's Cup W Leinster Senior Cup W
2014	Prem	33	22	8	3	73	24	+49	74	1st	QF	W	2014–15 Europa League	2Q	Setanta Cup R/U
2013	Prem	33	21	5	7	55	30	+25	68	2nd	SF	R2	DNQ	N/A	
2012	Prem	30	4	8	18	23	63	−40	20	11th	SF	QF	DNQ	N/A	
2011	Prem	36	11	11	14	50	53	−3	44	7th	QF	R2	DNQ	N/A	Setanta Cup R/U
2010	Prem	36	14	6	16	46	50	−4	48	6th	R3	SF	2010–11 Europa League	2Q	
2009	Prem	36	12	8	16	46	51	−5	44	5th	L16	R1	DNQ	N/A	
2008	First	36	21	8	7	69	30	+39	71	1st	L16	R2	DNQ	N/A	
2007	First	36	19	9	8	56	30	+26	66	3rd	R3	R1	DNQ	N/A	
2006	First	36	22	5	9	57	33	+24	71	2nd (Note: Galway United promoted to the Premier Division instead of Dundalk as a result of the implementation of the 2006 IAG Report.)	R3	R2	DNQ	N/A	
2005	First	36	12	13	11	44	40	+4	49	6th	R3	R1	DNQ	N/A	
2004	First	33	14	4	15	46	57	−11	46	6th	R2	Grp (Note: 2004 League Cup was the last time that group stages were used to decide who entered the knock out stages.)	DNQ	N/A	
2003	First	33	6	14	13	36	40	−4	32	10th	L16	Grp	DNQ	N/A	
2002–03	First	22	5	8	9	28	36	−8	23	9th	L16	N/A (Note: No competition due to shortened season.)	2002–03 UEFA Cup	PR	LFA President's Cup R/U
2001–02	Prem	33	9	12	12	37	46	−9	39	10th	W	R1	DNQ	N/A	
2000–01	First	36	20	9	7	65	38	+27	69	1st	L16	R1	DNQ	N/A	
1999–2000	First	36	20	6	10	50	31	+19	66	4th	R1	R1	DNQ	N/A	
1998–99	Prem	33	6	9	18	23	40	−17	27	12th	R2	Grp	DNQ	N/A	
1997–98	Prem	33	12	9	12	41	43	−2	45	6th	R2	SF	DNQ	N/A	
1996–97	Prem	33	9	9	15	32	50	−18	36	10th	R2	QF	DNQ	N/A	
1995–96	Prem	33	11	9	13	38	39	−1	42	7th	R1	QF	1995–96 UEFA Cup	PR	LFA President's Cup R/U
1994–95	Prem	33	17	8	8	41	25	+16	59	1st	QF	R/U	DNQ	N/A	Leinster Senior Cup R/U
1993–94	Prem	32	10	13	9	37	27	+10	43	8th	R2	R1	DNQ	N/A	Leinster Senior Cup R/U
1992–93	Prem	32	13	13	6	35	28	+7	39	4th	R/U	Grp	DNQ	N/A	
1991–92	Prem	33	14	12	7	44	31	+13	40	4th	R2	SF	1991–92 European Cup	R1	
1990–91	Prem	33	22	8	3	52	17	+35	52	1st	R1	Grp	DNQ	N/A	
1989–90	Prem	33	17	8	8	50	26	+24	42	3rd	R1	W	1989–90 UEFA Cup	R1	LFA President's Cup W
1988–89	Prem	33	20	11	2	55	27	+28	51	2nd	QF	2nd	1988–89 European Cup	R1	LFA President's Cup W
1987–88	Prem	33	19	8	6	54	32	+22	46	1st	W	QF	1987–88 European Cup Winners' Cup	R1	LFA President's Cup R/U
1986–87	Prem	22	12	6	4	40	21	+19	30	2nd	R/U	W	DNQ	N/A	LFA President's Cup R/U
1985–86	Prem	22	12	6	4	35	16	+19	30	3rd	QF	R/U	DNQ	N/A	
1984–85	LOI	30	9	10	11	34	39	−5	28	8th	R2	SF	DNQ	N/A	
1983–84	LOI	26	9	9	8	38	31	+7	27	7th	R1	Grp	DNQ	N/A	Dublin City Cup R/U
1982–83	LOI	26	14	6	6	32	17	+15	48	3rd	R1	R/U	1982–83 European Cup	R1	LFA President's Cup R/U
1981–82	LOI	30	20	6	4	61	24	+37	80	1st	SF	R1	1981–82 European Cup Winners' Cup	R1	Leinster Senior Cup R/U; LFA President's Cup W
1980–81	LOI	30	20	5	5	63	28	+35	45	2nd	W	W	1980–81 UEFA Cup	R1	LFA President's Cup W
1979–80	LOI	30	20	6	4	59	13	+46	46	2nd	R2	R2	1979–80 European Cup	L16	LFA President's Cup W
1978–79	LOI	30	19	7	4	57	25	+32	45	1st	W	R1	DNQ	N/A	
1977–78	LOI	30	9	9	12	43	46	−3	27	11th	R2	W	1977–78 European Cup Winners' Cup	R1	Leinster Senior Cup W LFA President's Cup R/U
1976–77	LOI	26	12	5	9	51	42	+9	29	5th	W	Grp	1976–77 European Cup	R1	Leinster Senior Cup W LFA President's Cup R/U
1975–76	LOI	26	15	10	1	54	26	+28	40	1st	R1	R2	DNQ	N/A	
1974–75	LOI	26	10	8	8	37	36	+1	28	5th	R1	Grp	DNQ	N/A	
1973–74	LOI	26	12	4	10	41	36	+5	28	6th	R2	SF (Note: First season of League of Ireland Cup.)	DNQ	N/A	Leinster Senior Cup W
1972–73	LOI	26	4	6	16	19	48	−29	14	13th	R1	SF (Note: Final season of League of Ireland Shield.)	DNQ	N/A	LFA President's Cup R/U
1971–72	LOI	26	11	3	12	39	46	−7	25	7th	SF	W	DNQ	N/A	
1970–71	LOI	26	7	11	8	37	33	−4	25	9th	R1	Grp	DNQ	N/A	Dublin City Cup R/U; Leinster Senior Cup W
1969–70	LOI	26	12	6	8	42	37	−5	30	5th	SF	SF	1969–70 Inter-Cities Fairs Cup	R1	
1968–69	LOI	22	13	3	6	54	29	+25	29	4th	R1	2nd	1968–69 Inter-Cities Fairs Cup	R2	Dublin City Cup W LFA President's Cup R/U
1967–68	LOI	22	14	2	6	44	24	+20	30	2nd	SF	2nd	1967–68 European Cup	R1	Dublin City Cup W
1966–67	LOI	22	15	4	3	54	19	+35	34	1st	SF	1st	DNQ	N/A	Top Four Cup W Dublin City Cup R/U; Leinster Senior Cup R/U
1965–66	LOI	22	9	3	10	32	35	−3	21	8th	R2	6th	DNQ	N/A	Dublin City Cup R/U
1964–65	LOI	22	7	5	10	31	37	−6	19	9th	R2	PO	DNQ	N/A	LFA President's Cup W Leinster Senior Cup R/U
1963–64	LOI	22	12	6	4	49	27	+22	30	2nd	R1	2nd	1963–64 European Cup	R1	Top Four Cup W LFA President's Cup W
1962–63	LOI	18	9	6	3	39	23	+16	24	1st	R2	3rd	DNQ	N/A	P.J. Casey Cup R/U
1961–62	LOI	22	8	5	9	42	36	+6	21	8th	R1	5th	DNQ	N/A	Leinster Senior Cup R/U
1960–61	LOI	22	12	2	8	43	37	+6	26	5th	R1	6th	DNQ	N/A	Leinster Senior Cup W
1959–60	LOI	22	12	3	7	50	32	+18	27	5th	SF	11th	DNQ	N/A	
1958–59	LOI	22	6	3	13	34	53	−19	15	11th	R2	8th	DNQ	N/A	Leinster Senior Cup R/U; LFA President's Cup R/U
1957–58	LOI	22	7	3	12	38	46	−8	17	8th	W	7th	DNQ (Note: First season of Irish entry to European Competition.)	N/A	
1956–57	LOI	22	4	8	10	33	40	−7	16	10th	R1	8th			
1955–56	LOI	22	6	5	11	37	54	−17	17	10th	R1	5th			
1954–55	LOI	22	5	3	14	39	66	−27	13	12th	R1	12th			
1953–54	LOI	22	4	4	14	32	54	−22	12	12th	R1	8th			
1952–53	LOI	22	8	6	8	45	45	0	22	6th	R1	5th			LFA President's Cup R/U
1951–52	LOI	22	4	7	11	37	50	−13	15	11th	W	4th			LFA President's Cup W
1950–51	LOI	18	4	4	10	35	44	−9	12	8th	R2	5th			Leinster Senior Cup W
1949–50	LOI	18	7	5	6	35	31	+4	19	5th	R1	4th			LFA President's Cup R/U
1948–49	LOI	18	9	5	4	33	24	+9	23	3rd	W	4th			Dublin City Cup W Dublin and Belfast Inter-City Cup R/U
1947–48	LOI	14	6	5	3	21	14	+7	17	2nd	R1	5th			Dublin City Cup R/U
1946–47	LOI	14	4	3	7	25	37	−12	11	6th	R1	2nd			
1945–46	LOI	14	4	5	5	36	37	−1	13	5th	R1	6th			
1944–45	LOI	14	4	3	7	22	33	−11	11	6th	SF	6th			
1943–44	LOI	14	6	3	5	21	19	+12	15	4th	SF	7th			LFA President's Cup R/U
1942–43	LOI	18	11	4	3	40	22	+18	26	2nd	R2	4th			Dublin City Cup W
1941–42	LOI	18	8	3	7	45	36	+9	19	4th	W	2nd			Dublin and Belfast Inter-City Cup W
1940–41	LOI	20	9	1	10	43	42	+1	19	7th	SF	5th			Dublin City Cup R/U
1939–40	LOI	22	11	3	8	45	36	−9	25	4th	R1	4th			
1938–39	LOI	22	10	7	5	48	31	+17	27	3rd	SF	7th			Leinster Senior Cup R/U
1937–38	LOI	22	13	4	5	53	29	+24	30	3rd	R/U	4th			Dublin City Cup W
1936–37	LOI	22	10	4	8	41	34	+7	24	2nd	R1	7th			Dublin City Cup R/U; Leinster Senior Cup R/U
1935–36	LOI	22	9	3	10	43	39	+4	21	7th	SF	4th			Dublin City Cup R/U; Leinster Senior Cup R/U
1934–35	LOI	18	8	4	6	37	32	+5	20	5th	R/U	7th			Leinster Senior Cup R/U
1933–34	LOI	18	9	3	6	33	25	+8	21	4th	SF	4th			
1932–33	LOI	18	13	3	2	44	21	+23	29	1st	R1	2nd			LFA President's Cup R/U
1931–32	LOI	22	11	5	6	56	31	+25	27	4th	R1	5th			
1930–31	LOI	22	11	6	5	64	43	+21	28	2nd	R/U	9th			LFA President's Cup W
1929–30	LOI	18	6	3	9	38	36	+2	15	6th	SF	5th			
1928–29	LOI	18	7	3	8	43	44	+1	17	5th	SF	4th			Leinster Senior Cup R/U
1927–28	LOI	18	9	3	6	44	36	+8	21	5th	R2	3rd			
1926–27	LOI	18	3	6	9	30	40	−10	12	8th	R1	7th			
1925–26	LSL	30	22	1	7	88	50	+38	45	3rd	PR	N/A			
1924–25	LSL	26 (Note: League program completed with Dundalk G.N.R. having two games left to play.)	17	4	5	62	34	+28	38	3rd	PR	N/A			
1923–24	LSL	26	13	9	4	57	29	+28	35	3rd	PR	N/A			
1922–23	LSL	19 (Note: League program completed with Dundalk G.N.R. having three games left to play.)	13	1	5	41	29	+12	27	4th	PR	N/A			
Season	Division	P	W	D	L	GF	GA	GD	Pts	Pos	FAI Cup	League Cup / Shield	Europe		Other^{a}

a. Includes the Dublin City Cup, Top Four Cup, Leinster Senior Cup, Dublin and Belfast Intercity Cup, Setanta Sports Cup, Champions Cup (All-Ireland), President of Ireland's Cup, and LFA President's Cup.

== Key ==
Winners	Runners-up	Play-offs	Promoted	Relegated

- P = Played
- W = Games won
- D = Games drawn
- L = Games lost
- F = Goals for
- A = Goals against
- Pts = Points
- Pos = Final position
- Prem = League of Ireland Premier Division
- First = League of Ireland First Division
- LOI = League of Ireland pre 1985–86 (Note: League of Ireland split into two divisions for the 1985–86 season.)
- LSL = Leinster Senior League
- DNQ = Did not qualify
- PR = Preliminary Round
- 1Q = 1st Qualifying Round
- 2Q = 2nd Qualifying Round
- 3Q = 3rd Qualifying Round
- PO = Play-off Round
- Grp = Group Stage
- R1 = Round 1
- R2 = Round 2
- R3 = Round 3
- R4 = Round 4
- R5 = Round 5
- L16 = Round of 16
- QF = Quarter-finals
- SF = Semi-finals
- R/U = Runners Up
- W = Winners
