= 1988 FAI Cup final =

- Event: 1987–88 FAI Cup
Dundalk	Derry City
1	0
- Date: 1 May 1988
- Venue: Dalymount Park, Dublin
- Referee: John Spillane
- Attendance: 21,000

The 1988 FAI Cup final was the final match of the 1987–88 FAI Cup, a knock-out association football competition contested annually by clubs affiliated with the Football Association of Ireland. It took place on Sunday 1 May 1988 at Dalymount Park in Dublin, and was contested by Dundalk and Derry City. Dundalk won the match 1–0 to win the cup for the eighth time, and, in so doing, won their second League and Cup Double.

== Background ==
The two sides' three previous meetings that season had been in the League, with Dundalk winning both matches in Oriel Park and Derry winning the match in the Brandywell. Dundalk had already been confirmed League of Ireland Champions for 1987–88, and they were chasing their second League and Cup Double. They had lost the previous season's final and hadn't won the Cup since 1981. To reach the final they had defeated Sligo Rovers (3–2 in a replay after a 1–1 draw), Bray Wanderers (2–0), Cork City (1–0 in a replay after a 0–0 draw), and St Patrick's Athletic (4–0 on aggregate in a two-leg semi-final).

Derry City had joined the League in 1985–86, and been promoted in 1986–87. They finished eighth in the Premier Division in their first season, and were playing in their first FAI Cup final, but had already qualified for the 1988–89 European Cup Winners' Cup due to Dundalk qualifying for the 1988–89 European Cup. They had overcome non-league St Joseph's Boys (6–0), Bohemians (4–1 in a replay after a 0–0 draw), Home Farm (3–0), and Longford Town (6–2 on aggregate in a two-leg semi-final) to reach the final.

The match was broadcast live on RTÉ Two in Ireland with commentary from George Hamilton.

== Match ==
=== Summary ===
The match, spoiled somewhat by a strong blustery wind and a cut-up pitch, was settled by a controversial 20th-minute penalty, scored by John Cleary. Derry's Martin Bayly had been harshly adjudged to have fouled Dundalk's Larry Wyse by referee Spillane, when Bayly pushed Wyse on the right-hand side of the penalty area but not with enough force to knock him over. Derry City had two claims for penalties of their own waved away in the second half, but on the balance of play Dundalk were considered to have been the better team, generally snuffing out Derry City's attacking play and creating a number of good chances of their own. Dundalk's victory meant that they had secured their second League and Cup Double, the first having been won in 1978–79.

=== Details ===
1 May 1988
15:30

Dundalk	1–0	Derry City
John Cleary 20' (pen.)	Report

Dalymount Park, Dublin
Attendance: 21,000
Referee: John Spillane

Dundalk	Derry City

GK	(Republic of Ireland) Alan O'Neill
CB	(Republic of Ireland) Harry McCue
CB	(Republic of Ireland) John Cleary
CB	(Republic of Ireland) Joey Malone (c)
RWB	(Republic of Ireland) Gino Lawless
LWB	(Republic of Ireland) Martin Lawlor
CM	(Republic of Ireland) Martin Murray
CM	(Republic of Ireland) Larry Wyse	(substituted off) 70'
CM	(Republic of Ireland) Barry Kehoe
CF	(Republic of Ireland) Terry Eviston
CF	(Republic of Ireland) Dessie Gorman
Substitutes:
MF	(Republic of Ireland) Michael O'Connor	(substituted in) 70'
Manager:
(Republic of Ireland) Turlough O'Connor

GK	(Wales) Stuart Roberts
RB	(France) Pascal Vaudequin
CB	(Northern Ireland) Paul Curran
CB	(Scotland) Stuart Gauld (c)
LB	(Northern Ireland) Ray McGuinness
RM	(Northern Ireland) Paul Carlyle
CM	(Northern Ireland) Felix Healy	(substituted off) 63'
CM	(England) Calvin Plummer
LM	(Republic of Ireland) Martin Bayly
CF	(South Africa) Owen Da Gama
CF	(Northern Ireland) Jonathan Speak
Substitutes:
MF	(Northern Ireland) John Cunningham	(substituted in) 63'
Manager:
(Northern Ireland) Jim McLaughlin

== See also ==
- Derry City F.C.
- List of Derry City F.C. seasons
- Dundalk F.C.
- History of Dundalk F.C.
- List of Dundalk F.C. seasons
- List of Dundalk F.C. records and statistics
