= 1987–88 Dundalk F.C. season =

Dundalk
1987–88 season
- Manager: Turlough O'Connor
- Premier Division: 1st (champions)
- FAI Cup: Winners
- League Cup: Quarter-final
- President's Cup: Runners-up
- Leinster Senior Cup: 2nd Round
- European Cup Winners' Cup: First round
- Top goalscorer: League: Dessie Gorman (14); All: Dessie Gorman (16)
Home colours

Dundalk entered the 1987–88 season as the League Cup holders from 1986–87, having won that competition and finished as runners-up in both league and FAI Cup. 1987–88 was Turlough O'Connor's third season as manager, and was Dundalk's 62nd consecutive season in the top tier of Irish football.

== Season summary ==
The new season opened with the Leinster Senior Cup, with Dundalk exiting in the second round. The League Cup followed and, after qualifying from a four team mini-group to reach the quarter-finals, they were knocked out by St Patrick's Athletic. The 33-round League programme commenced on 13 September 1987, and was completed on 21 April 1988. Shamrock Rovers had won the title for the previous four seasons and were expected to challenge again, while St Patrick's Athletic, Bohemians and Cork City were all strongly tipped. Dundalk went top of the table early, but slumped to fourth after back-to-back defeats in October. They then put together a seven match winning streak, to lead by three points in the run up to Christmas. They continued to lead into March, until a five match winless streak saw them slip to third.

With three games remaining, the season appeared to swing back in Dundalk's favour when, after going two goals down to Derry City in Oriel Park, they scored three times in the final 13 minutes to win the match. A big win the following week over Bray Wanderers meant that, going into the final match of the season, they only needed a draw against St Patrick's Athletic – their closest challengers – to become Champions. Pats themselves required a win to pip Dundalk to the title. The televised finale, described as being played out in the "emotion charged atmosphere of Oriel Park", ended 1–1. Dundalk had won the League for the first time since 1981–82, and their first title in the Premier Division era. They went on to win the 1988 FAI Cup final, with a 1–0 victory over Derry City on 1 May 1988 – the club's second League and Cup Double – to cap a season that had seen them play 50 matches.

As FAI Cup runners-up from the season before, they qualified for the 1987–88 European Cup Winners' Cup. In the first round they drew a glamour tie against the holders, Ajax Amsterdam (many of whose players would be in the Dutch squad that would win Euro '88). Despite "gallant" displays, Ajax ran out comfortable winners 6–0 on aggregate.

=== First-Team Squad (1987–88) ===
No.	Name	Years	League	FAI Cup	League Cup	Europe	Other^{a}	Total	Goals
1	(Republic of Ireland) Alan O'Neill	1985–1993	33	8	3	2	2	48	0
2	(Republic of Ireland) Martin Lawlor	1977–1995	28	6	3	0	2	39	1
3	(Republic of Ireland) Joey Malone	1985–1990	33	8	3	2	3	49	1
4	(Republic of Ireland) Harry McCue	1985–1988	7	5	4	2	1	19	0
5	(Republic of Ireland) Gino Lawless	1986–1994	33	8	3	2	1	47	2
6	(Republic of Ireland) Larry Wyse	1986–1989	32	7	2	2	1	44	6
7	(Republic of Ireland) Barry Kehoe	1980–1993	25	8	4	2	3	41	6
8	(Republic of Ireland) Martin Murray	1984–1990	31	8	3	2	3	47	7
9	(Republic of Ireland) Dessie Gorman	1985–1989	31	8	3	2	1	45	16
10	(Republic of Ireland) Terry Eviston	1986–1993	32	8	4	2	1	47	15
11	(Republic of Ireland) John Cleary	1984–1991	33	8	4	2	2	49	8
12	(Republic of Ireland) Paul Newe	1987–1990	18	5	4	2	3	32	4
13	(Republic of Ireland) Michael O'Connor	1987–1988	25	6	0	0	1	32	6
14	(Republic of Ireland) Mick Shelley	1985–1993	18	3	4	2	2	29	1
15	(Republic of Ireland) Dave Connell	1985–1988	4	0	2	0	2	8	0

a. Includes the Leinster Senior Cup and LFA President's Cup.

== Competitions ==
=== Leinster Senior Cup ===
First round

6 August 1987	Dundalk	1–0	Drogheda United	Dundalk
				Stadium: Oriel Park

Second round

20 August 1987	Dundalk	1–2	Athlone Town	Dundalk
				Stadium: Oriel Park

=== League Cup ===
Group

23 August 1987	Bohemians	1–0	Dundalk	Dublin
				Stadium: Dalymount Park

30 August 1987	Monaghan United	1–3	Dundalk	Monaghan
				Stadium: Gortakeegan

3 September 1987	Dundalk	2–0	Drogheda United	Dundalk
				Stadium: Oriel Park

Quarter Final

6 September 1987	Dundalk	1–2	St Patrick's Athletic	Dundalk
				Stadium: Oriel Park

=== LFA President's Cup ===
12 November 1987	Dundalk	0–0 (a.e.t.) (1–3 p)	Shamrock Rovers	Dundalk
				Stadium: Oriel Park

=== Premier Division ===
13 September 1987 Round 1	Cork City	0–2	Dundalk

20 September 1987 Round 2	Dundalk	2–1	Limerick

27 September 1987 Round 3	Shelbourne	0–2	Dundalk

4 October 1987 Round 4	Dundalk	0–0	Bohemians

11 October 1987 Round 5	Sligo Rovers	2–2	Dundalk

18 October 1987 Round 6	Dundalk	1–0	Waterford

25 October 1987 Round 7	Galway United	1–0	Dundalk

26 October 1987 Round 8	Dundalk	0–2	St Patrick's Athletic

30 October 1987 Round 9	Shamrock Rovers	0–1	Dundalk

8 November 1987 Round 10	Dundalk	2–0	Derry City

15 November 1987 Round 11	Dundalk	2–0	Bray Wanderers

22 November 1987 Round 12	Bray Wanderers	2–3	Dundalk

29 November 1987 Round 13	Dundalk	3–1	Cork City

6 December 1987 Round 14	Limerick	0–3	Dundalk

13 December 1987 Round 15	Dundalk	3–1	Shelbourne

20 December 1987 Round 16	Bohemians	2–3	Dundalk

27 December 1987 Round 17	Dundalk	1–0	Sligo Rovers

28 December 1987 Round 18	Waterford	2–3	Dundalk

3 January 1988 Round 19	Dundalk	1–1	Shamrock Rovers

10 January 1988 Round 20	Derry City	3–0	Dundalk

17 January 1988 Round 21	Dundalk	2–1	Galway United

24 January 1988 Round 22	St Patrick's Athletic	2–2	Dundalk

7 February 1988 Round 23	Dundalk	4–0	Limerick

21 February 1988 Round 24	Shelbourne	0–1	Dundalk

28 February 1988 Round 25	Dundalk	0–2	Bohemians

9 March 1988 Round 26	Cork City	1–1	Dundalk

13 March 1988 Round 27	Sligo Rovers	0–0	Dundalk

17 March 1988 Round 28	Dundalk	1–1	Waterford

20 March 1988 Round 29	Galway United	2–0	Dundalk

2 April 1988 Round 30	Shamrock Rovers	0–1	Dundalk

4 April 1988 Round 31	Dundalk	3–2	Derry City

13 April 1988 Round 32	Dundalk	5–1	Bray Wanderers

21 April 1988 Round 33	Dundalk	1–1	St Patrick's Athletic

==== League table ====
Pos	Team	Pld	W	D	L	GF	GA	GD	Pts	Qualification or relegation
1	Dundalk (C)	33	19	8	6	54	32	+22	46	Qualification to 1988–89 European Cup
2	St Patrick's Athletic	33	18	9	6	52	25	+27	45	Qualification to 1988–89 UEFA Cup
3	Bohemians	33	17	11	5	57	32	+25	45	
4	Shamrock Rovers	33	16	9	8	53	30	+23	41	
5	Galway United	33	15	10	8	48	34	+14	40	
6	Waterford United	33	10	14	9	40	31	+9	34	
7	Cork City	33	12	10	11	41	47	−6	34	
8	Derry City	33	13	5	15	59	44	+15	31	Qualification to 1988–89 European Cup Winners' Cup
9	Limerick City	33	9	7	17	33	60	−27	25	
10	Shelbourne	33	8	8	17	27	65	−38	24	
11	Bray Wanderers (R)	33	4	10	19	27	65	−38	18	Relegation to League of Ireland First Division
12	Sligo Rovers (R)	33	4	5	24	30	81	−51	13	Relegation to League of Ireland First Division

Source: www.rsssf.com
(C) Champions; (R) Relegated

=== FAI Cup ===
First round

14 February 1988	Sligo Rovers	1–1	Dundalk	Sligo, County Sligo
			Michael O'Connor	Stadium: The Showgrounds

First round replay

18 February 1988	Dundalk	3–2	Sligo Rovers	Dundalk
	Terry Eviston (2); Paul Newe			Stadium: Oriel Park

Second round

6 March 1988	Dundalk	2–0	Bray Wanderers	Dundalk
	John Cleary; Paul Newe			Stadium: Oriel Park

Quarter Final

27 March 1988	Dundalk	0–0	Cork City	Dundalk
				Stadium: Oriel Park

Quarter Final Replay

27 March 1988	Cork City	0–1	Dundalk	Cork
			Martin Murray	Stadium: Turners Cross

Semi-final

10 April 1988	Dundalk	1–0	St Patrick's Athletic	Dundalk
			Dessie Gorman	Stadium: Oriel Park

17 April 1988	St Patrick's Athletic	0–3	Dundalk	Dublin
			Barry Kehoe; Dessie Gorman; Martin Murray	Stadium: Richmond Park

Dundalk won 4–0 on aggregate.

Final

1 May 1988	Dundalk	1–0	Derry City	Dublin
15:30	John Cleary 20' (pen.)	Report		Stadium: Dalymount Park; Attendance: 21,000; Referee: John Spillane

=== Europe ===
==== Cup Winners' Cup ====
First round

16 September 1987

Ajax (Netherlands)	4–0	(Republic of Ireland) Dundalk
Rijkaard 65'; Blind 73'; Winter 81'; Stapleton 85'

Olympisch Stadion, Amsterdam
Attendance: 15,712
Referee: José María Enríquez Negreira (Spain)
30 September 1987

Dundalk (Republic of Ireland)	0–2	(Netherlands) Ajax
		Newe 71' (o.g.); Meijer 87'

Oriel Park, Dundalk
Attendance: 5,000
Referee: Rune Larsson (Sweden)

Ajax won 6–0 on aggregate.

== Awards ==
=== Player of the Month ===
Month	Player	References
March	(Republic of Ireland) Terry Eviston	
April	(Republic of Ireland) Dessie Gorman	

=== SWAI Personality of the Year ===
Person	Reference
(Republic of Ireland) Terry Eviston	
