= 1990–91 Dundalk F.C. season =

Dundalk
1990–91 season
- Manager: Turlough O'Connor
- Premier Division: 1st (champions)
- FAI Cup: 1st Round
- League Cup: Group
- Leinster Senior Cup: 2nd Round
- Top goalscorer: League: Peter Hanrahan (18); All: Peter Hanrahan (20)
Home colours	Away colours

Dundalk entered the 1990–91 season having ended the previous season trophy-less for the first time since Turlough O'Connor's debut season as manager in 1985–86. They also had no European football, having not qualified for any of the competitions the season before. It was Dundalk's 65th consecutive season in the top tier of Irish football.

== Season summary ==
A number of key players from the Double-winning 1987–88 season had moved on at the end of 1989–90, and they were joined early on by Tony Cousins, who signed for Liverpool in September. A new look side opened the season with a 7–0 hammering of Longford Town in the Leinster Senior Cup, but some poor results saw early exits in both the Leinster Cup and the League of Ireland Cup. The 33-round League programme commenced on 2 September 1990, and in the opening match Dundalk were well beaten by Shelbourne, 5–1. That defeat, after a poor sequence, sparked a recovery and, with the exception of two defeats to newly promoted Sligo Rovers, they went the rest of the season unbeaten. Midway through the season, however, they suffered a shock 1–0 defeat in the FAI Cup to non-League Ashtown Villa. The league schedule was completed on 21 April 1991 and, in an end of season, winner takes all match in Turner's Cross against Cork City, Dundalk won the title for the eighth time, with the winning goal being scored by cult hero, Tom McNulty.

=== First-Team Squad (1990–91) ===
No.	Name	Years	League	FAI Cup	League Cup	Leinster Cup	Total	Goals
1	(Republic of Ireland) Alan O'Neill	1985–1993	33	1	3	2	39	0
2	(Republic of Ireland) Martin Lawlor	1977–1995	29	1	3	1	34	0
3	(Scotland) James Coll	1989–1995	31	1	2	0	34	3
4	(Republic of Ireland) Ronnie Murphy	1990–1993	32	1	1	1	35	1
5	(Republic of Ireland) Gino Lawless	1986–1994	28	1	3	1	33	2
6	(Republic of Ireland) Dave Mackey	1988–1993	28	1	3	1	33	3
7	(Republic of Ireland) Michael Kavanagh	1990–1994	29	1	3	2	35	1
8	(Scotland) Tom McNulty	1984–2000	32	1	3	1	37	10
9	(Republic of Ireland) Peter Hanrahan	1990–1994	32	1	2	1	36	20
10	(Republic of Ireland) Terry Eviston	1986–1993	33	1	3	0	37	10
11	(Republic of Ireland) Mick Shelley	1985–1993	33	1	3	1	38	1
12	(Republic of Ireland) Paul Brady	1990–1993	17	0	3	1	21	1
13	(Republic of Ireland) Tony Cousins	1988–1990 (Note: Player transferred to Liverpool in September)	4	0	2	1	7	7
14	(Republic of Ireland) Roddy Collins	1989–1991	7	1	0	1	9	1
15	(Republic of Ireland) Eamon Synnott	1990–1992	15	0	0	2	17	1

== Competitions ==
=== Leinster Senior Cup ===
First round

16 August 1990	Dundalk	7–0	Longford Town	Dundalk
				Stadium: Oriel Park

Second round

23 August 1990	Dundalk	0–1	Athlone Town	Athlone
				Stadium: St Mel's Park

=== League Cup ===
Group

19 August 1990	Dundalk	2–1	Monaghan United	Dundalk
				Stadium: Oriel Park

26 August 1990	Drogheda United	0–0	Dundalk	Drogheda
				Stadium: United Park

30 August 1990	Dundalk	1–1	Athlone Town	Dundalk
				Stadium: Oriel Park

Did not qualify for Quarter-final

=== Premier Division ===
2 September 1990 Round 1	Dundalk	1–5	Shelbourne

9 September 1990 Round 2	Athlone Town	0–1	Dundalk

13 September 1990 Round 3	Dundalk	4–1	Bohemians

23 September 1990 Round 4	Limerick	0–4	Dundalk

30 September 1990 Round 5	Dundalk	0–0	Waterford United

7 October 1990 Round 6	Sligo Rovers	0–2	Dundalk

14 October 1990 Round 7	Dundalk	3–0	St Patrick's Athletic

21 October 1990 Round 8	Derry City	0–1	Dundalk

24 October 1990 Round 9	Dundalk	2–0	Galway United

4 November 1990 Round 10	Shamrock Rovers	0–0	Dundalk

11 November 1990 Round 11	Dundalk	0–0	Cork City

18 November 1990 Round 12	Cork City	1–1	Dundalk

23 November 1990 Round 13	Shelbourne	1–2	Dundalk

29 November 1990 Round 14	Dundalk	3–0	Athlone Town

9 December 1990 Round 15	Bohemians	0–2	Dundalk

23 December 1990 Round 16	Waterford	1–3	Dundalk

30 December 1990 Round 17	Dundalk	0–2	Sligo Rovers

13 January 1991 Round 18	Dundalk	1–0	Derry City

20 January 1991 Round 19	Galway United	2–3	Dundalk

27 January 1991 Round 20	Dundalk	0–0	Shamrock Rovers

31 January 1991 Round 21	Dundalk	2–0	Shelbourne

10 February 1991 Round 22	Athlone Town	1–3	Dundalk

14 February 1991 Round 23	Dundalk	3–0	Bohemians

17 February 1991 Round 24	Dundalk	3–0	Limerick

19 February 1991 Round 25	St Patrick's Athletic	0–0	Dundalk

24 February 1991 Round 26	Limerick	0–3	Dundalk

3 March 1991 Round 27	Dundalk	1–0	Waterford United

17 March 1991 Round 28	Sligo Rovers	0–0	Dundalk

31 March 1991 Round 29	Dundalk	0–0	St Patrick's Athletic

1 April 1991 Round 30	Derry City	0–1	Dundalk

14 April 1991 Round 31	Shamrock Rovers	1–2	Dundalk

14 April 1991 Round 32	Dundalk	2–0	Galway United

21 April 1991 Round 33	Cork City	0–1	Dundalk

==== League table ====
Pos	Team	Pld	W	D	L	GF	GA	GD	Pts	Qualification or relegation
1	Dundalk (C)	33	22	8	3	52	17	+35	52	Qualification to 1991–92 European Cup
2	Cork City	33	19	12	2	45	18	+27	50	Qualification to 1991–92 UEFA Cup
3	St Patrick's Athletic	33	17	10	6	46	21	+25	44	
4	Shelbourne	33	18	6	9	59	30	+29	42	
5	Sligo Rovers	33	13	12	8	34	22	+12	38	
6	Shamrock Rovers	33	14	9	10	51	37	+14	37	
7	Derry City	33	13	9	11	51	28	+23	35	
8	Galway United	33	9	5	19	34	61	−27	23	Qualification to 1991–92 European Cup Winners' Cup
9	Bohemians	33	7	8	18	27	42	−15	22	
10	Athlone Town	33	6	7	20	22	53	−31	19	
11	Waterford United (R)	33	6	5	22	22	62	−40	17	Relegation to League of Ireland First Division
12	Limerick City (R)	33	6	5	22	21	73	−52	17	Relegation to League of Ireland First Division

Source: www.rsssf.com
(C) Champions; (R) Relegated

=== FAI Cup ===
First round

10 March 1991	Dundalk	0–1	Ashtown Villa	Dundalk
				Stadium: Oriel Park

== Awards ==
=== Player of the Month ===
Month	Player	References
October	(Republic of Ireland) Peter Hanrahan	
April	(Scotland) Tom McNulty	
