= SWAI Personality of the Year =

The Soccer Writers Association of Ireland Personality of the Year is an annual award for the person considered to have made the most positive impact on the domestic League of Ireland season.

Instigated in 1961 - when Drumcondra's Dan McCaffrey was the winner - it is one of the few awards that can be given to either a player or manager. In fact, the recipient in 1964 was FAI secretary Joe Wickham.

The award is organised by the Soccer Writers' Association of Ireland.

== Notable winners ==
Some of the notable winners of the award have included:

- Johnny Giles (1978) – Former Republic of Ireland international and manager.
- Jim McLaughlin (1979, 1984, 1989) – One of Ireland’s most successful club managers.
- Pat Fenlon (2004, 2006) – Multiple-time League of Ireland-winning manager.
- Damien Duff (2024) – Former Republic of Ireland international turned manager.

== Winners ==
| Year | Winner |
|---|---|
| 1961 | Dan McCaffrey (Drumcondra) |
| 1962 | Tommy Hamilton (Shamrock Rovers) |
| 1963 | Willie Browne (Bohemians) |
| 1964 | Joe Wickham (Secretary, FAI) |
| 1965 | Seán Thomas (Bohemians) |
| 1966 | Liam Tuohy (Shamrock Rovers) |
| 1967 | Al Finucane (Limerick) |
| 1968 | Johnny Fullam (Shamrock Rovers) |
| 1969 | Mick Leech (Shamrock Rovers) |
| 1970 | Peter Thomas (Waterford) |
| 1971 | Mick Meagan (Drogheda) |
| 1972 | Dave Bacuzzi (Cork Hibernians) |
| 1973 | Alfie Hale (Waterford) |
| 1974 | Paul O'Donovan (Cork Celtic) |
| 1975 | Johnny Fullam (Bohemians) |
| 1976 | Brendan Bradley (Finn Harps) |
| 1977 | Mick Smyth (Bohemians) |
| 1978 | Johnny Giles (Shamrock Rovers) |
| 1979 | Jim McLaughlin (Dundalk) |
| 1980 | Eoin Hand (Limerick United) |
| 1981 | Turlough O'Connor (Athlone Town) |
| 1982 | Tommy McConville (Dundalk) |
| 1983 | Noel Larkin (Athlone Town) |
| 1984 | Jim McLaughlin (Shamrock Rovers) |
| 1985 | Pat Byrne (Shamrock Rovers) |
| 1986 | Liam O'Brien (Shamrock Rovers) |
| 1987 | Mick Byrne (Shamrock Rovers) |
| 1988 | Terry Eviston (Dundalk) |
| 1989 | Jim McLaughlin (Derry City) |
| 1990 | Damien Byrne (St Patrick's Athletic) |
| 1991 | Peter Hanrahan (Dundalk) |
| 1992 | Pat Byrne (Shelbourne) |
| 1993 | Pat Morley (Cork City) |
| 1994 | Stephen Geoghegan (Shamrock Rovers) |
| 1995 | Liam Coyle (Derry City) |
| 1996 | Brian Kerr (St Patrick's Athletic) |
| 1997 | Peter Hutton (Derry City) |
| 1998 | Pat Dolan (St Patrick's Athletic) |
| 1999 | Paul Osam (St Patrick's Athletic) |
| 2000 | Dermot Keely (Shelbourne) |
| 2001 | Glen Crowe (Bohemians) |
| 2002 | Paul Doolin (UCD) |
| 2002-03 | Glen Crowe (Bohemians) |
| 2003 | Alan Mathews (Longford Town) |
| 2004 | Pat Fenlon (Shelbourne) |
| 2005 | Damien Richardson (Cork City) |
| 2006 | Pat Fenlon (Shelbourne) |
| 2007 | Paul Doolin (Drogheda United) |
| 2008 | Owen Heary (Bohemians) |
| 2009 | Liam Buckley (Sporting Fingal) |
| 2024 | Damien Duff (Shelbourne) |

== See also ==
- League of Ireland
- Football Association of Ireland
- PFAI Players' Player of the Year
