= 1978–79 Dundalk F.C. season =

Dundalk
1978–79 season
- Manager: Jim McLaughlin
- League of Ireland: 1st (champions)
- FAI Cup: Winners
- League Cup: First round
- Leinster Senior Cup: First round
- Top goalscorer: League: Hilary Carlyle (16); All: Hilary Carlyle (18)
Home colours

Dundalk entered the 1978–79 season, having won the previous season's League Cup and Leinster Senior Cup. But they had finished in a disappointing 11th place in the League, which meant there would be no European football in the new season. 1978–79 was Jim McLaughlin's fifth season as manager, and was Dundalk's 53rd consecutive season in the top tier of Irish football.

== Season summary ==
The previous season had been dogged by an early season row over player expenses, which had seen two players depart acrimoniously; while the death of club stalwart Brian McConville after returning home from a match in January 1978 had further affected the club. There were rumours that McLaughlin would be let go, despite retaining the Leinster Cup, and winning their first League Cup in a penalty shoot-out over Cork Alberts. Instead, the club supported the "reorganisation" he demanded, and used funds from the sale of three players (Synan Braddish, Derek Carroll and Brian Duff) to Liverpool, for a combined £55,000, to rebuild the squad and make ground improvements at Oriel.

The new season opened inauspiciously, with both the League Cup and the Leinster Cup being surrendered in their respective first rounds in early September. The League schedule commenced on 10 September 1978 and Dundalk continued their slow start, dropping points in eight of the first 15 matches to lie in fourth position. But, starting with a win over Shamrock Rovers on Christmas Eve, they only dropped three points from the next 14 matches to surge to the title with a game to spare. It was confirmed in slightly surreal fashion – with a win away to Cork Celtic (who were about to be expelled from the League) in front of 200 people; while the trophy was presented in Oriel Park 48 hours later after a final-day defeat to FAI Cup final opponents Waterford. Having made light work of reaching the 1979 FAI Cup final, they defeated Waterford 2–0, thereby completing the club's first League and Cup Double.

=== First-Team Squad (1978–79) ===
No.	Name	Years	League	FAI Cup	League Cup	Leinster Senior Cup	Total	Goals
1	(England) Richie Blackmore	1974–1985	27	4	0	0	31	0
2	(Republic of Ireland) Martin Lawlor	1977–1995	18	3	1	1	23	1
3	(Republic of Ireland) Paddy Dunning	1977–1983	29	4	0	0	33	4
4	(Republic of Ireland) Tommy McConville	1967–1986	30	4	1	1	36	1
5	(Republic of Ireland) Dermot Keely	1978–1981	28	3	0	1	32	0
6	(New Zealand) Sean Byrne	1977–1983	23	4	1	0	28	9
7	(England) Jimmy Dainty	1973–1980	29	3	1	1	34	7
8	(Republic of Ireland) Leo Flanagan	1978–1983	30	4	1	1	36	5
9	(Republic of Ireland) Cathal Muckian	1978–1980	27	4	1	1	33	13
10	(Republic of Ireland) Mick Lawlor	1976–1981	18	3	1	1	23	1
11	(Northern Ireland) Hilary Carlyle	1978–1984	26	4	0	0	30	18
12	(Republic of Ireland) Kevin Mahon	1978–1979	12	0	0	0	12	1
13	(Republic of Ireland) Willie Crawley	1977–1995	12	0	1	1	14	2
14	(Republic of Ireland) Vincent McKenna	1978–1981	12	3	0	0	15	1
15	(Republic of Ireland) Liam Devine	1978–1980	8	1	0	0	9	0
16	(Republic of Ireland) Frank O'Neill	1977–1980	5	1	1	0	7	1

== Competitions ==
=== League Cup ===
First round

3 September 1978	Dundalk	2–4	Home Farm	Dundalk
				Stadium: Oriel Park

=== Leinster Senior Cup ===
First round

14 September 1978	Dundalk	0–1	Aer Lingus	Dundalk
				Stadium: Oriel Park

=== FAI Cup ===
First round

11 February 1979	Dundalk	1–0	St Patrick's Athletic	Dundalk
				Stadium: Oriel Park

Quarter Final

11 March 1979	Dundalk	2–0	Finn Harps	Dundalk
				Stadium: Oriel Park

Semi-final

1 April 1979	Dundalk	2–1	Cork Alberts	Dublin
				Stadium: Dalymount Park

Final

22 April 1979	Dundalk	2–0	Waterford	Dublin
15:30	Sean Byrne 4'; Hilary Carlyle 90+1'	Report		Stadium: Dalymount Park; Attendance: 14,000; Referee: Paddy Daly

=== League ===
10 September 1978 Round 1	Shamrock Rovers	1–2	Dundalk

17 September 1978 Round 2	Dundalk	2–0	Limerick

24 September 1978 Round 3	Athlone Town	2–2	Dundalk

1 October 1978 Round 4	Dundalk	2–0	Home Farm

8 October 1978 Round 5	St Patrick's Athletic	2–2	Dundalk

15 October 1978 Round 6	Dundalk	1–1	Sligo Rovers

22 October 1978 Round 7	Cork Alberts	1–1	Dundalk

29 October 1978 Round 8	Dundalk	1–0	Drogheda United

5 November 1978 Round 9	Bohemians	0–0	Dundalk

12 November 1978 Round 10	Dundalk	4–1	Thurles Town

19 November 1978 Round 11	Dundalk	2–2	Galway Rovers

26 November 1978 Round 12	Dundalk	3–1	Shelbourne

3 December 1978 Round 13	Finn Harps	2–1	Dundalk

10 December 1978 Round 14	Dundalk	2–0	Cork Celtic

17 December 1978 Round 15	Waterford	1–0	Dundalk

24 December 1978 Round 16	Dundalk	3–2	Shamrock Rovers

27 December 1978 Round 17	Limerick	0–2	Dundalk

7 January 1979 Round 18	Home Farm	0–1	Dundalk

14 January 1979 Round 19	Dundalk	5–1	St Patrick's Athletic

21 January 1979 Round 20	Sligo Rovers	1–2	Dundalk

25 January 1979 Round 21	Dundalk	3–0	Athlone Town

28 January 1979 Round 22	Dundalk	3–0	Cork Alberts

4 February 1979 Round 23	Drogheda United	0–1	Dundalk

18 February 1979 Round 24	Dundalk	1–0	Bohemians

25 February 1979 Round 25	Thurles Town	1–3	Dundalk

4 March 1979 Round 26	Dundalk	2–1	Galway Rovers

18 March 1979 Round 27	Shelbourne	0–3	Dundalk

25 March 1979 Round 28	Dundalk	1–1	Finn Harps

7 April 1979 Round 29	Cork Celtic	0–3	Dundalk

10 April 1979 Round 30	Dundalk	0–3	Waterford

==== League table ====
Pos	Team	Pld	W	D	L	GF	GA	GD	Pts
1	Dundalk	30	19	7	4	57	25	+32	45
2	Bohemians	30	18	7	5	53	21	+32	43
3	Drogheda United	30	17	6	7	60	40	+20	42 (Note: After the matches Cork Celtic 0-0 Limerick, Drogheda United 0-1 Finn Harps and Thurles Town 0-1 Cork Celtic, the league awarded 1 point to Limerick from Cork Celtic, 2 points to Drogheda United from Finn Harps and 2 points to Thurles Town from Cork Celtic.)
4	Waterford	30	17	8	5	48	32	+16	42
5	Shamrock Rovers	30	17	3	10	45	25	+20	37
6	Limerick	30	13	9	8	39	25	+14	36
7	Athlone Town	30	14	7	9	56	41	+15	35
8	Finn Harps	30	15	6	9	56	41	+15	34
9	Home Farm	30	13	7	10	47	33	+14	33
10	Sligo Rovers	30	9	7	14	35	40	−5	25
11	Cork Alberts	30	7	9	14	35	49	−14	23
12	Thurles Town	30	8	5	17	35	62	−27	23
13	Shelbourne	30	6	9	15	41	58	−17	21
14	St Patrick's Athletic	30	7	6	17	36	62	−26	20
15	Galway Rovers	30	4	5	21	41	79	−38	13
16	Cork Celtic	30	3	5	22	16	67	−51	8

Source: www.rsssf.com

== Awards ==
=== Player of the Month ===
Month	Player	References
September	(Republic of Ireland) Dermot Keely	
March	(Republic of Ireland) Paddy Dunning	
April	(New Zealand) Sean Byrne	
