= 1981–82 Dundalk F.C. season =

Dundalk
1981–82 season
- Manager: Jim McLaughlin
- League of Ireland: 1st (champions)
- FAI Cup: Semi-final
- League Cup: First round
- President's Cup: Winners
- Leinster Senior Cup: Runners-up
- European Cup Winners' Cup: Second round
- Top goalscorer: League: Mick Fairclough (15); All: Mick Fairclough (20)
Home colours	Away colours

Dundalk entered the 1981–82 season, having finished as runners-up to Athlone Town the previous season. They were the holders of both the League Cup and the FAI Cup, having achieved their first domestic cup double. In the process, they had qualified for the Cup Winners' Cup. 1981–82 was Jim McLaughlin's eighth season as manager, and was Dundalk's 56th consecutive season in the top tier of Irish football.

== Season summary ==
The new season opened with the President's Cup, and Dundalk defeated Athlone 4–3 on aggregate to win it for the third season in a row. But the League Cup was surrendered in the first round, when County Louth neighbours Drogheda United defeated them on penalties. Later that season, they lost the Leinster Senior Cup final. The League schedule commenced on 10 September 1981, using a trial point system of 4 for an away win, 3 for a home win, 2 for an away draw, and 1 for a home draw. Dundalk started with five victories but, after they drew Tottenham Hotspur in the Second round of the Cup Winners' Cup, there was a wobble in League form with all eyes at Oriel Park on the upcoming glamour tie. They fell 10-points behind Bohemians, but subsequently charged to the title, sealing it on the final day away to defending champions Athlone. But it was Bohemians that came out of a four match, seven and a half hour FAI Cup semi-final marathon, depriving McLaughlin of a shot at a second League and Cup Double.

As FAI Cup holders from the season before, they qualified for the 1981–82 European Cup Winners' Cup. In the first round they drew Fram, and won through 5–2 on aggregate, with what remains their record victory in Europe – a 4–0 win in Oriel Park. In the second round, McLaughlin's unbeaten record in Europe at Oriel reached eight matches, when Tottenham Hotspur were held to a 1–1 draw. A 1–0 defeat in White Hart Lane ultimately ended their interest in the competition.

=== First-Team Squad (1981–82) ===
No.	Name	Years	League	FAI Cup	League Cup	Europe	Other^{a}	Total	Goals
1	(England) Richie Blackmore	1974–1985	30	7	1	4	5	47	0
2	(Republic of Ireland) Martin Lawlor	1977–1995	29	7	1	4	6	47	5
3	(Republic of Ireland) Paddy Dunning	1977–1983	29	7	0	4	4	44	2
4	(Republic of Ireland) Tommy McConville	1967–1986	30	7	1	4	5	47	0
5	(Republic of Ireland) Eamonn Gregg	1981–1983	30	7	1	4	3	45	1
6	(New Zealand) Sean Byrne	1977–1983	29	7	1	4	3	44	10
7	(Republic of Ireland) Barry Kehoe	1980–1993	30	7	1	4	5	46	7
8	(Republic of Ireland) Leo Flanagan	1978–1983	30	7	1	4	5	47	14
9	(Republic of Ireland) Mick Fairclough	1979–1984	27	7	1	4	3	42	20
10	(Republic of Ireland) Brian Duff	1977–1982	14	0	1	4	3	22	9
11	(Northern Ireland) Hilary Carlyle	1978–1984	22	4	0	4	1	31	12
12	(Republic of Ireland) Ollie Ralph	1981–1983	14	7	0	0	2	23	5
13	(Republic of Ireland) Willie Crawley	1977–1995	8	3	1	0	6	18	5
14	(Republic of Ireland) Jerome Clarke	1980–1982	15	5	0	0	4	24	1
15	(Republic of Ireland) John Archbold	1980–1983	8	2	1	4	1	16	1
16	(Republic of Ireland) Robbie Lawlor	1980–1983	5	4	1	0	5	15	1

a. Includes the Leinster Senior Cup and LFA President's Cup.

== Competitions ==
=== LFA President's Cup ===
21 August 1981	Dundalk	2–1	Athlone Town	Dundalk
				Stadium: Oriel Park

27 August 1981	Athlone Town	2–2	Dundalk	Athlone
				Stadium: St Mel's Park

Dundalk won 4–3 on aggregate

=== League Cup ===
First round

30 August 1981	Drogheda United	0–0 (a.e.t.) (5–4 p)	Dundalk	Drogheda
				Stadium: United Park

=== Leinster Senior Cup ===
First round

3 September 1981	Dundalk	6–0	Pegasus	Dundalk
				Stadium: Oriel Park

Quarter Final

30 September 1981	Dundalk	2–0	Drogheda United	Dundalk
				Stadium: Oriel Park

Semi-final

26 November 1981	Dundalk	3–1	Bohemians	Dublin

Final

27 January 1982	Dundalk	1–2	Shamrock Rovers	Dublin
				Stadium: Tolka Park; Attendance: 4,000

=== FAI Cup ===
First round

7 February 1982	Dundalk	1–0	Thurles Town	Dundalk
				Stadium: Oriel Park

Second round

17 February 1982	Dundalk	4–3	Cork United	Dundalk
				Stadium: Oriel Park

Quarter Final

7 March 1982	Dundalk	2–0	Galway United	Dundalk
				Stadium: Oriel Park

Semi-final

2 April 1982	Dundalk	3–3	Bohemians	Dublin
				Stadium: Tolka Park

Semi-final (first replay)

6 April 1982	Dundalk	0–0 (a.e.t.)	Bohemians	Dublin
				Stadium: Glenmalure Park

Semi-final (second replay)

14 April 1982	Dundalk	1–1 (a.e.t.)	Bohemians	Dublin
				Stadium: Tolka Park

Semi-final (third replay)

21 April 1982	Dundalk	1–2 (a.e.t.)	Bohemians	Dublin
				Stadium: Tolka Park

=== League ===
10 September 1981 Round 1	Dundalk	2–0	UCD

20 September 1981 Round 2	Cork United	0–2	Dundalk

27 September 1981 Round 3	Dundalk	3–0	Finn Harps

4 October 1981 Round 4	Shelbourne	0–3	Dundalk

11 October 1981 Round 5	Dundalk	4–0	Galway United

18 October 1981 Round 6	Thurles Town	0–0	Dundalk

25 October 1981 Round 7	Dundalk	1–4	Bohemians

1 November 1981 Round 8	Drogheda United	1–1	Dundalk

8 November 1981 Round 9	Dundalk	3–1	Waterford

15 November 1981 Round 10	Sligo Rovers	2–1	Dundalk

22 November 1981 Round 11	Dundalk	0–1	Shamrock Rovers

29 November 1981 Round 12	Home Farm	2–3	Dundalk

6 December 1981 Round 13	Dundalk	7–1	Athlone Town

13 December 1981 Round 14	Limerick	2–4	Dundalk

20 December 1981 Round 15	Dundalk	2–0	St Patrick's Athletic

27 December 1981 Round 16	UCD	1–1	Dundalk

3 January 1982 Round 17	Dundalk	3–0	Cork United

17 January 1982 Round 18	Dundalk	0–3	Shelbourne

24 January 1982 Round 19	Galway United	1–2	Dundalk

31 January 1982 Round 20	Dundalk	3–0	Thurles Town

14 February 1982 Round 21	Bohemians	0–0	Dundalk

21 February 1982 Round 22	Dundalk	5–1	Drogheda United

28 February 1982 Round 23	Waterford	1–1	Dundalk

14 March 1982 Round 24	Dundalk	1–0	Sligo Rovers

17 March 1982 Round 25	Finn Harps	0–2	Dundalk

21 March 1982 Round 26	Shamrock Rovers	1–1	Dundalk

28 March 1982 Round 27	Dundalk	2–1	Home Farm

11 April 1982 Round 28	Dundalk	1–0	Limerick

18 April 1982 Round 29	St Patrick's Athletic	0–1	Dundalk

25 April 1982 Round 30	Athlone Town	1–2	Dundalk

==== League table ====
Pos	Team	Pld	W	D	L	GF	GA	GD	Pts	Home/Away Win/Draw
1	Dundalk F.C.	30	20	6	4	61	24	+37	80	AW: 8; HW: 12; AD: 6; HD: 0
2	Shamrock Rovers F.C.	30	21	3	6	50	23	+27	76	AW: 9; HW: 12; AD: 1; HD: 2
3	Bohemian F.C.	30	17	9	4	50	18	+32	72	AW: 8; HW: 9; AD: 4; HD: 5
4	Athlone Town A.F.C.	30	18	3	9	70	42	+28	67	AW: 9; HW: 9; AD: 1; HD: 2
5	Sligo Rovers F.C.	30	16	5	9	55	45	+10	62	AW: 7; HW: 9; AD: 2; HD: 3
6	Limerick United F.C.	30	13	9	8	56	34	+22	58	AW: 5; HW: 8; AD: 5; HD: 4
7	St Patrick's Athletic F.C.	30	14	6	10	49	39	+10	56	AW: 5; HW: 9; AD: 3; HD: 3
8	Waterford F.C.	30	12	4	14	39	46	−7	47	AW: 6; HW: 6; AD: 1; HD: 3
9	Shelbourne F.C.	30	10	7	13	44	46	−2	45	AW: 5; HW: 5; AD: 3; HD: 4
10	Cork United F.C.	30	10	6	14	41	50	−9	42	AW: 2; HW: 8; AD: 4; HD: 2
11	Drogheda United F.C.	30	8	10	12	45	50	−5	41	AW: 2; HW: 6; AD: 5; HD: 5
12	Home Farm F.C.	30	8	7	15	34	48	−14	40	AW: 5; HW: 3; AD: 4; HD: 3
13	University College Dublin A.F.C.	30	7	10	13	30	41	−11	37	AW: 3; HW: 4; AD: 3; HD: 7
14	Finn Harps F.C.	30	7	4	19	42	61	−19	31	AW: 3; HW: 4; AD: 3; HD: 1
15	Galway United F.C.	30	5	8	17	30	62	−32	29	AW: 2; HW: 3; AD: 4; HD: 4
16	Thurles Town F.C.	30	3	5	22	29	96	−67	18	AW: 2; HW: 1; AD: 2; HD: 3

Source: rsssf.com
Rules for classification: Points system: 4 for an Away win, 3 for a Home win, 2 for an Away draw, 1 for a Home draw.

=== Europe ===
==== Cup Winners' Cup ====
First round

16 September 1981

Fram (Iceland)	2–1	(Republic of Ireland) Dundalk
Torfason 65'; Steinsson 85'	Report Report 2	Fairclough 35'

30 September 1981

Dundalk (Republic of Ireland)	4–0	(Iceland) Fram
Flanagan 4'; Fairclough 23'; M. Lawlor 49'; Duff 62'	Report Report 2

Dundalk won 5–2 on aggregate.

Second round

21 October 1981

Dundalk (Republic of Ireland)	1–1	(England) Tottenham Hotspur
Fairclough 82'	Report Report 2	Crooks 63'

4 November 1981

Tottenham Hotspur (England)	1–0	(Republic of Ireland) Dundalk
Crooks 63'	Report Report 2

== Awards ==
=== Player of the Month ===
Month	Player	References
September	(Republic of Ireland) Barry Kehoe	
April	(Republic of Ireland) Tommy McConville	
