= 1975–76 Dundalk F.C. season =

Dundalk
1975–76 season
- Manager: Jim McLaughlin
- League of Ireland: 1st (champions)
- FAI Cup: First round
- League Cup: Second round
- Leinster Senior Cup: First round
- Top goalscorer: League: Terry Flanagan (11); All: Terry Flanagan (11)
Home colours

Dundalk entered the 1975–76 season on the back of a fifth-place finish the previous season. 1975–76 was Jim McLaughlin's first full season as manager, having replaced John Smith in November 1974. It was Dundalk's 50th consecutive season in the top tier of Irish football.

== Season summary ==
The previous season had seen manager John Smith quit only two matches into the league programme for a new job outside football. Smith's resignation paved the way for the appointment of Jim McLaughlin as player-manager on 20 November 1974. But the Dundalk board that had taken control of the club in the summer of 1973 had already exhausted its available funding, and McLaughlin had been obliged to see what could be salvaged of the season with Smith's squad. His fifth-place finish was seen as "creditable", given the decline in the club's fortunes since the previous League title win in 1966–67. Going into the new season, he retained the players who had impressed, and signed a number of players who had been on the fringe at their clubs or were coming from non-League sides – reflecting the limited budget he was operating under.

The season opened with the League Cup in September, and McLaughlin's new side were knocked out in the second round. Louth rivals Drogheda United knocked them out of the Leinster Cup in the first round. The league schedule got under way on 5 October 1975, and saw a number of formerly successful clubs, such as Waterford, Cork Celtic and Cork Hibernians, all bring in fading stars from England – Bobby Charlton, George Best, Geoff Hurst and Rodney Marsh – in a bid to entice back the support they had lost as their fortunes had ebbed. Meanwhile, Dundalk, needing no circus acts, were soon in a two-way tussle with Finn Harps at the top of the table. Struggling for goals early on, the signing of Terry Flanagan from Bohemians in November, after what would be their only defeat of the season, allowed them to press on. A 2–0 victory in a top of the table clash away to Finn Harps in February, in which Flanagan scored both goals, saw Dundalk go clear in the table. They were knocked out in the first round of the FAI Cup a week later, but they dropped only two points in the League subsequently, before clinching the title by beating Cork Hibernians at home in front of a packed Oriel Park with a game to spare.

=== First-team squad (1975–76) ===
No.	Name	Years	League	FAI Cup	League Cup	Leinster Senior Cup	Total	Goals
1	(England) Richie Blackmore	1974–1985	26	1	3	1	31	0
2	(Republic of Ireland) Brian McConville	1964–1978	26	1	3	1	31	0
3	(Northern Ireland) Jim McLaughlin	1974–1983	26	1	3	0	30	1
4	(Republic of Ireland) Tommy McConville	1967–1986	25	1	3	1	30	4
5	(Northern Ireland) Jackie McManus	1973–1977	26	1	3	1	31	6
6	(Northern Ireland) Seamus McDowell	1975–1977	26	1	3	0	30	10
7	(England) Jimmy Dainty	1973–1980	25	1	3	1	30	7
8	(Northern Ireland) Sean McLoughlin	1975–1976	23	1	2	0	26	4
9	(Republic of Ireland) Terry Flanagan	1975–1978	18	1	0	0	19	11
10	(Republic of Ireland) Sean Sheehy	1970–1977	26	1	2	1	30	9
11	(Northern Ireland) Tony Cavanagh	1972–1977	24	1	2	1	28	3
12	(Northern Ireland) Con Davey	1973–1975	6	0	2	1	9	1
13	(Republic of Ireland) Paul Connellan	1974–1976	7	0	2	1	10	1
14	(England) Alan Spavin	1976	5	0	0	0	5	0
15	(Republic of Ireland) Joe Nicholl	1975–1976	2	0	3	0	5	2

== Competitions ==
=== League Cup ===
First round

14 September 1975	Shelbourne	0–3	Dundalk	Dublin
				Stadium: Harold's Cross Stadium

21 September 1975	Dundalk	3–1	Shelbourne	Dundalk
				Stadium: Oriel Park

Dundalk won 6–1 on aggregate

Second round

28 September 1975	Waterford	2–0	Dundalk	Waterford
				Stadium: Kilcohan Park

=== Leinster Senior Cup ===
First round

25 September 1975	Dundalk	1–2	Drogheda United	Dundalk
				Stadium: Oriel Park

=== FAI Cup ===
First round

15 February 1976	Cork Celtic	3–0	Dundalk	Cork
				Stadium: Turners Cross

=== League ===
5 October 1975 Round 1	Athlone Town	0–1	Dundalk

12 October 1975 Round 2	Dundalk	2–2	Home Farm

19 October 1975 Round 3	Limerick	1–4	Dundalk

26 October 1975 Round 4	Dundalk	2–2	St Patrick's Athletic

2 November 1975 Round 5	Cork Celtic	2–1	Dundalk

9 November 1975 Round 6	Dundalk	1–1	Finn Harps

16 November 1975 Round 7	Bohemians	1–1	Dundalk

23 November 1975 Round 8	Dundalk	4–1	Shelbourne

7 December 1975 Round 9	Drogheda United	1–2	Dundalk

14 December 1975 Round 10	Dundalk	5–2	Shamrock Rovers

21 December 1975 Round 11	Cork Hibernians	1–1	Dundalk

28 December 1975 Round 12	Dundalk	3–2	Sligo Rovers

30 December 1975 Round 13	Waterford	0–2	Dundalk

11 January 1976 Round 14	Home Farm	0–0	Dundalk

12 January 1976 Round 15	Dundalk	3–0	Athlone Town

18 January 1976 Round 16	Dundalk	1–0	Limerick

25 January 1976 Round 17	St Patrick's Athletic	2–2	Dundalk

1 February 1976 Round 18	Dundalk	3–2	Cork Celtic

8 February 1976 Round 19	Finn Harps	0–2	Dundalk

22 February 1976 Round 20	Dundalk	2–2	Bohemians

29 February 1976 Round 21	Shelbourne	1–2	Dundalk

14 March 1976 Round 22	Dundalk	1–1	Waterford

21 March 1976 Round 23	Dundalk	4–1	Drogheda United

28 March 1976 Round 24	Shamrock Rovers	0–3	Dundalk

4 April 1976 Round 25	Dundalk	1–0	Cork Hibernians

11 April 1976 Round 26	Sligo Rovers	1–1	Dundalk

==== League table ====
Pos	Team	Pld	W	D	L	GF	GA	GD	Pts
1	Dundalk F.C.	26	15	10	1	54	26	+28	40
2	Finn Harps F.C.	26	15	6	5	57	35	+22	36
3	Waterford F.C.	26	13	8	5	54	37	+17	34
4	Bohemian F.C.	26	10	12	4	44	25	+19	32
5	Cork Hibernians F.C.	26	11	9	6	37	24	+13	31
6	Drogheda United F.C.	26	11	6	9	42	45	−3	28
7	Athlone Town A.F.C.	26	12	4	10	40	49	−9	28
8	Cork Celtic F.C.	26	11	5	10	41	34	+7	27
9	Shelbourne F.C.	26	7	7	12	42	44	−2	21
10	Sligo Rovers F.C.	26	6	8	12	32	49	−17	20
11	St Patrick's Athletic F.C.	26	7	5	14	31	53	−22	19
12	Home Farm F.C.	26	4	9	13	35	54	−19	17
13	Limerick F.C.	26	6	4	16	37	49	−12	16
14	Shamrock Rovers F.C.	26	4	7	15	27	49	−22	15

Source: www.rsssf.com

== Awards ==
=== Player of the Month ===
Month	Player	References
March	(Northern Ireland) Seamus McDowell	
