= Paul Newe =

Irish footballer

Personal information
- Date of birth: 20 April 1964 (age 62)
- Place of birth: Dublin, Ireland
- Position: Forward

Youth career
- –1982: Shamrock Rovers

Senior career*
Years	Team	Apps	(Gls)
1982–1986	Shelbourne	89	(24)
1986–1987	Drogheda United	?	(12)
1987–1990	Dundalk	?	(19)
1990–1991	Shelbourne	27	(14)
1991–1992	→ Cobh Ramblers (loan)	18	(9)
1992–1993	St Patrick's Athletic	23	(4)
1993–1995	Monaghan United	38	(13)
1995–1996	Longford Town	?	(6)
1996–1997	Limerick	?	(2)
- * Club domestic league appearances and goals

Paul Newe (born 20 April 1964) is an Irish former footballer.

== Career ==
Newe began his career at Shamrock Rovers but failed to make a first team appearance. He made his League of Ireland debut with Shelbourne on 3 October 1982, and played with the club twice during the 1980s and 1990s, scoring 38 league goals in 116 league appearances. Newe also played for Drogheda United, Dundalk FC, Cobh Ramblers, St. Patrick's Athletic, Monaghan United, Longford Town and Limerick F.C.

While at Flancare Park Newe scored his 100th League of Ireland goal on 13 April 1996 at Cobh Ramblers.

At the end of the 2012 League of Ireland season Newe is joint fortieth in the all-time League of Ireland goalscoring list with 103 league goals
