= 2000–01 Dundalk F.C. season =

Dundalk
2000–01 season
- Manager: Martin Murray
- First Division: 1st (winners)
- FAI Cup: Second Round
- League Cup: Group (DNQ)
- Leinster Senior Cup: Competition abandoned
- Top goalscorer: League: Martin Reilly (20); All: Martin Reilly (21)
| Home colours | Away colours |

Dundalk entered the 2000–01 League of Ireland First Division season having finished fourth the previous season, thus missing out on a promotion/relegation play-off. Manager Martin Murray was entering his first season in charge, having replaced Terry Eviston during the summer. It was Dundalk's second season in the second tier of Irish football, and their 75th consecutive season in the League of Ireland.

== Season summary ==
Following the financial difficulties of the mid- and late-1990s, and relegation for the first time at the end of the 1998–99 season, the club had been taken over by the Dundalk F.C. Co-operative in March 2000, returning it to a supporter-owned, membership-based company model. The previous season there had been expectations of an immediate return to the top-flight, but a poor start left them struggling to catch the leaders and, with a play-off spot seemingly secured, the club became embroiled in a losing battle with the league's hierarchy and Kilkenny City. The row, over Kilkenny playing an improperly registered player, reached the High Court, who sided with Kilkenny thus handing them the play-off spot.

Relegation in 1999 had resulted in a large turnover of players – 31 different players making League appearances in the 1999–2000 season alone. With new ownership, and a new manager, there was more of the same. A number of local players had been retained from the previous season's squad, but another ten players were signed before and during the season, so that 21 players in total would make league starts. The previous season's disappointment, and the number of players coming and going, meant that hopes were low going into the new season. The 36-match schedule got under way on 11 August 2000, and Dundalk had a promising start, leading by the end of the month. But a slump in form saw them risk losing touch with fellow pace-setters, Athlone Town, obliging Murray to bring more players in. A victory over Athlone in November, and a five-game winning streak, kept the gap to four points as the other sides fell away.

The season was nearly derailed, however, when the 2001 United Kingdom foot-and-mouth outbreak lead to an exclusion zone being put in place around County Louth. Many public events were postponed or cancelled, and Dundalk went the whole of March without playing a match. They had beaten Shelbourne in the first round of the Leinster Senior Cup, but the crisis saw the competition ultimately abandoned for the season, and it would be 2010 before it was revived. In the second round of the FAI Cup they had been drawn against non-league Malahide United, and the game had been postponed four times as the crisis wore on. At the fifth attempt, the match was played behind closed doors at a neutral venue, and Dundalk were knocked out in the first match they had played in over five weeks. Two heavy league defeats followed as they struggled to get back up to speed, with home matches having to be played in United Park in Drogheda. But four consecutive wins, including a 2–1 victory over Athlone in the first match played in Oriel Park in over two months, meant Dundalk had won the First Division title (their first), and secured promotion back to the Premier Division for 2001–02 with a game to spare.

=== First-Team Squad (2000–01) ===
| No. | Name | Years | League | FAI Cup | League Cup | Leinster Cup | Total | Goals |
|---|---|---|---|---|---|---|---|---|
| 1 | (Republic of Ireland) John Connolly | 1999–2003 | 16 | 2 | 1 | 1 | 20 | 0 |
| 2 | (Republic of Ireland) David Crawley | 1997–2002 | 33 | 2 | 2 | 1 | 38 | 4 |
| 3 | (Republic of Ireland) Padraig Gollogley | 1997–2001 | 31 | 1 | 2 | 0 | 34 | 0 |
| 4 | (Republic of Ireland) Aaron Callaghan | 2000–2002 | 25 | 1 | 1 | 1 | 28 | 1 |
| 5 | (Republic of Ireland) Liam Dunne | 2000–2002 | 31 | 1 | 1 | 0 | 33 | 1 |
| 6 | (England) Ian Hill | 2000–2001 | 29 | 2 | 1 | 0 | 32 | 0 |
| 7 | (Republic of Ireland) John Flanagan | 1999–2008 | 34 | 2 | 1 | 1 | 38 | 8 |
| 8 | (Republic of Ireland) David Hoey | 1995–2006 | 26 | 2 | 1 | 0 | 29 | 1 |
| 9 | (Republic of Ireland) Martin Reilly | 2000–2003 | 36 | 2 | 0 | 0 | 38 | 21 |
| 10 | (Republic of Ireland) Greg O'Dowd | 2000–2001 | 30 | 1 | 1 | 1 | 33 | 5 |
| 11 | (Republic of Ireland) David Ward | 1997–2004 | 33 | 1 | 1 | 1 | 36 | 11 |
| 12 | (Republic of Ireland) Brian McKenna | 2000–2001 | 21 | 0 | 1 | 0 | 22 | 0 |
| 13 | (Republic of Ireland) Donal Broughan | 2000–2003 | 16 | 1 | 0 | 0 | 17 | 6 |
| 14 | (Republic of Ireland) Tommy Byrne | 2000–2001 | 17 | 2 | 0 | 0 | 19 | 1 |
| 15 | (Republic of Ireland) John Whyte | 1999–2003 | 11 | 2 | 1 | 1 | 15 | 0 |
| 16 | (Republic of Ireland) Brian Morrisroe | 1999–2001 | 11 | 1 | 1 | 0 | 13 | 1 |
| 17 | (Republic of Ireland) Eoin Mullen | 2000–2001 | 14 | 1 | 0 | 1 | 16 | 1 |
| 18 | (Republic of Ireland) Anto Reilly | 1999–2001 | 26 | 2 | 2 | 1 | 31 | 7 |
| 19 | (Republic of Ireland) John Ryan | 2000–2001 | 12 | 1 | 0 | 0 | 13 | 2 |
| 20 | (Republic of Ireland) Paddy Quinn | 1998–2001 | 9 | 0 | 2 | 1 | 12 | 0 |
| 21 | (Republic of Ireland) Padraig Staunton | 1999–2001 | 3 | 0 | 1 | 0 | 4 | 0 |

== Competitions ==
=== League Cup ===
Group

| 20 September 2000 | Home Farm | 2–0 | Dundalk | Dublin |
| | | | | Stadium: Whitehall |

| 25 September 2000 | Dundalk | 1–2 | Bohemians | Dundalk |
| | | | | Stadium: Oriel Park |

Did not qualify

=== Leinster Senior Cup ===
First round

| 5 December 2000 | Dundalk | 2–0 | Shelbourne | Dundalk |
| | | | | Stadium: Oriel Park |

Competition subsequently abandoned

=== FAI Cup ===
First round

| 6 January 2001 | Dundalk | 3–0 | Limerick | Dundalk |
| | | | | Stadium: Oriel Park |

Second round

| 1 April 2001 | Dundalk | 0–1 | Malahide United | Dublin |
| | | | | Stadium: Baldonnell |

=== First Division ===
| 11 August 2000 Round 1 | Limerick | 1–1 | Dundalk |

| 16 August 2000 Round 2 | Dundalk | 2–0 | St Francis |

| 18 August 2000 Round 3 | Drogheda United | 0–3 | Dundalk |

| 26 August 2000 Round 4 | Dundalk | 2–0 | Monaghan United |

| 31 August 2000 Round 5 | Dundalk | 1–0 | Waterford United |

| 5 September 2000 Round 6 | Sligo Rovers | 2–1 | Dundalk |

| 9 September 2000 Round 7 | Dundalk | 3–1 | Home Farm |

| 17 September 2000 Round 8 | Athlone Town | 1–1 | Dundalk |

| 30 September 2000 Round 9 | Dundalk | 2–2 | Cobh Ramblers |

| 5 October 2000 Round 10 | Dundalk | 1–1 | Limerick |

| 13 October 2000 Round 11 | St Francis | 2–6 | Dundalk |

| 19 October 2000 Round 12 | Dundalk | 1–0 | Drogheda United |

| 29 October 2000 Round 13 | Monaghan United | 1–1 | Dundalk |

| 3 November 2000 Round 14 | Waterford United | 1–1 | Dundalk |

| 9 November 2000 Round 15 | Dundalk | 3–1 | Sligo Rovers |

| 18 November 2000 Round 16 | Home Farm | 2–1 | Dundalk |

| 23 November 2000 Round 17 | Dundalk | 3–0 | Athlone Town |

| 3 December 2000 Round 18 | Cobh Ramblers | 3–2 | Dundalk |

| 14 December 2000 Round 19 | Dundalk | 7–0 | St Francis |

| 22 December 2000 Round 20 | Drogheda United | 0–3 | Dundalk |

| 13 January 2001 Round 21 | Dundalk | 1–0 | Waterford United |

| 20 January 2001 Round 22 | Sligo Rovers | 1–1 | Dundalk |

| 25 January 2001 Round 23 | Dundalk | 0–1 | Home Farm |

| 31 January 2001 Round 24 | Dundalk | 1–0 | Monaghan United |

| 9 February 2001 Round 25 | Athlone Town | 1–2 | Dundalk |

| 15 February 2001 Round 26 | Dundalk | 0–0 | Limerick |

| 18 February 2001 Round 27 | Dundalk | 3–2 | Cobh Ramblers |

| 23 February 2001 Round 28 | St Francis | 1–1 | Dundalk |

| 8 April 2001 Round 29 | Monaghan United | 0–4 | Dundalk |

| 10 April 2001 Round 30 | Waterford | 1–2 | Dundalk |

| 14 April 2001 Round 31 | Dundalk | 2–5 | Sligo Rovers |

| 21 April 2001 Round 32 | Home Farm | 1–2 | Dundalk |

| 24 April 2001 Round 33 | Limerick | 0–2 | Dundalk |

| 28 April 2001 Round 34 | Dundalk | 2–1 | Athlone Town |

| 1 May 2001 Round 35 | Dundalk | 1–0 | Drogheda United |

| 6 May 2001 Round 36 | Cobh Ramblers | 1–0 | Dundalk |

==== League table ====
| Pos | Club | Pld | W | D | L | GF | GA | GD | Pts | Notes |
|---|---|---|---|---|---|---|---|---|---|---|
| 1 | Dundalk F.C. | 36 | 20 | 9 | 7 | 65 | 38 | +27 | 69 | Promoted to Premier Division |
| 2 | Monaghan United F.C. | 36 | 18 | 11 | 7 | 59 | 40 | +19 | 65 | Promoted to Premier Division |
| 3 | Athlone Town A.F.C. | 36 | 18 | 10 | 8 | 53 | 37 | +16 | 64 | Lost promotion/relegation play-off |
| 4 | Sligo Rovers F.C. | 36 | 19 | 5 | 12 | 61 | 48 | +13 | 62 | |
| 5 | Waterford United F.C. | 36 | 16 | 13 | 7 | 56 | 30 | +26 | 61 | |
| 6 | Limerick F.C. | 36 | 13 | 11 | 12 | 40 | 39 | +1 | 50 | |
| 7 | Home Farm Fingal F.C. | 36 | 10 | 13 | 13 | 43 | 58 | -15 | 43 | |
| 8 | Cobh Ramblers F.C. | 36 | 10 | 6 | 20 | 43 | 60 | -17 | 36 | |
| 9 | Drogheda United F.C. | 36 | 4 | 9 | 23 | 27 | 62 | -35 | 21 | |
| 10 | Fingal–St. Francis F.C. | 36 | 3 | 11 | 22 | 29 | 64 | -35 | 20 | |

Source:www.rsssf.com
