= 1979 FAI Cup final =

Football match between Dundalk and Waterford

- Event: 1978–79 FAI Cup
Dundalk	Waterford
2	0
- Date: 22 April 1979
- Venue: Dalymount Park, Dublin
- Referee: Paddy Daly
- Attendance: 14,000

The 1979 FAI Cup final was the final match of the 1978–79 FAI Cup, a knock-out association football competition contested annually by clubs affiliated with the Football Association of Ireland. It took place on Sunday 22 April 1979 at Dalymount Park in Dublin, and was contested by Dundalk and Waterford. Mitre sponsored the campaign. Dundalk won the match 2–0 to win the cup for the sixth time, and, in so doing, won their first League and Cup Double.

== Background ==
Dundalk had already been confirmed League of Ireland Champions for 1978–79, and they were chasing their first League and Cup Double. The two sides' two previous meetings that season had been in the League, with Waterford winning both matches. The second of these was in Oriel Park, the night Dundalk had received the league trophy. Dundalk had won the cup in 1977. To reach the final they defeated St Patrick's Athletic (1–0), Finn Harps (2–0), and Cork Alberts (2–1).

Waterford had finished fourth in the League, three points behind Dundalk. They had not won the cup since their first victory in 1937 and had been defeated in their four previous appearances in the final, two of which had seen them miss out on League and Cup Doubles of their own, during a dominant period when they had won six league titles in eight seasons between 1964 and 1973. They overcame Bohemians (1–0 in a second replay following two 1–1 draws), Galway Rovers (1–0), and Shamrock Rovers (2–1).

The match was not broadcast live. Highlights were shown that evening on the RTÉ show Sports Scene.

== Match ==
=== Summary ===
Dundalk went into the match as most pundits' tip to win. However, Waterford were confident given the manner in which they had dispatched Shamrock Rovers in the semi-final and defeated Dundalk in the League. But Dundalk shocked their opponents by taking the lead after four minutes. There was controversy about the build up, as the linesman had flagged Hilary Carlyle as being offside, but was overruled by referee Daly. Carlyle crossed to Sean Byrne, who slipped as he lined up a left-foot, near post shot only to see the ball fly across the goal and into the net at the far post. Thereafter Dundalk attempted to play on the break and fashioned the better chances despite Waterford having more possession. Richie Blackmore was still required to make a number of good saves, including one from a Sid Wallace shot that seemed destined for the net. As the clock reached the 90 minute mark, Carlyle picked up a pass out of defence from Tommy McConville, shrugged off Waterford's player-manager, Tommy Jackson, and fired home to seal the victory, and the club's first Double. In the aftermath Jackson refused to complain about the referee, noting instead that his side had not responded well to going behind. Dundalk manager Jim McLaughlin said that Richie Blackmore's save from Sid Wallace convinced him that Dundalk were going to win.

=== Details ===
22 April 1979
15:30

Dundalk	2–0	Waterford
Sean Byrne 4'; Hilary Carlyle 90 + 1'	Report

Dalymount Park, Dublin
Attendance: 14,000
Referee: Paddy Daly

Dundalk	Waterford

GK	(England) Richie Blackmore
RB	(Republic of Ireland) Tommy McConville
CB	(Republic of Ireland) Dermot Keely
CB	(Republic of Ireland) Paddy Dunning
LB	(Republic of Ireland) Martin Lawlor
CM	(New Zealand) Sean Byrne
CM	(Republic of Ireland) Leo Flanagan
CM	(Republic of Ireland) Mick Lawlor (c)
RAM	(England) Jimmy Dainty
CF	(Republic of Ireland) Hilary Carlyle
CF	(Republic of Ireland) Cathal Muckian
Substitutes:
N/A
Manager:
(Northern Ireland) Jim McLaughlin

GK	(England) Peter Thomas
RB	(Republic of Ireland) Ger O'Mahony
CB	(Republic of Ireland) Al Finucane (c)
CB	(Republic of Ireland) Tony Dunphy
LB	(England) Brian Gardner
RM	(Northern Ireland) Tommy Jackson
CM	(Republic of Ireland) Michael Madigan
CM	(Republic of Ireland) Vinny McCarthy
LM	(England) John Matthews	(substituted off) 76'
CF	(Republic of Ireland) John Smith
CF	(England) Sid Wallace
Substitutes:
MF	(Republic of Ireland) Brendan Carey	(substituted on) 76'
Player-manager:
(Northern Ireland) Tommy Jackson
