= 1977 FAI Cup final =

Football competition

- Event: 1976–77 FAI Cup
| Dundalk | Limerick |
| 2 | 0 |
- Date: 1 May 1977
- Venue: Dalymount Park, Dublin
- Referee: Noel Breen
- Attendance: 14,000

The 1977 FAI Cup final was the final match of the 1976–77 FAI Cup, a knock-out association football competition contested annually by clubs affiliated with the Football Association of Ireland. It took place on Sunday 1 May 1977 at Dalymount Park in Dublin, and was contested by Dundalk and Limerick. Dundalk won 2–0 to win the cup for the fifth time.

== Background ==
The two sides' two previous meetings that season had been in the League, with one win for Dundalk and a draw. Limerick had come off a poor 1976–77, finishing 12th in the League, but had won that season's Munster Senior Cup. They had won their most recent cup final in 1971. To reach the 1977 final they had overcome Sligo Rovers, Waterford, and Drogheda United.

Defending league champions Dundalk had finished fifth, and were in their first FAI Cup final since winning in 1958. They had already won the Leinster Senior Cup that season. To reach the final, they had defeated non-League Pegasus (2–1), Cork Celtic (1–0), and St Patrick's Athletic (1–0 in a replay, following a 1–1 draw).

The match was not broadcast live. Highlights were shown that evening on the RTÉ show Sports Scene.

== Match ==
=== Summary ===
Going into the match Dundalk were seen as strong favourites. Limerick started the match strongly, however, creating a succession of chances – Limerick's Dave Kirby hitting the crossbar and Dundalk's Synan Braddish having to clear off the line with his head, with goalkeeper Richie Blackmore stranded. An injury to Limerick winger John Walsh in the 25th minute, which saw him withdrawn in the 31st, appeared to distract them, however. Dundalk took a 33rd-minute lead against the run of play, when player-manager Jim McLaughlin crossed for Terry Flanagan to tap home. Thereafter, Limerick lost their composure and the final was settled three minutes from time, when Flanagan headed home a Seamus McDowell corner. The match was stopped briefly in the second half due to stone and bottle throwing by Limerick fans, but an intervention from Limerick manager Frankie Johnston cooled the situation.

=== Details ===
1 May 1977
15:30

| Dundalk | 2–0 | Limerick |
|---|---|---|
| Flanagan 33', 87' | Report |

Dalymount Park, Dublin
Attendance: 14,000 (Note: Official attendance from gate receipts. Other reports put attendance at 17,000.)
Referee: Noel Breen

| Dundalk | Limerick |

| GK | (England) Richie Blackmore |
| RB | (Republic of Ireland) Brian McConville |
| CB | (Republic of Ireland) Tommy McConville |
| CB | (Northern Ireland) Jackie McManus (c) |
| LB | (Northern Ireland) Jim McLaughlin |
| RM | (England) Jimmy Dainty |
| CM | (Northern Ireland) Seamus McDowell |
| CM | (Republic of Ireland) Synan Braddish |
| LM | (Northern Ireland) Tony Cavanagh |
| CF | (Republic of Ireland) Terry Flanagan |
| CF | (Republic of Ireland) Mick Lawlor |
Substitutes:
N/A
Manager:
(Northern Ireland) Jim McLaughlin

| GK | (Republic of Ireland) Kevin Fitzpatrick |
| RB | (Republic of Ireland) John Herrick |
| CB | (Republic of Ireland) Tony Fitzgerald (c) |
| CB | (Republic of Ireland) Joe O'Mahoney |
| LB | (Republic of Ireland) Pat Nolan |
| RM | (Republic of Ireland) Dave Kirby |
| CM | (Republic of Ireland) Tony Meaney |
| CM | (Republic of Ireland) Eamonn Deacy |
| LM | (Republic of Ireland) Johnny Walsh | (substituted off) 31' |
| CF | (Republic of Ireland) Ger Duggan |
| CF | (Republic of Ireland) Des Kennedy |
Substitutes:
| LB | (Republic of Ireland) Denis Lymer | (substituted on) 31' |
Manager:
(Republic of Ireland) Frankie Johnston
