= Harry McCue =

Irish footballer (born 1957)

Personal information
- Date of birth: 8 July 1957 (age 69)
- Place of birth: Dublin, Ireland
- Positions: Defender; midfielder

Youth career
- St Michans
- Home Farm

Senior career*
Years	Team	Apps	(Gls)
1975-1976	Home Farm	9	(1)
1976-1977	Shamrock Rovers	13	(0)
1977-1983	Athlone Town	91	(3)
1983	San Diego Sockers	5	(1)
1983-1985	Glentoran	29	(1)
1984-1985	Drogheda United (loan)	4	(0)
1985-1988	Dundalk	43	(0)
1988-1991	Warringah Dolphins	52	(0)

Managerial career
- 1991-96: Warringah Dolphins
- 2000-03: Drogheda United
- * Club domestic league appearances and goals

Harry McCue (born 8 July 1957) is an Irish former association football player who alternately played as a defender and a midfielder. In a playing career spanning over 30 years, McCue represented Home Farm, Shamrock Rovers, Athlone Town A.F.C., Drogheda United and Dundalk in the League of Ireland. He also enjoyed spells in the United States, Northern Ireland, and Australia. Aa a player, he was a three-time winner of the League of Ireland.

== Early career ==
McCue was raised on the Fruit Markets district of North Dublin where he began playing football with local team St Michans.

== San Diego Sockers ==
During the summer of 1983, McCue was part of the roster of the North American Soccer League (NASL) team San Diego Sockers, wearing the number 6 and 19 shirts. The Sockers would finish last in the Western Division.

== Glentoran and Drogheda ==
After his summer stint with the Sockers, McCue joined Northern Irish League side Glentoran in Belfast. With the Glens he was a runner-up in the 1983-84 league season but won the Ulster Cup that same year. He lined out twice for Glentoran in the 1984-85 UEFA Cup, starting in both games as they drew 1–1 and then lost 2–0 away to Belgian giants Standard Liège. Prior to the first-leg, McCue had been blessed by the Reverend Ian Paisley.

== Honours ==
Athlone Town

- League of Ireland: 1980-81, 1982-83
- League of Ireland Cup: 1981–82, 1982–83
- Tyler Cup: 1979

Dundalk

- League of Ireland: 1987-88
- FAI Cup: 1987–88
- League of Ireland Cup: 1986–87

Glentoran

- Ulster Cup: 1983–84

Drogheda United (as manager)

- League of Ireland First Division: 2001–02 League of Ireland First Division
