= Dessie Gorman =

Irish former professional footballer (born 1964)

Personal information
- Full name: Desmond Gorman
- Date of birth: 13 December 1964 (age 61)
- Place of birth: Manchester, England
- Position: Striker

Youth career
- 1984–1985: Dundalk

Senior career*
Years	Team	Apps	(Gls)
1985–1989	Dundalk	?	(38)
1989–1990	FC Bourges	?	(?)
1990–1991	Derry City	28	(7)
1991–1992	Shelbourne	41	(8)
1992–1997	Linfield	?	(?)
1997–2000	Newry Town	?	(?)
2000–2001	Bangor	?	(?)
2000–2001	Ards	33	(18)
2001–2003	Banbridge Town	?	(?)
2003	Dundalk	?	(0)
2003–2004	Ards	1	(0)
2007	Loughgall	?	(?)
- * Club domestic league appearances and goals

Desmond Gorman (born 13 December 1964) is an Irish former professional footballer who played for a number of clubs on both sides of the Irish border.

== Career ==
Gorman started his career with Dundalk, making his League of Ireland debut on 10 March 1985. His form attracted the attention of English side Arsenal, and he played for them in a friendly against Shamrock Rovers at Glenmalure Park in August 1986. While at Dundalk he won all domestic honours, and was top scorer during both the 1985–86 (with 11 goals) and 1987–88 (with 16 goals) seasons. In 1989, he moved to French club FC Bourges who he helped win promotion, and then to Derry City in October 1990. In the summer of 1991 he moved to Shelbourne, before signing with Linfield in December 1992. He stayed with Linfield until 1997, before playing with Newry Town, Bangor, Ards, Banbridge Town. He returned briefly to Dundalk in 2003, before retiring. He came out of retirement in 2007 to play briefly for Loughgall.
