= Michael O'Connor (footballer, born 1960) =

Irish footballer and manager

Personal information
- Date of birth: 8 October 1960 (age 66)
- Place of birth: Athlone, Ireland
- Position: Forward

Senior career*
Years	Team	Apps	(Gls)
1979–1985	Athlone Town	151	(79)
1985–1987	Shamrock Rovers	18	(3)
1987–1988	Dundalk	25	(6)
1988–1996	Athlone Town	?	(29)

International career
1982–1984	League of Ireland XI	?	(0)
1981	Republic of Ireland U21	1	(0)

Managerial career
- 1992–1996: Athlone Town
- 1996–1998: Longford Town
- 2006–2007: Athlone Town
- 2013: Athlone Town (assistant)
- * Club domestic league appearances and goals

Michael O'Connor (born 8 October 1960) is an Irish former football player and manager. He is the unofficial director of Athlone Town.

== Club career ==
O'Connor made his League of Ireland debut for Athlone Town on 4 March 1979. During his time at St Mel's Park, he was twice top scorer in the League of Ireland in 1981–82 and 1984–85. He is also the all-time leading scorer for Athlone. He scored against Kjøbenhavns Boldklub (KB) in the first round of the 1981–82 European Cup.

O'Connor signed for Shamrock Rovers in October 1985 and made his debut in a 3–0 win over Bohemians on 27 October. He scored his first goal for the Hoops on 17 November 1985 at Home Farm. He played in a memorable friendly win over Arsenal in February 1986, when his fellow Athlone man and ex-teammate Noel Larkin scored the winner. He played no part of the 1986–87 season due to a broken leg. He made one appearance in the European Cup in September 1987. He left in October 1987 to sign for Dundalk, then managed by his brother Turlough O'Connor, where he stayed for one season before returning to his hometown club. In May 1995, he scored the decisive penalty to keep Athlone in the Premier Division.

O'Connor is joint twenty-eighth in the all-time League of Ireland goalscoring list with 117 league goals.

== International career ==
On 25 February 1981, O'Connor played for Republic of Ireland U21 at Anfield.

== Management career ==
In May 1992, O'Connor was appointed player manager at Athlone Town. In the 1993–94 League of Ireland First Division season, he guided them to promotion. However, they got relegated by penalties in 1996 with O'Connor retiring as a player and resigning as manager.

He was appointed manager again for a second spell for the 2006 season. His first game in charge was also the club's first game at their new stadium in Lissywoollen but he resigned in July 2007.

== Sources ==
- Paul Doolan; Robert Goggins. The Hoops. ISBN 0-7171-2121-6.
