= 1981 FAI Cup final =

- Event: 1980–81 FAI Cup
Dundalk	Sligo Rovers
2	0
- Date: 26 April 1981
- Venue: Dalymount Park, Dublin
- Referee: Paddy Mulhall
- Attendance: 12,000

The 1981 FAI Cup final was the final match of the 1980–81 FAI Cup, a knock-out association football competition contested annually by clubs affiliated with the Football Association of Ireland. It took place on Sunday 26 April 1981 at Dalymount Park in Dublin, and was contested by Dundalk and Sligo Rovers. The competition was sponsored by Mitre. Dundalk won the match 2–0 to win the cup for the seventh time.

== Background ==
The two sides' two previous meetings that season had been in the League, with Dundalk winning both matches – including a 3–0 victory in The Showgrounds in Sligo two weeks earlier. Dundalk had finished as runners-up in the 1980–81 League of Ireland, and had already won that season's League Cup. To reach the final they had defeated non-League Hammond Lane (1–0), St Patrick's Athletic (2–0 in a replay following a 1–1 draw), Drogheda United (1–0 in a replay following a 0–0 draw), and Finn Harps (1–0).

Sligo Rovers were the underdogs, having finished 11th in the League, and were playing in their fifth FAI Cup final. They had lost in all four of their previous appearances, most recently in 1978. They had overcome UCD (2–1 in a replay following a 1–1 draw), Home Farm (3–0), and Waterford (1–0 in a replay following a 2–2 draw) to reach the final.

The match was not broadcast live. Highlights were shown that evening on the RTÉ show Sports Scene, with commentary from Jimmy Magee.

== Match ==
=== Summary ===
Dundalk were made heavy favourites going into the match, which both managers sought to use as motivation for their players. The match, described in press reports as "wind-spoiled", had an undistinguished first half, but seven minutes into the second half a corner taken by John Archbold sailed straight into the net without being touched by anyone. Sligo subsequently pressed hard for an equaliser, but were well-marshalled by the experienced Dundalk defence. In the 78th minute, one such Sligo attack broke down, and Mick Fairclough latched onto a long clearance by Sean Byrne to race through and score Dundalk's second to seal the win. The victory gave Dundalk their only FAI Cup and League Cup Double.

=== Details ===
26 April 1981
15:30

Dundalk	2–0	Sligo Rovers
John Archbold 52'; Mick Fairclough 78'	Report

Dalymount Park, Dublin
Attendance: 12,000
Referee: Paddy Mulhall

Dundalk	Sligo Rovers

GK	(England) Richie Blackmore
RB	(Republic of Ireland) Tommy McConville
CB	(Republic of Ireland) Dermot Keely
CB	(Republic of Ireland) Paddy Dunning
LB	(Republic of Ireland) Martin Lawlor	(substituted off) 66'
RM	(New Zealand) Sean Byrne
CM	(Republic of Ireland) Leo Flanagan
CM	(Republic of Ireland) Vincent McKenna
LM	(Republic of Ireland) John Archbold
CF	(Republic of Ireland) Mick Fairclough
CF	(Republic of Ireland) Willie Crawley	(substituted off) 79'
Substitutes:
MF	(Northern Ireland) Tony O'Doherty	(substituted on) 66'
MF	(Republic of Ireland) Brian Duff	(substituted on) 79'
Manager:
(Northern Ireland) Jim McLaughlin

GK	(Republic of Ireland) Declan McIntyre
RB	(Republic of Ireland) Michael Ferry
CB	(Republic of Ireland) Paddy Sheridan
CB	(Northern Ireland) Donal O'Doherty	(substituted off) 83'
LB	(Republic of Ireland) Charlie McGeever
RM	(Republic of Ireland) Liam Patton	(substituted off) 80'
CM	(Republic of Ireland) Tony Fagan
CM	(Republic of Ireland) Gerry Doherty
LM	(Republic of Ireland) Harry McLaughlin
CF	(Republic of Ireland) Brendan Bradley
CF	(Republic of Ireland) Jimmy McGroarty
Substitutes:
MF	(Republic of Ireland) Pat Coyle	(substituted on) 80'
MF	(Republic of Ireland) Martin McDonnell	(substituted on) 83'
Manager:
(Republic of Ireland) Patsy McGowan
