= Gino Lawless =

Irish footballer

Personal information
- Full name: Eugene Lawless
- Date of birth: 14 January 1959 (age 67)
- Place of birth: Dublin, Ireland
- Position: Midfielder

Youth career
- Cambridge Boys

Senior career*
Years	Team	Apps	(Gls)
1978–1986	Bohemians	210	(19)
1986–1994	Dundalk	227	(10)
1994	Athlone Town	11	(0)
1994–1996	Bohemians	17	(0)
1996–1997	Home Farm Everton	20	(0)

International career
1982–1984	League of Ireland XI		
- * Club domestic league appearances and goals

Gino Lawless (born 14 January 1959) was an Irish soccer player during the 1970s, 1980s and 1990s.

== Career ==
He represented Bohemians and Dundalk with great success during his career. Gino made his debut for Bohs on 10 September 1978 after signing from Cambridge Boys. After trialling with Manchester United in the summer of 1979, Lawless was offered terms

He is most famous for scoring the winner during the 3-2 win over Rangers in the UEFA Cup in September 1984. Was awarded the Player of the Month for his European exploits .

After 310 appearances in all competitions for Bohs, Gino signed for Dundalk in 1986. He won 2 League of Ireland titles and an FAI Cup winners medal while at Oriel Park and played his last game for them during the 1993/94 season.

Earned two caps for the Republic of Ireland U21 side.
