= Terry Eviston =

Irish footballer & manager (born 1957)

Personal information
- Full name: Terence Eviston
- Date of birth: 17 July 1957 (age 69)
- Place of birth: Dublin, Ireland
- Position: Striker

Youth career
- St Martin Boys Club

Senior career*
Years	Team	Apps	(Gls)
1975–1978	Home Farm	?	(3)
1978–1983	Bohemians	110	(31)
1983–1984	Shamrock Rovers	15	(0)
1984–1986	Athlone Town	43	(16)
1986–1993	Dundalk	?	(40)
1993–1996	Shamrock Rovers	60	(6)
1996–1997	Athlone Town	19	(4)
1997–1998	Cobh Ramblers	21	(1)

International career
1980–	League of Ireland XI	?	(?)

Managerial career
- 1996: Shamrock Rovers
- 1996–1997: Athlone Town
- 1999–2000: Dundalk
- 2013–: Raheny United
- * Club domestic league appearances and goals

Terry Eviston (born 17 July 1957) was an Irish footballer who played for Home Farm, Bohemians, Athlone Town A.F.C., Dundalk and two spells with Shamrock Rovers. He is the manager of Raheny United in the Women's National League (Ireland).

Terry Eviston made an appearance in 2018 movie "On The Ball" as himself.

== Playing career ==
Eviston made his League of Ireland debut for Home Farm at Tolka Park on 2 November 1975. On 7 August 1976, Home Farm played Everton in a pre season friendly at Goodison Park. Twenty years later the same club provided the opposition in Eviston's testimonial.

In 1978, he joined Bohemians and was their top scorer in the league in 1980/81 with 9 goals from 20 games (1 as substitute). In total he played 110 league games (99 plus 11 as sub) scoring 31 league goals. He made a scoring debut for Bohs on 10 September 1978. He made 6 appearances in European competition for Bohs against AC Omonia and Dynamo Dresden in the 1978–79 European Cup and Sporting Clube de Portugal in the 1979–80 UEFA Cup.

On 30 April 1980, he represented the League of Ireland against Argentina at the River Plate Stadium where Diego Maradona scored in a 1–0 defeat and on 3 September 1981 Terry was part of a League of Ireland side that played Brazil in Maceió. During that season he was the club captain at Dalymount. His last game for Bohs was the 1983 FAI Cup Final loss.

After five seasons at Dalymount Park, Rovers new manager Jim McLaughlin (footballer) signed Terry in July 1983. In his first season at Milltown, Rovers won the League for the first time in twenty years.

After 2 goals in 25 total appearances Terry transferred to Athlone Town A.F.C. in November 1984. He made his debut at Sligo on the 18th and until he signed for Dundalk in the summer of 1986 he played in all 43 league games in that period.

In his seven years at Oriel Park, he won the League twice, the FAI Cup once and the League of Ireland Cup twice and won the Soccer Writers' Personality of the Year award in 1987–88. He was also Player of the Month in March 1988. He also made 6 appearances in European competition for Dundalk against AFC Ajax in the 1987–88 European Cup Winners' Cup, against Red Star Belgrade in the 1988–89 European Cup and Budapest Honvéd FC in the 1991–92 European Cup.

In the 1990–91 League of Ireland season, Eviston was everpresent in the league scoring 10 goals as Dundalk won the league on the last day at Cork with Eviston playing a role in Tom McNulty's winner.

He rejoined Rovers in the summer of 1993 and scored 6 goals in 25 appearances as he picked up his fourth League medal in his first season back in the Hoops. He made one appearance for Rovers in the 1994–95 UEFA Cup. His last game for Rovers was the final game of the 1995–96 League of Ireland season.

In May 1996, a League of Ireland XI played Everton in Eviston's testimonial at Dalymount Park.

He won an Irish amateur cap against Greece in 1978 and an Olympic cap against Hungary in 1986.

His 101st and last League of Ireland goal was the winner for Cobh against Galway United on 20 September 1997. Cobh goalkeeper Nicky Byrne saved a penalty to ensure the home side their first win of that season.

At the end of the 2012 League of Ireland season, Newe is joint forty first in the all-time League of Ireland goalscoring list with 101 league goals

Eviston was left footed and played outside left, striker and left back.

== Management career ==
After the sacking of Ray Treacy in January 1996, Terry, along with Alan O'Neill, was appointed manager of the club.

Alan and Terry were surprisingly sacked after two games of the 1996–97 season. He then went on to be player/manager at Athlone Town F.C. where he scored his 100th league goal.

In June 1999, he was appointed manager of Dundalk who were then in the League of Ireland First Division. In May 2000 his contract was not renewed.

In July 2004, he was appointed assistant to Roddy Collins at Dublin City In November 2004 both moved to Shamrock Rovers. When Roddy Collins was sacked at the end of that season Terry left the club. Terry is currently manager of Raheny United in the Women's National League (Ireland).

== Honours ==
=== As a player ===
- League of Ireland: 4
  - Shamrock Rovers 1983/84, 1993/1994
  - Dundalk 1987/88, 1990/1991
- FAI Cup: 1
  - Dundalk 1988
- League of Ireland Cup: 3
  - Dundalk 1987, 1990
  - Bohemians 1979
- Leinster Senior Cup (association football): 2
  - Bohemians – 1978/79, 1979/80
- LFA President's Cup
  - Shamrock Rovers 1984/85
- SWAI Personality of the Year: 1
  - Dundalk 1987/88

=== As a manager ===
- FAI Women's Cup
  - Raheny United 2013

== Sources ==
- Paul Doolan; Robert Goggins. The Hoops. ISBN 0-7171-2121-6.
- Terry Eviston Testimonial Match Programme 10 May 1996
