= Alan O'Neill (footballer, born 1957) =

Irish footballer and manager

Personal information
- Date of birth: 2 July 1957 (age 69)
- Place of birth: Dublin, Republic of Ireland
- Position: Goalkeeper

Youth career
- St Malachy's

Senior career*
Years	Team	Apps	(Gls)
1975–1983	Shamrock Rovers	143	(0)
1983–1985	UCD	56	(0)
1985–1993	Dundalk	233	(0)
1993–1996	Shamrock Rovers	98	(0)
1996–1997	Sligo Rovers	16	(0)
Total		546	(0)

International career
1978–1979	Republic of Ireland U21	2	(0)
1979–1995	League of Ireland XI	?	(0)

Managerial career
- 1996: Shamrock Rovers
- 2005: Shamrock Rovers
- * Club domestic league appearances and goals

Alan O'Neill (born 2 July 1957 in Dublin) is an Irish football goalkeeper who played in the League of Ireland in the 1970s, 1980s and 1990s.

== Playing career ==
He represented the League of Ireland XI representative side twice in 1979 and 1980 and was called into the Republic of Ireland national football team as cover in October 1979.

In June 1985 he signed for Dundalk F.C.

O'Neill kept his 200th clean sheet in a 1–0 win over Sligo in the RDS Arena in September 1994.

== Management career ==
After losing the first game of the 1996/97 the Rovers faithful were stunned when O'Neill and Terry were sacked. O'Neill then signed for Sligo Rovers F.C. keeping a clean sheet on his debut on 5 October 1996. His final League of Ireland game was at Finn Park in April 1997.

O'Neill stepped in to manage Rovers for the playoff games with Dublin City at the end of the 2005 season.

In 2006 O'Neill became a Shamrock Rovers legend.

== Sources ==
- The Hoops by Paul Doolan and Robert Goggins (ISBN 0-7171-2121-6)
