= Tommy McConville =

Irish footballer

Personal information
- Full name: Thomas McConville
- Date of birth: 19 March 1946
- Place of birth: Dundalk, Ireland
- Date of death: 25 October 2013 (aged 67)

Senior career*
Years	Team	Apps	(Gls)
1964–1966	Dundalk	2	(0)
1966–1967	Bangor	7	(1)
1967–1972	Dundalk	92	(3)
1972–1973	Waterford	27	(7)
1973–1975	Shamrock Rovers	41	(11)
1974–1976	Washington Diplomats	57	(1)
1975–1986	Dundalk	293	(12)
1978	→ New York Apollo (loan)		
1986–1987	Finn Harps	15	(0)
1987–1988	Newry Town		
19??–1993	Bank Rovers		

International career
	League of Ireland XI	?	(?)
1971–1973	Republic of Ireland	6	(0)

Managerial career
- 1986–1987: Finn Harps
- * Club domestic league appearances and goals

Tommy McConville (19 March 1946 – 25 October 2013) was an Irish professional footballer.

== Career ==
McConville was put on the transfer list in September 1974. He earned his first international cap for the Republic of Ireland national football team on 10 October 1971 in a 6–0 defeat to Austria.
