= Jim McLaughlin (footballer) =

Northern Irish footballer and manager (1940–2024)

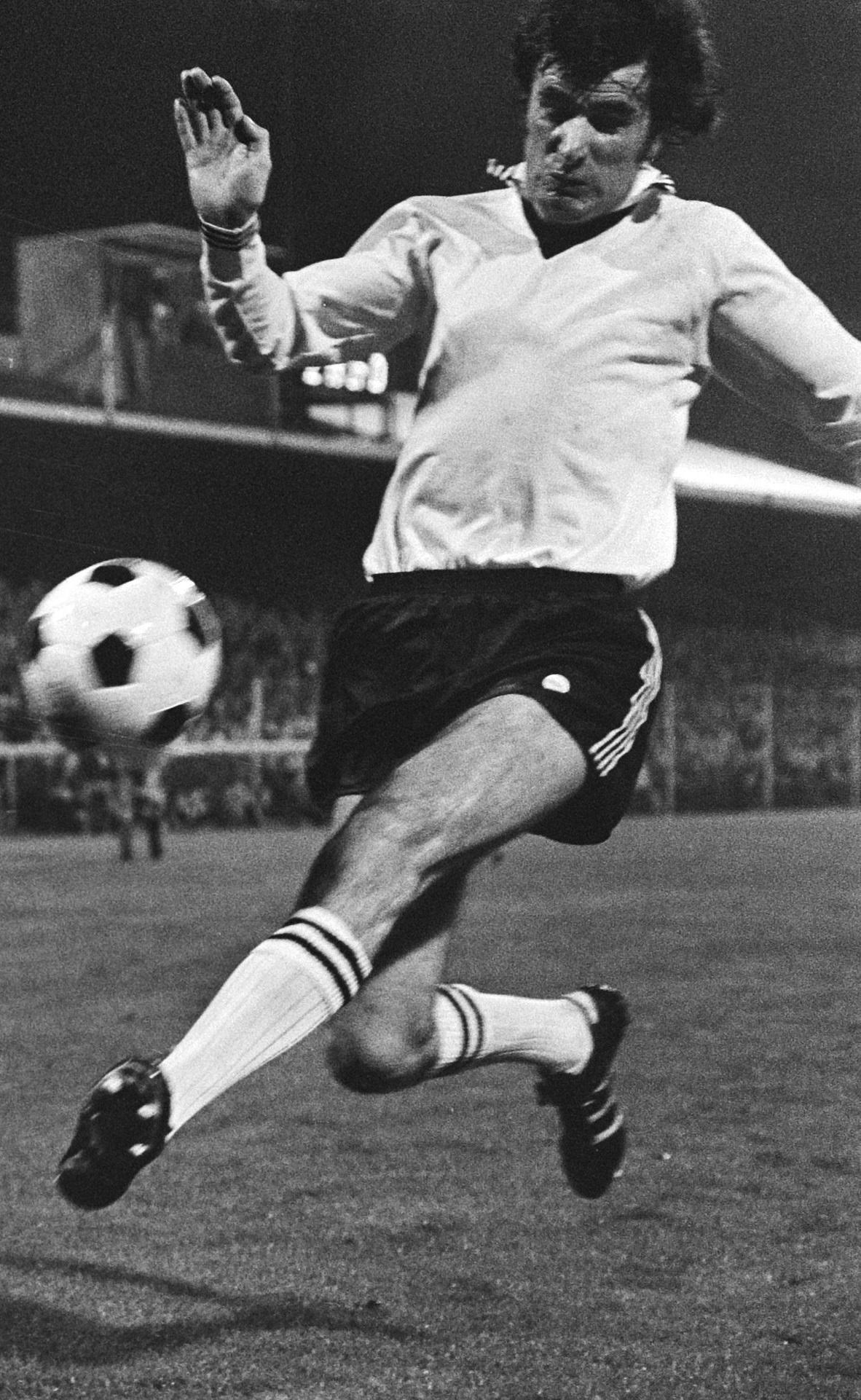
- McLaughlin in 1976

Personal information
- Full name: James Christopher McLaughlin
- Date of birth: 22 December 1940
- Place of birth: Derry, Northern Ireland
- Date of death: 15 August 2024 (aged 83)
- Position: Striker

Senior career*
| Years | Team | Apps | (Gls) |
| 1957–1958 | Derry City | ? | (13) |
| 1958–1960 | Birmingham City | 0 | (0) |
| 1960–1963 | Shrewsbury Town | 124 | (56) |
| 1963–1967 | Swansea Town | 123 | (45) |
| 1967 | Peterborough United | 8 | (2) |
| 1967–1972 | Shrewsbury Town | 173 | (21) |
| 1972–1974 | Swansea City | 28 | (2) |
| 1974–1979 | Dundalk | 113 | (4) |

International career
| 1961–1966 | Northern Ireland | 12 | (6) |
| 1963–1964 | Northern Ireland U23 | 2 | (2) |

Managerial career
- 1974–1983: Dundalk
- 1983–1986: Shamrock Rovers
- 1986–1991: Derry City
- 1993–1996: Drogheda United
- 1997–1999: Dundalk
- * Club domestic league appearances and goals

James Christopher McLaughlin (22 December 1940 – 15 August 2024) was a Northern Irish footballer and was a football manager in the League of Ireland.

== Playing career ==
The 16-year-old McLaughlin made his Irish League debut for home-town club Derry City in the 1957–58 season. He scored in his first match, against Crusaders, and was his club's top scorer, with 16 goals, in that debut season. He joined English First Division club Birmingham City as an apprentice in the summer of 1958.

After two years of reserve team football he moved on to Shrewsbury Town. In his first season there McLaughlin netted twenty goals for his club. Having gained three youth caps with Derry City his efforts at Shrewsbury did not go unnoticed by the IFA and he was capped by them twice at under-23 level.

He went on the international stage scoring on his debut against Scotland in October 1961. McLaughlin scored two goals against England in 1964 despite breaking two fingers early in the game. In total, he won 12 caps and scored six goals with Northern Ireland.

Early in the 1963–64 season McLaughlin moved to Swansea Town, for whom he scored the winner in a FA Cup quarter-final tie at the Kop end at Anfield, and then in 1966–67 to Peterborough United. He then moved back to Shrewsbury for three more seasons, before becoming coach there. In 1972 McLaughlin moved back to Swansea as player-coach firstly and then as secretary.

== Managerial career ==
McLaughlin's sixteen and a half-year reign in England came to an end when in November 1974 he accepted an offer to player/manage Dundalk and that was to be the beginning of his managerial career.

As a manager, he had great success and during his nine-year stay at Oriel Park he led them to three Leagues and the FAI Cup three times including the double in the 1978–79 season. Dundalk performed commendably in Europe during this period. In the 1979–80 season they reached the last 16 of the European Cup and were drawn with Celtic. Following a 3–2 defeat in Glasgow, Dundalk drew 0–0 at home and missed an opportunity to score a goal that would have put them through on away goals. In the 1981–82 Cup-Winners' Cup campaign, Dundalk once more reached the last 16 and lost 3–2 on aggregate to Tottenham Hotspur.

On 21 June 1983, McLaughlin took over at Shamrock Rovers and led the Milltown club to three League Championships and two FAI Cups in three seasons including two back to back doubles.

On 13 May 1986, he left Rovers to go home and manage Derry City where he led the team to a domestic treble in 1989. His managerial spell at the club lasted from 1986 until 1991. He later went on to co-manage Shelbourne with Pat Byrne where another League was won in 1992. In November 1993 he took over at Drogheda United where he stayed for three seasons getting relegated twice and promoted in 1994–95.

He had another spell with Dundalk but could not prevent them from being relegated and so his managerial career came to a close in May 1999. He became a director in Oriel Park in July 1996.

He also took charge of the League of Ireland XI and the Irish Olympic side.

He was Manager of the Year in 1986 and in February 2002, McLaughlin was awarded the FAI Special Merit Award in recognition of his achievements and dedication within the domestic game. Later in the year, he was the Shamrock Rovers Hall of Fame recipient and in 2005, he was inducted into the Shamrock Rovers 'Legends'.

In January 2010 he was awarded the SWAI Special Merit Award in recognition to his contribution to Irish football.

== Personal life and death ==
McLaughlin's son Paul played for Dundalk, Newry City, Derry City and Drogheda United. His grandson Ben played for Dundalk, Everton and Derry City.

McLaughlin died on 15 August 2024, aged 83.

== Honours ==
=== As a player ===
Swansea City

- Welsh Cup: 1966

Dundalk

- FAI Cup: 1977

=== As a manager ===
Dundalk

- League of Ireland: 1975–76, 1978–79, 1981–82
- FAI Cup: 1977, 1979, 1981
- League of Ireland Cup: 1977–78, 1980–81

Shamrock Rovers

- League of Ireland: 1983–84, 1984–85, 1985–86
- FAI Cup: 1985, 1986
- Dublin City Cup: 1983–84

Derry City

- League of Ireland Premier Division: 1988–89
- FAI Cup: 1989
- League of Ireland Cup: 1988–89, 1990–91

Shelbourne

- League of Ireland Premier Division: 1991–92

=== Individual ===
- SWAI Personality of the Year: 1978–79, 1983–84, 1988–89

== Sources ==
- Paul Doolan; Robert Goggins (1993). The Hoops. Gill & MacMillan. ISBN 0-7171-2121-6.
- Robert Goggins. The Four-in-a-Row Story.
