= List of Dundalk F.C. records and statistics =

Dundalk F.C.
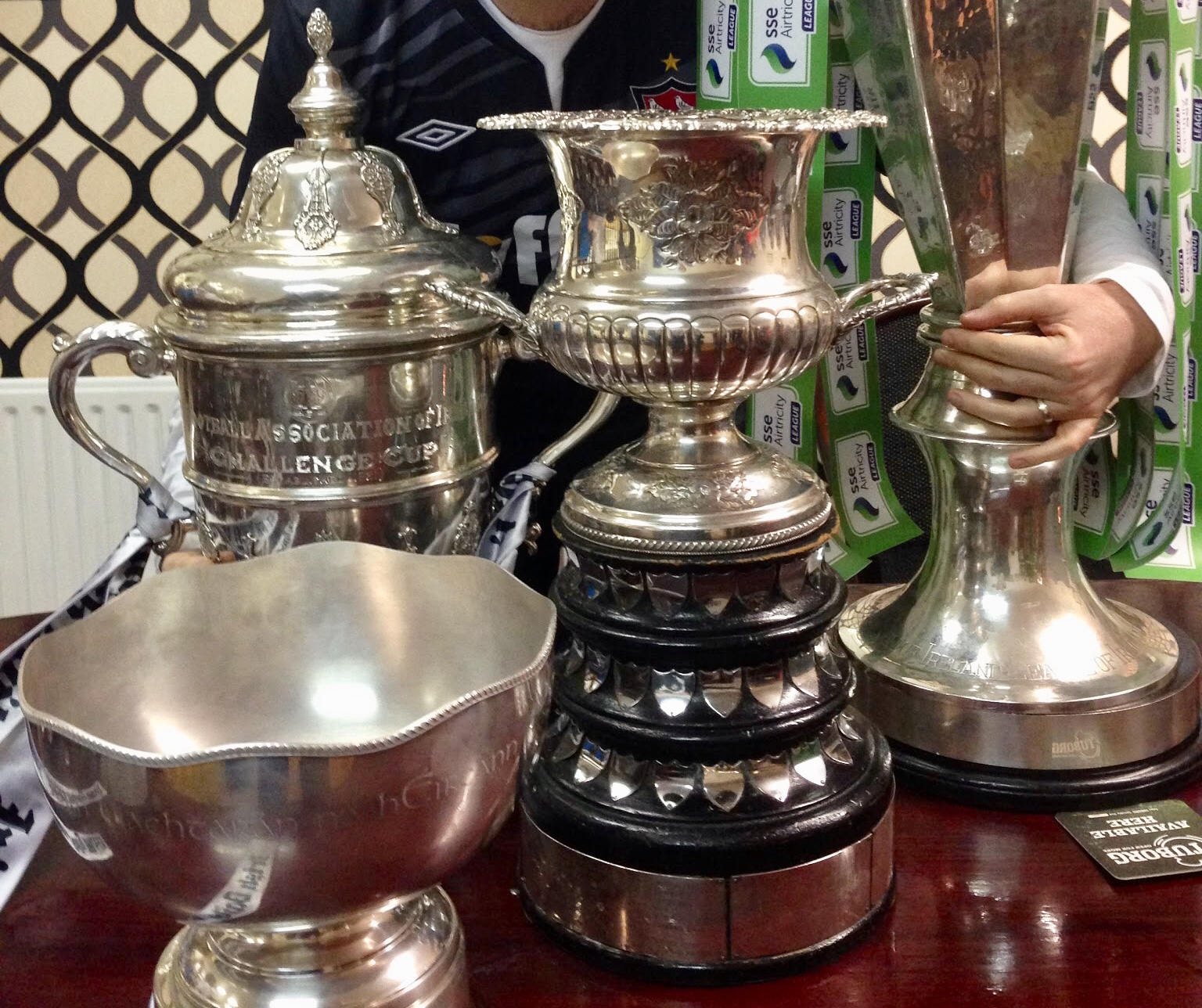
- President's Cup, FAI Cup, Leinster Senior Cup & League of Ireland Champions trophy on display in Oriel Park in 2015

Dundalk Football Club is a professional association football club in Dundalk, Ireland. Dundalk compete in the League of Ireland. They became the first club from outside Dublin to win the league title in 1932–33 and they won the FAI Cup for the first time in 1941–42. They won their most recent league title in 2019 and their most recent FAI Cup in 2020. They are the second most successful club in the League's history (with 14 league titles and 12 FAI Cups).

This list encompasses the major honours won by Dundalk, and the awards won by the club's players and managers. It also includes records set by the club and its players, and milestones the club has reached in its competitive history.

All statistics are accurate as of the end of the 2026 season.

== Background ==
=== Current competitions ===
The League of Ireland was founded as a single-division 'A Championship' in 1921–22. It has comprised a Premier Division and First Division since the 1985–86 season. The winners of the Premier Division are the 'League Champions' and enter the qualification streams of the UEFA Champions League. The League runners-up and third place teams enter the qualification streams of the UEFA Europa Conference League.

The FAI Cup is a knock-out competition contested annually by clubs affiliated with the Football Association of Ireland, including non-League clubs. It was first run in the 1921–22 season. The winners of the FAI Cup are the 'Cup holders' and enter the qualification streams of the UEFA Europa League.

Note: In the event of the winner of the FAI Cup also winning the League in the same season, the Europa League qualifying place goes to the second place team in the League and a Europa Conference League qualifying place goes to the team placed fourth in the League. In the event of the winner of the FAI Cup also finishing second or third in the League in the same season, a Europa Conference League qualifying place goes to the team placed fourth in the League.

The Leinster Senior Cup is a knock-out competition contested annually by clubs affiliated with the Leinster Football Association. It was first run in 1892–93 and is the oldest football cup competition in Ireland. It has been reduced in status over the years and was abandoned during the 2000–01 season, and not revived until 2010. It was again abandoned during the 2019–20 season because of the COVID-19 pandemic and revived in 2022–23.

The President of Ireland's Cup is contested as a pre-season super cup between the winners of the previous season's League of Ireland Premier Division and the FAI Cup. It is organised by the FAI and was first run in 2014, replacing a similarly named tournament, the LFA President's Cup.

=== Discontinued and junior competitions ===
The League of Ireland Cup was first run in the 1973–74 season to replace the League of Ireland Shield and the Dublin City Cup. It had a number of formats but was mostly a knock-out competition contested annually by League clubs and invited non-League clubs. As there was no European qualification for winners of the League Cup, it had a lower status than the FAI Cup and was therefore seen as the third most important trophy in the playing season. It was cancelled during the COVID-19 pandemic, and has not been resumed as of 2025.

The League of Ireland Shield was introduced when the League of Ireland started in 1921 and ran until the 1972–73 season. It was played in a variety of formats and was seen as the third most important trophy after the League and FAI Cup. The winners of the Shield gained entry to the following season's Inter-Cities Fairs Cup until that competition became defunct after 1970–71.

The Dublin City Cup ran from 1934–35 to 1972–73 (with two subsequent attempts to revive the competition). It was contested annually by all League clubs (not just those from Dublin) and had various formats in its history. It was seen as the fourth most important trophy in the playing season.

The Top Four Cup was a super cup, which featured the clubs that finished in the four top positions in the League of Ireland, and was played at the end of the season. It ran between 1955–56 and 1973–74. The competition was sponsored by the Irish Independent newspaper, and as a result was also known as the "Independent Cup".

The Champions Cup (known as the Unite the Union Champions Cup for sponsorship purposes) was a cross-border association football competition played for in 2019 in which the League of Ireland Premier Division champions from the Republic of Ireland faced the NIFL Premiership champions from Northern Ireland. The Champions Cup was the successor to the Setanta Sports Cup.

The Setanta Sports Cup ran from 2005 to 2014. It was a knock-out competition, contested annually by clubs from each of the two jurisdictions in Ireland represented by the FAI and the IFA. It was the sixth cross border tournament following the Inter-City Cup, the North-South Cup (1961–62 to 1962–63), the Blaxnit Cup (1967–68 to 1973–74), the Texaco Cup (1973–74 to 1974–75), and the Tyler Cup (1978–1980). It was sponsored by the subscription television network, Setanta Sports.

The Dublin and Belfast Inter-City Cup ran from 1941–42 to 1948–49. It was a knock-out competition, contested annually by six clubs from each of the two jurisdictions in Ireland represented by the FAI and the Irish Football Association (IFA). It was the first official cross-border football tournament following the North/South split within the IFA in 1921.

The LFA President's Cup was a cup competition featuring League clubs affiliated to the Leinster Football Association. It was played for between 1930 and 2002. It was a de facto national super cup and on 24 occasions featured the League of Ireland champions against the FAI Cup winners. Since 2014, the FAI has organised their own similarly named super cup, the President's Cup.

The P.J. Casey Cup was a single-season competition run in 1962–63 to replace matches lost due to the reduction in teams that season. It ran as a two group, single match round-robin with the top two in each group then playing off in a semi-final and final. The competition was named in memory of P.J. Casey - a long time Honorary Treasurer of the League, and former committee member at Dundalk, who had died in late 1961. Drumcondra defeated Dundalk in the final.

The Leinster Junior Cup is a knock-out competition contested annually by junior clubs affiliated with the Leinster Football Association. It was first run in 1898–99. Dundalk G.N.R. were eligible to compete in the competition until they joined the Leinster Senior League in 1922–23.

The Dundalk and District League is a junior football league for the Dundalk district, which was first formed in 1905–06 then was re-established in 1919–20. The winners of the league are awarded the Macardle Cup, the trophy being originally sponsored by the Macardle Moore Brewery. Dundalk G.N.R. competed in the Dundalk and District League, before being promoted to the Leinster Senior League in 1922–23.

== Honours ==
Competition	Winners	Seasons	Runners-up	Seasons
National competitions
League of Ireland / Premier Division	14	1932–33, 1962–63, 1966–67, 1975–76, 1978–79, 1981–82, 1987–88, 1990–91, 1994–95, 2014, 2015, 2016, 2018, 2019	12	1930-31, 1936-37, 1942-43, 1947-48, 1963-64, 1967-68, 1979-80, 1980-81, 1986-87, 1988-89, 2013, 2017
FAI Cup	12	1941–42, 1948–49, 1951–52, 1957–58, 1976–77, 1978–79, 1980–81, 1987–88, 2001–02, 2015, 2018, 2020	8	1930–31, 1934–35, 1937–38, 1986–87, 1992–93, 2016, 2017, 2019
League of Ireland First Division	3	2000–01, 2008, 2025	1	2006
President of Ireland's Cup	3	2015, 2019, 2021	3	2016, 2017, 2018
League Cup (discontinued)	7	1977–78, 1980–81, 1986–87, 1989–90, 2014, 2017, 2019	4	1982–83, 1985–86, 1988–89, 1994–95
League of Ireland Shield (discontinued)	2	1966–67, 1971–72	6	1932–33, 1941–42, 1946–47, 1963–64, 1967–68, 1968–69
Dublin City Cup (discontinued)	5	1937–38, 1942–43, 1948–49, 1967–68, 1968–69	8	1935–36, 1936–37, 1940–41, 1947–48, 1965–66, 1966–67, 1970–71, 1983–84
Top Four Cup (discontinued)	2	1963–64, 1966–67	0	
TOTAL	48		42	
All-Ireland, Leinster, and Junior competitions
Champions Cup (discontinued)	1	2019	0	
Dublin and Belfast Inter-City Cup (discontinued)	1	1941–42	1	1948–49
Setanta Sports Cup (discontinued)	0		2	2011, 2014
Leinster Senior Cup	8	1950–51, 1960–61, 1970–71, 1973–74, 1976–77, 1977–78, 2014–15, 2024–25	13	1928–29, 1934–35, 1935–36, 1936–37, 1938–39, 1958–59, 1961–62, 1964–65, 1966–67, 1981–82, 1993–94, 1994–95, 2016–17
LFA President's Cup (discontinued)	9	1930–31, 1951–52, 1963–64, 1964–65, 1979–80, 1980–81, 1981–82, 1988–89, 1989–90	14	1932–33, 1943–44, 1949–50, 1952–53, 1958–59, 1968–69, 1972–73, 1976–77, 1977–78, 1982–83, 1986–87, 1987–88, 1995–96, 2002–03,
Leinster Junior Cup	0		1	1919–20
Dundalk and District League	2	1919–20, 1920–21	1	1921–22
TOTAL	21		32	

=== Doubles ===
- League and FAI Cup: 4
  - 1978–79, 1987–88, 2015 (Note: 'Treble' winning season including Leinster Senior Cup), 2018
- League and League Cup: 2
  - 2014, 2019 (Note: 'Treble' winning season including Unite the Union Champions Cup)
- League and Shield: 1
  - 1966–67 (Note: 'Treble' winning season including Top Four Cup)
- Trophy Doubles: 6
  - 1941–42 (FAI Cup and Dublin and Belfast Inter-City Cup)
  - 1948–49 (FAI Cup and Dublin City Cup)
  - 1976–77 (FAI Cup and Leinster Senior Cup)
  - 1977–78 (League of Ireland Cup and Leinster Senior Cup)
  - 1980–81 (FAI Cup and League Cup)
  - 2025 (League of Ireland First Division and Leinster Senior Cup)

== Team and individual awards ==
- FIFA Puskás Award (nomination): 1
  - 2020 (Jordan Flores)
- RTÉ Sports Team of the Year Award (all sports): 1
  - 2015
- Philips Sports Manager of the Year (all sports): 1
  - 2016 (Stephen Kenny)
- SWAI Personality of the Year: 9
  - 1979 (Jim McLaughlin), 1982 (Tommy McConville), 1988 (Terry Eviston), 1991 (Peter Hanrahan), 2014 (Stephen Kenny), 2015 (Richie Towell), 2016 (Stephen Kenny), 2018 (Stephen Kenny), 2019 (Vinny Perth)
- SWAI Goalkeeper of the Year: 2
  - 2015 (Gary Rogers), 2019 (Gary Rogers)
- PFAI Players' Player of the Year: 4
  - 2015 (Richie Towell), 2016 (Daryl Horgan), 2018 (Michael Duffy), 2026 (Daryl Horgan)
- PFAI Players' Young Player of the Year: 5
  - 1990 (Tony Cousins), 1993 (Richie Purdy), 2013 (Richie Towell), 2014 (Daryl Horgan), 2018 (Jamie McGrath)
- PFAI Players' First Division Player of the Year: 2
  - 2006 (Philip Hughes), 2008 (David Cassidy)
- PFAI Players' Manager of the Year: 6
  - 2013–16 (Stephen Kenny), 2018 (Stephen Kenny), 2019 (Vinny Perth)
- PFAI Players' First Division Manager of the Year: 1
  - 2025 (Ciarán Kilduff)
- FAI League of Ireland Player of the Year: 3
  - 2015 (Richie Towell), 2016 (Daryl Horgan), 2018 (Chris Shields)
- FAI Special Merit Award: 1
  - 2016 (Dundalk)
- Fair Play League: 3
  - 2005 (First Division); 2014, 2016 (Premier Division)
- League Top Scorer: 9
  - 1928–29 (17, Eddie Carroll); 1963–64 (18, Jimmy Hasty); 1966–67 (18, Danny Hale); 1967–68 (15, Ben Hannigan); 1990–91 (18, Peter Hanrahan); 2014 (20, Patrick Hoban); 2015 (25, Richie Towell); 2018 (29, Patrick Hoban); 2020 (10, Patrick Hoban)
- First Division Top Scorer: 1
  - 2006 (21, Philip Hughes)

=== Player of the Month ===
The League of Ireland Player of the Month is selected by the Soccer Writers' Association of Ireland (SWAI).

Season	Month	Nationality	Player	Position
1975–76	March	Northern Ireland	Seamus McDowell	MF
1976–77	March	Ireland	Mick Lawlor	FW
1978–79	September	Ireland	Dermot Keely	DF
1978–79	March	Ireland	Paddy Dunning	DF
1978–79	April	New Zealand	Sean Byrne	MF
1979–80	October	Ireland	Dermot Keely	DF
1979–80	February	England	Richie Blackmore	GK
1980–81	October	Ireland	Mick Fairclough	MF
1981–82	September	Ireland	Barry Kehoe	MF
1981–82	April	Ireland	Tommy McConville	DF
1982–83	October	Ireland	Leo Flanagan	MF
1985–86	December	Ireland	Joey Malone	DF
1986–87	November	Ireland	Barry Kehoe	MF
1987–88	March	Ireland	Terry Eviston	FW
1987–88	April	Ireland	Dessie Gorman	FW
1988–89	January	Ireland	Larry Wyse	MF
1990–91	October	Ireland	Peter Hanrahan	FW
1990–91	April	Scotland	Tom McNulty	MF
1997–98	October	Ireland	Brian Byrne	MF
2011	March	Ireland	Mark Quigley	FW
2013	July	Ireland	Patrick Hoban	FW
2013	August	Ireland	Richie Towell	MF
2014	May	Ireland	Daryl Horgan	MF
2014	July	Ireland	Richie Towell	MF
2014	September	Ireland	Dane Massey	DF
2014	October	Ireland	Patrick Hoban	FW
2015	March	Ireland	David McMillan	FW
2015	April	Ireland	Richie Towell	MF
2015	May	Ireland	Daryl Horgan	MF
2015	September	Ireland	Richie Towell	MF
2015	November	Ireland	Richie Towell	MF
2016	April	Ireland	Ronan Finn	MF
2016	May	Ireland	Daryl Horgan	MF
2016	July	Ireland	David McMillan	FW
2016	August	Ireland	Robbie Benson	MF
2016	September	Ireland	Daryl Horgan	MF
2016	October	Ireland	Chris Shields	MF
2017	June	Ireland	Patrick McEleney	MF
2018	April	Ireland	Michael Duffy	MF
2018	May	Ireland	Seán Hoare	DF
2018	June	Ireland	Patrick Hoban	FW
2018	August	Ireland	Michael Duffy	MF
2018	September	Ireland	Chris Shields	MF
2018	October	Ireland	Patrick McEleney	MF
2019	May	Ireland	Sean Gannon	DF
2019	August	Ireland	Daniel Cleary	DF
2019	September	Ireland	Michael Duffy	MF
2020	October	Ireland	Sean Murray	MF
2020	November	Ireland	David McMillan	FW
2022	February	Scotland	Steven Bradley	MF
2022	May	Ireland	Daniel Kelly	MF
2022	June	Ireland	Mark Connolly	DF
2023	June	Ireland	Patrick Hoban	FW
2026	May	Ireland	Daryl Horgan	FW
2026	June	Northern Ireland	Eoin Kenny	FW

== European record ==
As of 3 August 2023.

Competition	Pld	W	D	L	GF	GA
European Cup / UEFA Champions League	33	4	12	17	24	60
UEFA Cup / UEFA Europa League	37	9	5	23	34	73
UEFA Europa Conference League	10	4	4	2	18	13
European Cup Winners' Cup / UEFA Cup Winners' Cup	8	2	1	5	7	14
Inter-Cities Fairs Cup	6	1	1	4	4	25
TOTAL	94	20	23	51	87	185

== Domestic records held by the club ==
- Most points in a League season: (87, in 2018)
- Most goals scored in a League season: (85, in 2018)
- Largest Goal Difference in a League season: (+65, in 2018)
- Fewest defeats in a 30+ match League season: (1, 2015) (Note: The only three unbeaten League seasons - 1924–25, 1926–27, 2020 - were played over 18 matches)
- Most League and League Cup Doubles: (2—joint record)
- Most ties won in a single Europa League campaign: (3, in the 2020–21 UEFA Europa League)
- Most points won in the group stage of the Europa League: (4, in the 2016–17 Europa League)
- Most goals scored in an FAI Cup campaign: (22, in 2020)
- Most consecutive FAI Cup final appearances: (6—joint record, 2015–2020)
- Record FAI Cup tie victory: (11–0 v Athlone Town, 2020) (Note: This is also a joint record domestic victory in all competitions)
- Most goalscorers in a single match: (9, v Athlone Town, 2020)
- Most 'Player of the Month' awards in a single season: (6, 2016, 2018)

== Club records ==
=== Medal winning records – players ===
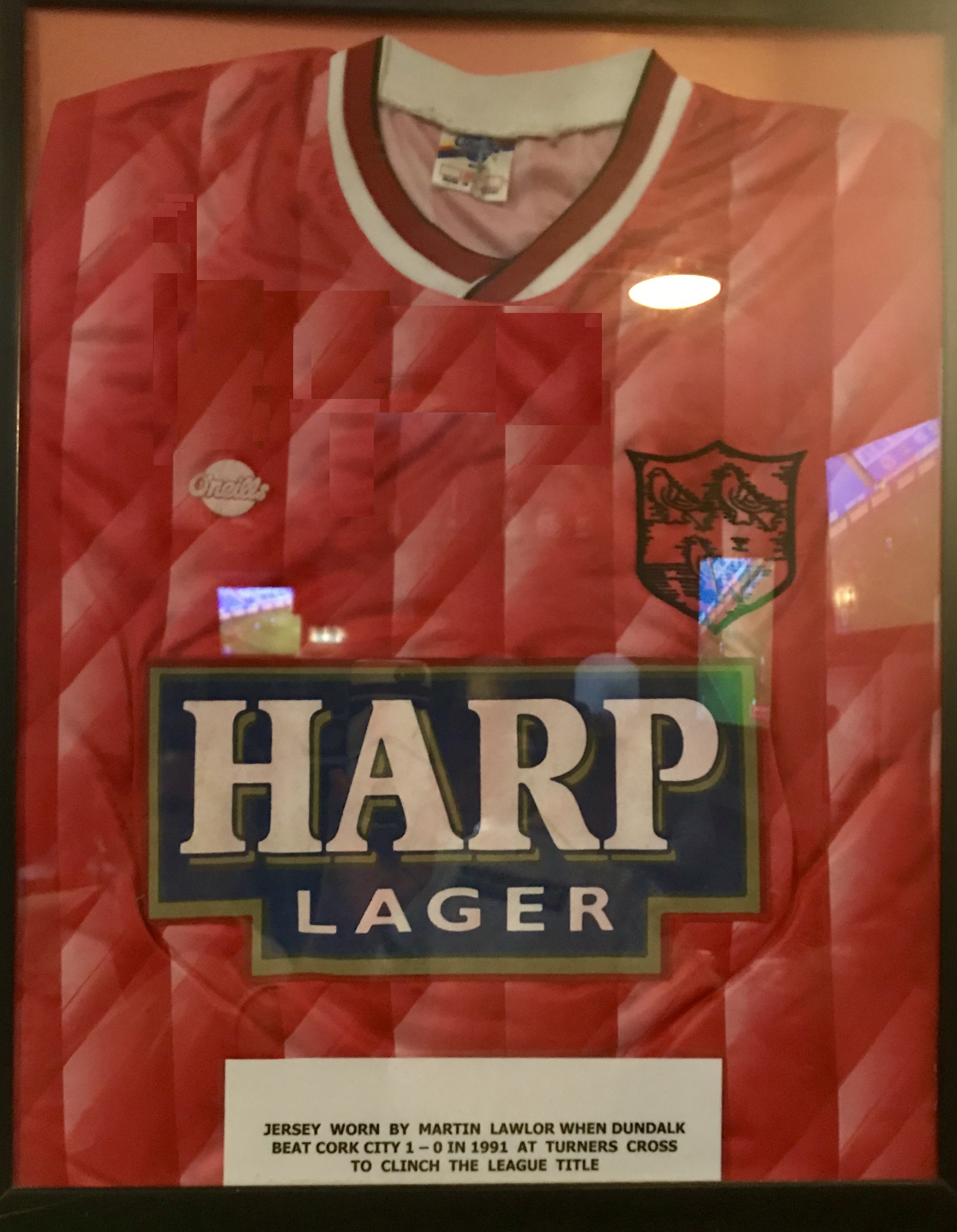
Martin Lawlor's match-worn shirt in which he won his fourth League medal in 1991

No.	Name	Years	League	FAI Cup	League Cup	Shield	Dublin City Cup	Others^{a}	Total
1	(Republic of Ireland) Chris Shields	2012–2021	5	3	3	0	0	5	16
2	(Republic of Ireland) Martin Lawlor	1977–1995	5	3	3	0	0	4	15
3	(Republic of Ireland) John Mountney	2012–2024	5	3	3	0	0	4	15
4	(Republic of Ireland) Brian Gartland	2013–2022	5	3	3	0	0	3	14
5	(Republic of Ireland) Dane Massey	2013–2020	5	3	3	0	0	3	14
6	(Republic of Ireland) Sean Gannon	2014–2020	5	3	3	0	0	3	14
7	(Republic of Ireland) Tommy McConville	1964–1986	3	3	2	1	2	6	17
8	(England) Richie Blackmore	1974–1985	3	3	2	0	0	5	13
9	(Republic of Ireland) Paddy Turner	1965–1972	1	0	0	2	2	2	7
10	(Republic of Ireland) Fran Brennan	1966–1973	1	0	0	2	2	2	7
11	(Republic of Ireland) Kevin Murray	1966–1971	1	0	0	1	2	1	5
12	(Republic of Ireland) Joey Donnelly	1929–1947	0	1	0	0	2	2	5
13	(Republic of Ireland) Billy O'Neill	1934–1944	0	1	0	0	2	1	4

a. Includes the Top Four Cup, Leinster Senior Cup, Dublin and Belfast Intercity Cup, Champions Cup (All-Ireland), President of Ireland's Cup, and LFA President's Cup.

=== Honours – managers ===
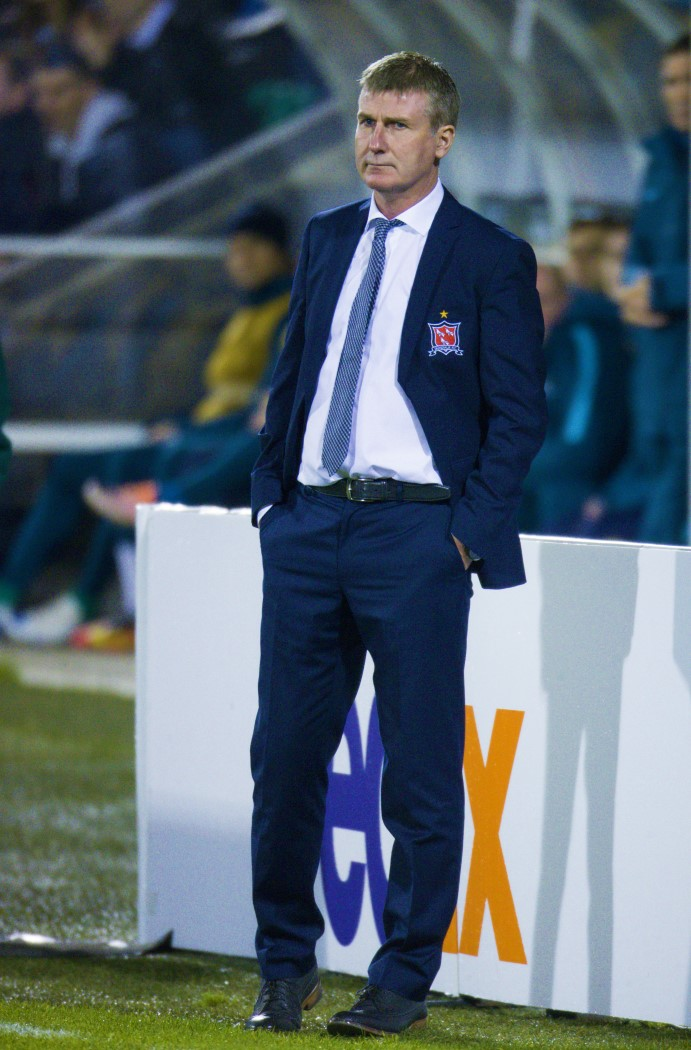
Stephen Kenny, manager 2013–2018.

Honours won during years when the club had a management committee and not a first team manager (1934–1965) not included

No.	Name	Years	League	FAI Cup	League Cup	Shield	Others^{a}	Total
1	(Republic of Ireland) Stephen Kenny	2013–2018	4	2	2	0	2	10
2	(Northern Ireland) Jim McLaughlin	1974–1983	3	3	2	0	5	13
3	(Republic of Ireland) Turlough O'Connor	1985–1993	2	1	2	0	2	7
4	(Wales) Alan Fox	1966–1968	1	0	0	1	2	4
5	(Republic of Ireland) Vinny Perth	2019–2020	1	0	1	0	2	4
6	(England) Steve Wright	1930–1934	1	0	0	0	1	2
7	(Republic of Ireland) Dermot Keely	1993–1996	1	0	0	0	0	1
8	(Republic of Ireland) Martin Murray	2000–2002	0	1	0	0	1	2
9	(Italy) Filippo Giovagnoli	2020–2021	0	1	0	0	1	2
10	(Republic of Ireland) Liam Tuohy	1969–1972	0	0	0	1	1	2
11	(Republic of Ireland) Ciarán Kilduff	2025–	0	0	0	0	2	2

a. Includes the Dublin City Cup, Top Four Cup, First Division Championship, President of Ireland's Cup, Dublin and Belfast Intercity Cup, Champions Cup (All-Ireland), Leinster Senior Cup, and LFA President's Cup.

=== Appearance records ===
Competitive matches only, includes appearances as substitute. Years do not include breaks in service.

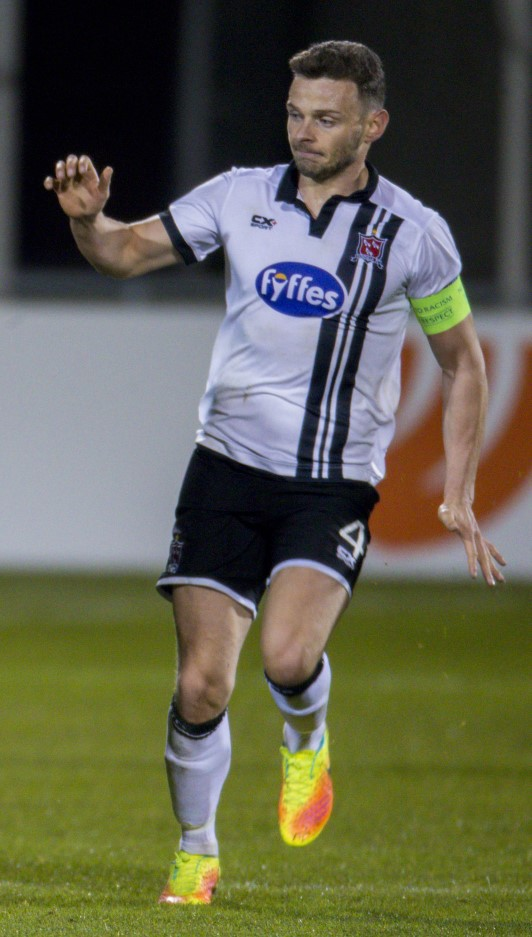
Dundalk's leading appearance maker in Europe, Andy Boyle, in action in the 2016–17 Europa League.

No.	Name	Years	League	FAI Cup	League Cup	Shield	Dublin City Cup	Europe	Other^{a}	Total
1	(Republic of Ireland) Tommy McConville	1964–1986	387	49	41	24	15	19	45	580
2	(Republic of Ireland) Martin Lawlor	1977–1995	400	56	56	0	0	18	40	570
3	(Republic of Ireland) Joey Donnelly	1929–1947	238	52	0	129	44	0	56	519
4	(Scotland) Tom McNulty	1984–2000	371	35	48	0	0	5	17	476
5	(England) Richie Blackmore	1974–1985	292	34	32	0	0	18	31	407
6	(Republic of Ireland) Leo McDonagh	1950–1962	221	30	0	94	17	0	21	383
7	(England) Henry Hurst	1930–1941	173	27	0	104	18	0	31	353
8	(Republic of Ireland) Chris Shields	2012–2021	250	37	11	0	0	36	15	349
9	(Republic of Ireland) John Mountney	2012–2024	238	36	20	0	0	33	21	348
10	(Republic of Ireland) Andy Boyle	2013–2024	260	27	5	0	0	41	14	347
12	(Republic of Ireland) Billy O'Neill	1934–1944	154	32	0	86	28	0	30	330

a. Includes the Top Four Cup, Leinster Senior Cup, Dublin and Belfast Intercity Cup, Setanta Sports Cup, Champions Cup (All-Ireland), President of Ireland's Cup, and LFA President's Cup.

=== Goalscoring records ===
Totals during club career. Years do not include breaks in service. Competitive matches only.

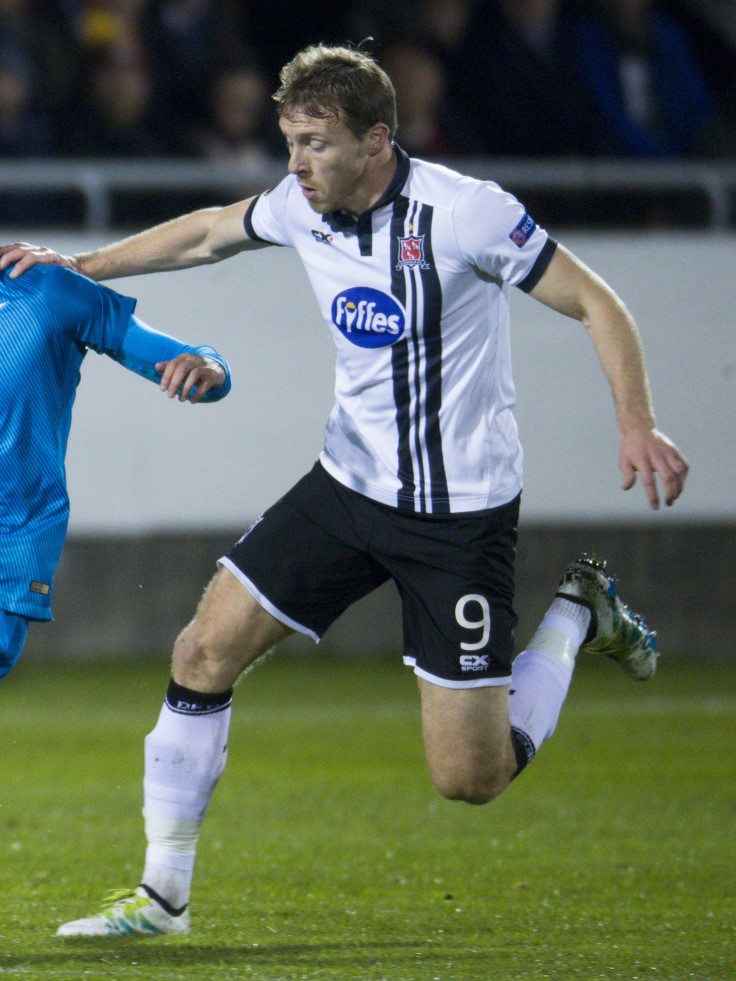
Dundalk's leading goalscorer in Europe, David McMillan, in action in the 2016–17 Europa League.

No.	Name	Years	League	FAI Cup	League Cup	Shield	Dublin City Cup	Europe	Other^{a}	Total
1	(Republic of Ireland) Patrick Hoban	2013–2023	121	14	5	0	0	6	4	150
2	(Republic of Ireland) Joey Donnelly	1929–1947	69	14	0	35	8	0	16	142
3	(Northern Ireland) Eddie Carroll	1927–1935	47	9	0	41	0	0	16	113
4	(Republic of Ireland) Joe Martin	1949–1960	58	8	0	31	8	0	4	109
5	(Republic of Ireland) Paddy Turner	1965–1972	54	5	0	27	9	0	9	104
6	(Northern Ireland) Jimmy Hasty	1960–1966	59	5	0	17	3	1	18	103
7	(Republic of Ireland) Francie Callan	1954–1967	42	3	0	34	7	0	10	96
8	(Republic of Ireland) David McMillan	2014–2022	57	15	6	0	0	13	3	94
9	(Republic of Ireland) Peadar Walsh	1946–1949	20	1	0	19	26	0	5	71
10	(Republic of Ireland) Brian Byrne	1994–1998	22	5	11	0	0	0	1	39

a. Includes the Top Four Cup, Leinster Senior Cup, Dublin and Belfast Intercity Cup, Setanta Sports Cup, Champions Cup (All-Ireland), President of Ireland's Cup, and LFA President's Cup.

Single season

- All competitions: 43, Joe Sayers, 1935–36
- League: 29, Patrick Hoban, 2018
- FAI Cup: 8, David McMillan, 2020
- League Cup: 6, Warren Patmore, 1994–95
- Shield: 19, Joe Sayers, 1935–36
- Dublin City Cup: 11, Peadar Walsh, 1948–49
- European competition: 5, David McMillan, 2016–17

Single match

- Shield: 5, Joe Sayers v Bohemians, 1935–36
- Dublin City Cup: 5, Peadar Walsh v Waterford, 1947–48; Peadar Walsh v Waterford, 1948–49
- FAI Cup: 4, Eddie Carroll v Bray Unknowns, 1928–29
- League Cup: 4, Warren Patmore v Longford Town, 1994–95; Patrick Hoban v Bohemians, 2019

=== Match records ===
- Highest Home attendance:
  - 30,417 v Legia Warsaw, 2016 (Aviva Stadium, Dublin).
  - 18,000 (Note: figures of 17,000 to 21,000 have been quoted for the European Cup tie against Celtic F.C. in 1979. However, due to the practice of recording 'gates' in monetary terms, the exact number in attendance at that match is unknown—as children and pensioners were charged lower prices or let in for free.) v Tottenham Hotspur, 1981 (Oriel Park, Dundalk).
- Record victory:
  - 11–0 v Athlone Town, 2020 FAI Cup (away)
- Record League victory:
  - 9–0 v Jacobs, 1932 (home)
  - 9–0 v Shelbourne, 1980 (home)
- Record League defeat:
  - 1–9 v Limerick, 1944 (away)
- Record European victory:
  - 4–0 v Fram, 1981 (home)
  - 4–0 v Newtown, 2021 (home)
- Record European defeat:
  - 0-10 v Liverpool, 1969 (away)
- Most points in a League season:
  - 87 in 36 games (2.42 per game), 2018
- Best offensive League season:
  - 64 goals scored in 22 games (2.91 per game), 1930–31
  - 85 goals scored in 36 games (2.36 per game), 2018
- Best defensive League season:
  - 13 goals conceded in 30 games (0.43 per game), 1979–80
- Biggest Goal Difference in a League season:
  - +65, 2018
- Record League sequences:
  - Consecutive wins: 13, 2018
  - Consecutive losses: 11, 1998–99 (last eight games) and 1999–00 (first three games)
  - Consecutive draws: 10, 2005
  - Longest undefeated run: 24 games, 2019
  - Longest run of clean sheets: 8 games, 2018
  - Longest run without a win: 19 games, 2002–03 (10 games) through 2003 (nine games)

== Club milestones ==
- Landmark firsts
  - 12 December 1903: Dundalk G.N.R. A.F.C. first recorded match (v Dundalk Wanderers, Fairgreen Dundalk)
  - 10 February 1906: First match in Dundalk and District League (v St. Nicholas's, Polo Field, Dundalk)
  - 6 September 1919: First match for re-constituted Dundalk G.N.R. – in Newry and District League (v Newry United)
  - 7 October 1922: First match in Leinster Senior League (away v Inchicore United)
  - 21 August 1926: First match in Free State League (away v Fordsons)
  - 21 August 1926: First goal in Free State League (Joey Quinn v Fordsons)
  - 19 September 1926: First win in Free State League (home v Jacobs)
  - 20 April 1929: First Dundalk player capped for Ireland (Bob Egan v Belgium, Dalymount Park)
  - 18 April 1931: First FAI Cup Final (v Shamrock Rovers, Dalymount Park)
  - 9 September 1931: First Trophy (President's Cup v Shamrock Rovers, Dalymount Park)
  - 23 August 1936: First match in Oriel Park (v Cork F.C.)
  - 26 April 1942: First FAI Cup Final win (v Cork United, Dalymount Park)
  - 26 December 1950: First Leinster Senior Cup Final win (v St Patrick's Athletic, Dalymount Park)
  - 11 September 1963: First match in Europe (v FC Zurich in Dalymount Park)
  - 25 September 1963: First victory in Europe (away v FC Zurich)
  - 20 September 1967: First European match, and first match under lights in Oriel Park (v Vasas SC)
  - 12 April 1978: First League Cup Final win (v Cork Alberts, Flower Lodge)
  - 22 April 1979: First League & Cup Double
  - 15 August 1999: First match in League of Ireland First Division
  - 25 August 2005: First match on artificial surface in Oriel Park (v Drogheda United FAI Cup)
  - 15 September 2016: First match in group stage of European competition (away v AZ Alkmaar)
- Landmark matches & goals
  - 27 September 1931: 100th League match (away v Cork F.C.)
  - 27 December 1937: 100th League victory (v Drumcondra)
  - 9 March 1952: 1000th goal scored in League of Ireland (Paddy Mullen v Waterford)
  - 29 March 1953: 500th match in League of Ireland (home v Waterford)
  - 2 February 1975: 1,000th match in League of Ireland (away v Cork Celtic)
  - 2 January 1977: 2,000th goal scored in League of Ireland (Jackie McManus v Sligo Rovers)
  - 11 January 1981: 500th League victory (v Thurles Town)
  - 5 April 1992: 1,500th match in League of Ireland (home v Shelbourne)
  - 18 September 2001: 3,000th goal scored in top flight of League of Ireland (Ger Robinson v Bohemians) (Note: Excludes goals in play-off matches)
  - 8 March 2007: 2,000th match in League of Ireland (v Finn Harps) (Note: Includes Promotion/relegation play-off matches)
  - 8 March 2007: 100th victory in League of Ireland First Division (v Finn Harps) (Note: Excludes Promotion/relegation play-off matches)
  - 22 July 2015: 50th match in European competition (home v BATE Borisov)
  - 9 April 2016: 1,000th goal scored in League of Ireland Premier Division (Brian Gartland v Longford Town) (Note: Excludes goals in play-off matches)
  - 21 August 2026: 100th anniversary of first match in the League of Ireland (home v Galway United)
  - (as of the end of the 2026 season Dundalk have played 2,336 matches, won 1,042 and scored 3,962 goals in the top-flight of the League of Ireland) (Note: Excludes Promotion/relegation play-off matches) (Note: Results v Monaghan United in 2012 expunged)

== Internationals ==
Dundalk Football Club players capped for Republic of Ireland while at the club

- (Republic of Ireland) Bob Egan (1 cap)
- (Republic of Ireland) Joey Donnelly (10 caps)
- (Republic of Ireland) Billy O'Neill (11 caps)
- (Republic of Ireland) Mick Hoy (6 caps)
- (Republic of Ireland) Dicky Lunn (2 caps)
- (Republic of Ireland) Terry Murray (1 cap)
- (Republic of Ireland) Tony O'Connell (1 cap)
- (Republic of Ireland) Tommy McConville (1 cap)
- (Republic of Ireland) Turlough O'Connor (5 caps)
- (Republic of Ireland) Synan Braddish (2 caps)
- (Republic of Ireland) Mick Fairclough (2 caps)

Players receiving full international caps for other countries while at the club

- (Latvia) Raivis Jurkovskis (13 caps)
- (Faroe Islands) Sonni Nattestad (9 caps)
- (Central African Republic) Wilfried Zahibo (2 caps)
- (Gibraltar) Louie Annesley (8 caps)
- (Sri Lanka) Sam Durrant (4 caps)

Players receiving full international caps after leaving the club

- (Republic of Ireland) Peter Corr
- (Republic of Ireland) Tommy Clinton
- (Republic of Ireland) Jim Hartnett
- (Republic of Ireland) Jimmy Higgins
- (Republic of Ireland) Fred Kiernan
- (Republic of Ireland) Tommy Traynor
- (Republic of Ireland) Eoin Hand
- (Republic of Ireland) Steve Staunton
- (Republic of Ireland) Daryl Horgan
- (Republic of Ireland) Andy Boyle
- (Republic of Ireland) Sean Maguire
- (Republic of Ireland) Shaun Williams
- (Republic of Ireland) Jamie McGrath
- (Northern Ireland) Bob Thompson
- (Northern Ireland) Bertie Fulton
- (Northern Ireland) William Pollock
- (Northern Ireland) Hugh Blair
- (Northern Ireland) Bill Gowdy
- (Northern Ireland) Billy Mitchell
- (Northern Ireland) Jackie Coulter
- (Northern Ireland) Frank McCourt
- (Northern Ireland) Seamus D'Arcy
- (Northern Ireland) Peter McParland
- (United States) Kenny Finn
- (United States) Bobby Smith
- (United States) David D'Errico
- (Australia) John Coyne
- (New Zealand) Tom McCabe
- (New Zealand) Sean Byrne
- (New Zealand) Billy Wright
- (Zambia) Harry McQuillan
- (Equatorial Guinea) Baba Issaka
- (Jamaica) Michael Hector
- (Lithuania) Karolis Chvedukas
