= 2015 Dundalk F.C. season =

Dundalk
2015 season
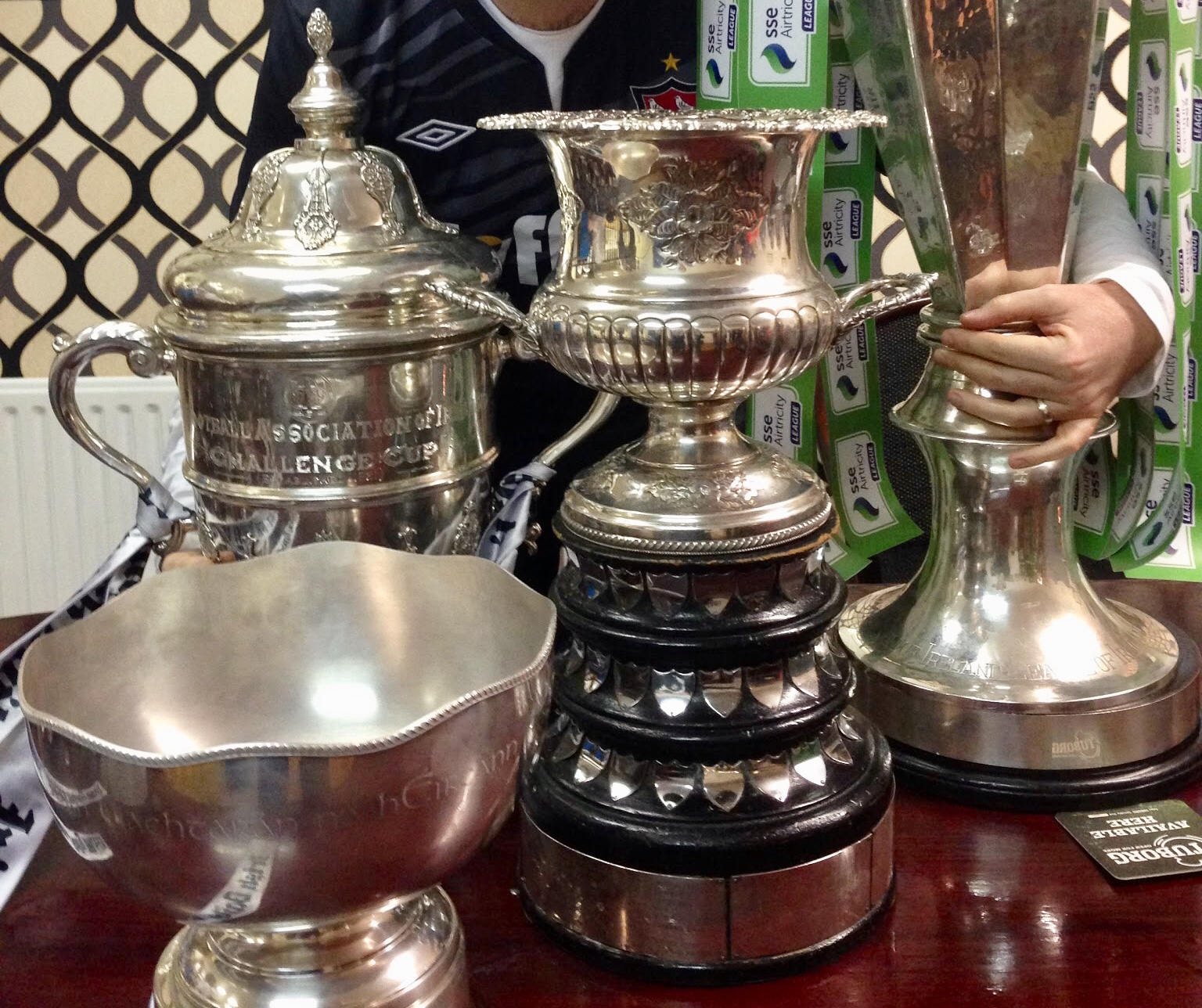
- President’s Cup, FAI Cup, Leinster Senior Cup & League of Ireland Champions trophy on display in Oriel Park in 2015
- Manager: Stephen Kenny
- Premier Division: 1st (champions)
- FAI Cup: Winners
- League Cup: Semi-final
- President's Cup: Winners
- Leinster Senior Cup: Winners
- Champions League: 2Q
- Top goalscorer: League: Richie Towell (25); All: Richie Towell (26)
- Highest home attendance: 3,957 (vs. Shamrock Rovers, 1 September 2015)
Home colours	Away colours

Dundalk entered the 2015 season as the reigning League Champions from 2014, having won the title for the first time since 1995, and were also the League Cup holders. 2015 was Stephen Kenny's third season at the club as manager. It was Dundalk's seventh consecutive season in the top tier of Irish football, their 80th in all, and their 89th in the League of Ireland.

== Season summary ==
The new season's curtain raiser - the President's Cup - was played on 28 February in Oriel Park between Dundalk and St Patrick's Athletic - the winners of the FAI Cup the previous year. Dundalk won on a 2-1 scoreline - their first success in the competition. The 33 round League programme commenced on 6 March 2015, and was completed on 30 October 2015. Dundalk retained the title for the first time in their history, sealing it with three games to spare. They subsequently won the 2015 FAI Cup Final with a 1-0 victory over Cork City after extra time. An opportunity to win the club's first domestic Treble was passed up when a largely reserve side lost the League Cup semi-final in a penalty shoot-out. However they also won the Leinster Senior Cup, defeating Shamrock Rovers 3-1 in the final. The trophy haul for the year made the 2015 season the most successful in their history.

In Europe they were knocked out at the first hurdle, losing to BATE Borisov in the Champions League second qualifying round when, after scoring an away goal in a 2-1 defeat, they were unable to score the goal in Oriel Park that would have sent them through to the next round.

=== First-Team Squad (2015) ===
Squad No.	Name	Date of Birth	Position	Debut season	League appearances	Goals
1	(Republic of Ireland) Gary Rogers	25 September 1981	GK	2015	31	0
2	(Republic of Ireland) Sean Gannon	11 July 1991	DF	2014	32	1
3	(Republic of Ireland) Brian Gartland	4 November 1986	DF	2013	27	6
4	(Republic of Ireland) Andy Boyle	7 March 1991	DF	2013	33	1
5	(Republic of Ireland) Chris Shields	27 December 1990	MF	2012	30	0
6	(Republic of Ireland) Stephen O'Donnell	15 January 1986	MF	2013	24	2
7	(Republic of Ireland) Daryl Horgan	10 August 1992	MF	2014	33	9
8	(Republic of Ireland) John Mountney	22 February 1993	MF	2012	33	3
9	(Republic of Ireland) David McMillan	14 December 1988	FW	2014	33	12
10	(Republic of Ireland) Ronan Finn	21 December 1987	MF	2015	33	5
11	(Republic of Ireland) Kurtis Byrne	9 April 1990	FW	2013	14	0
12	(Republic of Ireland) Shane Grimes	9 March 1987	DF	2005	4	0
14	(Republic of Ireland) Dane Massey	17 April 1988	DF	2013	32	4
15	(Republic of Ireland) Paddy Barrett	22 July 1993	DF	2015	11	0
16	(Republic of Ireland) Ciarán Kilduff	29 September 1988	FW	2015	12	4
17	(Republic of Ireland) Richie Towell	17 July 1991	MF	2013	32	25
19	(Republic of Ireland) Sean Maguire	1 May 1994	FW	2015	6	0
21	(Republic of Ireland) Darren Meenan	1 October 1991	MF	2013	28	3
22	(Romania) Gabriel Sava	15 September 1986	GK	2014	3	0
28	(Republic of Ireland) Georgie Poynton	8 September 1997	MF	2013	2	0

== Competitions ==
=== President's Cup ===
28 February 2015	Dundalk	2–1	St Patrick's Athletic	Oriel Park
TBC GMT	Horgan 36' Towell 38'	Report	Forrester 35'	Attendance: 1,800 (estimate); Referee: Tomas Connolly

=== Premier Division ===
Pos	Team	Pld	W	D	L	GF	GA	GD	Pts	Qualification or relegation
1	Dundalk (C)	33	23	9	1	78	23	+55	78	Qualification for Champions League second qualifying round (Note: Dundalk qualified for the Europa League first qualifying round by winning the 2015 FAI Cup. However, since they already qualified for European competition based on their league position, the spot awarded to the cup winners was passed down the league.)
2	Cork City	33	19	10	4	57	25	+32	67	Qualification for Europa League first qualifying round
3	Shamrock Rovers	33	18	11	4	56	27	+29	65	Qualification for Europa League first qualifying round
4	St Patrick's Athletic	33	18	4	11	52	34	+18	58	Qualification for Europa League first qualifying round
5	Bohemians	33	15	8	10	49	42	+7	53	
6	Longford Town	33	10	9	14	41	53	−12	39	
7	Derry City	33	9	8	16	32	42	−10	35	
8	Bray Wanderers	33	9	6	18	27	51	−24	33	
9	Sligo Rovers	33	7	10	16	39	55	−16	31	
10	Galway United	33	9	4	20	39	61	−22	31	
11	Limerick (R)	33	7	8	18	46	73	−27	29	Qualification for relegation play-off
12	Drogheda United (R)	33	7	7	19	32	62	−30	28	Relegation to League of Ireland First Division

Source: League of Ireland, Soccerway
Rules for classification: 1) Points; 2) Goal difference; 3) Goals scored.
(C) Champions; (R) Relegated

=== FAI Cup ===
Second round

29 May	Dundalk	5–0	Shelbourne	Oriel Park
		Report

Third round

21 August	Galway United	1–4	Dundalk	Eamonn Deacy Park
		Report		Attendance: 761; Referee: Robert Rogers

Quarter Final

Dundalk	4–0	Sligo Rovers	Oriel Park
	Report

Semi-final

2 October	Dundalk	2–0	Longford Town	Oriel Park
		Report

Final

8 November 2015	Dundalk	1–0 (a.e.t.)	Cork City	Aviva Stadium
15:30	Richie Towell 107'	Report		Attendance: 25,103; Referee: David McKeon

=== League Cup ===
Second round

7 April 2015	Dundalk	1–0	Shelbourne	Oriel Park
19:45	John Mountney 11'	Report		Attendance: 697; Referee: Rob Harvey

Quarter Final

18 May 2015	UCC	0–5	Dundalk	The Mardyke
20:00		Report	Ciaran O'Connor 3'; Jake Kelly 13'; Paddy Barrett 36'; Paddy Barrett 55'; Kurtis Byrne 78'	Attendance: 650 (Est.); Referee: David Keeler

Semi-final

3 August 2015	Galway United	0–0 (a.e.t.) (4–2 p)	Dundalk	Eamonn Deacy Park
17:00	Alex Byrne (yellow card) 113'	Report	Ronan Finn (yellow card) 44'; Darren Meenan (yellow card) 78'	Referee: Ray Matthews
	Penalties
	Stephen Walsh (penalty scored); David O'Leary (penalty scored); Jake Keegan (penalty scored); Colm Horgan (penalty scored)		Ronan Finn (penalty missed); David McMillan (penalty missed); Daryl Horgan (penalty scored); John Mountney (penalty scored)

=== Leinster Senior Cup ===
Fourth round

10 February 2015	Dundalk	2–1	UCD	Dundalk
19:45 GMT	Ronan Finn 74'; David McMillan 83'	Report	Dylan Watts 15'	Stadium: Oriel Park; Referee: Robert Harvey

Quarter Final

16 March 2015	Wexford	0–3	Dundalk	Wexford
19:45 GMT		Report	Ciaran O'Connor 16'; Shane Grimes 57'; Shane Grimes 88'	Stadium: Ferrycarrig Park

Semi-final

22 September 2015	St Patrick's Athletic	0–1	Dundalk	Inchicore
19:45 GMT		Report	Stephen O'Donnell 51'	Stadium: Richmond Park

Final

26 October 2015	Dundalk	3–1	Shamrock Rovers	Dundalk
19:45 GMT	Kurtis Byrne 53'; Kurtis Byrne 56'; Chris Shields 90+5'	Report	Aaron Dobbs 81'	Stadium: Oriel Park; Attendance: 963; Referee: Simon Rogers

=== Europe ===
==== Champions League ====
Second qualifying round

15 July 2015
19:30

BATE Borisov (Belarus)	2–1	(Republic of Ireland) Dundalk
Karnitsky 11'; Yablonskiy 38'	Report	McMillan 32'

Borisov Arena, Barysaw
Attendance: 11,421
Referee: Vlado Glođović (Serbia)
22 July 2015
20:45

Dundalk (Republic of Ireland)	0–0	(Belarus) BATE Borisov
	Report

Oriel Park, Dundalk
Attendance: 3,103
Referee: Stavros Tritsonis (Greece)

BATE Borisov won 2–1 on aggregate.

== Awards ==
=== Player of the Month ===
Month	Nationality	Player	Reference
March	Ireland	David McMillan	
April	Ireland	Richie Towell	
May	Ireland	Daryl Horgan	
September	Ireland	Richie Towell	
November	Ireland	Richie Towell	

=== PFAI Player of the Year ===
Player	Reference
(Republic of Ireland) Richie Towell	

=== FAI League of Ireland Player of the Year ===
Player	Reference
(Republic of Ireland) Richie Towell	

=== SWAI Personality of the Year ===
Person	Reference
(Republic of Ireland) Richie Towell	

=== RTÉ Sports Team of the Year ===
Team	Reference
(Republic of Ireland) Dundalk F.C.	
