= 2014 Dundalk F.C. season =

Dundalk
2014 season
- Manager: Stephen Kenny
- Premier Division: 1st (champions)
- FAI Cup: Quarter-final
- League Cup: Winners
- Setanta Cup: Runners-up
- Leinster Senior Cup: Round 4
- Europa League: 2Q
- Top goalscorer: League: Patrick Hoban (20); All: Patrick Hoban (24)
- Highest home attendance: 5,000 (est) (vs. Cork City, 24 October 2014)
Home colours	Away colours

Dundalk entered the 2014 season having finished as runners-up in 2013. 2014 was Stephen Kenny's second season at the club as manager. It was Dundalk's sixth consecutive season in the top tier of Irish football, their 79th in all, and their 88th in the League of Ireland.

== Season summary ==
Before the League programme got underway, Dundalk were defeated by St Patrick's Athletic in the fourth round of the Leinster Senior Cup. The 33 round League programme commenced on 7 March 2014, and they were surprisingly beaten 4–1 away to Drogheda United on the opening night. But they quickly reached the top of the table and, as the season progressed, and with defending champions St Patrick's Athletic falling away, Dundalk and Cork City were left to compete for the title. On the final night of the season, Dundalk defeated Cork 2–0 in Oriel Park to win the title – their tenth, and first since 1994–95.

In the remaining cup competitions, they reached the final of the 2014 Setanta Sports Cup – losing to Sligo Rovers 1–0 in a rain-drenched match. They won the 2014 League of Ireland Cup final with a 3–2 victory over Shamrock Rovers in Oriel Park, thereby winning the club's first League and League Cup double. The League Cup win came five days after Rovers had defeated Dundalk in the 2014 FAI Cup quarter-final, which had gone to a replay.

In Europe they were knocked out at the second hurdle, losing to Hajduk Split in the Europa League second qualifying round. Having comfortably defeated Jeunesse Esch 5–1 on aggregate in the first qualifying round, they lost the first leg of the second qualifying round 2–0 in Oriel. But they recovered from going a goal down in Split to take a 2–1 lead, just falling short of the third away goal that would have won the tie.

=== First-Team Squad (2014) ===
Name	Date of birth	Position	Debut season	League appearances	Goals
(Scotland) Peter Cherrie	25 September 1981	GK	2009	33	0
(Republic of Ireland) Sean Gannon	11 July 1991	DF	2014	33	2
(Republic of Ireland) Brian Gartland	4 November 1986	DF	2013	30	8
(Republic of Ireland) Andy Boyle	7 March 1991	DF	2013	32	2
(Republic of Ireland) Chris Shields	27 December 1990	MF	2012	28	0
(Republic of Ireland) Stephen O'Donnell	15 January 1986	MF	2013	12	2
(Republic of Ireland) Daryl Horgan	10 August 1992	MF	2014	33	5
(Republic of Ireland) John Mountney	22 February 1993	MF	2012	21	2
(Republic of Ireland) David McMillan	14 December 1988	FW	2014	23	7
(Northern Ireland) Ruaidhrí Higgins	23 October 1984	MF	2014	23	0
(Republic of Ireland) Kurtis Byrne	9 April 1990	FW	2013	31	7
(Republic of Ireland) Dane Massey	17 April 1988	DF	2013	33	2
(Republic of Ireland) Richie Towell	17 July 1991	MF	2013	33	11
(Republic of Ireland) Patrick Hoban	28 July 1991	FW	2013	32	20
(Republic of Ireland) Darren Meenan	1 October 1991	MF	2013	32	3
(Republic of Ireland) Donal McDermott	19 October 1989	FW	2014	11	0
(Republic of Ireland) Mark Rossiter	27 May 1983	DF	2013	6	0
(Republic of Ireland) Mark Griffin	16 June 1991	FW	2008	10	0
(Republic of Ireland) Georgie Poynton	8 September 1997	MF	2013	0	0
(Romania) Gabriel Sava	15 September 1986	GK	2014	0	0

== Competitions ==
=== Premier Division ===
7 March 2014 Round 1	Drogheda United	4–1	Dundalk

14 March 2014 Round 2	Dundalk	2–1	Limerick

22 March 2014 Round 3	Sligo Rovers	0–1	Dundalk

28 March 2014 Round 4	Dundalk	1–1	Bohemians

4 April 2014 Round 5	St Patrick's Athletic	1–4	Dundalk

7 April 2014 Round 6	Dundalk	3–0	Derry City

11 April 2014 Round 7	UCD	1–4	Dundalk

18 April 2014 Round 8	Dundalk	2–2	Shamrock Rovers

21 April 2014 Round 9	Athlone Town	0–1	Dundalk

25 April 2014 Round 10	Bray Wanderers	1–0	Dundalk

2 May 2014 Round 11	Dundalk	4–0	Cork City

16 May 2014 Round 12	Limerick	1–2	Dundalk

20 May 2014 Round 13	Dundalk	7–0	Drogheda United

23 May 2014 Round 14	Dundalk	3–0	Sligo Rovers

30 May 2014 Round 15	Bohemians	0–2	Dundalk

2 June 2014 Round 16	Dundalk	5–2	UCD

13 June 2014 Round 17	Dundalk	0–0	St Patrick's Athletic

27 June 2014 Round 18	Dundalk	2–2	Derry City

13 July 2014 Round 19	Shamrock Rovers	0–1	Dundalk

20 July 2014 Round 20	Dundalk	2–0	Athlone Town

27 July 2014 Round 21	Dundalk	5–1	Bray Wanderers

1 August 2014 Round 22	Cork City	1–2	Dundalk

8 August 2014 Round 23	Drogheda United	1–1	Dundalk

15 August 2014 Round 24	Dundalk	1–0	Limerick

18 August 2014 Round 25	Sligo Rovers	1–1	Dundalk

29 August 2014 Round 26	Dundalk	3–2	Bohemians

5 September 2014 Round 27	St Patrick's Athletic	1–0	Dundalk

5 September 2014 Round 28	Dundalk	5–0	Derry City

26 September 2014 Round 29	UCD	0–2	Dundalk

10 October 2014 Round 30	Athlone Town	0–3	Dundalk

13 October 2014 Round 31	Dundalk	0–0	Shamrock Rovers

17 October 2014 Round 32	Bray Wanderers	1–1	Dundalk

24 October 2014 Round 33	Dundalk	2–0	Cork City

==== League table ====
Pos	Team	Pld	W	D	L	GF	GA	GD	Pts	Qualification or relegation
1	Dundalk (C)	33	22	8	3	73	24	+49	74	Qualification for Champions League second qualifying round
2	Cork City	33	22	6	5	51	25	+26	72	Qualification for Europa League first qualifying round
3	St Patrick's Athletic	33	19	8	6	66	37	+29	65	Qualification for Europa League first qualifying round
4	Shamrock Rovers	33	18	8	7	43	26	+17	62	Qualification for Europa League first qualifying round
5	Sligo Rovers	33	12	7	14	44	36	+8	43	

Rules for classification: 1) points; 2) goal difference; 3) number of goals scored.
(C) Champions

=== FAI Cup ===
Second round

6 June	Dundalk	3–0	Sligo Rovers	Oriel Park
19:45	David McMillan 31'; Daryl Horgan 47'; Brian Gartland 65'	Report		Attendance: 2,016; Referee: Paul Tuite

Third round

22 August 2014	Dundalk	2–1	Galway United	Oriel Park, Dundalk
	McDermott 28'; Mountney 73'	Report	Cunningham 81'	Attendance: 1,441; Referee: Paul Tuite

Quarter Final

12 September 2014	Shamrock Rovers	0–0	Dundalk	Tallaght Stadium
19:05		Report

Quarter Final Replay

15 September 2014	Dundalk	1–2	Shamrock Rovers	Oriel Park
19:45	Hoban 41'	Report	Sheppard 81', 88'	Attendance: 2,016; Referee: David McKeon

=== League Cup ===
Second round

5 May 2014	Bray Wanderers	0−3	Dundalk	Carlisle Grounds, Bray
16:00		Report	McMillan 51', 77'; McDonald 58'	Referee: Rob Harvey

Quarter Final

27 May 2014	Derry City	1–2	Dundalk	Brandywell Stadium, Derry
19:45	McEleney 82'	Report	McMillan 26'; Byrne 75'	Referee: David McKeon

Semi-final

4 August 2014	Dundalk	5–0	Wexford Youths	Oriel Park, Dundalk
17:00	Griffin 24'; Ward 42'; McMillan 77', 79', 90+3'	Report		Attendance: 1078; Referee: Rob Harvey

Final

19 September 2014	Dundalk	3–2	Shamrock Rovers	Oriel Park, Dundalk
	Massey 4', 46'; Hoban 49'	Report	McGuinness 28'; Kilduff 76'	Referee: Graham Kelly

=== Setanta Cup ===
Quarter Final First Leg

24 February 2014	Dundalk	2–3	Coleraine	Oriel Park, Dundalk
19:45 GMT	Horgan 18'; McMillan 60'	Report	McDaid 34', 49'; Harkin 58'	Attendance: 1,500; Referee: Paul McLaughlin

Quarter Final Second Leg

10 March 2014	Coleraine	0–2	Dundalk	The Showgrounds, Coleraine
19:45 GMT		Report	Hoban 51'; O'Donnell 90+2'	Referee: Ray Hetherington

Dundalk won 4–3 on aggregate.

Semi-final first leg

24 March 2014	Shamrock Rovers	1−2	Dundalk	Tallaght Stadium, Dublin
19:45 GMT	Zayed 84'	Report	Towell 11' (pen.), 33' (pen.)	Attendance: 750; Referee: Paul Tuite

Semi-final second Leg

15 April 2014	Dundalk	1−0	Shamrock Rovers	Oriel Park, Dundalk
19:45 IST	Shields 47'	Report		Attendance: 1,976; Referee: Raymond Crangle

Dundalk won 3–1 on aggregate.

Final

10 May 2014	Dundalk	0−1	Sligo Rovers	Tallaght Stadium, Dublin
16:00 IST		Report	O'Connor 13'	Attendance: 2,600; Referee: Arnold Hunter

=== Leinster Senior Cup ===
Fourth round

17 February 2014	Dundalk	1–2	St Patrick's Athletic	Inchicore
19:45 GMT	David McMillan 69'	Report	Fahey 63'; Kavanagh 73'	Stadium: Richmond Park; Referee: Neil Doyle

=== Europe ===
==== Europa League ====
First qualifying round

1 July 2014
17:45

Jeunesse Esch (Luxembourg)	0–2	(Republic of Ireland) Dundalk
	Report	Towell 59' (pen.), 71'

Stade de la Frontière, Esch-sur-Alzette
Attendance: 759
Referee: Lorenc Jemini (Albania)
10 July 2014
20:45

Dundalk (Republic of Ireland)	3–1	(Luxembourg) Jeunesse Esch
Gartland 8'; Byrne 37'; Mountney 45+1'	Report	Zydko 55'

Oriel Park, Dundalk
Attendance: 2,534
Referee: Tsvetan Krastev (Bulgaria)

Dundalk won 5–1 on aggregate.

Second qualifying round

17 July 2014
20:45

Dundalk (Republic of Ireland)	0–2	(Croatia) Hajduk Split
	Report	Caktaš 9'; Vlašić 75'

Oriel Park, Dundalk
Attendance: 3,014
Referee: Markus Hameter (Austria)
24 July 2014
20:15

Hajduk Split (Croatia)	1–2	(Republic of Ireland) Dundalk
Kouassi 25'	Report	Hoban 66'; Byrne 74'

Stadion Poljud, Split
Attendance: 15,000
Referee: Ionuț Avram (Romania)

Hajduk Split won 3–2 on aggregate.

== Awards ==
=== Player of the Month ===
Month	Nationality	Player	Reference
May	Ireland	Daryl Horgan	
July	Ireland	Richie Towell	
September	Ireland	Dane Massey	
October	Ireland	Patrick Hoban	

=== SWAI Personality of the Year ===
Person	Reference
(Republic of Ireland) Stephen Kenny	
