= 2015 FAI Cup final =

- Event: 2015 FAI Cup
Cork City	Dundalk
0	1
- Date: 8 November 2015
- Venue: Aviva Stadium, Dublin
- Referee: David McKeon
- Attendance: 25,103

The 2015 FAI Cup final was the final match of the 2015 FAI Cup, the national association football cup of the Republic of Ireland. The match took place on 8 November 2015 at the Aviva Stadium in Dublin, and was contested between Cork City and Dundalk. Dundalk were looking to achieve the Double, having already won the league title.

The match was broadcast live on RTÉ Two and RTÉ Two HD in Ireland, and via the RTÉ Player worldwide.

The match finished scoreless in normal time, but a goal from Richie Towell in extra-time, from a Daryl Horgan pass, was enough to win the Cup for Dundalk for a tenth time. With the win, Dundalk claimed their third league and cup double.

== Match ==
8 November 2015
15.30 GMT

Cork City	0-1 (a.e.t.)	Dundalk
	Report	Richie Towell 107'

Aviva Stadium
Attendance: 25,103
Referee: David McKeon

Cork City	Dundalk FC

Cork City:
(Republic of Ireland) Mark McNulty
(Republic of Ireland) Alan Bennett
(Republic of Ireland) Darren Dennehy
(Republic of Ireland) Ross Gaynor (yellow card) 81'
(Republic of Ireland) Garry Buckley
(Republic of Ireland) Billy Dennehy
(Republic of Ireland) John Dunleavy
(Republic of Ireland) Liam Miller (yellow card) 41'	(substituted off) 60'
(Republic of Ireland) Kevin O'Connor
(Republic of Ireland) Mark O'Sullivan	(substituted off) 80'
(Republic of Ireland) Karl Sheppard	(substituted off) 101'
Substitutes:
(Republic of Ireland) Colin Healy	(substituted on) 60'
(Republic of Ireland) Gavan Holohan
(Republic of Ireland) Liam Kearney
(Republic of Ireland) Michael McSweeney
(Republic of Ireland) Danny Morrissey	(substituted on) 80'
(England) Dan Murray	(substituted on) 101'
(Republic of Ireland) Alan Smith
Manager: (Republic of Ireland) John Caulfield

Dundalk FC:
(Republic of Ireland) Gary Rogers
(Republic of Ireland) Dane Massey
(Republic of Ireland) Brian Gartland
(Republic of Ireland) Andy Boyle
(Republic of Ireland) Sean Gannon	(substituted off) 44'
(Republic of Ireland) Richie Towell (yellow card) 108'
(Republic of Ireland) Chris Shields (yellow card) 85'
(Republic of Ireland) Darren Meenan	(substituted off) 78'
(Republic of Ireland) Daryl Horgan
(Republic of Ireland) Ronan Finn
(Republic of Ireland) David McMillan	(substituted off) 71'
Substitutes:
(Romania) Gabriel Sava
(Republic of Ireland) Stephen O'Donnell	(substituted on) 44'
(Republic of Ireland) John Mountney	(substituted on) 78'
(Republic of Ireland) Ciarán Kilduff	(substituted on) 71'
(Republic of Ireland) Shane Grimes
(Republic of Ireland) Kurtis Byrne
(Republic of Ireland) Paddy Barrett
Manager: (Republic of Ireland) Stephen Kenny
