= 2014 League of Ireland Cup final =

- Event: 2014 League of Ireland Cup
Dundalk	Shamrock Rovers
3	2
- Date: 20 September 2014
- Venue: Oriel Park, Dundalk
- Referee: G. Kelly
- Attendance: 4,000 (est)

The 2014 League of Ireland Cup final was the final match of the 2014 League of Ireland Cup, called the EA Sports Cup for sponsorship purposes, a knock-out association football competition contested annually by clubs affiliated with the League of Ireland. It took place on 20 September 2014 at Oriel Park in Dundalk, and was contested by Dundalk and Shamrock Rovers. Dundalk won the match 3–2 to win the competition for the fifth time.

== Background ==
The League Cup was the first trophy of the 2014 League of Ireland season. The two sides were meeting for the seventh time that season. Dundalk had beaten Rovers in both legs of the 2014 Setanta Sports Cup semi-final, and had won one and drawn one of the two league matches already played between the sides. In the FAI Cup semi-final Rovers had won the replay 2–1 in Oriel Park after a 0–0 draw in the first game. Rovers were the League Cup holders and were chasing only their third win in the competition's history. To reach the final they had defeated Drogheda United (2–1), Cork City (2–0), and Bohemians (2–0).

Dundalk had last won the cup in 1989 – their fourth win – and hadn't reached the final since 1995. They had overcome Bray Wanderers (3–0), Derry City (2–1), and Wexford (5–0) to reach the 2014 final.

The match was broadcast live on Setanta Sports.

== Match ==
=== Summary ===
The match was the third time the two sides had met in eight days, and the opening minutes saw a number of strong challenges. One such challenge resulted in a foul on David McMillan, and Dane Massey put Dundalk ahead from the subsequent free kick. They then sat back somewhat, and, with Rovers taking control and creating a number of chances, Jason McGuinness equalised from a corner. But Rovers failed to capitalise again before half-time, and, within minutes of the second half starting, Dundalk had established a two-goal lead, with headers from Massey and Patrick Hoban. Late on Ciarán Kilduff headed home to give Rovers a chance. But Dundalk saw the match out to win their first trophy of Stephen Kenny's reign, which was also the first half of the club's first League and League Cup Double.

=== Details ===
20 September 2014
17:45

Dundalk	3–2	Shamrock Rovers
Dane Massey 4', 46'; Patrick Hoban 49'	Report	Jason McGuinness 28'; Ciarán Kilduff 76'

Oriel Park
Attendance: 4,000 (est)
Referee: G. Kelly

Dundalk	Shamrock Rovers

GK	(Romania) Gabriel Sava
RB	(Republic of Ireland) Seán Gannon
CB	(Republic of Ireland) Brian Gartland
CB	(Republic of Ireland) Mark Rossiter (c)	(substituted off) 87'
LB	(Republic of Ireland) Dane Massey
MF	(Republic of Ireland) Keith Ward	(substituted off) 45'
MF	(Northern Ireland) Ruaidhrí Higgins	(substituted off) 80'
MF	(Republic of Ireland) Daryl Horgan
MF	(Republic of Ireland) Richie Towell
FW	(Republic of Ireland) Patrick Hoban
FW	(Republic of Ireland) David McMillan
Substitutes:
MF	(Republic of Ireland) Chris Shields	(substituted on) 45'
MF	(Republic of Ireland) John Mountney	(substituted on) 80'
DF	(Republic of Ireland) Andy Boyle	(substituted on) 87'
Manager:
(Republic of Ireland) Stephen Kenny

GK		(Republic of Ireland) Craig Hyland
DF		(Republic of Ireland) Jason McGuinness
DF		(Republic of Ireland) Conor Kenna
DF		(Republic of Ireland) Simon Madden
DF		(Republic of Ireland) Luke Byrne
MF		(Republic of Ireland) Sean O'Connor
MF		(Republic of Ireland) Ronan Finn (substituted off) 73'
MF		(Republic of Ireland) Stephen McPhail
MF		(Republic of Ireland) Patrick Cregg
FW		(Republic of Ireland) Kieran 'Marty' Waters	(substituted off) 68'
FW		(Republic of Ireland) Karl Sheppard	(substituted off) 80'
Substitutes:
FW	22	(Republic of Ireland) Ciarán Kilduff	(substituted on) 68'
MF	10	(Republic of Ireland) Gary McCabe	(substituted on) 73'
FW	29	(Republic of Ireland) Dean Kelly	(substituted on) 80'
Manager:
(Republic of Ireland) Pat Fenlon
