= 2013 Dundalk F.C. season =

Dundalk
2013 season
- Manager: Stephen Kenny
- Premier Division: Runners-up
- FAI Cup: Semi-Final
- League Cup: Round 2
- Leinster Senior Cup: Quarter-final
- Top goalscorer: League: Patrick Hoban (14); All: Patrick Hoban (18)
- Highest home attendance: 3,324 (vs. Drogheda United, 8 September 2013)
Home colours	Away colours

Dundalk entered the 2013 season having spent the 2012 season rooted in the relegation play-off spot. The club had been put up for sale, and, with the assistance of a Supporters Trust, it was taken over by local businessmen Andy Connolly and Paul Brown (owners of the team's official sponsors, Fastfix). They subsequently managed to remain in the top-flight by winning a promotion/relegation play-off. With the takeover complete and the club saved, the new owners turned to Stephen Kenny - out of work since being sacked by Shamrock Rovers - to become the new manager ahead of the season. 2013 was Dundalk's fifth consecutive season in the top tier of Irish football, their 78th in all, and their 87th in the League of Ireland.

== Season summary ==
When the 33 round League programme commenced on 8 March 2013, neither supporters nor pundits were sure what to expect, and Dundalk failed to win any of the first five home matches. But with Kenny's team clicking into gear as his ideas took hold, they rose up the table to mount an unexpected title challenge, eventually finishing second - a defeat to eventual champions St. Patrick's Athletic ultimately costing them the title.

In the cup competitions, they exited in both the second round of the League Cup, and the quarter-final of the Leinster Senior Cup, to Shamrock Rovers. They reached the semi-final of the FAI Cup and were defeated 1–0 away to 'Louth Derby' rivals, Drogheda United, in a tempestuous game - referee Anthony Buttimer sent off two Dundalk players inside half an hour, and Drogheda took the lead from the penalty spot after the second red card. But the nine men of Dundalk prevented Drogheda scoring again.

=== First-Team Squad (2013) ===
Name	Date of birth	Position	Debut season	League appearances	Goals
(Scotland) Peter Cherrie	25 September 1981	GK	2009	33	0
(Republic of Ireland) John Sullivan	6 January 1991	DF	2013	28	1
(Republic of Ireland) Brian Gartland	4 November 1986	DF	2013	13	2
(Republic of Ireland) Andy Boyle	7 March 1991	DF	2013	32	1
(Republic of Ireland) Chris Shields	27 December 1990	MF	2012	19	1
(Republic of Ireland) Stephen O'Donnell	15 January 1986	MF	2013	22	3
(Republic of Ireland) John Dillon	2 August 1988	MF	2013	29	5
(Republic of Ireland) John Mountney	22 February 1993	MF	2012	20	2
(Republic of Ireland) Vinny Faherty	13 June 1987	FW	2013	22	1
(Republic of Ireland) Keith Ward	12 October 1990	MF	2013	17	1
(Republic of Ireland) Kurtis Byrne	9 April 1990	FW	2013	30	7
(Republic of Ireland) Dane Massey	17 April 1988	DF	2013	30	4
(Republic of Ireland) Richie Towell	17 July 1991	MF	2013	31	7
(Republic of Ireland) Patrick Hoban	28 July 1991	FW	2013	28	14
(Republic of Ireland) Darren Meenan	1 October 1991	MF	2013	28	0
(Republic of Ireland) Tiarnan Mulvenna	10 December 1988	FW	2003	21	5
(Republic of Ireland) Mark Rossiter	27 May 1983	DF	2013	28	0
(Northern Ireland) Stephen McDonnell	28 June 1992	MF	2012	11	0
(Northern Ireland) Francis McCaffrey	22 April 1993	MF	2013	7	0
(Republic of Ireland) Jordan Keegan	5 February 1992	MF	2013	6	0
(Republic of Ireland) Eoghan Osbourne	5 March 1992	DF	2011	5	0

== Competitions ==
=== Premier Division ===
Pos	Team	Pld	W	D	L	GF	GA	GD	Pts	Qualification or relegation
1	St Patrick's Athletic (C)	33	21	8	4	56	20	+36	71	Qualification for Champions League second qualifying round
2	Dundalk	33	21	5	7	55	30	+25	68	Qualification for Europa League first qualifying round
3	Sligo Rovers	33	19	9	5	53	22	+31	66	Qualification for Europa League first qualifying round
4	Derry City	33	17	5	11	57	39	+18	56	Qualification for Europa League first qualifying round
5	Shamrock Rovers	33	13	13	7	43	28	+15	52	
6	Cork City	33	13	7	13	47	50	−3	46	
7	Limerick	33	11	9	13	38	46	−8	42	
8	Drogheda United	33	8	14	11	44	46	−2	38	
9	UCD	33	8	6	19	45	73	−28	30	
10	Bohemians	33	7	8	18	27	47	−20	29	
11	Bray Wanderers (O)	33	7	6	20	33	66	−33	27	Qualification for relegation play-off
12	Shelbourne (R)	33	5	6	22	25	56	−31	21	Relegation for League of Ireland First Division

Rules for classification: 1) points; 2) goal difference; 3) number of goals scored.
(C) Champions; (O) Play-off winners; (R) Relegated

=== FAI Cup ===
Second round

31 May 2013	Phoenix	0–4	Dundalk	Oriel Park, Dundalk
19:45		Report	Hoban 7', 25'; Byrne 39'; Mulvenna 89'	Referee: Adriano Reale

Third round

23 August 2013	Dundalk	5–3	Limerick	Oriel Park, Dundalk
19:45	O'Donnell 6' (pen.); Towell 24'; Byrne 38', 61'; Meenan 58'	Report	Bossekota 16'; Gaffney 75'	Attendance: 1,321; Referee: Anthony Buttimer

Quarter Final

13 September 2013	Shelbourne	1–5	Dundalk	Tolka Park, Dublin
20:00	Murphy 50'	Report	Towell 13', 45'; Boyle 19'; Hoban 32'; Byrne 44'	Attendance: 1,158; Referee: Padraigh Sutton

Semi-final

6 October 2013	Drogheda United	1–0	Dundalk	Hunky Dorys Park, Drogheda
13:45	Brennan 31' (pen.)	Report		Attendance: 2,000; Referee: Anthony Buttimer

=== League Cup ===
First round

11 March 2013	Dundalk	1−0	Shelbourne	Oriel Park, Dundalk
19:45	Byrne 75'	Report		Attendance: 300 (est); Referee: Paul Tuite

Second round

21 May 2013	Shamrock Rovers	1–0	Dundalk	Tallaght Stadium, Dublin
20:00	Kilduff 56'	Report		Attendance: 500 (est); Referee: Paul Tuite

=== Leinster Senior Cup ===
Fourth round

20 February 2013	Sheriff Y.C.	1–2 (a.e.t.)	Dundalk	Dublin
20:00 GMT		Report	Kurtis Byrne 92'; Patrick Hoban 119'	Stadium: Fairview Park

Quarter Final

15 July 2013	Shamrock Rovers	4–1	Dundalk	Dublin
19:45 GMT	Sheppard 28'; Quigley 45'; Zayed 57'; Stewart 67'	Report	Ciaran O'Connor 51'	Stadium: Fairview Park; Attendance: 500 (est); Referee: Ben Connolly

== Awards ==
=== Player of the Month ===
Month	Nationality	Player	Reference
July	Ireland	Patrick Hoban	
August	Ireland	Richie Towell	

=== PFAI Players' Young Player of the Year ===
Person	Reference
(Republic of Ireland) Richie Towell	
