= Robert Egan (footballer) =

Republic of Ireland footballer

Personal information
- Place of birth: County Tipperary, Ireland
- Position: Winger

Senior career*
Years	Team	Apps	(Gls)
1928–1929	Dundalk	6	(4)
1929–????	Newry Town		

International career
1929	Republic of Ireland	1	(0)
- * Club domestic league appearances and goals

Robert Egan was a Republic of Ireland international footballer.

== Career ==
A left winger, Egan was capped once for the Republic of Ireland at senior level. He made his debut in a 4–0 win over Belgium on 20 April 1929 in Dalymount Park, Dublin.

At club level, Egan played for Dundalk and Newry Town. Born in County Tipperary, he was spotted in 1928 playing at junior level by Dundalk manager Joe McCleery who immediately signed him. His Dundalk debut was in a League of Ireland game against Brideville on 25 November 1928 and he became an ever-present for the remainder of the 1928/29 season. His nine-goal total was second only to Eddie Carroll's 37.

Egan and Carroll left Dundalk at the end of the season and signed for Newry Town.
