= Peter Cherrie =

Scottish footballer (born 1983)

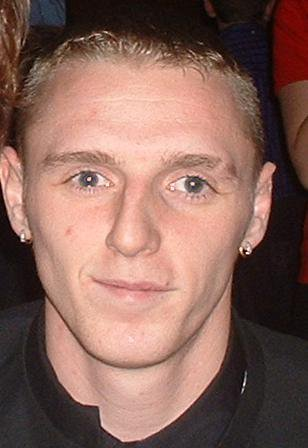
- Peter Cherrie, 2006

Personal information
- Date of birth: 1 October 1983 (age 43)
- Place of birth: Bellshill, Scotland
- Height: 1.88 m (6 ft 2 in)
- Position: Goalkeeper

Team information
- Current team: Dundalk (goalkeeping coach)

Senior career*
Years	Team	Apps	(Gls)
2002–2004	Airdrie United	2	(0)
2004–2005	Ayr United	6	(0)
2005–2009	Clyde	36	(0)
2009–2014	Dundalk	179	(0)
2015	Cliftonville	13	(0)
2015–2017	Bray Wanderers	81	(0)
2018	Cork City	7	(0)
2019–2020	Derry City	52	(0)
2021–2023	Dundalk	18	(0)
2024–2026	Dundalk	20	(0)

Managerial career
- 2024–: Dundalk (player/goalkeeping coach)
- * Club domestic league appearances and goals as of 10 November 2026

Peter Cherrie (born 1 October 1983) is a Scottish former footballer who is currently goalkeeping coach of League of Ireland Premier Division club Dundalk.

== Career ==
Cherrie started his career with Airdrie United. He played one game for them before moving to Ayr United.

Cherrie signed for Clyde after impressing in a trial and a subsequent glamour friendly with Manchester United in July 2005, which saw him come up against Ruud van Nistelrooy and Wayne Rooney. Cherrie made his competitive debut for Clyde against Peterhead in the Scottish League Cup in August 2005. Later that season, Cherrie played in the Bully Wee's Scottish Cup giant killing over Celtic.

Cherrie was released in May 2007 after his contract expired. However, he was brought back to the club by new manager Colin Hendry. Due to the good form of David Hutton, Cherrie didn't get a minute of first team action in the 2007–08 season, however, a series of good performances in Clyde's pre-season friendlies of 2008 saw him challenge Hutton for the #1 jersey, and he started his first competitive match for 18 months in August 2008. Cherrie was released by Clyde in June 2009 along with the rest of the out of contract players, due to the club's financial position.

On 8 July 2009, he signed for Irish side Dundalk. Since arriving at Dundalk, Cherrie's form has been excellent, making him one of the most favourite players amongst the Dundalk supporters. At the end of the 2010 Airtricity League season, Peter was voted as Dundalk's Player of the Year. On 29 October 2010, Peter signed a new one-year deal with Dundalk, keeping him with the club through the 2011 season. He once again signed a one-year deal with Dundalk on 31 January 2012. He made his 100th league appearance for Dundalk against Derry City in Oriel Park on 20 July 2012.

Peter signed for Bray Wanderers in July 2015 and made his debut keeping a clean sheet in their 1–0 win away at Limerick. He played every game from then until the end of the season helping Bray to an 8th-place finish and an FAI Cup semi-final. In November 2015, Cherrie signed a new two-year contract with Bray. Cherrie played every league match for Bray in 2017 and made a Bray Wanderers club record keeping six clean sheets in a row between 3 June and 16 July.

Cherrie signed for League and FAI Cup champions Cork City on 17 January 2018.

== Career statistics ==
As of match played 30 October 2026

Appearances and goals by club, season and competition
Club	Season	League			National Cup		League Cup		Europe		Other		Total	
Club	Season	Division	Apps	Goals	Apps	Goals	Apps	Goals	Apps	Goals	Apps	Goals	Apps	Goals
Airdrie United	2002–03	Scottish Second Division	0	0	0	0	0	0	—		0	0	0	0
Airdrie United	2003–04	Scottish Second Division	2	0	0	0	0	0	—		0	0	2	0
Airdrie United	Total		2	0	0	0	0	0	—		0	0	2	0
Ayr United	2002–03	Scottish Second Division	6	0	0	0	0	0	—		0	0	6	0
Clyde	2005–06	Scottish First Division	20	0	1	0	0	0	—		0	0	21	0
Clyde	2006–07	Scottish First Division	11	0	0	0	0	0	—		0	0	11	0
Clyde	2007–08	Scottish First Division	0	0	0	0	0	0	—		0	0	0	0
Clyde	2008–09	Scottish First Division	5	0	0	0	2	0	—		2 (Note: Appearances in the Scottish Challenge Cup)	0	9	0
Clyde	Total		36	0	1	0	2	0	—		2	0	41	0
Dundalk	2009	LOI Premier Division	16	0	0	0	0	0	—		—		16	0
Dundalk	2010	LOI Premier Division	33	0	0	0	0	0	2 (Note: Appearances in the UEFA Europa League)	0	—		35	0
Dundalk	2011	LOI Premier Division	32	0	4	0	0	0	—		7 (Note: Appearances in the Setanta Sports Cup)	0	43	0
Dundalk	2012	LOI Premier Division	32	0	3	0	1	0	—		2 (Note: Appearances in the 2012 League of Ireland Promotion/Relegation Playoff)	0	38	0
Dundalk	2013	LOI Premier Division	33	0	2	0	2	0	—		—		37	0
Dundalk	2014	LOI Premier Division	33	0	2	0	0	0	3	0	5	0	43	0
Dundalk	Total		179	0	11	0	3	0	5	0	14	0	212	0
Cliftonville	2014–15	NIFL Premiership	13	0	1	0	1	0	—		—		15	0
Bray Wanderers	2015	LOI Premier Division	16	0	2	0	0	0	—		—		18	0
Bray Wanderers	2016	LOI Premier Division	33	0	0	0	2	0	—		—		35	0
Bray Wanderers	2017	LOI Premier Division	32	0	0	0	2	0	—		1	0	35	0
Bray Wanderers	Total		81	0	2	0	4	0	—		1	0	88	0
Cork City	2018	LOI Premier Division	7	0	1	0	1	0	2 (Note: Appearances in UEFA Champions League)	0	1 (Note: Appearances in the President of Ireland's Cup)	0	12	0
Derry City	2019	LOI Premier Division	34	0	0	0	1	0	—		—		35	0
Derry City	2020	LOI Premier Division	18	0	2	0	—		1	0	—		21	0
Derry City	Total		52	0	2	0	1	0	1	0	0	0	56	0
Dundalk	2021	LOI Premier Division	15	0	3	0	—		0	0	—		18	0
Dundalk	2022	LOI Premier Division	3	0	0	0	—		—		—		3	0
Dundalk	2023	LOI Premier Division	0	0	0	0	—		0	0	0	0	0	0
Dundalk	Total		18	0	3	0	—		0	0	0	0	21	0
Dundalk	2024	LOI Premier Division	0	0	0	0	—		—		0	0	0	0
Dundalk	2025	LOI First Division	18	0	0	0	—		—		2 (Note: Appearances in the Leinster Senior Cup)	0	20	0
Dundalk	2026	LOI Premier Division	2	0	2	0	—		—		3	0	7	0
Dundalk	Total		20	0	2	0	—		—		5	0	27	0
Career Total			414	0	23	0	12	0	8	0	23	0	480	0

== Honours ==
Airdrie United

- Scottish Second Division: 2003–04

Dundalk

- League of Ireland Premier Division: 2014
- League of Ireland Cup: 2014
- President of Ireland's Cup: 2021
- League of Ireland First Division: 2025
- Leinster Senior Cup: 2024–25

Cliftonville

- Northern Ireland Football League Cup: 2014–15
