= Willie O'Neill (Irish footballer) =

Irish association footballer

Billy O'Neill
Personal information
- Full name: William O'Neill
- Date of birth: 21 January 1916
- Place of birth: Dundalk, Ireland
- Date of death: 30 August 1978 (aged 62)
- Place of death: Dundalk, Ireland
- Position: Defender

Senior career*
Years	Team	Apps	(Gls)
1934-1944	Dundalk	330	(30)

International career
1935–1939	Irish Free State	11	(0)
- * Club domestic league appearances and goals

William O'Neill was an Irish footballer for Dundalk and an Irish international, who played as a defender.

== International ==
O'Neill was capped eleven times for the Irish Free State at senior level. His debut was in a 5–3 home defeat to Netherlands on 8 December 1935. with his final cap coming in a 1–1 draw away to Germany on 23 May 1939.
