= Dicky Lunn =

Republic of Ireland footballer

Personal information
- Full name: Richard Lunn

International career
Years	Team	Apps	(Gls)
1938	Republic of Ireland	2	(0)

Richard "Dicky" Lunn was a Republic of Ireland international footballer.

Lunn was capped twice for the Republic of Ireland at senior level. He made his debut in a 4–0 friendly victory over Switzerland on 18 September 1938 .
