= Eddie Carroll (footballer) =

Irish footballer

Personal information
- Full name: Edward Carroll
- Date of birth: 20 August 1901
- Place of birth: Bessbrook, Ireland
- Date of death: 20 October 1974 (aged 73)
- Place of death: Bessbrook, Northern Ireland
- Position: Centre forward

Senior career*
Years	Team	Apps	(Gls)
- Bessbrook Athletic
- Newry Town
1921–1925	Glenavon		
1923–1924	→ Newry Town (loan)		
1925–1926	Aberdeen	5	(1)
1926–1927	Dundee United	21	(11)
1927–1929	Dundalk		(33)
1929–1930	Newry Town		
1930–1932	Dolphin		(11)
1932–1934	Dundalk		
1934–1936	Dolphin		(27)
1936–1937	Dundalk	5	(1)
1937–1938	Drumcondra		(3)
- Bessbrook Strollers

International career
1925	Ireland (IFA)	1	(0)
1928–1929	League of Ireland XI	2	(2)
- * Club domestic league appearances and goals

Edward Carroll (20 August 1901 – 20 October 1974) was an Irish footballer who played as a centre forward. He played for clubs in Ireland and Scotland and made one international appearance for the Ireland (IFA) national team in 1925.

== Club career ==
Eddie Carroll was born in Bessbrook, County Armagh, on 20 August 1901. He began his football career with local junior team Bessbrook Athletic before joining Newry Town. He signed for Irish League club Glenavon in 1921, then rejoined Newry Town on loan when they entered the Irish League in 1923 before returning to Glenavon the following year.

Carroll moved to Scotland in 1925, joining Aberdeen. He was unable to gain a regular place in Scottish League football for them, making only five first team appearances and scoring once, but was prolific for the reserves — at one point scoring 18 goals in a run of four consecutive matches. In September 1926, Carroll was transferred from Aberdeen to Dundee United for a £500 fee. He scored 13 goals in 25 appearances for United, including a hat-trick against Heart of Midlothian, but was released at the end of the 1926–27 season following their relegation from the top flight.

Carroll then returned to Ireland, signing for Dundalk in the League of Ireland. He made his debut on the opening day of the 1927–28 season, scoring the club's first league hat-trick in a 5–2 win over Athlone Town. He went on to score 38 goals that season, including 16 in the league. In 1928–29, his 17 league goals made him the top scorer in the League of Ireland. After a dispute with Dundalk, he spent the 1929–30 season back at Newry Town before joining Dublin-based Dolphin for their League of Ireland debut season in 1930–31. He rejoined Dundalk in 1932 and helped them to their first League of Ireland title in the 1932–33 season. In November 1933 he set a new League record by scoring four goals in a match against Dolphin. He rejoined Dolphin the following year and was part of their team that won the League of Ireland title in 1934–35. The following season, they were runners-up. By 1936–37, Carroll was player-coach at Dolphin, but it proved to be their final season in League football. After briefly returning to Dundalk, he ended his senior career at Drumcondra. Returning to his native Bessbrook, he was player-coach of local junior club Bessbrook Strollers, leading them to a double of Mid-Ulster League and Irish Junior Cup in 1945.

During a 17-year senior career, Carroll scored over 200 goals. His total of 113 goals for Dundalk is the second-highest in the club's history.

== International career ==
Carroll was selected once to represent the Ireland national team run by the Irish Football Association. While playing for Glenavon, he was called up for the match against Scotland in February 1925, but failed to make an impact in a 3–0 defeat. He also later represented the League of Ireland XI twice.
