= 2014–15 Leinster Senior Cup =

Leinster Football Association Senior Cup

Tournament details
- Country: Ireland

Final positions
- Champions: Dundalk
- Runner-up: Shamrock Rovers

The 2014–15 Leinster Senior Cup, was the 114th staging of the Leinster Senior Cup association football competition. It was won by Dundalk.

== Fourth round ==
St Patrick's Athletic	7-0	Tolka Rovers

Dundalk	2-1	UCD

Shelbourne	0-1	Newtown United

North End United	2-2 (a.e.t.) (3-4 p)	Wexford

Crettyard United	0-5	Crumlin United

Bohemians	0-0 (a.e.t.) (4-2 p)	Bray Wanderers

Drogheda United	2-2 (a.e.t.)	Longford Town

Shamrock Rovers	3-1	Athlone Town

== Quarter-final ==
Wexford	0-3	Dundalk

Newtown United	0-2	Bohemians

Longford Town	0-1	Shamrock Rovers

St Patrick's Athletic	4-0	Crumlin United

== Semi-final ==
St Patrick's Athletic	0-1	Dundalk

Bohemians	0-0 (a.e.t.) (2-4 p)	Shamrock Rovers

== Final ==
The final was played at Oriel Park on October 26, 2015.

26 October 2015	Dundalk	3-1	Shamrock Rovers	Dundalk
17:00	Kurtis Byrne 53' 56'; Chris Shields 90+5'		Aaron Dobbs 81'	Stadium: Oriel Park; Attendance: 963; Referee: Simon Rogers
