= Chris Shields =

Irish association football player

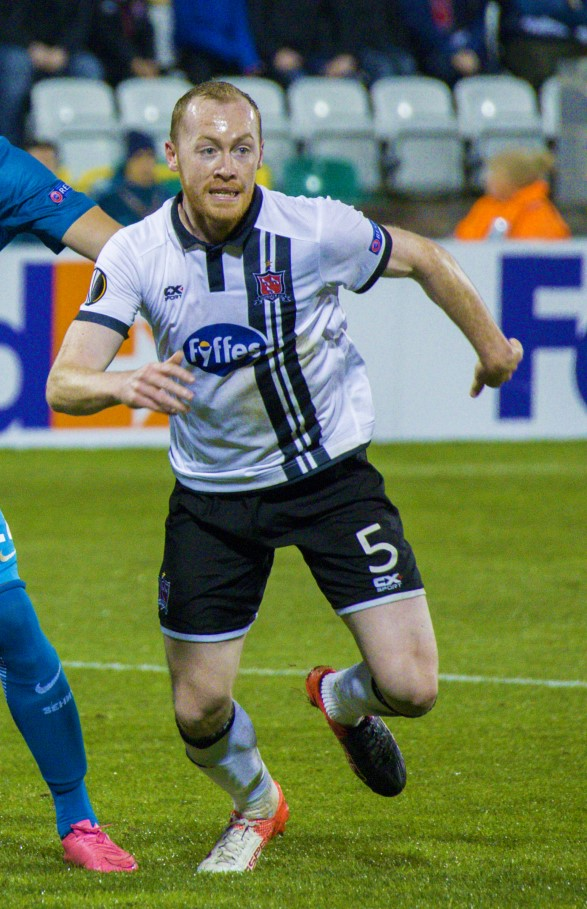
- Chris Shields playing for Dundalk against Zenit Saint Petersburg in the 2016–17 Europa League

Personal information
- Date of birth: 27 December 1990 (age 35)
- Place of birth: Dublin, Ireland
- Height: 1.85 m (6 ft 1 in)
- Position: Midfielder

Team information
- Current team: Linfield
- Number: 5

Youth career
- 1998–2008: St Francis
- 2008: Bray Wanderers

Senior career*
Years	Team	Apps	(Gls)
2008–2011	Bray Wanderers	91	(2)
2012–2021	Dundalk	250	(9)
2021–	Linfield	200	(23)
- * Club domestic league appearances and goals as of 20 September 2025

Chris Shields (born 27 December 1990) is an Irish professional footballer who plays as a midfielder for Linfield in the Irish Premiership. He previously played for Bray Wanderers where he played for four seasons before joining Dundalk, where he remained for more than nine seasons.

Shields won five Premier Division medals during his time with Dundalk, in addition to three FAI Cups. He featured regularly in European competition for the club and was part of the team that became only the second-ever Irish side to reach the group stage of the Europa League in 2016 as well as reaching the same stage in 2020.

== Career ==
=== Early career ===
A native of Clondalkin, Shields played youth football for St Francis and spent ten years there before joining League of Ireland side Bray Wanderers where he initially played for their U20 side.

=== Bray Wanderers ===
Shields made his senior League of Ireland debut with the first team in the final game of the 2008 season in a 2–0 defeat away to Sligo Rovers.

He became a first team player in the 2009 season and was part of a Bray side that battled to preserve its Premier Division status during his time with the club. The highlight of his time with Bray was an extraordinary promotion/relegation playoff match with Monaghan United in November 2010. Shields scored an own goal in the 119th minute which saw his side fall behind. Celebrations from Monaghan fans resulted in a perimeter wall collapsing and a long delay. When play resumed, Shields set up an equalizing goal for Bray and he then scored the winning penalty kick in the shoot-out that followed.

=== Dundalk ===
Shields left Bray at the end of the 2011 campaign and was a free agent training with Leinster Senior League side Booth Road Celtic F.C. when then-Dundalk manager Sean McCaffrey offered him the opportunity to move to Louth as club captain.

He was part of a team that struggled badly in the 2012 season and only avoided relegation because Monaghan United went out of business during the year. McCaffrey left his post during the year, but Dundalk succeeded in staying in the topflight after winning a promotion/relegation playoff match. Shields was one of two players to stay on when new manager Stephen Kenny was appointed, although he was not retained as captain. There was a massive improvement in the 2013 Premier Division, with Dundalk finishing in second place, three points behind winners St. Pat's, and they also reached the semi-final of the FAI Cup. In 2014, Kenny guided Dundalk to the League title, winning the League of Ireland Cup in the process. Shields was an important member of that team and was an integral part of the club's success during the remainder of Kenny's time in charge. He was part of the group that made history in Europe in 2016, although they suffered disappointment the following year as Cork City won both the league and FAI Cup.

In 2018, Shields enjoyed the best season of his career and scored the decisive goal in their top of the table clash with Cork that helped them secure a fourth league win in the space of five years. His performances were recognized by his peers when he was voted onto the PFAI Team of the Year and shortlisted for the Player of the Year award which was collected by his team-mate Michael Duffy

In 2019, Shields scored the winning penalty in a shootout after a 2–2 draw with Derry City in the EA Sports Cup final.

In the 2020 Europa League third qualifying round, he scored in the penalty shoot-out against Sheriff Tiraspol helping Dundalk qualify for the playoffs. Dundalk went on to qualify for the 2020–21 UEFA Europa League group stage and he scored a goal from a penalty in Dundalk's 3–1 defeat against Rapid Vienna at the Aviva Stadium.

=== Linfield ===
On 22 June 2021, Shields joined NIFL Premiership side Linfield on a three-year contract from 1 July 2021. He scored his first goal in the 2021 Champions League qualifiers against Zalgiris Vilnius, but lost 3–1.

== Career statistics ==
As of match played 18 July 2024

Appearances and goals by club, season and competition
Club	Season	League			National Cup		League Cup		Europe		Other		Total	
Club	Season	Division	Apps	Goals	Apps	Goals	Apps	Goals	Apps	Goals	Apps	Goals	Apps	Goals
Bray Wanderers	2008	LOI Premier Division	1	0	0	0	0	0	—		—		1	0
Bray Wanderers	2009	LOI Premier Division	30	1	4	1	0	0	—		1 (Note: Appearances in League of Ireland promotion/relegation playoffs)	0	35	2
Bray Wanderers	2010	LOI Premier Division	30	1	4	0	2	1	—		5 (Note: 3 appearances in League of Ireland promotion/relegation playoffs & 2 appearances in Leinster Senior Cup)	0	41	2
Bray Wanderers	2011	LOI Premier Division	29	1	1	0	0	0	—		0 (Note: Appearances in Leinster Senior Cup)	0	30	1
Bray Wanderers	Total		90	3	9	1	2	1	—		6	0	106	5
Dundalk	2012	LOI Premier Division	26	2	4	0	2	0	—		2 (Note: Appearances in League of Ireland promotion/relegation playoffs)	0	34	2
Dundalk	2013	LOI Premier Division	19	1	2	0	0	0	—		0	0	21	1
Dundalk	2014	LOI Premier Division	28	0	4	0	2	0	3 (Note: Appearances in UEFA Europa League)	0	4 (Note: Appearances in Setanta Sports Cup)	1	41	1
Dundalk	2015	LOI Premier Division	30	0	5	0	0	0	2 (Note: Appearances in UEFA Champions League)	0	2 (Note: 1 appearance in President's Cup & 1 appearance in Leinster Senior Cup)	1	39	1
Dundalk	2016	LOI Premier Division	25	0	6	2	1	0	10 (Note: 5 appearances in UEFA Champions League & 5 appearances in UEFA Europa League)	0	3 (Note: 1 appearance in President's Cup & 2 appearances in Leinster Senior Cup)	0	45	2
Dundalk	2017	LOI Premier Division	26	0	5	0	3	0	2	0	0	0	36	0
Dundalk	2018	LOI Premier Division	33	3	2	0	0	0	4	0	1 (Note: Appearance in President's Cup)	0	40	3
Dundalk	2019	LOI Premier Division	29	0	3	0	3	0	6 (Note: 4 appearances in UEFA Champions League & 2 appearances in UEFA Europa League)	0	3 (Note: 1 appearance in President's Cup & 2 appearances in Champions Cup)	0	44	0
Dundalk	2020	LOI Premier Division	17	0	5	1	—		8 (Note: 1 appearance in UEFA Champions League & 7 appearances, 1 goal in UEFA Europa League)	1	—		30	2
Dundalk	2021	LOI Premier Division	16	3	—		—		—		1	0	17	3
Dundalk	Total		249	9	36	3	11	0	35	1	18	2	347	15
Linfield	2021–22	NIFL Premiership	33	6	0	0	1	0	5 (Note: 2 appearances, 1 goal in UEFA Champions League & 3 appearances in UEFA Europa Conference League)	1	1 (Note: Appearances in County Antrim Shield)	0	40	7
Linfield	2022–23	NIFL Premiership	35	6	2	0	3	1	7 (Note: 4 appearances in UEFA Champions League, 1 appearance in UEFA Europa League & 2 appearances in UEFA Europa Conference League)	0	5 (Note: 3 appearances & 1 goal in County Antrim Shield, 1 appearance in NIFL Charity Shield & 1 appearance in Scottish Challenge Cup)	1	52	8
Linfield	2023–24	NIFL Premiership	26	7	3	1	2	0	4 (Note: Appearances in UEFA Conference League)	0	1	0	36	8
Linfield	2024–25	NIFL Premiership	0	0	0	0	0	0	2	0	0	0	2	0
Linfield	Total		94	19	5	1	6	1	18	1	7	1	130	23
Career Total			433	31	50	5	19	2	53	2	31	3	587	43

== Honours ==
Dundalk

- League of Ireland Premier Division (5): 2014, 2015, 2016, 2018, 2019
- FAI Cup (3): 2015, 2018, 2020
- League of Ireland Cup (3): 2014, 2017, 2019
- President's Cup (3): 2015, 2019, 2021
- Leinster Senior Cup (1): 2014–15
- Champions Cup (1): 2019

Linfield

- NIFL Premiership (1): 2021–22

Individual

- PFAI Team of the Year (2): 2018, 2019
- FAI League Player of the Year (1): 2018
- NIFL Premiership Team of the Year (1): 2021–22
- Linfield Player of the Year (1): 2021–22
- Ulster Footballer of the Year (1): 2021–22
- NIFWA Player of the Year (1): 2021–22
