= Ronan Finn =

Irish professional footballer (born 1987)

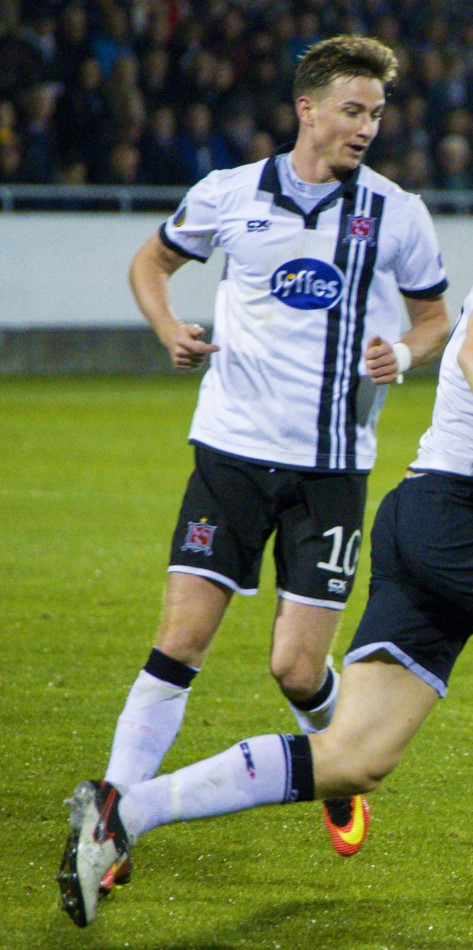
- Finn playing against Zenit Saint Petersburg in the 2016–17 Europa League

Personal information
- Full name: Ronan Michael Finn
- Date of birth: 21 December 1987 (age 38)
- Place of birth: Dublin, Ireland
- Height: 1.83 m (6 ft 0 in)
- Position: Midfielder

Team information
- Current team: UCD
- Number: 8

Youth career
- 2004–2005: Cambridge United

Senior career*
Years	Team	Apps	(Gls)
2005–2009	UCD	99	(10)
2010	Sporting Fingal	34	(8)
2011–2014	Shamrock Rovers	116	(27)
2015–2016	Dundalk	62	(13)
2017–2023	Shamrock Rovers	176	(19)
2024–	UCD	32	(0)

International career
2007	Republic of Ireland U21	1	(0)
2010	Republic of Ireland U23	1	(0)
- * Club domestic league appearances and goals as of 16:07, 15 September 2025 (UTC)

Ronan Finn (born 21 December 1987) is an Irish professional footballer who plays as a midfielder for League of Ireland First Division side UCD, where he is also club captain. Across a playing career spanning two decades, he has turned out for UCD (over 2 spells), Sporting Fingal, Dundalk and Shamrock Rovers (over 2 spells). Having made over 60 appearances in European competition, Finn competed in the group stages of the Europa League with both Shamrock Rovers (2011) and Dundalk (2016), and also the group stages of the Europa Conference League in 2022 with Shamrock Rovers.

== Club career ==
Finn began his youth career at Cambridge United, spending eight months with their youth team in 2004–05. Due to a requirement that he had to finish school in Ireland, he would fly from Dublin to Cambridge after school on Fridays, play a game on Saturday and fly straight back home. Finn scored on his FA Youth Cup debut in a 3–1 victory over Mansfield Town. As the demands to fly over became more frequent from Cambridge United youth manager Ricky Duncan, Finn decided to end his time with the club to instead focus on his education.

=== UCD ===
Finn was signed by UCD in 2005 and went straight into the under-21 team. He was a member of the side that won a second straight Dr. Tony O'Neill Under-21 League Championship, scoring the winning goal in the final against Shelbourne. His impressive displays earned him a call-up to the first-team squad towards the end of the season. He made his League of Ireland debut for UCD in a 1–0 defeat against Longford Town in November 2005. He made his home debut the following week on 18 November against Shamrock Rovers, again as a substitute, and also scored his first senior goal in this fixture.

Finn started the 2006 season back in the under-21s. He regularly began to make the match day squad at the beginning of June, making a couple of brief substitute appearances. However, he got his chance to impress when he was handed his first senior start away to Sligo Rovers in August and was named the man-of-the-match in this game. He became a regular name on U.C.D. manager Pete Mahon's teamsheet for the remainder of the season. Finn made his FAI Cup debut in the third round against Limerick and scored his first goals of the season in this game, scoring twice in a 3–1 win. His displays did not go unnoticed, and he was nominated for the PFAI Young Player of the Year award and also won the UCD Supporters' New Player of the Yea.

Finn secured his place as a regular in centre midfield in 2007. He forged a partnership with fellow Irish under-21 international Shane McFaul, which helping UCD reach the semi-finals of both the League and FAI Cups.

With the retirement of Tony McDonnell and the departure of Shane McFaul in 2008, Finn became one of the most experienced central midfielders at the club and formed a new partnership with Alan McNally in the centre. He began the 2008 season in good form in the opening games against Derry City and Bray Wanderers. However, UCD struggled as the season went on and was eventually relegated after finishing bottom of the Premier Division.

Following relegation, UCD lost almost all of its first-team squad but Finn decided to remain to complete his degree in Sports Management at the university. Finn was handed the captaincy of this squad by Martin Russell who led them to promotion and the 2009 First Division title. He was subsequently named the PFAI First Division Player of the Year for 2009.

=== Sporting Fingal ===
Finn departed UCD after five seasons to join Sporting Fingal on 8 December 2009. He represented the club in the 2010–11 UEFA Europa League qualifying second round against Maritimo.

On 10 February 2011 the directors of Sporting Fingal confirmed that the club withdrew its application for a licence from the FAI to participate in the 2011 Airtricity League season. This decision was made after funding targets integral to the club's continued existence were not reached during the off-season. After their demise, Finn became a free agent.

=== Shamrock Rovers ===
Following the demise of Sporting Fingal, Finn signed for Shamrock Rovers on a two-year deal in February 2011

He made his League debut for the club in the opening night win over Dundalk and helped them win the Setanta Sports Cup by beating Dundalk 2–0 in the final.

In his first season at the club, Finn won the League of Ireland Premier Division and was also a member of the first Irish team to reach the group stage of European competition, as they went on to reach the 2011–12 UEFA Europa League group stages.

=== Dundalk ===
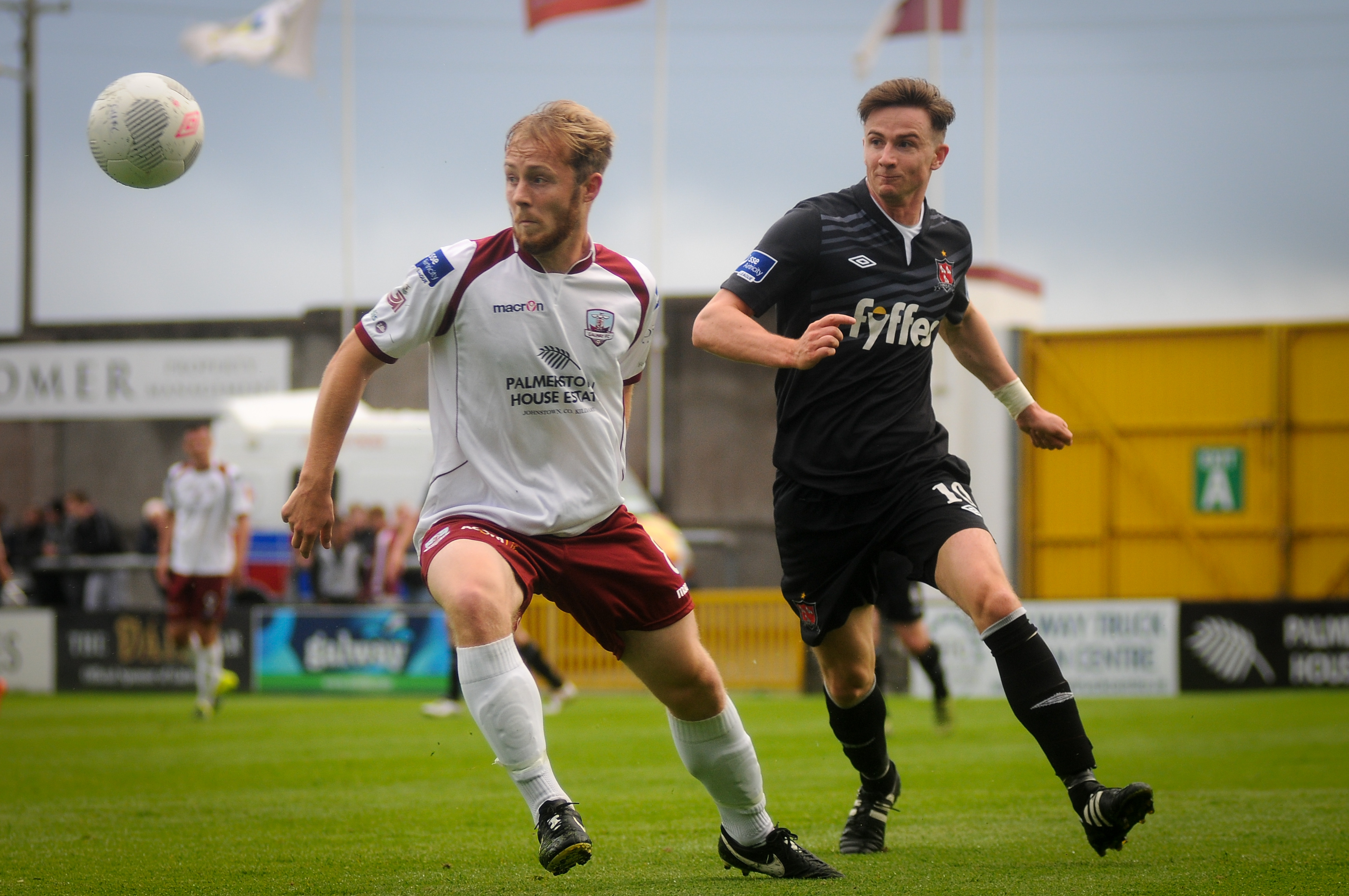
Finn in action for Dundalk away to Galway United in 2015.

In December 2014, Finn signed a two-year deal with Dundalk, linking up with his former boss at Shamrock Rovers, Stephen Kenny. He won the league and cup double at the club in 2015. Following the departure of Richie Towell in December 2015, Finn was played in a more advanced position. His form in this role and a hat-trick against Longford Town on 9 April led to him being named the SWAI League of Ireland Premier Division Player of the Month for the first time in his career in April 2016. Finn played in all 6 of Dundalk's UEFA Champions League qualifying matches as they reached the play-off stage.

=== Shamrock Rovers return ===
In December 2016, Finn returned to Shamrock Rovers. On 31 March 2017, he scored his first league goal since his return to the club, in a 3–2 win against Finn Harps at Tallaght Stadium.

Finn holds the record for the most European appearances by a League of Ireland player (63)

He scored his only European goal against Hibernians F.C. in a 2022–23 UEFA Champions League qualifier

=== Return to UCD ===
On 2 November 2023, Finn announced that he would be returning to his first senior club UCD, despite an offer of a contract extension from Shamrock Rovers, in order to combine football with a two-year masters' course in sports management at the university.

== International career ==
Finn was called up to the Republic of Ireland U21 squad for the first time in early 2007, for the annual Madeira Cup tournament. He won his first cap when he came on as a half-time substitute against Madeira. In May 2010, Finn made his Republic of Ireland U23 debut against England C in the 2009–11 International Challenge Trophy game at the Waterford Regional Sports Centre.

== Personal life ==
Finn has a degree in Sports Management from University College Dublin.

== Career statistics ==
As of match played on 12 September 2025

Appearances and goals by club, season and competition
Club	Season	League			FAI Cup		League Cup		Europe		Other		Total	
Club	Season	Division	Apps	Goals	Apps	Goals	Apps	Goals	Apps	Goals	Apps	Goals	Apps	Goals
UCD	2005	LOI Premier Division	2	1	0	0	0	0	—		—		2	1
UCD	2006	LOI Premier Division	14	0	1	2	0	0	—		—		15	2
UCD	2007	LOI Premier Division	23	0	3	0	1	0	—		—		27	0
UCD	2008	LOI Premier Division	30	2	2	0	0	0	—		—		32	2
UCD	2009	LOI First Division	30	7	0	0	2	1	—		—		32	8
UCD	Total		99	10	6	2	3	1	—		—		108	13
Sporting Fingal	2010	LOI Premier Division	34	8	5	1	0	0	2 (Note: Appearance(s) in the UEFA Europa League)	0	0	0	41	9
Shamrock Rovers	2011	LOI Premier Division	33	5	3	0	0	0	11 (Note: 4 appearances in the UEFA Champions League; 7 appearances in the UEFA Europa League)	0	4 (Note: Appearance(s) in the Setanta Sports Cup)	1	51	6
Shamrock Rovers	2012	LOI Premier Division	26	8	2	0	2	0	2 (Note: Appearance(s) in the UEFA Champions League)	0	3	0	35	8
Shamrock Rovers	2013	LOI Premier Division	29	8	4	1	4	0	—		6	3	43	12
Shamrock Rovers	2014	LOI Premier Division	28	6	5	0	4	1	—		3 (Note: 1 appearance in the Leinster Senior Cup; 2 appearances in the Setanta Sports Cup)	0	40	7
Shamrock Rovers	Total		116	27	14	1	10	1	13	0	16	4	123	17
Dundalk	2015	LOI Premier Division	33	5	5	3	1	0	2	0	2 (Note: 1 appearance in the President of Ireland's Cup; 1 appearance & 1 goal in the Leinster Senior Cup)	1	43	9
Dundalk	2016	LOI Premier Division	29	8	3	1	0	0	12 (Note: 6 appearances in the UEFA Champions League; 6 appearances in the UEFA Europa League)	0	2 (Note: 1 appearance in the President of Ireland's Cup; 1 appearance in the Leinster Senior Cup)	0	46	9
Dundalk	Total		62	13	8	4	1	0	14	0	4	1	89	18
Shamrock Rovers	2017	LOI Premier Division	31	6	4	1	3	0	4	0	0	0	38	7
Shamrock Rovers	2018	LOI Premier Division	33	7	1	0	0	0	2	0	0	0	36	7
Shamrock Rovers	2019	LOI Premier Division	30	3	5	0	0	0	4	0	0	0	35	3
Shamrock Rovers	2020	LOI Premier Division	17	1	4	0	—		2	0	—		23	1
Shamrock Rovers	2021	LOI Premier Division	25	1	1	0	—		6 (Note: 2 appearances in the UEFA Champions League; 4 appearances in the UEFA Europa Conference League)	0	1 (Note: Appearance in the President of Ireland's Cup)	0	33	1
Shamrock Rovers	2022	LOI Premier Division	23	0	2	0	—		12 (Note: 4 appearances & 1 goal in the UEFA Champions League; 3 appearances in the UEFA Europa League; 5 appearances in the UEFA Europa Conference League)	1	1	1	38	2
Shamrock Rovers	2023	LOI Premier Division	17	1	0	0	—		4 (Note: 2 appearances in the UEFA Champions League; 2 appearances in the UEFA Europa Conference League)	0	0	0	21	1
Shamrock Rovers	Total		176	19	17	1	3	0	34	1	2	1	232	22
UCD	2024	LOI First Division	15	0	3	0	—		—		5 (Note: 3 appearances in the Leinster Senior Cup; 2 appearances & 1 goal in the 2024 League of Ireland First Division Promotion Playoffs)	1	23	1
UCD	2025	LOI First Division	17	0	0	0	—		—		2 (Note: Appearance(s) in the Leinster Senior Cup)	1	19	1
UCD	Total		32	0	3	0	—		—		7	2	42	2
Career total			519	77	53	9	17	2	63	1	29	8	681	97

== Honours ==
League of Ireland, Premier Division winner

7 times

- 2011 (Shamrock Rovers)
- 2015, 2016 (Dundalk)
- 2020, 2021, 2022, 2023 (Shamrock Rovers).

FAI Cup Winner

3 times

- 2009 (Sporting Fingal)
- 2015 (Dundalk)
- 2019 (Shamrock Rovers)

Individual

- League of Ireland Premier Division Player of the Month: April 2016
