= Kurtis Byrne =

Irish footballer (born 1990)

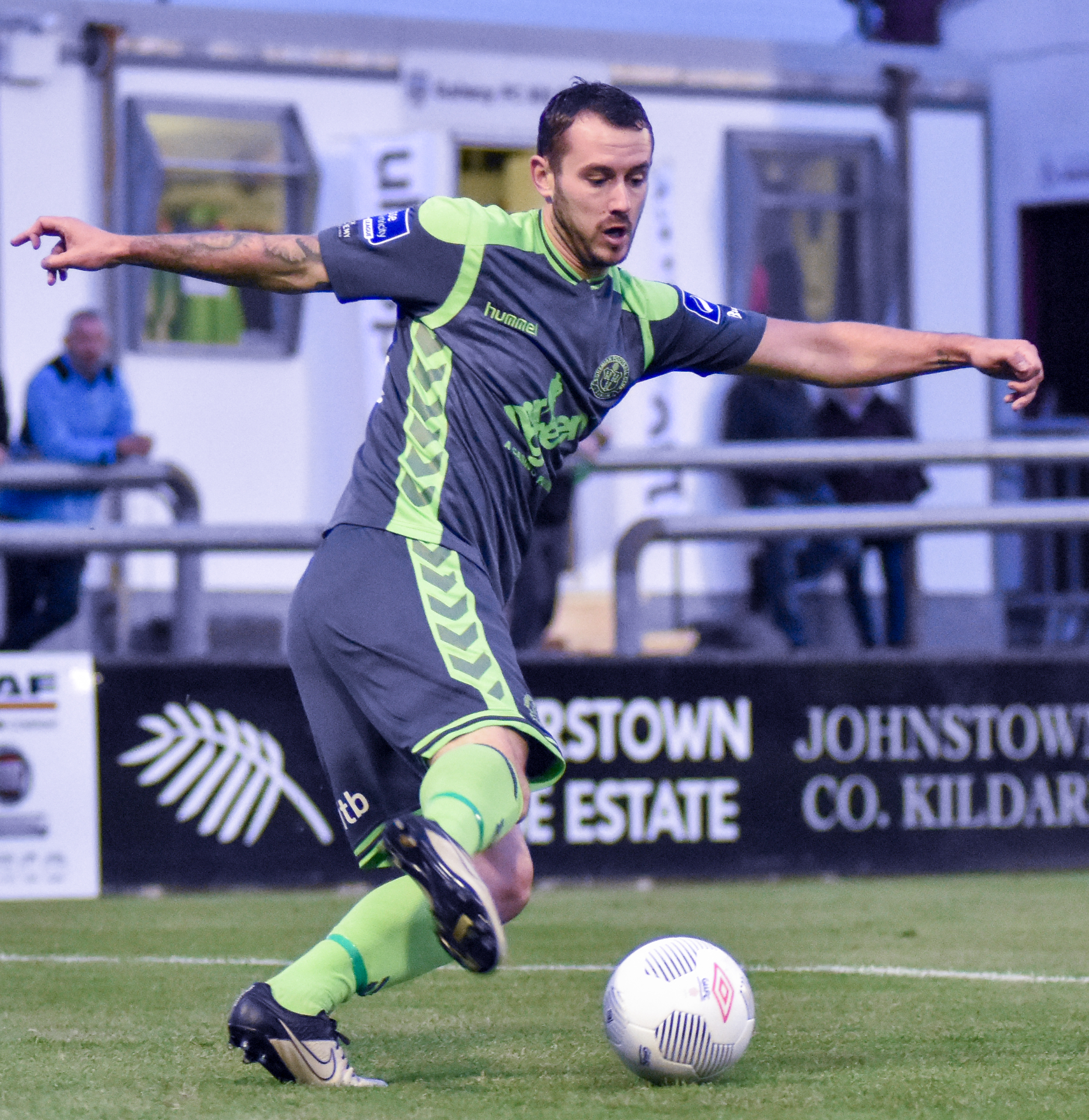
- Byrne with Bohemians in 2016

Personal information
- Date of birth: 9 April 1990 (age 36)
- Place of birth: Dublin, Ireland
- Height: 6 ft 0 in (1.83 m)
- Position: Forward

Team information
- Current team: Bluebell United

Youth career
- 2006–2007: Norwich City
- 2007–2009: Hibernian

Senior career*
Years	Team	Apps	(Gls)
2009–2011	Hibernian	7	(0)
2010	→ Stirling Albion (loan)	3	(0)
2010	→ East Fife (loan)	14	(7)
2011	→ Alloa Athletic (loan)	6	(0)
2011–2012	Ross County	13	(2)
2012	→ Brechin City (loan)	10	(2)
2013–2015	Dundalk	75	(14)
2016	Bohemians	32	(10)
2017	St Patrick's Athletic	30	(10)
2018	Linfield	17	(6)
2018–2020	The New Saints	51	(17)
2020	Waterford	13	(1)
2021	Athlone Town	26	(6)
2022	Bray Wanderers	18	(5)
2022–2023	Bluebell United		
2023–	Collinstown FC		

International career
- Republic of Ireland U17
- * Club domestic league appearances and goals as of 10:28, 8 December 2022 (UTC)

Kurtis Byrne (born 9 April 1990) is an Irish former professional footballer who plays for Belgard AFC. He is the son of former Celtic and Southend United player Paul Byrne.

== Career ==
=== Hibernian ===
Byrne was a member of the Hibernian under-19 side that won the league and cup double in the 2008–09 season. He scored the winning goal in both the decisive league match and the Youth Cup Final. Byrne was one of seven players in that side who were given professional contracts by Hibs following their success.

Byrne made his professional debut on 26 August 2009 in the Scottish League Cup against Brechin City, and made his league debut the following Sunday against Celtic.

==== Stirling Albion (loan) ====
Byrne was loaned to Stirling Albion for a month in February 2010.

==== East Fife (loan) ====
Byrne was then loaned to East Fife for the first half of the 2010–11 season. Byrne scored a hat-trick for East Fife in his fourth appearance for the club, a 6–0 win against Dumbarton.

After Hibs suffered from a striker shortage due to the sale of Anthony Stokes and an injury to Darryl Duffy, manager John Hughes commented that Byrne was not yet ready to play regularly in the SPL, and needed to "learn his trade" in lower division football.

==== Alloa Athletic (loan) ====
Byrne was loaned to Alloa Athletic on 31 March 2011 for the rest of the 2010–11 season. Hibs announced in late April that Byrne would be released at the end of the season.

=== Ross County ===
Byrne then signed for Ross County on a one-year contract. He helped the club win the 2011–12 Scottish First Division and promotion to the SPL.

==== Brechin City (loan) ====
Byrne was loaned to Brechin City in September 2012, and was then released by Ross County in December 2012.

=== Dundalk ===
Byrne signed for Dundalk in January 2013.

=== Bohemians ===
Byrne signed for Bohemians in November 2015, the club his father spent most of his career at.

=== St Patrick's Athletic ===
He signed for another of his father's old clubs, St Patrick's Athletic on 9 January 2017.

=== Linfield ===
He then signed for NIFL Premiership side Linfield.

=== The New Saints ===
In June 2018 he joined The New Saints of the Welsh Premier League citing a desire to return to full-time football.

=== Waterford ===
Following the conclusion of the 2019-20 Welsh Premier League, Kurtis returned to the League of Ireland and signed with Premier Division club Waterford.

=== Retirement ===
After a season at Athlone Town in 2021 and Bray Wanderers in 2022, Byrne announced his retirement from professional football in September 2022.

== Honours ==
Stirling Albion

- Scottish League One (1): 2009–10

Ross County

- Scottish Championship (1): 2011–12

Dundalk

- League of Ireland (2): 2014, 2015
- FAI Cup (1): 2015
- League Cup (1): 2014
- President's Cup (1): 2015
- Leinster Senior Cup (1): 2015

Bohemians

- Leinster Senior Cup (1): 2016

The New Saints

- Welsh Premier League (1): 2018–19
- Welsh Cup (1): 2018–19

== Career statistics ==
As of 8 December 2022

Club statistics
Club	Season	League			National Cup (Note: Includes Scottish Cup, FAI Cup, Irish Cup & Welsh Cup)		League Cup (Note: Includes Scottish League Cup, League of Ireland Cup & Welsh League Cup)		Europe		Other		Total	
Club	Season	Division	Apps	Goals	Apps	Goals	Apps	Goals	Apps	Goals	Apps	Goals	Apps	Goals
Hibernian	2009–10	Scottish Premiership	4	0	0	0	1	0	—		—		5	0
Stirling Albion (loan)	2009–10	Scottish League One	3	0	0	0	0	0	—		0 (Note: Appearances in Scottish Challenge Cup)	0	3	0
East Fife (loan)	2010–11	Scottish League One	14	7	0	0	1	0	—		2	0	17	7
Hibernian	2010–11	Scottish Premiership	3	0	0	0	0	0	0 (Note: Appearances in UEFA Europa League)	0	—		3	0
Hibernian	Hibernian Total		7	0	0	0	1	0	0	0	—		8	0
Alloa Athletic (loan)	2010–11	Scottish League One	6	0	0	0	0	0	—		0	0	6	0
Ross County	2011–12	Scottish Championship	13	2	4	2	3	0	—		1	0	21	4
Ross County	2012–13	Scottish Premiership	0	0	0	0	1	0	—		—		1	0
Ross County	Ross County Total		13	2	4	2	4	0	—		1	0	22	4
Brechin City	2012–13	Scottish League One	10	2	3	1	0	0	—		0	0	13	3
Dundalk	2013	League of Ireland Premier Division	30	7	4	4	2	1	—		1 (Note: Appearances in Leinster Senior Cup)	1	37	13
Dundalk	2014	League of Ireland Premier Division	31	7	3	0	2	1	3	2	5 (Note: 4 appearances in Setanta Sports Cup, 1 appearance in Leinster Senior Cup)	0	44	10
Dundalk	2015	League of Ireland Premier Division	14	0	2	1	3	1	2 (Note: Appearances in UEFA Champions League)	0	5 (Note: 1 appearance in President of Ireland's Cup, 4 appearances 2 goals in Leinster Senior Cup)	2	24	4
Dundalk	Dundalk Total		75	14	9	5	7	3	5	2	10	2	105	27
Bohemians	2016	League of Ireland Premier Division	32	10	0	0	1	0	—		4	6	37	16
St Patrick's Athletic	2017	League of Ireland Premier Division	30	10	2	0	1	0	—		3	0	36	10
Linfield	2017–18	NIFL Premiership	17	6	3	0	—		—		1 (Note: Appearances in NIFL UEFA Europa League play-offs)	0	21	6
The New Saints	2018–19	Welsh Premier League	30	12	2	0	2	1	5 (Note: 2 appearances in UEFA Champions League & 3 appearances, 1 goal in UEFA Europa League)	1	1	0	40	14
The New Saints	2019–20	Welsh Premier League	21	5	2	1	2	1	2 (Note: 1 appearance in UEFA Champions League & 1 appearance in UEFA Europa League)	0	1	0	28	7
The New Saints	The New Saints Total		51	17	4	1	4	2	7	1	2	0	68	21
Waterford	2020	League of Ireland Premier Division	13	1	1	0	—		—		—		14	1
Athlone Town	2021	League of Ireland First Division	26	6	0	0	—		—		—		26	6
Bray Wanderers	2022	League of Ireland First Division	18	5	1	0	—		—		—		19	5
Career total			315	80	27	9	19	5	12	3	24	9	397	106
