= Brian Gartland =

Irish footballer

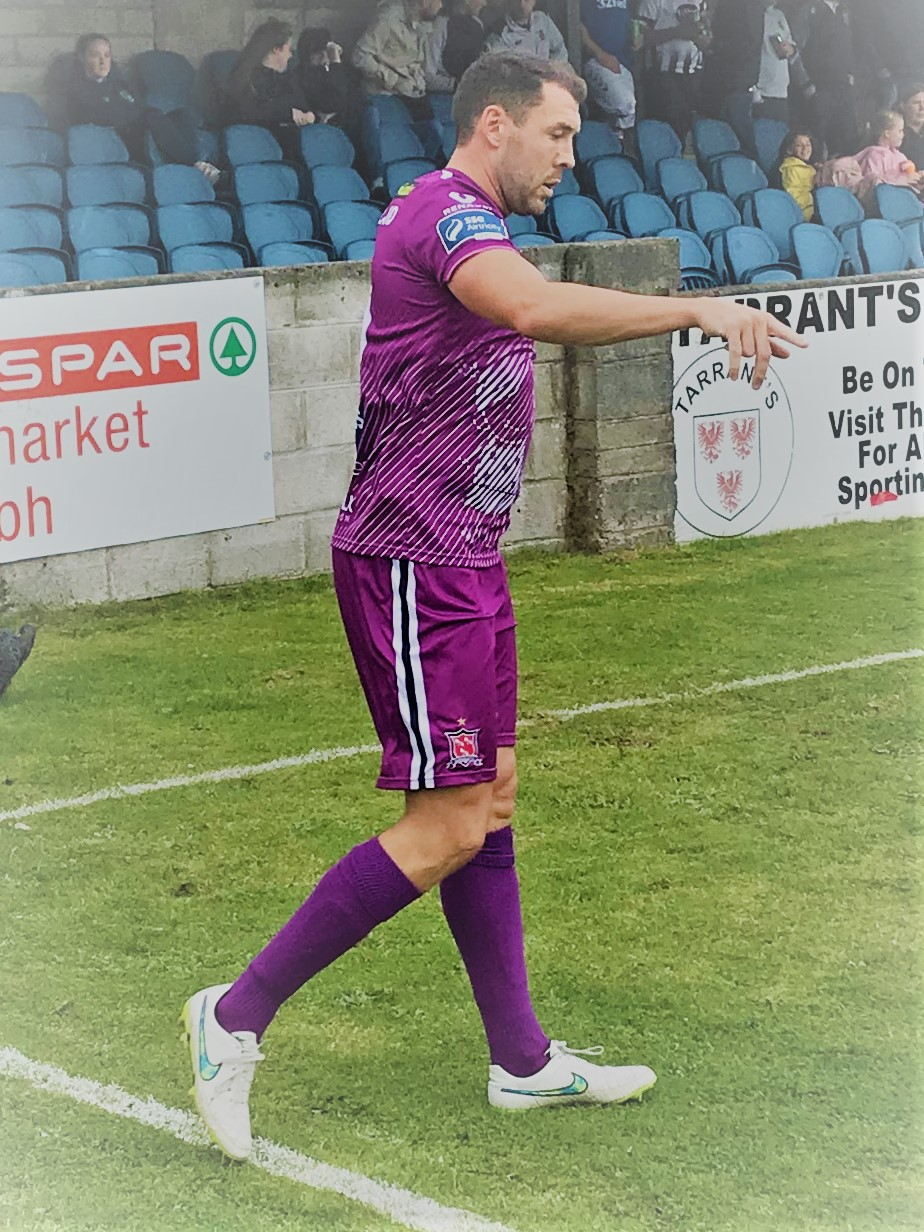
- Gartland in 2019

Personal information
- Full name: Brian Gartland
- Date of birth: 4 November 1986 (age 39)
- Place of birth: Dublin, Ireland
- Position: Centre back

Team information
- Current team: St Patrick's Athletic (assistant)

Senior career*
Years	Team	Apps	(Gls)
2005–2006	Bray Wanderers	0	(0)
2007	Shelbourne	15	(1)
2008–2010	Monaghan United	79	(6)
2011–2013	Portadown	77	(7)
2013–2022	Dundalk	178	(31)

Managerial career
- 2023–2024: Dundalk (Head of Football Operations)
- 2024: Dundalk (co-interim)
- 2024–: St Patrick's Athletic (assistant)
- * Club domestic league appearances and goals as of 10 June 2024

Brian Gartland (born 4 November 1986) is an Irish former professional footballer who played as a centre-back. He is currently an assistant coach at St Patrick's Athletic, working under Stephen Kenny.

== Playing career ==
A native of Knocklyon, County Dublin, Gartland began his senior career at Bray Wanderers in 2005 and won their U21 Player of the Year the following year, before moving to Shelbourne at the start of 2007. Brian scored on his League of Ireland debut on the opening day of the 2007 League of Ireland season and after one season at Tolka Park moved to Monaghan United in 2008, where he won the 2009 Supporters Club Player of the Year. In January 2011 he moved north of the border for a 2 1/2-year spell with Portadown in the Irish League.

Brian Gartland joined Dundalk during the July transfer window in 2013 having left Irish League side Portadown. Dundalk manager Stephen Kenny had moved to add Gartland to his squad to strengthen his centre-half options.

Gartland made his Dundalk debut when entering as an early second-half substitute in the 3–0 win at home to Bohemians on 12 July 2013. On his first full start, Brian scored his first goal for Dundalk against Cork on 19 July 2013 in Turners Cross. During the second half of the 2013 season, he formed a formidable partnership with Andy Boyle at the heart of the defence, and was a key player in Dundalk's title challenge – playing 12 matches and scoring twice.

On 18 October 2013, Gartland signed a fresh one-year deal to keep him at Oriel Park for the 2014 season. In his first full season at the club, he scored 11 goals on the way to helping the side clinch the League title. He agreed on a new two-year deal in November 2014 and in 2015 he was a key member of the side that claimed the Double. During the 2014–15 UEFA Europa League Gartland scored against Jeunesse Esch

Gartland remained near ever present in the side for Dundalk's three-in-a-row League title success in 2016 and signed a new deal to stay at the club at the end of the 2017 season. Having been made club captain in 2018 after injury to Stephen O'Donnell, Gartland lifted both the League title and the FAI Cup that season, as the club completed its second Double in four seasons.

Gartland was part of the first Irish side to reach the play-off round of the UEFA Champions League in August 2016 and qualified for the Europa League group stages. Gartland scored against Rosenborg BK in the 2017–18 UEFA Champions League

He also played regularly in the 2020–21 UEFA Europa League group stage. Gartland picked up a serious injury to his Anterior cruciate ligament on 2 April 2021, 6 minutes into his first league appearance of the season, against Shamrock Rovers at Tallaght Stadium.

== Post-playing career ==
After retiring from playing at the end of the 2022 season with Dundalk, Gartland remained with the club in the role of Head of Football Operations from January 2023 until he was sacked in May 2024. During his spell as Head of Football Operations, from April–May 2024, after the sacking of Stephen O'Donnell, he acted as co-interim manager of the first-team alongside Liam Burns. In January 2025, Gartland was awarded a sum of €64,434 compensation by Dundalk after a successful unfair dismissal claim in the Workplace Relations Commission.

On 10 June 2024, it was announced that he had been appointed as an assistant coach at St Patrick's Athletic, under his former manager Stephen Kenny.

== Honours ==
Dundalk

- Premier Division: 5
  - 2014, 2015, 2016, 2018, 2019
- FAI Cup: 3
  - 2015, 2018, 2020
- League of Ireland Cup: 3
  - 2014, 2017, 2019
- President's Cup: 3
  - 2015, 2019, 2021
- Champions Cup: 1
  - 2019
- Leinster Senior Cup: 1
  - 2014–15
