= John Mountney =

Irish footballer

Personal information
- Date of birth: 22 February 1993 (age 33)
- Place of birth: Bohola, County Mayo, Ireland
- Positions: Midfielder; right back

Team information
- Current team: Glenavon
- Number: 32

Youth career
- Kiltimagh/Knock United
- Ballina Town

Senior career*
Years	Team	Apps	(Gls)
2011	Mervue United	20	(1)
2012–2020	Dundalk	200	(20)
2021	St Patrick's Athletic	20	(1)
2022–2024	Dundalk	38	(2)
2025	Bohemians	19	(0)
2026–	Glenavon	12	(0)

International career
2010	Republic of Ireland U18	2	(0)
- * Club domestic league appearances and goals as of 12:07, 9 September 2026 (UTC)

John Mountney (born 22 February 1993) is an Irish professional footballer who plays as a defender, for NIFL Championship club Glenavon.

== Club career ==
=== Early career ===
Having grown up in Bohola, County Mayo, Mountney began playing with Kiltimagh/Knock United and Ballina Town, during which time he was capped at U16 and U18 level. While at Ballina, he was selected in Sean McCaffrey's final international squad in August 2010, as he was chosen for the Jezek International Tournament in Czech Republic. There, Mountney came on for the second half of a 2–0 defeat by the host nation, before he played the full game against Ukraine where the Irish fell to a 3–0 loss.

Earlier that month, he scored an injury-time winner for Ballina against Westport United which was crucial in ensuring the Super League title. His performances in the latter part of the campaign earned him a place on the Team of the Year.

After being watched by Charlton Athletic and Burnley, Mountney joined Mervue United ahead of the 2011 League of Ireland First Division. He made his league debut when coming on as a second-half substitute against Athlone Town at the Athlone Town Stadium on 22 April 2011. Just six days after making his league debut, Mountney played for the Irish Schools U18s against England in the Centenary Shield and scored with a long-range strike that made the game 2-2.

In total, Mountney made 20 league appearances for Mervue United, including 17 starts, as the Galway club enjoyed their best season since entering the league in 2009, with a seventh-placed finish. It was these performances which attracted the attention of managers in the Premier Division and he joined Dundalk in January 2012.

=== Dundalk ===
Mountney made his Dundalk debut in a scoreless draw against Monaghan United at Gortakeegan on 2 March 2012. In the FAI Cup on 25 May 2012, the midfielder scored his first club goal with the decisive strike in a 1–0 win over St Patrick's CY at Oriel Park.

Despite the overall poor performance of the team during the 2012 season, Mountney was one of the better players and earned a contract with Stephen Kenny for the 2013 season. He scored his first league goal for the club at the 30th attempt with the third in a 3–1 win away to Shelbourne on 15 March 2013. His 50th competitive appearance came in the 1–0 win over Sligo Rovers at The Showgrounds on 28 May 2013.

Despite a number of injury problems, Mountney featured in 23 matches in 2013 and found the net on two occasions, helping Dundalk secure second place in the League. He penned new deals committing himself to the club for both the 2014 and 2015 seasons. Playing more games than anyone else in 2015, he added a League and FAI Cup Double to the League and League Cup medals won in 2014. In October 2015, Mountney signed a new contract for the 2016 campaign.

Mountney remained a key member of the side for Dundalk's three-in-a-row League title success in 2016 and, despite some injury setbacks, won more honours as Dundalk won both the League title and the FAI Cup in 2018 – the club completing its second Double in four seasons. Mountney signed a two-year contract extension at the end of the 2018 season. On 21 December, it was announced that Mountney had departed Dundalk after nine seasons at the club.

=== St Patrick's Athletic ===
On 7 January 2021, it was announced that Mountney had signed for Dublin club St Patrick's Athletic, managed by his former Dundalk captain Stephen O'Donnell. After signing for the club, O'Donnell asked Mountney to tell his new teammates how they were regarded by a title-winning team (Mountney's Dundalk team) as a motivational tactic. He made his debut for the club in the opening game of the season, playing at right back in a 1–1 draw away to Shamrock Rovers in a Dublin derby on 19 March 2021. He scored his first goal for the Saints on 30 July 2021 with a deflected free kick from 30 yards away to Shamrock Rovers in what was his 350th career appearance. Mountney suffered a cruciate ligament injury in a 4–1 win away to his old club Dundalk on 8 August 2021, an injury that put him out for the rest of the season. On 28 November 2021 his club won the 2021 FAI Cup Final, beating rivals Bohemians 4–3 on penalties following a 1–1 draw after extra time in front of a record FAI Cup Final crowd of 37,126 at the Aviva Stadium with Mountney missing out through injury but receiving a medal following his appearance in the first round of the tournament.

=== Return to Dundalk ===
On 24 December 2021, it was announced that Mountney had followed head coach Stephen O'Donnell back to Dundalk for a second spell at the club. After an injury blighted 3 seasons at the club, on 25 November 2024 Mountney announced that he would be leaving the club, following their relegation to the League of Ireland First Division.

=== Bohemians ===
On 26 November 2024, Mountney signed for League of Ireland Premier Division club Bohemians on a multi-year contract. He made 21 appearances in all competitions during his season with Bohs, before it was announced on 4 November 2025 that he had departed the club.

=== Glenavon ===
On 16 January 2026, Mountney signed for NIFL Premiership outfit Glenavon.

== Career statistics ==
As of match played on 8 August 2026

Appearances and goals by club, season and competition
Club	Season	League			National Cup		League Cup		Europe		Other		Total	
Club	Season	Division	Apps	Goals	Apps	Goals	Apps	Goals	Apps	Goals	Apps	Goals	Apps	Goals
Mervue United	2011	LOI First Division	20	1	1	0	2	0	—		—		23	1
Dundalk	2012	LOI Premier Division	28	0	4	1	2	0	—		2 (Note: 1 appearance in the Leinster Senior Cup & 1 appearance in the League of Ireland Promotion/relegation playoffs)	0	36	1
Dundalk	2013	LOI Premier Division	20	2	3	0	2	0	—		1 (Note: Appearances in the Leinster Senior Cup)	0	26	2
Dundalk	2014	LOI Premier Division	21	2	4	1	3	0	3 (Note: Appearances in the UEFA Europa League)	1	6 (Note: 5 appearances in the Setanta Sports Cup & 1 appearance in Leinster Senior Cup)	0	37	4
Dundalk	2015	LOI Premier Division	33	3	5	0	3	1	2 (Note: Appearances in the UEFA Champions League)	0	5 (Note: 4 appearances in the Leinster Senior Cup & 1 appearance in the President's Cup)	0	48	4
Dundalk	2016	LOI Premier Division	30	2	3	0	1	0	10 (Note: 5 appearances in the UEFA Champions League & 5 appearances in the UEFA Europa League)	0	2 (Note: 1 appearance in the Leinster Senior Cup & 1 appearance in the President's Cup)	0	46	2
Dundalk	2017	LOI Premier Division	16	1	2	2	3	0	2	0	2 (Note: 1 appearance in the Leinster Senior Cup & 1 appearance in the President's Cup)	0	23	3
Dundalk	2018	LOI Premier Division	18	4	4	1	3	0	1	0	2 (Note: Appearances in Leinster Senior Cup)	0	28	5
Dundalk	2019	LOI Premier Division	23	6	3	0	3	1	6 (Note: 4 appearances in the UEFA Champions League & 2 appearances in the UEFA Europa League)	0	3 (Note: 1 Appearance in the President's Cup & 2 appearances in the Champion's Cup)	1	38	7
Dundalk	2020	LOI Premier Division	11	0	5	1	—		7	0	—		23	1
Dundalk	Total		200	20	33	6	20	2	31	1	23	1	307	30
St Patrick's Athletic	2021	LOI Premier Division	20	1	1	0	—		—		—		21	1
Dundalk	2022	LOI Premier Division	10	0	3	0	—		—		—		13	0
Dundalk	2023	LOI Premier Division	0	0	0	0	—		0	0	0	0	0	0
Dundalk	2024	LOI Premier Division	28	2	1	0	—		—		0	0	29	2
Dundalk	Total		38	2	4	0	—		0	0	0	0	42	2
Bohemians	2025	LOI Premier Division	19	0	1	0	—		—		1	0	21	0
Glenavon	2025–26	NIFL Premiership	11	0	1	0	—		—		—		12	0
Glenavon	2026–27	NIFL Championship	1	0	0	0	0	0	—		0	0	1	0
Glenavon	Total		12	0	1	0	0	0	—		0	0	13	0
Career total			309	24	41	6	22	2	31	1	24	1	427	34

== Honours ==
Dundalk

- Premier Division: 5
  - 2014, 2015, 2016, 2018, 2019
- FAI Cup: 3
  - 2015, 2018, 2020
- League of Ireland Cup: 3
  - 2014, 2017, 2019
- Leinster Senior Cup: 1
  - 2015
- President's Cup: 2
  - 2015, 2019
- Champion's Cup: 1
  - 2019

St Patrick's Athletic

- FAI Cup: 1
  - 2021
