= 2015 President of Ireland's Cup =

- Event: President's Cup
Dundalk	St Patrick's Athletic
2	1
- Date: 28 February 2015
- Venue: Oriel Park, Dundalk
- Referee: Tomas Connolly
- Attendance: 1,800 (estimate)

The 2015 President's Cup was the second President's Cup contested for. The match was played between 2014 League of Ireland champions Dundalk and 2014 FAI Cup winners, St Patrick's Athletic on 28 February 2015, at Oriel Park. Dundalk came from behind to win the game 2-1.

Christopher Forrester put St Patrick's Athletic ahead in the 35th minute when he turned in a low cross from the right from close range. Daryl Horgan made it 1-1 a minute later when he scored with a shot from just outside the box with his right foot. Richie Towell got the winner for Dundalk a minute later turning in a cross from the left which wrong footed the goalkeeper.

== Match ==
28 February 2015
TBC GMT

Dundalk	2–1	St Patrick's Athletic
Horgan 36'; Towell 38'	Report	Forrester 35'

Oriel Park
Attendance: 1,800 (estimate)
Referee: Tomas Connolly

Dundalk	St Patrick's Athletic

== See also ==
- 2015 FAI Cup
- 2015 League of Ireland
