= History of Dundalk F.C. =

Dundalk
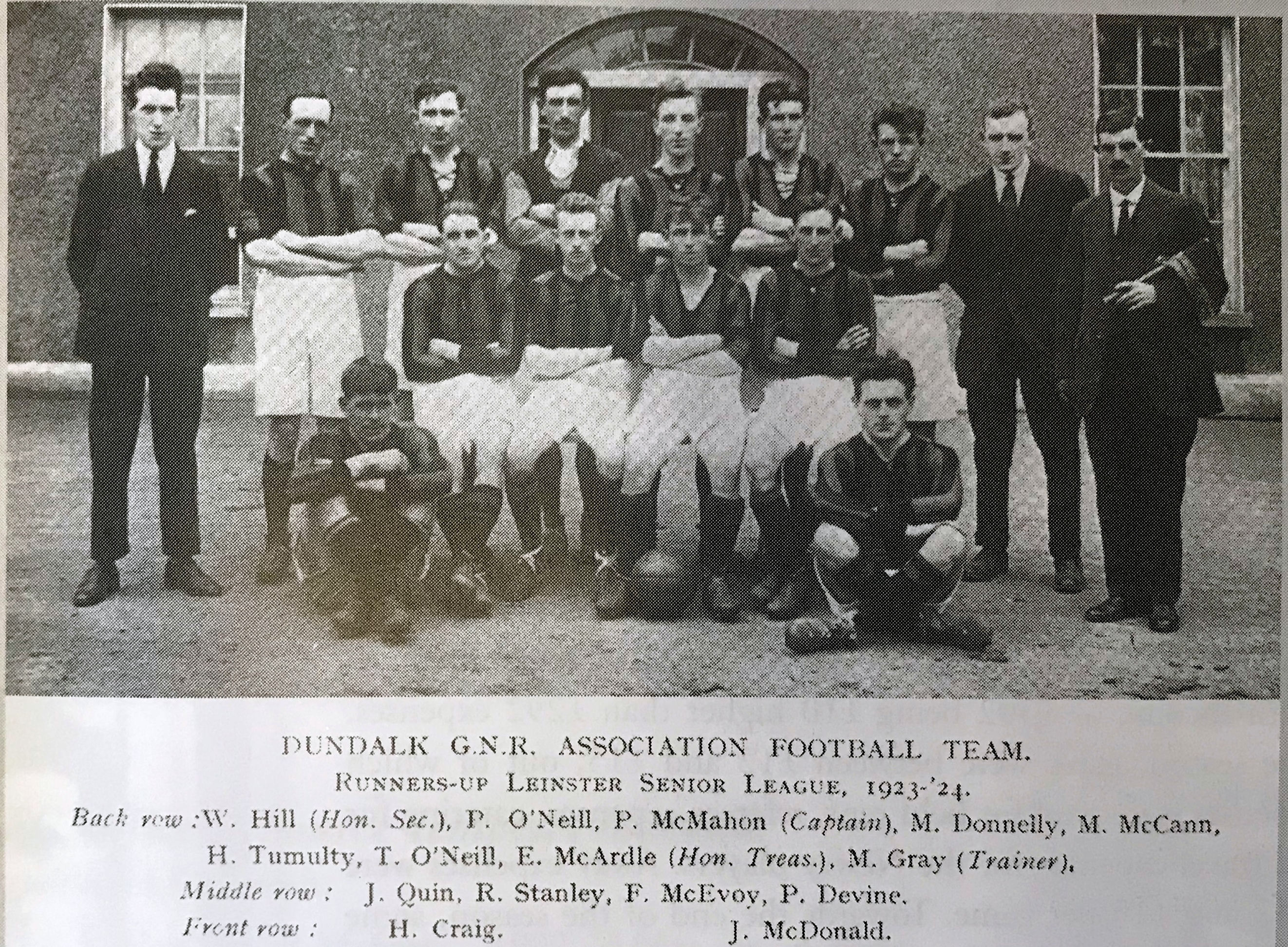
- Founded: September 1903; 122 years ago as Dundalk G.N.R. Association Club
- League: League of Ireland Premier Division

The History of Dundalk Football Club is divided into three periods, and covered by the following three articles:

- History of Dundalk F.C. (1903–1965) briefly describes the introduction of association football to the town of Dundalk, Ireland in the pre-World War I period, then subsequently covers the period from the formation of the Dundalk G.N.R. Association Club in September 1903 to the takeover of the club as a public limited company in January 1966.
- History of Dundalk F.C. (1966–2002) covers the period from the takeover of the club as a public limited company in January 1966 to the end of the 2001–02 season, when Dundalk won the FAI Cup, but were also relegated to the League of Ireland First Division.
- History of Dundalk F.C. (2002–present) covers the period from the club's relegation at the end of the 2001–02 season to the end of the most recently completed season.

These articles include short pieces about events and people that were an integral part of the club's history.

- Dundalk F.C. in European football covers the club's performances in European competition from making their debut as League Champions in the 1963–64 European Cup to their most recently completed campaign.
