= Dundalk F.C. in European football =

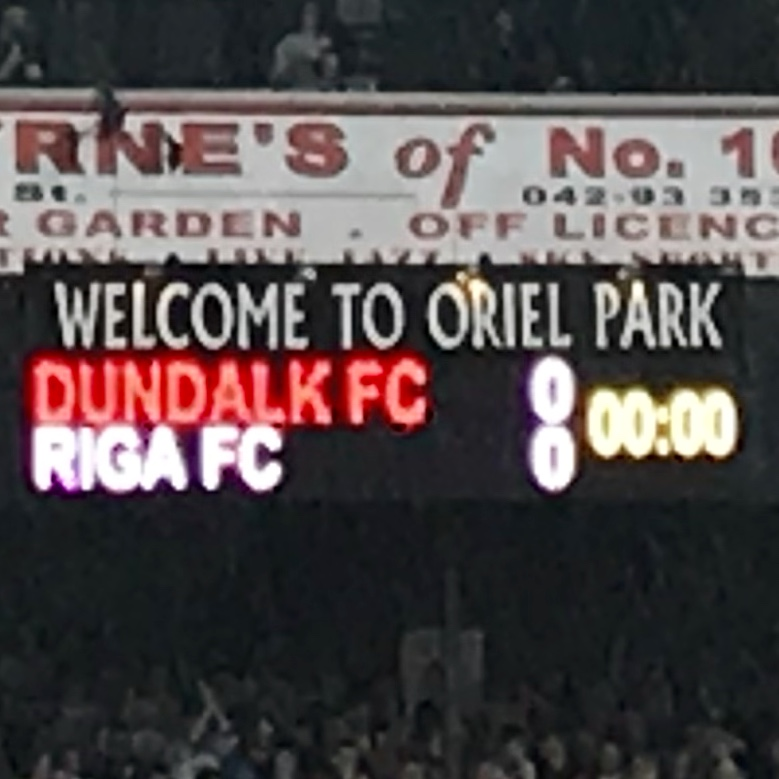
- Dundalk Vs. Riga, 2019–20 UEFA Champions League first qualifying round
- Club: Dundalk F.C.
- Most appearances: Andy Boyle (41) (Note: as of match played 3 August 2023)
- Top scorer: David McMillan (13)
- First entry: 1963–64 European Cup
- Latest entry: 2023–24 UEFA Europa Conference League

Dundalk Football Club is a professional association football club based in Dundalk, Ireland that competes in the League of Ireland Premier Division, the top tier of football in the Republic of Ireland.

Dundalk have played against several major names in European football such as Liverpool, Tottenham Hotspur, Arsenal, Celtic, FC Porto, PSV Eindhoven, Ajax, Red Star Belgrade, Hajduk Split, Legia Warsaw, and Zenit St Petersburg. They have faced opponents from the Netherlands most often, having played ties against PSV, Ajax, DOS Utrecht, AZ Alkmaar, and Vitesse Arnhem.

They made their European debut in the 1963–64 European Cup and in that campaign, they became the first Irish side to win an away match in Europe. Their best performance in the European Cup was in 1979–80, when they reached the last 16, and they reached the last 16 of the European Cup Winners' Cup in 1981–82. They have qualified twice for the Europa League group stage and they became the first team from Ireland to both win points and win a match at that level of European competition in 2016–17. The 2023–24 UEFA Europa Conference League was their 26th European campaign.

Dundalk play their home matches in Oriel Park, which is a Category 2 Stadium, able to accommodate 3,100 seated spectators for European games. Matches requiring grounds to have a Category 3 status have been played in Tallaght Stadium, owned by South Dublin County Council, while matches requiring Category 4 status have been played in the Aviva Stadium in Dublin.

== Background ==
The first continental competition organised by UEFA was the European Cup in 1955. Conceived by Gabriel Hanot, the editor of L'Équipe, as a competition for winners of the European national football leagues, it is considered the most prestigious European football competition. Two further competitions were created: the Inter-Cities Fairs Cup and UEFA Cup Winners' Cup. Established in 1955, the Inter-Cities Fairs Cup was later re-branded as the UEFA Cup when it came under the auspices of UEFA in 1971. Since the 2009–10 season, the competition has been known as the UEFA Europa League. The UEFA Cup Winners' Cup was inaugurated in 1960 for the winners of domestic cup competitions. The final tournament was held in 1998–99, after which it was absorbed into the UEFA Cup.

== History ==
=== The call up (1963–1969) ===
Dundalk's first involvement in European football was the 1963–64 European Cup, as the 1962–63 League Champions, drawing Swiss champions FC Zurich in the preliminary round. Their first match was the home-leg, played in Dalymount Park in Dublin on 11 September 1963, because Oriel Park did not have floodlights. Following a chastening 3–0 defeat, they travelled to Switzerland for the return leg more in hope than expectation. A first away win for any Irish club in a European tie followed, inspired by forward Jimmy Hasty. In the match they took a two-goal lead, with Hasty then hitting the crossbar as they looked to level the tie. A late goal for the home side settled the contest but gave Dundalk a 2–1 victory on the night. After having to play the Zurich tie in Dalymount, the installation of floodlighting in Oriel Park ahead of the visit of Vasas SC of Hungary four years later, and the narrow 1–0 defeat that followed, left the town "justifiably proud" at their club's achievement.

The following season saw a number of European firsts for Dundalk - they entered the Inter-Cities Fairs Cup for the first time, and won both their first European match in Oriel Park and their first European tie by defeating DOS Utrecht. They then met Glasgow Rangers in the following round and were well beaten, with crowd trouble in Oriel Park and around the town caused by the visiting Rangers fans marring the tie. The match had taken place in the midst of the violence surrounding the Civil Rights marches taking place in Northern Ireland at the time. A 14–0 aggregate thrashing at the hands of Liverpool in the Fairs Cup a year later, at a time when the club was struggling financially because of sizeable capital debts, remains their biggest defeat in European competition.

=== Safe European home (1976–1982) ===
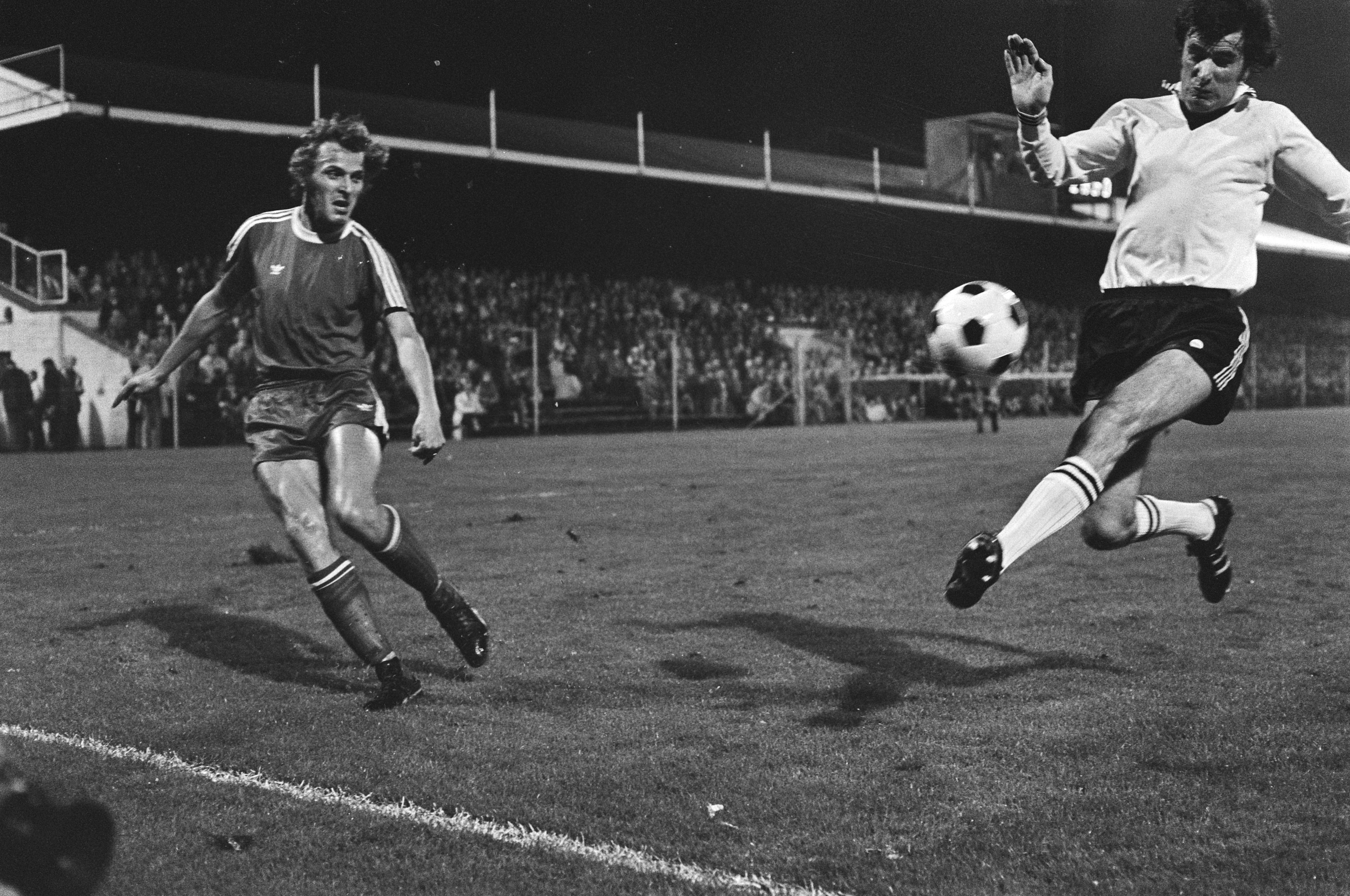
Dundalk player-manager Jim McLaughlin in action away to PSV Eindhoven in 1976

When Dundalk won the League in 1975–76 under Jim McLaughlin, it brought European football back to the town for the first time since 1969. In the following season's European Cup they met PSV Eindhoven, and were deemed unlucky to only draw the first leg in Oriel Park. That match started an unbeaten run in Europe in Oriel Park of eight matches over the following five seasons. In the following season's Cup Winners' Cup they defeated Hajduk Split at home, but an argument over players' expenses before the journey to Yugoslavia for the return leg, which saw two players left at home, scuppered an opportunity to progress. The unbeaten run at home included draws with Porto and Tottenham Hotspur. They also secured what was their record victory in Europe until 2021 – a 4–0 victory over Fram in the 1981–82 European Cup Winners' Cup. The unbeaten run at home came to an end in 1982, when they lost 4–1 at home to a Liverpool side inspired by Irish international Ronnie Whelan, who scored twice in Oriel, and again in Liverpool's 1–0 victory in the second leg. Unbeknown to the club and its supporters at the time, the Liverpool tie was to be McLaughlin's last European tie at the club.

The European highlight of McLaughlin's time at the club was the 1979–80 European Cup. The Double winning side overcame Linfield in a tie marred by rioting in Oriel Park, which occurred at the height of The Troubles. Linfield were punished by UEFA for the actions of their supporters by being banned from playing their home-leg in Belfast, and being forced to pay for damage to Oriel Park and Dundalk's expenses for the return leg. That return leg was played behind closed doors in Haarlem in the Netherlands, with Dundalk winning 2–0 (3–1 on aggregate). Dundalk then defeated Hibernians of Malta in the next round to reach the last-16 and a tie with Glasgow Celtic.

The prize for the winners would be a quarter-final tie with Real Madrid. Following a highly creditable 3–2 defeat in the away leg in Parkhead, a record attendance in Oriel Park witnessed a scoreless draw, with club stalwart Tommy McConville coming closest to scoring the goal that would have put Dundalk through on away goals. The 1979–80 European Cup run was the subject of a documentary made in 2015 – Once In A Lifetime - produced by Square 1 Productions and broadcast on Setanta Sports on 6 August 2015.

=== Train in vain (1987–2002) ===
Dundalk played six European ties between 1987 and 2002 (including glamour ties against Ajax Amsterdam, the Cup Winners' Cup holders, in 1987–88, and Red Star Belgrade in 1988–89), losing five of these ties without scoring a goal. The exception was the 1991–92 European Cup. They took the lead away to Honved in Budapest, with the game finishing 1–1. This was the club's best European result in 10 years, and the first time they had not lost an away leg since 1968 (the 'away' leg against Linfield in 1979 having been played at a neutral venue). An away goal to the good, a disappointing 2–0 defeat in Oriel Park cost the club a second round tie with Sampdoria, at a time when Serie A was the dominant and most popular league in Europe, and when the club was in need of a glamour tie to rekindle interest in the domestic game. The Honved match was the last European match played in Oriel Park until 2010 – the Malmö tie in 1995 being played in United Park in Drogheda, because the Oriel pitch was being relaid, and the Varteks tie in 2002 being played in Tolka Park, because Oriel did not meeting UEFA's upgraded standards for football stadiums at the time.

=== Death or glory (2010–2015) ===
Oriel Park hadn't seen European football since 1991 and, as things were, the ground didn't meet UEFA's requirements for hosting games were the club to reach Europe again. So, after qualifying for the Europa League qualifying rounds in 2010, a concerted effort was made to ensure the matches would be played in Oriel – the 'BE-TOP' (Bring Europe to Oriel Park) campaign. The first European match in the town of Dundalk for nearly 19-years saw Dundalk defeat Grevenmacher and make it through to the second qualifying round. Levski Sofia were next, and the gulf in standard was reflected in the 8–0 aggregate defeat.

After a financial and ownership crisis that had threatened to put the club out of business in 2012, the club's fortunes were revived under Stephen Kenny. In his first European campaign at the club, they made it to the second qualifying round in the 2014–15 Europa League. Kenny's side gave an indication of their potential on the European stage by defeating Hajduk Split in Split on a 2–1 scoreline – just failing to score the goal that would have won the tie on away goals. The following season an opportunity was missed against BATE Borisov in the Champions League, when a 0–0 home draw wasn't enough to take advantage of an away goal scored in the first-leg of the second qualifying round.

=== Last gang in town (2016) ===
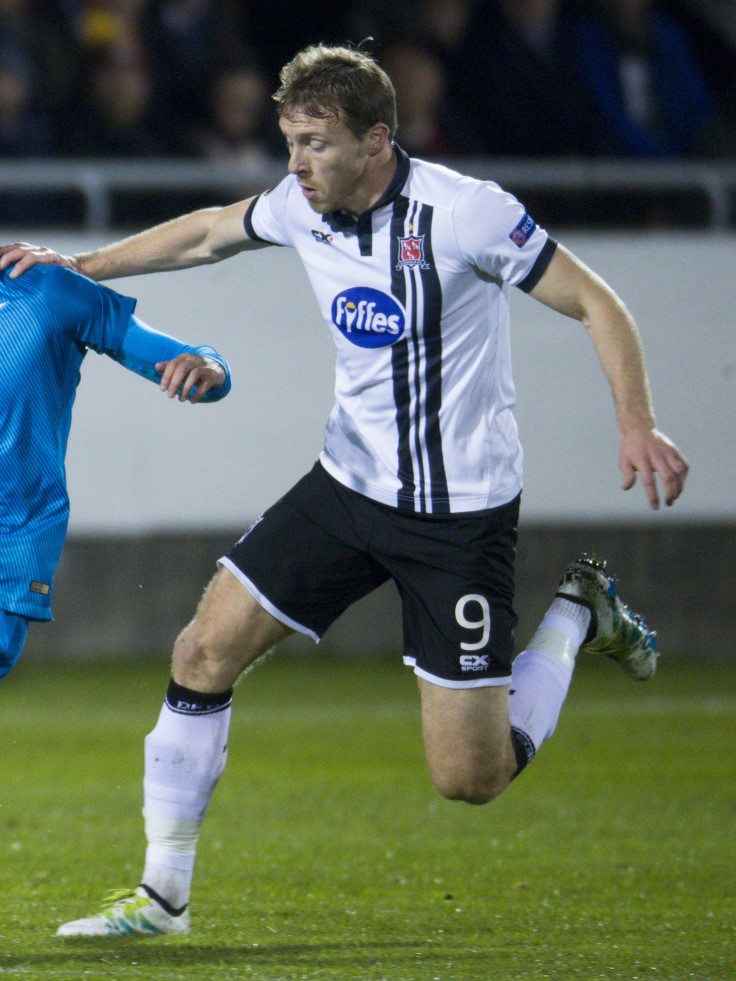
Dundalk forward David McMillan in action in the 2016–17 Europa League.

The 2016–17 Champions League saw Dundalk reach the play-off round, after they first defeated FH of Iceland, then came from a goal down in the tie to defeat BATE 3–0 in Tallaght Stadium, winning through 3–1 on aggregate. Dundalk drew Legia Warsaw, with the first leg played in the Aviva Stadium in Dublin in front of a crowd of 30,417. They suffered a 2–0 defeat in the home leg, but shocked Legia in the return leg by taking a 1–0 lead with a Robbie Benson volley. With Dundalk pushing for the equaliser that would have taken the tie to extra-time, Legia scored on the break, and won the tie 3–1 on aggregate.

Defeat in the play-off round meant that Dundalk qualified for the group stage of the Europa League, only the second Irish team to have done so. A draw with AZ Alkmaar in the Netherlands, followed by a victory over Maccabi Tel Aviv in Tallaght Stadium, were the first points earned by an Irish club at this stage of a European competition – both the equaliser in Alkmaar and the winning goal in Tallaght being scored by Ciarán Kilduff. In the third match they took the lead in Tallaght against Zenit St Petersburg, and were 20 minutes from topping the table, before eventually losing 2–1. In a campaign that would run from 13 July to 8 December, five weeks beyond the end of the domestic season, Dundalk failed to pick up any more points in the remaining matches but the performances of Kenny's team had attracted considerable attention.

=== Remote control (2017–2019) ===
Following the club's long campaign in 2016, losing to Rosenborg after extra-time in the Champions League second qualifying round tie the following season was a disappointment, even with the financial and organisational disparity between the sides. In January 2018 the club was taken over by United States-based investors, who had identified European progress as an opportunity. But progress that summer was limited when, after defeating Levadia Tallinn and holding AEK Larnaca scoreless in Oriel Park, three quickfire first half goals in the away leg in Cyprus in the 2018-19 Europa League second qualifying round ended their interest in that year's competition.

On foot of winning the League in 2018, they entered the 2019–20 UEFA Champions League first qualifying round. After being seeded in the draw, they faced Riga, drawing the home leg in Oriel Park 0–0. The away leg in Riga was the club's 70th match in European football, which also finished 0–0. After extra-time failed to separate the sides, they won 5–4 in a sudden-death penalty shootout, becoming the first Irish side to win a tie in that manner. They were knocked out in the second qualifying round by Qarabağ when a 1–1 home draw was followed by a 3–0 defeat away in Baku. As a result, they dropped into the Europa League third qualifying round. Their interest in Europe for the season ended there, with a 4–1 aggregate defeat to Slovan Bratislava, which was characterised by the lack of clinical finishing that had dogged the side throughout the campaign.

=== Career Opportunities (2020–2023) ===
They entered the 2020–21 UEFA Champions League as the seeded team in the first qualifying round and were drawn away to Celje. They were defeated 3–0 in the single-leg tie, which was played at Szusza Ferenc Stadion, Budapest (Hungary) because of travel restrictions related to the COVID-19 pandemic between Slovenia and Ireland. In the aftermath of that defeat, manager Vinny Perth was sacked by the club and replaced by Filippo Giovagnoli as interim head coach. Dundalk again dropped into the Europa League and in the second qualifying round faced Andorran champions Inter Club d'Escaldes, winning 1–0. They then faced Moldovan champions Sheriff Tiraspol in the third qualifying round. Sheriff took an early lead but Dundalk rallied and equalised in first half stoppage time. Despite dominating subsequently, the game eventually went to penalties and Dundalk came out on top, 5–3. The victory gave Dundalk a chance to reach the UEFA Europa League group stage for the second time in their history. In the play-off round, they faced KÍ of Klaksvík in the Faroe Islands at the Aviva Stadium, and won 3–1.

They were seeded fourth for the group stage and were drawn in Group B alongside Arsenal, Rapid Wien, and Molde. In the first match at home to Molde, Dundalk took a first half lead through Sean Murray, before going down 2–1. Matchday 2 saw a comfortable win for Arsenal in the Emirates Stadium, 3–0, while Matchday 3 in Vienna finished 4–3 to Rapid after Dundalk had again taken the lead. After a three-week break, the visit of Rapid to Dublin saw the Austrians win more comfortably, 3–1. They failed to pick up any points from the second set of matches, and finished bottom of the group on 0 points. They also received a €50,000 fine from Uefa for 'shadow coaching', as interim head coach Filippo Giovagnoli did not hold a Uefa Pro Licence.

In 2021, they defeated Newtown A.F.C. of Wales in the first qualifying round of the new Europa Conference League 5–0 on aggregate, which included a 4–0 victory in the first leg equalling the club record from forty years earlier. In the second qualifying round, they overcame Levadia Tallinn 4–3 on aggregate with Will Patching scoring a stoppage time winner in the second leg in Estonia. They were knocked out in the third qualifying round by Vitesse Arnhem, 4–3 on aggregate, after a 2–1 defeat in the second leg at 'home' in Tallaght Stadium, which saw a Michael Duffy goal after 40 seconds correctly disallowed for offside.

After failing to qualify for European competition for 2022–23, they qualified for the 2023–24 UEFA Europa Conference League under new head coach Stephen O'Donnell They reached the second qualifying round with a 3–1 aggregate win over Bruno's Magpies but were knocked out by KA, 5–3 on aggregate. Andy Boyle took the club record for appearances in Europe during the campaign, playing his 41st match in the second leg against KA.

== Record ==
The record for the most appearances in European competition is held by Andy Boyle. David McMillan has scored the most goals for the club in Europe. The biggest victory in a European match is 4–0, achieved with home wins against Fram Reykjavík in the 1981–82 European Cup Winners' Cup, and Newtown in the 2021–22 UEFA Europa Conference League.

=== Overall European record ===
As of 3 August 2023.

| Competition | Pld | W | D | L | GF | GA |
|---|---|---|---|---|---|---|
| European Cup / UEFA Champions League | 33 | 4 | 12 | 17 | 24 | 60 |
| UEFA Cup / UEFA Europa League | 37 | 9 | 5 | 23 | 34 | 73 |
| UEFA Europa Conference League | 9 | 4 | 3 | 2 | 16 | 11 |
| European Cup Winners' Cup / UEFA Cup Winners' Cup | 8 | 2 | 1 | 5 | 7 | 14 |
| Inter-Cities Fairs Cup | 6 | 1 | 1 | 4 | 4 | 25 |
| TOTAL | 94 | 20 | 23 | 51 | 87 | 185 |

=== All match results ===
| Season | Competition | Round | Club | Home | Away | Aggregate |
|---|---|---|---|---|---|---|
| 1963–64 | European Cup | PR | (Switzerland) Zürich | 0–3 | 2–1 | 2–4 |
| 1967–68 | European Cup | 1R | (Hungary) Vasas | 0–1 | 1–8 | 1–9 |
| 1968–69 | Inter-Cities Fairs Cup | 1R | (Netherlands) DOS Utrecht | 2–1 (Note: The tie went to extra time.) | 1–1 | 3–2 |
| 1968–69 | Inter-Cities Fairs Cup | 2R | (Scotland) Rangers | 0–3 | 1–6 | 1–9 |
| 1969–70 | Inter-Cities Fairs Cup | 1R | (England) Liverpool | 0–4 | 0–10 | 0–14 |
| 1976–77 | European Cup | 1R | (Netherlands) PSV Eindhoven | 1–1 | 0–6 | 1–7 |
| 1977–78 | European Cup Winners' Cup | 1R | (Socialist Federal Republic of Yugoslavia) Hajduk Split | 1–0 | 0–4 | 1–4 |
| 1979–80 | European Cup | PR | (Northern Ireland) Linfield | 1–1 | 2–0 | 3–1 |
| 1979–80 | European Cup | 1R | (Malta) Hibernians | 2–0 | 0–1 | 2–1 |
| 1979–80 | European Cup | 2R | (Scotland) Celtic | 0–0 | 2–3 | 2–3 |
| 1980–81 | UEFA Cup | 1R | (Portugal) Porto | 0–0 | 0–1 | 0–1 |
| 1981–82 | European Cup Winners' Cup | 1R | (Iceland) Fram | 4–0 | 1–2 | 5–2 |
| 1981–82 | European Cup Winners' Cup | 2R | (England) Tottenham Hotspur | 1–1 | 0–1 | 1–2 |
| 1982–83 | European Cup | 1R | (England) Liverpool | 1–4 | 0–1 | 1–5 |
| 1987–88 | European Cup Winners' Cup | 1R | (Netherlands) Ajax | 0–2 | 0–4 | 0–6 |
| 1988–89 | European Cup | 1R | (Socialist Federal Republic of Yugoslavia) Red Star Belgrade | 0–5 | 0–3 | 0–8 |
| 1989–90 | UEFA Cup | 1R | (Switzerland) Wettingen | 0–2 | 0–3 | 0–5 |
| 1991–92 | European Cup | 1R | (Hungary) Budapest Honvéd | 0–2 | 1–1 | 1–3 |
| 1995–96 | UEFA Cup | PR | (Sweden) Malmö FF | 0–2 | 0–2 | 0–4 |
| 2002–03 | UEFA Cup | PR | (Croatia) Varteks | 0–4 | 0–5 | 0–9 |
| 2010–11 | UEFA Europa League | 1Q | (Luxembourg) Grevenmacher | 2–1 | 3–3 | 5–4 |
| 2010–11 | UEFA Europa League | 2Q | (Bulgaria) Levski Sofia | 0–2 | 0–6 | 0–8 |
| 2014–15 | UEFA Europa League | 1Q | (Luxembourg) Jeunesse Esch | 3–1 | 2–0 | 5–1 |
| 2014–15 | UEFA Europa League | 2Q | (Croatia) Hajduk Split | 0–2 | 2–1 | 2–3 |
| 2015–16 | UEFA Champions League | 2Q | (Belarus) BATE Borisov | 0–0 | 1–2 | 1–2 |
| 2016–17 | UEFA Champions League | 2Q | (Iceland) FH | 1–1 | 2–2 | 3–3 (Note: Dundalk won on the away goals rule.) |
| 2016–17 | UEFA Champions League | 3Q | (Belarus) BATE Borisov | 3–0 | 0–1 | 3–1 |
| 2016–17 | UEFA Champions League | PO | (Poland) Legia Warsaw | 0–2 | 1–1 | 1–3 |
| 2016–17 | UEFA Europa League | Group D | (Russia) Zenit Saint Petersburg | 1–2 | 1–2 | 4th |
| 2016–17 | UEFA Europa League | Group D | (Netherlands) AZ | 0–1 | 1–1 | 4th |
| 2016–17 | UEFA Europa League | Group D | (Israel) Maccabi Tel Aviv | 1–0 | 1–2 | 4th |
| 2017–18 | UEFA Champions League | 2Q | (Norway) Rosenborg | 1–1 | 1–2 (Note: The tie went to extra time.) | 2–3 |
| 2018–19 | UEFA Europa League | 1Q | (Estonia) FCI Levadia | 2–1 | 1–0 | 3–1 |
| 2018–19 | UEFA Europa League | 2Q | (Cyprus) AEK Larnaca | 0–0 | 0−4 | 0–4 |
| 2019–20 | UEFA Champions League | 1Q | (Latvia) Riga | 0–0 | 0–0 (Note: The tie went to extra time.) | 0–0 (Note: Dundalk won on penalties.) |
| 2019–20 | UEFA Champions League | 2Q | (Azerbaijan) Qarabağ | 1–1 | 0−3 | 1–4 |
| 2019–20 | UEFA Europa League | 3Q | (Slovakia) Slovan Bratislava | 1–3 | 0–1 | 1–4 |
| 2020–21 | UEFA Champions League | 1Q | (Slovenia) Celje | — (Note: single leg tie due to COVID-19 pandemic—'away' tie played at neutral venue, Szusza Ferenc Stadion, Budapest, Hungary.) | 0–3 | — |
| 2020–21 | UEFA Europa League | 2Q | (Andorra) Inter Escaldes | — (Note: single leg tie due to COVID-19 pandemic—away tie.) | 1–0 | — |
| 2020–21 | UEFA Europa League | 3Q | (Moldova) Sheriff Tiraspol | — (Note: single leg tie due to COVID-19 pandemic—away tie.) | 1–1 (Note: Dundalk won on penalties.) | — |
| 2020–21 | UEFA Europa League | PO | (Faroe Islands) KÍ | 3–1 | — (Note: single leg tie due to COVID-19 pandemic—home tie played in the Aviva Stadium, Dublin.) | — |
| 2020–21 | UEFA Europa League | Group B | (England) Arsenal | 2–4 | 0–3 | 4th |
| 2020–21 | UEFA Europa League | Group B | (Austria) Rapid Wien | 1–3 | 3–4 | 4th |
| 2020–21 | UEFA Europa League | Group B | (Norway) Molde | 1–2 | 1–3 | 4th |
| 2021–22 | UEFA Europa Conference League | 1Q | (Wales) Newtown | 4–0 | 1–0 | 5–0 |
| 2021–22 | UEFA Europa Conference League | 2Q | (Estonia) FCI Levadia | 2–2 | 2–1 | 4–3 |
| 2021–22 | UEFA Europa Conference League | 3Q | (Netherlands) Vitesse Arnhem | 1–2 | 2–2 | 3–4 |
| 2023–24 | UEFA Europa Conference League | 1Q | (Gibraltar) Bruno's Magpies | 3–1 | 0–0 | 3–1 |
| 2023–24 | UEFA Europa Conference League | 2Q | (Iceland) KA | 2–2 | 1–3 | 3–5 |
