= History of Dundalk F.C. (1903–1965) =

Dundalk
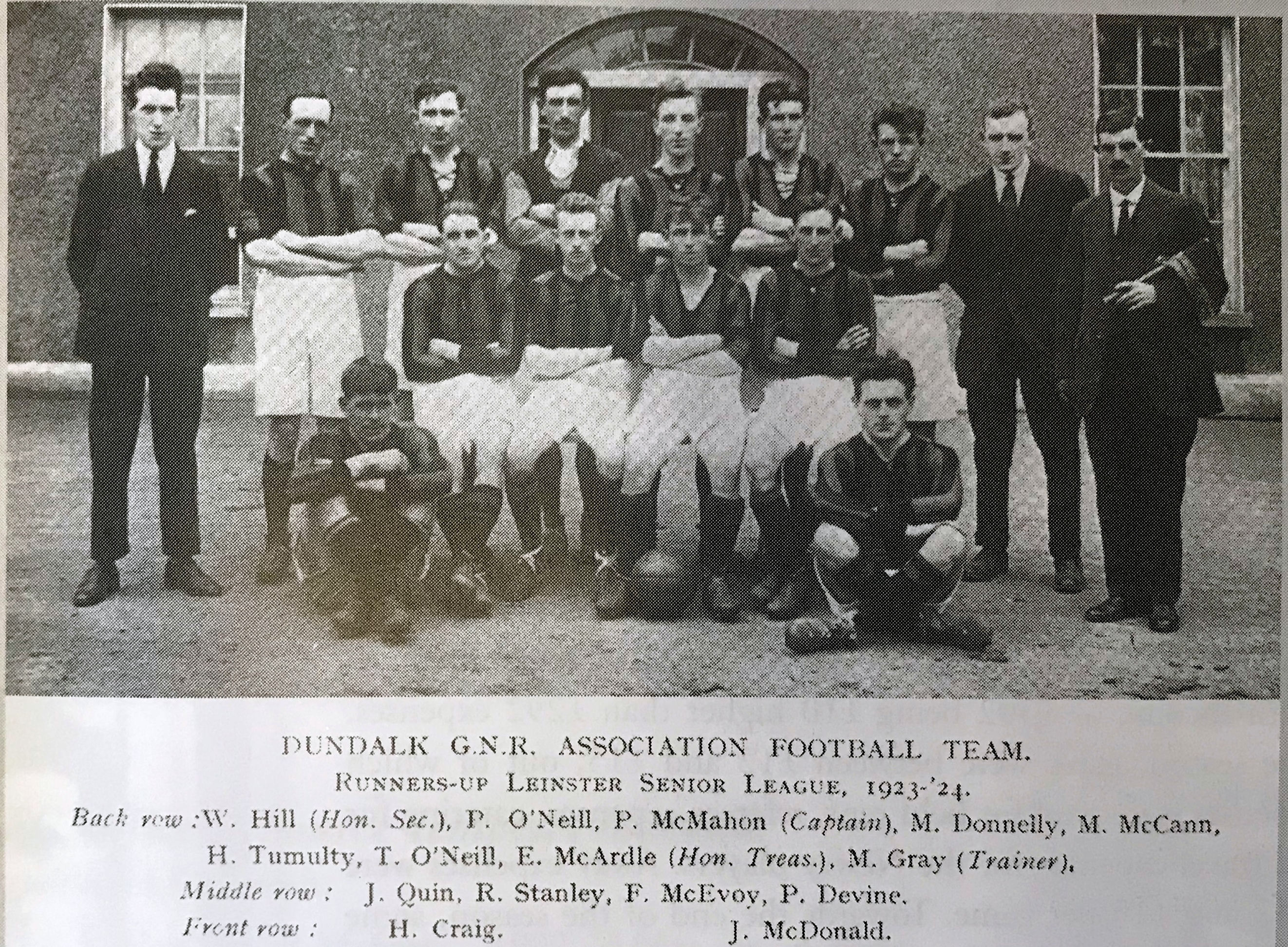
- Founded: September 1903; 123 years ago as Dundalk G.N.R. Association Club
- League: League of Ireland Premier Division
- Website: http://www.Dundalkfc.com

The History of Dundalk Football Club (1903–1965) briefly describes the introduction of association football to the town of Dundalk, Ireland in the pre-World War I period, then subsequently covers the period from the formation of the Dundalk G.N.R. Association Club in September 1903 to the takeover of the club as a public limited company in January 1966. This page also includes short articles about events and people that were an integral part of that period of the club's history.

== Football's origins in the town (1889–1914) ==
Contemporary records of organised association football in the Dundalk area between the late 1880s (when the game was introduced), and the end of the World War I, are incomplete. The earliest reference to a Dundalk team playing in competition appears in the Belfast Newsletter of 2 October 1889, which stated that "Dundalk" had been drawn to play Newry Wanderers in the First Round of the Irish Football Association Irish Junior Cup – the third year of the competition. This side was a team from the Educational Institution (now Dundalk Grammar School). The school had adopted the game under its principal Thomas A. Finch, who had played while a student at Trinity College Dublin. Older references to "Dundalk F.C." and "Dundalk Football Club" actually refer to the modern-day Dundalk Rugby Club, formed in 1877.

In 1892, a new team called 'Dundalk' was formed. The Dundalk Democrat reported on a match that had occurred on Saturday 3 December 1892, which was the fifth encounter between Dundalk and the Institution 2nd XI, after four previous draws. This club established itself as the premier club in the town between about 1895 and 1904. They were runners-up to Bohemians in the 1896–97 Leinster Senior Cup Final, and were invited to enter the Leinster Senior League for the 1900–01 season in September 1900. They adopted the name "Dundalk Rovers" for the step up, but they did not survive the season, being requested to resign from the League "owing to their inability to fulfil their engagements". The club continued to compete in the junior cup competitions, however, reaching the Leinster Junior Cup Final in 1903, where they lost to St. Patrick's of Inchicore.

Before the 1904–05 season commenced, the clubs of the town amalgamated under the 'Dundalk Association Football Club' banner in order to give the town a better chance at success in competition. The representatives of the Nomads club insisted that the 'Rovers' moniker be dropped to show that the new club was to represent the whole town. The amalgamated club reached the Leinster Junior Cup Final that season, being defeated by Shamrock Rovers. The following season it led the foundation of the Dundalk and District League (DDL) alongside Drogheda, St. Nicholas's, St Mary's College, Carrickmacross, and the Great Northern Railway. To "save ambiguity" they became known as Rovers again and formalised the name change the following year.

St Mary's College won the DDL in its first season, with British Army sides winning it for the following three seasons. The League appears to have been inactive for the seasons 1909–10 to 1912–13, at a time when Gaelic football had become the dominant sport in the county (with Louth qualifying for three All-Ireland Finals in those years). Rovers were replaced by St Nicholas's as Dundalk's representatives in the Irish and Leinster Junior Cup competitions in those seasons. The DDL was reformed in 1913–14, and Rovers returned to the league and to contest the Junior Cups. But that was their last season of competition before World War I broke out. After they failed to fulfil a 1914–15 Irish Junior Cup tie with Dundalk G.N.R. in November 1914, Rovers disappeared from competition until 1924, by which time 'the Railwaymen' had become the preeminent football club in the area.

== Dundalk G.N.R. in junior football (1903–1922) ==
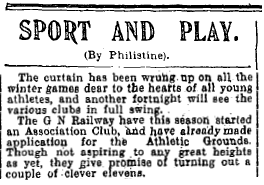
Announcement of the formation of Dundalk G.N.R. Association Football Club in the Dundalk Democrat, 26 September 1903

The Dundalk Great Northern Railway (G.N.R.) Football Club was established during the 1883–84 season as a rugby football club. They played their final rugby match in February 1903 and in September 1903 the club switched codes to association football, setting in motion its journey to become the modern-day Dundalk Football Club. The new club, known locally as 'the Railwaymen', adopted the Dundalk Athletic Grounds (a municipal facility shared by a number of sporting codes) as its home ground. At first, they played challenge matches against other teams in the area, including sides from British Army regiments garrisoned in the town, then became founder members of the DDL in 1905–06. There are no records of the club being active between the 1907–08 and 1912–13 seasons, however it rejoined the local league in 1913–14. The DDL was dormant during World War I, but Dundalk G.N.R. did compete in both the Irish and Leinster Junior Cup competitions of 1913–14, 1914–15 and 1916–17; while another side, Dundalk Town, competed in the 1917–18 and 1918–19 competitions.

In 1919, the founder of the Dundalk Town club, P.J. Casey (a future Dundalk A.F.C. committee member and League of Ireland honorary treasurer), led the revival of the Dundalk and District League and affiliated it with the Leinster Football Association. The G.N.R. club appears to have been inactive in the 1917–18 and 1918–19 seasons due to the war, but it re-formed too, and its members decided to enter every competition available to them that season – joining both the DDL and Newry and District League. A victory over Dundalk Town in the Irish Junior Cup of 1919–20, was a prelude to the G.N.R. team becoming the local scene's dominant side for the next three seasons. They had two wins and one runners-up finish in the DDL, and also won through to represent the district in the Junior Cup competitions each of those seasons. In 1920 they reached their first final, the Leinster Junior Cup Final, losing out to Avonmore after two replays.

== Stepping up (1922–1930) ==
Dundalk G.N.R. colours 1919–1927

Following the partition of Ireland, and the creation of the Football Association of Ireland (after the Leinster F.A. split with the Belfast-based IFA), a new Free State League was formed for the 1921–22 season, made up exclusively of Dublin-based sides. Subsequently, Dundalk G.N.R. successfully applied to join the Leinster Senior League (LSL) for the 1922–23 season, one of a number of junior clubs replacing clubs that had left to join the new Free State League – becoming the LSL's only team based outside of the greater Dublin area in the process. Ironically, they had been the only club affiliated with the Leinster F.A. to object in writing to the decision to split with the IFA in 1921.

In their first season in the LSL, the G.N.R. side finished fourth in the table (with three games in hand when the League was wrapped up), then finished third each of the following three seasons - coming closest to topping the table in 1925–26. That turned out to be the club's final season in that division as, in June 1926, they were elected to the Free State League to replace Pioneers, as the nascent League looked to spread to the provinces. They had previously applied for membership in the summer of 1924 but had been turned down. As it was entering its sixth season, nine clubs had already dropped out of the Free State League, so the challenge facing the new club was great. But Dundalk's unbroken participation in the League of Ireland was about to begin.

On 21 August 1926 the team, still known as Dundalk G.N.R. and under the management of Joe McCleery (ex-Belfast Celtic), travelled to Cork to face fellow works-team Fordsons in the opening match of the 1926–27 season. The 30-strong group of players, officials and supporters who travelled were treated to a tour of the Ford factory before the game. The result was a 2–1 defeat for the new boys in a match the Cork Examiner described as being "one of the best ever seen in Ballinlough", Joey Quinn (one of three veterans remaining from the junior football days) with Dundalk's first League of Ireland goal. They finished their first League season in eighth position, then in mid-table the next three seasons.

By this stage, the team represented the G.N.R. works in name only, and the club's management committee decided to make it independent of the company. In December 1927 new colours of white shirts with a crest of the town's coat of arms were adopted. They contested their first final as a senior club in April 1929—the Leinster Senior Cup final—losing in a replay. It was the last time the club was billed to be appearing as 'Dundalk G.N.R.', and the name of the club was formally changed to 'Dundalk A.F.C.' in the summer of 1930.

== Early successes (1930–1949) ==
Dundalk A.F.C. colours 1927–1939
Dundalk A.F.C. colours 1939–40

With a new manager, Steve Wright, "doing everything except selling the programmes", Dundalk finished as runners-up in both the League and the FAI Cup in 1930–31. Proof that they could compete at a national level gave the management committee confidence to press ahead, and the club was converted to a membership-based company— "Dundalk A.F.C. Limited" —on 25 January 1932. They became the first team from outside of Dublin to win a league title in 1932–33. Indeed, they were the first team from outside Dublin or Belfast to win a league title in Ireland since the inception of the Irish League in 1890. In the process they secured their first league victories over Shelbourne and Bohemians – Dublin's two original Irish League clubs. A shot at a League and Shield Double was spurned, when three defeats in a row towards the end of the Shield programme saw them slip to a runners-up spot. After Wright departed in 1934, the club became notorious for the number of cup final defeats suffered. There were FAI Cup and Leinster Senior Cup final defeats in 1934–35, and Dublin City Cup and Leinster Senior Cup final defeats the following season, which was their last season at the Athletic Grounds. In the summer of 1936, the committee decided to move to land made available by P.J. Casey on the Carrick Road and named the new ground "Oriel Park".

In 1936–37, the first season at their new home, they finished as runners-up again in both the City Cup and Leinster Senior Cup, as well as in the League. The search for cup success now became something of an obsession for both the club and the people of the town. Dundalk Rovers had lost one Leinster Senior Cup and two Leinster Junior Cup finals during their time as the town's premier side; while Dundalk G.N.R. had lost a Leinster Junior Cup final prior to joining the Leinster Senior League, and in their final match competing as "Dundalk G.N.R.", they had been defeated in their first Leinster Senior Cup final. The number of cup final defeats now stretched to eight across three tournaments since joining the Free State League. They had lost two Dublin City Cup finals in a row (being obliged to play the second, the 1937 final, against Sligo Rovers, 24-hours after defeating Waterford in the semi-final), so when they won the 1938 City Cup, defeating Cork 2–1 after extra time in the final, there was much rejoicing. "Dundalk have at last won a Cup Final!" exclaimed the Irish Press.

Following on from the City cup win, they led the Shield midway through its schedule, but, despite only losing once, they fell away due to the number of matches drawn. There was a similar story in the League, where they had the best defensive record and thrashed eventual champions Shamrock Rovers 5–1 in Glenmalure Park, but a run of three defeats saw them fall two points short of the title. Ironically, the losses to two of those teams – Sligo Rovers and Waterford – were followed by victories over both in the FAI Cup, to set up a final against St James's Gate – the third of those teams to defeat them in the League. The City Cup win hadn't changed their final day luck, however, as a third FAI Cup Final defeat followed. Another opportunity to win their first Shield was spurned in 1939–40 with a final day home defeat to Sligo Rovers when a win would have sealed it. With the club still heavily relying on gate receipts from cup ties to cover costs, a first-round defeat to Leinster Senior League side Distillery in the FAI Cup was a huge setback. Within days a number of players had been transferred to cut the wage bill, and trainer Gerry McCourt played a number of matches – despite having retired three years earlier. So a promising League season, which had seen them lead midway through the programme, petered out with Dundalk slipping to fourth after a number of defeats.

They were runners-up in the City Cup again in 1940–41 and, by this stage, supporters had come to believe that the club was jinxed. So when they finally won their first FAI Cup in 1942 by defeating Cork United in the final in Dalymount Park, a crowd said to be in the thousands greeted the team at the railway station on their return, cheering them through the streets during an impromptu parade. Five weeks later they were unofficially crowned "Champions of All Ireland", after winning the inaugural Dublin and Belfast Inter-City Cup. Having defeated northern sides Glentoran, Distillery and Belfast Celtic, they overcame Shamrock Rovers in the final. The following September, in the new season, a second Dublin City Cup was added, with victory over Drumcondra in the final, but they couldn't keep up the momentum and missed out on forcing play-offs by a single point in both the Shield and the League.

For the next few seasons, they lay in mid-table, while the management committee relied on player sales to English clubs to bankroll the club. But, with an improving squad, came a succession of near misses. The Shield remained elusive – they finished as runners-up to Drumcondra by a point in 1946–47, when the latter equalised with minutes remaining in their final match (against Waterford) to secure the point they needed. Then, in 1947–48, they just missed out in both the League and the Dublin City Cup by a point. So the committee decided to invest its surplus from transfer dealings that season on a player-coach (Ned Weir), and a number of full-time players, in an ambitious attempt to win the trophies that had been beyond reach. The investment immediately paid off when the City Cup was won at the start of the new season by topping its league format unbeaten; while the club's second FAI Cup was delivered with victory over Shelbourne in the final. But the new team fell short in both the Shield and the League, and, despite the Cup double and improved gate receipts, the additional income was not enough to cover the increase in costs.

== Struggles and recovery (1950–1965) ==
'Home' colours
since 1940

The attempt to maintain a full-time squad hadn't paid off and, as a result, the team was broken up. A surplus from transfer dealings prevented a more serious financial crisis arising, and, despite the large turnover in players, Dundalk finally won the Leinster Senior Cup for the first time in 1950–51, with victory over St. Patrick's Athletic at the death in the final - a match noteworthy for being the first held in Ireland to use a white ball. But the cutbacks were starting to tell, and they finished second from bottom in the League in 1951–52. However, they went on a memorable FAI Cup run - coming from 3–1 down in the semi-final replay against Waterford to win 6–4 in extra time; following that up with victory over Cork Athletic in the final (also in a replay), to deliver the club's third FAI Cup. Dundalk's opening goalscorer in the replay, Johnny Fearon, was the only survivor of the 1949 cup-winning side.

Midway through the 1952–53 season, club secretary Sam Prole left to take over at Drumcondra. Prole, a Great Northern Railway employee, had essentially run the club since its G.N.R. days, and had been primarily responsible for its transfer activities. Player sales tailed off after his departure, and the subsequent drop in income left the club struggling to make ends meet. As a result, obliged to focus on controlling costs, Dundalk spent most of the decade around the bottom of the league table. A first-round FAI Cup defeat to Transport in 1954 was notable for being their first defeat in an FAI Cup tie in Oriel Park, 18-years after the club moved to the ground. The nadir was reached the following season, when they finished last in both the Shield and the League and were knocked out of both the City Cup and the FAI Cup in the first round. Slowly, things started to turn around, and a cup run in which no goals were conceded ended with a victory over Shamrock Rovers in the 1958 final, giving them their fourth FAI Cup. Inside-right Hughie Gannon broke his jaw in the process of scoring the only goal of the final and missed the celebrations, having to spend a week in hospital.

The following season was another write-off, but the committee were finally able to put together a balanced squad for 1959–60, and some of the best results in years saw Dundalk go into 1960 at the top of the League table, finishing three points off the top that season. The club's highest finish in 12 seasons lead to optimism that the lean years might be coming to an end, and, to help make the case, a second Leinster Senior Cup was picked up in 1960–61. Then, with trainer Gerry McCourt (a veteran of the 1932–33 League winning side) having to manage a squad split between separate training bases in Dundalk and Dublin, they won their first League title for 30 years in 1962–63 in nerve-shredding fashion. In the final game, away to Bohemians, they had to come from two goals down to score twice in the last five minutes, securing a point. They then had to wait a full week for a fixture backlog to clear, with Shelbourne, Cork Celtic and Drumcondra all in the hunt. All three faltered, confirming Dundalk as Champions.

Following that success, they entered European competition for the first time, where they became the first Irish side to win an away leg of a European tie by beating FC Zurich 2–1 (in a 4–2 aggregate defeat) in the 1963–64 European Cup, inspired by forward Jimmy Hasty – who scored one, assisted another and hit the crossbar with a chance to level the tie. Dundalk couldn't manage to retain the title that season, finishing as runners-up to Shamrock Rovers, but did prevent Rovers achieving an unprecedented clean sweep of competitions by winning the season-end Top Four Cup.

A poor 1964–65 followed and the club's management committee decided that it was time to hire a modern-style manager, with sole responsibility for recruitment and player selection, for the first time. They appointed Gerry Doyle, who had been associated with Shelbourne for most of his career as a player and a coach. The new season saw little improvement, however, and with losses mounting and investment in Oriel Park needed, it became clear early in the 1965–66 season that the membership-based ownership model could not provide the financial support required to take the club forward. A new public limited company took over in January 1966, after the voluntary liquidation of the old company.

== The anatomy of Dundalk: a history in stubs ==
=== Year founded ===
The official year of formation of Dundalk Football Club is up for debate. Each of the following has grounds for consideration:

- 1884 - the year the Dundalk G.N.R. football club was founded.
- 1903 - the year the G.N.R. football club switched codes from rugby to association football.
- 1919 - the year Dundalk G.N.R. was re-formed after a two-season hiatus, since when the club has maintained a continuous existence.
- 1922 - the year Dundalk G.N.R. moved from junior to senior football by joining the Leinster Senior League.
- 1926 - the year Dundalk G.N.R. joined the League of Ireland.

Owing to the lack of contemporary records retained by the club, it has quoted each of 1919, 1922, and 1926 as foundation dates in various programme notes and publications, while the latter date is often used by external sources. Following extensive research by club historian Jim Murphy, the true year of formation is either 1903 or 1919—indeed, the Double win in 1979 was celebrated as having taken place in the club's Diamond Jubilee year. The answer depends on whether the G.N.R. club formed in 1919 is considered a new club or a continuation of the old club, despite appearing to have been inactive in the 1907–1913 and 1917–1919 periods. Murphy's work indicates that it's the latter, giving a year of formation of 1903—the year the G.N.R. Football Club switched codes from rugby to association football.

=== The works teams ===
A works-team, or factory-team, is a sports team created and run by a business. Dundalk F.C. were founded as the works-team of the Great Northern Railway (Ireland) in 1903. When the club joined the League of Ireland in 1926, it was one of four works-teams in the 10-team League - the others being Jacobs, St. James's Gate and Fordsons. Another railway works-team – Midland Athletic of the Midland Great Western Railway – had competed for two seasons, but became defunct when the company was merged into the Great Southern Railways Company. Another side, Transport (representing CIÉ), joined the League in 1948–49 but, after they failed to be re-elected for 1962–63 (Dundalk's second championship-winning season), Dundalk were again left as the only surviving club in the League with works-team roots. The football club outgrew the G.N.R., becoming a membership-based limited company in 1932. The works themselves became Dundalk Engineering Works Ltd in 1958 with the demise of the G.N.R.(I). Employment at the works dwindled over the subsequent years and the company eventually went into receivership in 1985 with the loss of the remaining 300 jobs - at a time when unemployment in the town had reached 26%.

=== All-Ireland Champions! ===
Following the split between the Belfast-based IFA and the Dublin-based Leinster Football Association, who founded the FAI in 1921, both associations claimed to be the representative body for football on the island of Ireland. Both competed as "Ireland" on the international stage and both selected players from both jurisdictions for matches (the FAI until 1946 and the IFA until 1950). This situation had partly arisen because the four UK associations (the self-styled Home Nations) had withdrawn from Fifa between 1920 and 1946.

Despite the split, there were numerous attempts at reconciliation. Dundalk's Sam Prole lead many of these endeavours on principle, but also because competing against Northern sides was felt to be in Dundalk's interests commercially. With the onset of World War II the League of Ireland and particularly the Irish League were suffering financially due to a lack of matches, and administrators from both associations agreed to the creation of a cross-border competition - the Dublin and Belfast Inter-City Cup. It was the first time there had been formalised all-Ireland competition since the partition of Ireland and the first 'true' all-Ireland competition, given that the original Irish League only contained two teams from outside what became Northern Ireland - Bohemians and Shelbourne of Dublin.

In the competition's first season, six of the 10 League of Ireland sides were matched up with all six Irish League sides in a two-legged knockout format. Dundalk defeated Glentoran in the first round, Distillery in the second, and Belfast Celtic in the semi-final - all northern sides. Dundalk then defeated Shamrock Rovers in the final to become Irish football's first 'All-Ireland Champions'. The competition survived until the end of the decade, but a combination of factors (the failure to resolve the split, the withdrawal of Belfast Celtic from the Irish League, and the entrenchment of sectarianism in the Northern game) saw it discontinued.

=== The Scottish Team ===
Dundalk had finished as runners-up in the League in 1947–48, unbeaten at home, and with a healthy surplus from improved gates, friendlies against Everton and Luton Town, and transfer dealings. This allowed the management-committee to make some much-needed improvements to Oriel Park that summer. However the appointment of Ned Weir (signed from Raith Rovers) as the team's new head coach, a Scottish physio (Hugh O'Donnell), and the signing of six Scottish full-time players, represented a gamble by the club. As things stood, gate-receipts did not match wages, and player transfers to England in the years following World War II were keeping it afloat. So the investment was an ambitious attempt to bring the club to a new level of competitiveness and success, and the hope was that gate-receipts would follow. The City Cup was won at the start of the new season by topping its League format unbeaten; while in the League and Shield they were competitive without really threatening to win either competition - finishing third in both. But the club's fourth FAI Cup was delivered with victory over champions-elect Drumcondra in the semi-final, and Shelbourne in the final. They reached the final of the last Dublin and Belfast Inter-City Cup, where a tired side, which had played eight matches in three weeks, was defeated in the final. Despite two cups, the gamble hadn't paid off. Between 1946–47 and 1948–49 income had doubled, but wages and costs had almost trebled in the same period, and the cash surplus had become a significant debt within a year. It didn't help that on the day of the cup final the players demanded a 20% increase in the win bonus, refusing to tog-out until it was agreed. As a result, the "Scottish team" was broken up at the end of the season, and the dream of maintaining a full-time squad was over. Only one player, Newry man Johnny Fearon, would still be at the club for its next FAI Cup success three seasons later. He would later become the team physio during the 1970s.

== The names heard long ago ==
=== Samuel Robert Prole ===
Sam Prole (1897–1975) was the Secretary of Dundalk F.C. from 1928 until 1952. In his role at the club he had a reputation for doing whatever it took to "keep the show on the road". Prole was a Great Northern Railway employee from Dublin who joined up to fight in World War I, before moving to Dundalk to the G.N.R. Works on his return home. He played with the re-formed football club from 1919 until a broken leg ended his playing career in 1923. Prole had already joined the management committee of the club by the end of his playing days, and it was his driving ambition that saw the club step up into the Leinster Senior League and later the Free State League. Without his efforts - in particular in the player transfer market - it's unlikely that the club would have survived its early years in the League. Prole was also a long-term member of numerous FAI and League of Ireland committees throughout his career as a football administrator, including serving as Chairman of the FAI Council (forerunner to the role of 'FAI President'), and it was he who lead most of the efforts during the 1930s and 1940s to reconcile the FAI and the IFA after the split of 1921. He was also an advocate for the betterment of the League and Irish football as a whole. For instance, he was calling for a close season for the League in winter and playing into the summer as early as 1937, and was critical of RTÉ in FAI meetings in 1965 for scrapping its soccer highlights show and the broadcaster's lack of publicity for its replacement.

During his years at Dundalk, he was the G.N.R. 'Works Manager's Chief Clerk'. After retiring from the G.N.R., and because Dundalk was still a membership-based club, he decided it was time to strike out on his own. So he joined the board of Drumcondra in February 1953, before taking the club over from the Hunter family with his sons. Over the following 19 years, they had considerable success. But, after a period of decline, Drums agreed to be taken over by Home Farm in 1972, ending the Prole family's association with the club. Sam Prole vacated the role of Chairman of the FAI Council the same summer, bringing his 50-year career as a football administrator to a close. He died in 1975.

=== Eddie Carroll ===
Eddie Carroll (1901–1975) was Dundalk's first star player. From Bessbrook in Northern Ireland, he joined the club from Dundee United for Dundalk's second League of Ireland season and, over the following two seasons, he scored 75 times in 65 appearances - including a hat-trick on his debut, the first by a Dundalk player in the League. Nominally a centre-forward, he was reputed to have played in every position including goalkeeper at least once for the team Following a dispute with the club, after an argument with Dundalk's first Irish international Bob Egan, he left for Newry Town, then joined Dolphin, but returned in 1932 for Dundalk's first League winning season. Now playing as a right-sided winger he still chipped in with another 37 goals in 101 appearances, including becoming the first player to score four goals in a League of Ireland match. He left again early in the 1935–36 season to return to Dolphin, who went on to win their only League title that season. He had one more short stint at Dundalk in 1937 as a player, scoring one more goal, and trained the team's Dublin-based players until 1940. He holds the club record for most goals scored in the League of Ireland Shield and the joint-record with Jimmy Hasty for most goals scored in the Leinster Senior Cup.

=== Billy O'Neill ===
William 'Billy' O'Neill (1916–1978) holds the club record for the most Ireland international caps while at Dundalk, earning 11 caps between 1935 and 1939. O'Neill (whose father was the first secretary of the G.N.R. Association Football Club when it first formed in 1903) made 330 appearances for Dundalk between 1934 and 1944. Despite starting out as a full-back, he scored 16 goals in 20 games when pressed into service at centre-forward in his debut season, including a hat-trick in his first match in the position. He also scored in all four rounds of the 1934–35 FAI Cup, including in the 4–3 loss to Bohemians in the final. But he would play most of his career at right full-back, which was also his position in the Irish team. His first cap came aged just 19 in a defeat to the Netherlands in December 1935 (a game that also featured Dundalk's Joey Donnelly), after which 'Socaro' of the Irish Press wrote: "The score at the end was 5–3 - but for that small margin thanks, in the most lavish terms, are due to O'Neill, our right full back... [He] was brilliant." The outbreak of World War II cut short O'Neill's international career when he was just 23 years old. A 1–1 draw away to Germany was his 11th and last cap in Ireland's final match before the war, a game that saw two Dundalk full-backs play (the other being Mick Hoy). By the time Ireland played again he had already retired from football, aged 28. O'Neill never won a League title at Dundalk but did receive winner's medals in the club's first four cup victories, including the 'jinx' breaking FAI Cup victory of 1942. His record with Ireland: won 5; drew 4; lost 2 – and only two other League of Ireland players have made more international appearances.

=== Jimmy Hasty ===
One of Jim McLaughlin's first tasks at Dundalk, after being appointed player-manager, was to play in a Dundalk-Drogheda selection for the Jimmy Hasty benefit match in Oriel Park on 13 December 1974. A favourite of Dundalk supporters in the first half of the 1960s, Hasty had been murdered in a sectarian shooting near his home in Belfast on 11 October.

Jimmy Hasty (1936–1974) signed for Dundalk in November 1960, making a scoring debut against Cork Celtic at Oriel Park then, five weeks later on St. Stephen's Day, he scored the only goal in Dundalk's second Leinster Senior Cup final win. Hasty had lost his left arm in a factory accident aged 14. But his reputation as a goalscorer, who had learned to use his injury to his advantage on the pitch, had attracted Dundalk Director Jim Malone. When Malone saw Hasty play for Newry Town he was so confident in Hasty's ability that he personally guaranteed the cost of the transfer in front of a sceptical board. Hasty instantly became a star, however, with spectators flocking to grounds all over the League to see him play. By the time he had left the club in 1966, he had won League, Top Four Cup and Leinster Senior Cup medals. He was also the joint top-scorer in the 1963–64 season and had assisted the first goal and scored the second in the famous match in Zurich - the first away victory by an Irish side in European competition. He made 170 appearances over six seasons, scoring 103 goals (59 goals in 98 League appearances). His final goal in the League of Ireland came in February 1967, when he scored for Drogheda against Alan Fox's Dundalk side that would go on to win the League that season. In recent years Hasty has been the subject of documentaries on RTÉ, BBC, and UEFA.
