= History of Dundalk F.C. (2002–present) =

Dundalk
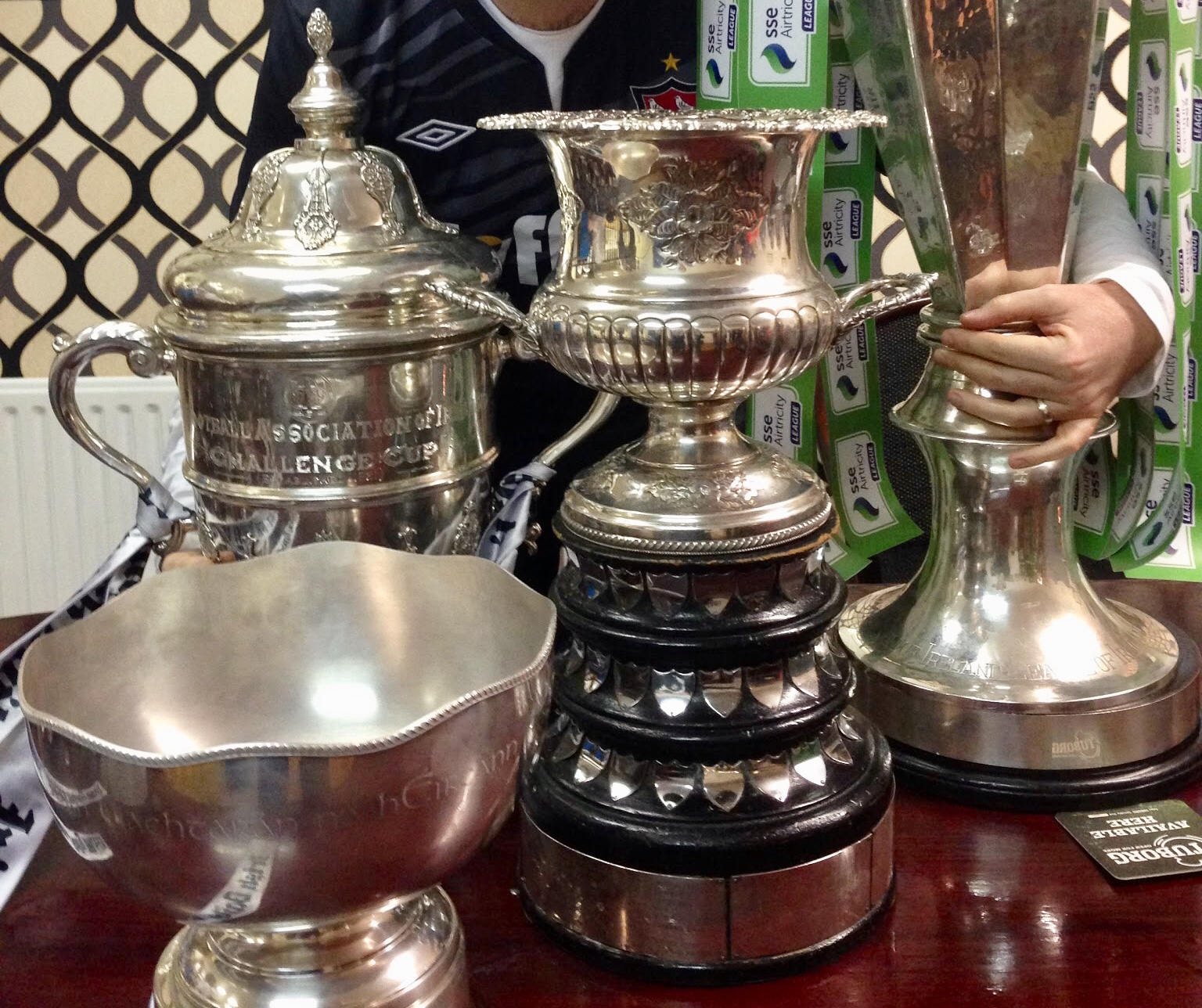
- President's Cup, FAI Cup, Leinster Senior Cup & League of Ireland Champions trophy on display in Oriel Park in 2015
- Founded: September 1903; 123 years ago as Dundalk G.N.R. Association Club
- League: League of Ireland Premier Division

The History of Dundalk Football Club (2002–present) covers the period from the aftermath of the 2001–02 season, when Dundalk had won the FAI Cup, but were also relegated to the League of Ireland First Division, to the end of the most recently completed season. It also includes short articles about some of the events that are an integral part of the club's recent history.

== In the doldrums (2002–2012) ==
Despite being relegated again, the 2002 FAI Cup win had restored a confidence in the club that had been absent since the early 1990s. But this confidence was short-lived. The 2002–03 season was a shortened season, which started in July, as the League of Ireland was transitioning to "summer soccer", and the short close season had seen the departure of some key players. Dundalk's reign as Cup holders lasted just 16 weeks, when they were knocked out in the first round of the second FAI Cup tournament to be played that calendar year. They were then outclassed in Europe by Varteks Varazdin in the qualifying round of the 2002–03 UEFA Cup. After a 5–0 defeat in Croatia, the return leg (played in Tolka Park in Dublin, due to Oriel Park not meeting UEFA's revised standards for stadiums) attracted just 410 supporters, who witnessed a 4–0 defeat. The poor form continued into the league, and manager Martin Murray resigned at the end of September, less than six months after the cup final victory.

The club turned to former Northern Ireland international and Linfield manager, Trevor Anderson. But results continued to deteriorate and the club slipped further down the table, finishing 10th the following season – 20th in the Irish football pyramid – the club's worst ever season. Anderson eventually resigned, along with a number of board members, after the 2004 season had started as poorly as the previous one had ended. He was replaced by former player Jim Gannon, and a mid-table finish followed. The membership-based 'co-op' ownership model had by now exhausted its funds, and the remaining board members decided to sell the club's training ground, Hiney Park, in the summer of 2005 in order to service debts and pay for work at Oriel Park, including the installation of an artificial pitch, which, it was hoped, would bring in additional revenue. But by the end of the season the club had again finished in mid-table, and the board saw more resignations, with Gannon also quitting.

The co-op was now exhausted, and the members agreed to the club being taken back into private ownership by its CEO, Gerry Matthews. With new investment, Dundalk finished second in 2006 under new manager John Gill, securing a play-off tie against Waterford United. But, even though they won the play-off, they were still denied a place in the 2007 Premier Division, with Galway United (who had finished third in that season's First Division) selected by the FAI's 2006 IAG Report to be promoted ahead of both Dundalk and Waterford. On the opening night of the 2007 season, Dundalk celebrated their 2,000th League match in the League of Ireland with a 3–2 victory over Finn Harps in Oriel Park. But they could only manage to finish in a play-off position, then lost in the play-off to Finn Harps, who went on to be promoted. The following season they won promotion back to the Premier Division, after yet more final day drama – defeating Kildare County in Kildare, then waiting to hear the result of the match between Shelbourne and Limerick 37. Shelbourne, Dundalk's challengers, conceded an injury time equaliser to send Dundalk up as Champions. Controversially, Gill was let go, however, despite winning the First Division title.

At first, Dundalk consolidated their position back in the Premier Division and qualified for the 2010–11 Europa League. Under Ian Foster, they won the first European match played in Oriel Park since 1991, and lead the league table midway through the 2010 season. The following year, they again went into the summer challenging at the top, and reached the 2011 Setanta Sports Cup final. But after losing the final, and with the playing budget already being restricted, results subsequently deteriorated as the season drew to a close. Financial losses were mounting, and Matthews decided to relinquish control of the club. Foster's contract expired and he was allowed to leave, and they spent the 2012 season rooted in the relegation play-off spot, as the scale of the financial problems threatened to put the club of business altogether. The withdrawal of Monaghan United from the League, however, meant that automatic relegation would be avoided. Matthews put the club up for sale, and, with the assistance of a Supporters Trust, it was taken over by local businessmen Andy Connolly and Paul Brown (owners of the team's official sponsors, Fastfix). They subsequently managed to remain in the top-flight by defeating Waterford United in the play-off.

== Revival and dominance (2013–2020) ==
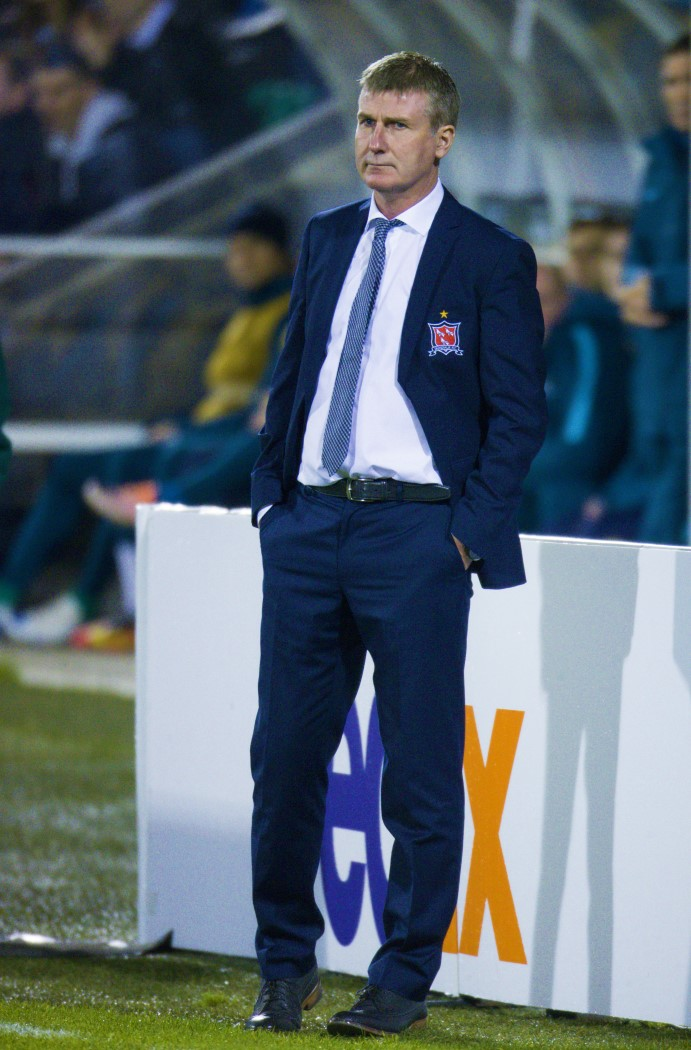
Stephen Kenny, Dundalk manager 2013–2018

With the takeover complete and the club saved, the new owners turned to Stephen Kenny - out of work since being sacked by Shamrock Rovers - to become the new manager. He set about rebuilding the squad, with only four of the 32 players who made League appearances in 2012 retained. He had a limited budget, so focused on signing unheralded players from outside the top clubs, and players who had been released, for example Richie Towell, who had been released by Celtic, and Stephen O'Donnell, who had considerable success at Shamrock Rovers but was considering leaving the game. When the 2013 season started neither supporters nor pundits were sure what to expect, and Dundalk failed to win any of the first five home matches. But with Kenny's team clicking into gear as his ideas took hold, they rose up the table to the most unlikely of title challenges, eventually finishing second - a defeat to eventual champions St. Patrick's Athletic ultimately costing them the title.

Kenny kept the nucleus of the side together and made some more additions for the following season and Dundalk went on a charge to the top of the table, including dishing out a thrashing to defending champions St. Patrick's Athletic in Richmond Park. He went on to guide the club to its first League title since 1995 after final day drama yet again, with Dundalk defeating title rivals Cork City 2–0 in Oriel Park. Dundalk also won that season's League Cup, the club's first League and League Cup Double. The 2015 season saw them dominate, winning the club's third League and FAI Cup Double, losing only one match in the process, three years after the financial and ownership issues that had threatened its existence. A third league title in a row was sealed with two games to spare in 2016, and Kenny's team made history the same season by being the first Irish side to gain a point, and then to win a match, in the group stage of European competition.

In 2017, after the Europa League run, they won the League Cup again, defeating Shamrock Rovers in the final. But the departure of some key players, and a slow start, meant they slipped to runners-up spots in both league and FAI Cup. However the club's European form had attracted interest from abroad, and a consortium of American investors, backed by sports-investors Peak6, completed a takeover in January 2018. Kenny's side reasserted itself in 2018, winning another League and Cup Double – the second under Kenny and fourth in the club's history – breaking points-total and goals scored-total records in the process. In the aftermath, the FAI moved to offer Kenny the Republic of Ireland U-21 manager's role, and he resigned at the end of November in order to accept the position.

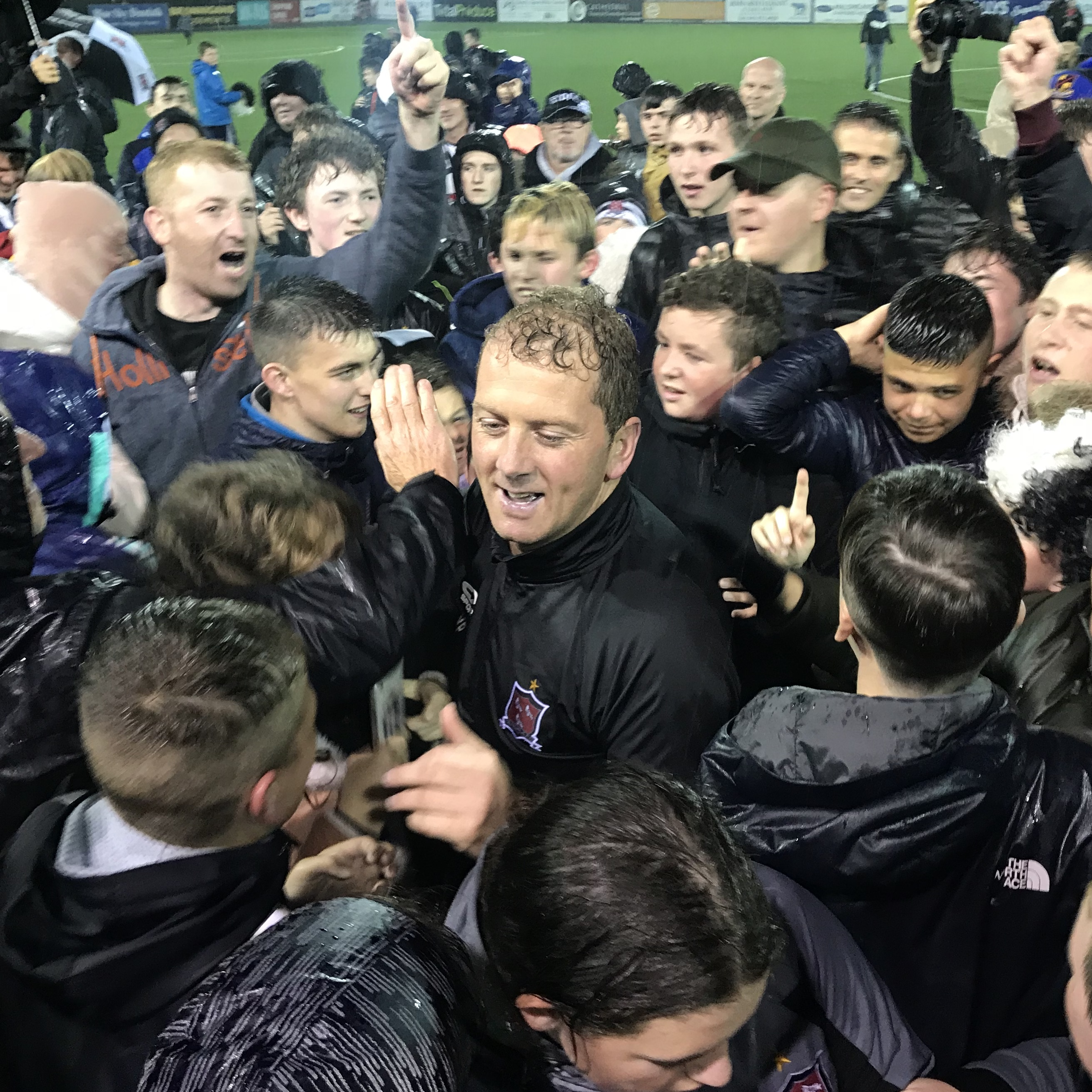
Vinny Perth, Dundalk manager, celebrating the 2019 league title success with supporters in Oriel Park.

Hoping to achieve continuity, and with the majority of the first-team signed to longer-term contracts, the new owners replaced Kenny with his Assistant Manager since 2013, Vinny Perth, as Head Coach, with John Gill returning as First Team Coach. The new management team had immediate success, winning the season opening President's Cup. In the League they fell 13-points behind early leaders Shamrock Rovers in April, which saw Rovers being called "title-winners in waiting", but they overhauled the deficit within weeks, and subsequently won the club's 14th league title with four games to spare. They also won the League Cup by defeating Derry City on penalties in the final, to secure a second League and League Cup Double. Chasing their first domestic Treble, which had only been won once since the introduction of the League of Ireland Cup in 1973–74, they were beaten in a penalty shoot-out in the FAI Cup Final by Shamrock Rovers. But they ended the season with a comprehensive 7–1 aggregate victory over Northern Irish champions, Linfield, in the inaugural Champions Cup.

Early the following season, a goal scored by Jordan Flores went viral, and was subsequently nominated for the FIFA Puskás Award. The outbreak of the COVID-19 pandemic saw the cessation of football in line with other European countries soon after. The League of Ireland Cup was deferred for the season, while the Leinster Senior Cup was abandoned. The league season resumed in July behind closed doors with a reduced schedule of 18 matches in total. Dundalk suffered a loss of form, and in Europe they were defeated by Celje in the 2020–21 UEFA Champions League first qualifying round. In the aftermath of that defeat, manager Vinny Perth was sacked by the club. He was replaced by Italian Filippo Giovagnoli.

They dropped into the Europa League second qualifying round, and defeated Inter Club d'Escaldes, Sheriff Tiraspol, and KÍ of Klaksvík in the Faroe Islands to qualify for the Europa League group stages. They were seeded fourth for the group stage and were drawn in Group B alongside Arsenal, Rapid Wien, and Molde. In the first match at home to Molde, Dundalk took a first half lead through Sean Murray, before going down 2–1. Following a 3–0 to Arsenal at the Emirates Stadium, they took the lead away to Rapid in Vienna on Matchday 3, which finished 4–3 to the home side. They failed to pick up any points from the second set of matches, and finished bottom of the group on 0 points. They also received a €50,000 fine from Uefa for 'shadow coaching', as interim head coach Filippo Giovagnoli did not hold a Uefa Pro Licence.

Meanwhile, they had struggled in the league and eventually finished third, thus qualifying for the new UEFA Europa Conference League. In the FAI Cup, which also had a schedule change as a result of the pandemic, they reached the final after wins over Waterford, Cobh Ramblers, Bohemians, and Athlone Town. The 11–0 semi-final victory over Athlone Town saw Dundalk set a new record for the biggest win in the competition's history, and was also a new club record victory. They followed that with a 4–2 extra time victory over the holders, Shamrock Rovers, with David McMillan scoring a hat-trick, to win the Cup for the twelfth time.

== Upheaval (2021–present) ==
The 2021 season saw Shane Keegan named first-team manager with Giovagnoli reverting to the position of 'coach' because the latter had been unable to secure a place on a UEFA Pro Licence course. The season began with a victory in the President's Cup, but after a run of defeats at the start of the league campaign, both Keegan and Giovagnoli left the club. After a period where new Sporting Director Jim Magilton took charge, Vinny Perth returned to the club as head coach in June. Dundalk struggled for the remainder of the domestic season with their lowest league finish since 2012 and went out to Vitesse Arnhem, 4–3 on aggregate, in the third qualifying round of the inaugural Europa Conference League. Before the season ended, the club was returned to local ownership when a consortium led by former co-owner Andy Connolly and sports technology firm STATSports agreed a takeover with Peak6.

The new owners then installed former captain Stephen O'Donnell as the club's new head coach in the close season. O'Donnell steered his new-look side to a third place finish and qualification for the Europa Conference League at the first attempt. They failed to capitalise in the 2023 season, exiting the Conference League in the second qualifying round and finishing mid-table and outside the European qualification places.

The club's finances were quickly deteriorating and there was another change of ownership in the close season, when it was taken over by a US-based Irish businessman, Brian Ainscough. A poor start to the 2024 season, which saw Dundalk at the foot of the table with no wins after eight matches, resulted in O'Donnell being let go. He was replaced on an interim basis by the club's Head of Football operations, Brian Gartland, and first team coach, Liam Burns. Noel King, a former player of the club, was subsequently named manager on 20 April, an appointment widely derided by the club's supporters. His tenure lasted 25 days before he resigned, citing medical issues. Brian Gartland was sacked during that period, following a clash with the owner over King's appointment, ending an 11-year association with Dundalk. Gartland later sued the club for wrongful dismissal and on 29 January 2025, it was ordered by the Workplace Relations Commission to pay him a sum of €64,434 in relation to three separate workplace breaches.

The club hired Jon Daly to replace King and there was a brief improvement in form. However, in September, after several defeats and with seven games left to play, Daly confirmed that players and staff at the club had not been paid. It was subsequently revealed that the club had amassed losses of €1.2 million to the end of 2023 and was in danger of insolvency before the end of the season. Ainscough passed control of the holding company to a Dundalk-based barrister, John Temple, which avoided a mid-season withdrawal from the league. The concurrent collapse in form was not halted and relegation was confirmed before the end of the season, with Daly leaving after the final match.

Ciarán Kilduff, who had played for the club during Stephen Kenny's reign, was named the new manager within days, and the club was belatedly awarded a licence to compete in the 2025 League of Ireland First Division, following Temple's efforts to get the debt situation under control, thus avoiding examinership. Dundalk led the way from the start in 2025, and sealed the title with one game to spare with a 3–0 win over Finn Harps in front of 3,358 spectators. They ended the season by winning the Leinster Senior Cup for the eighth time.

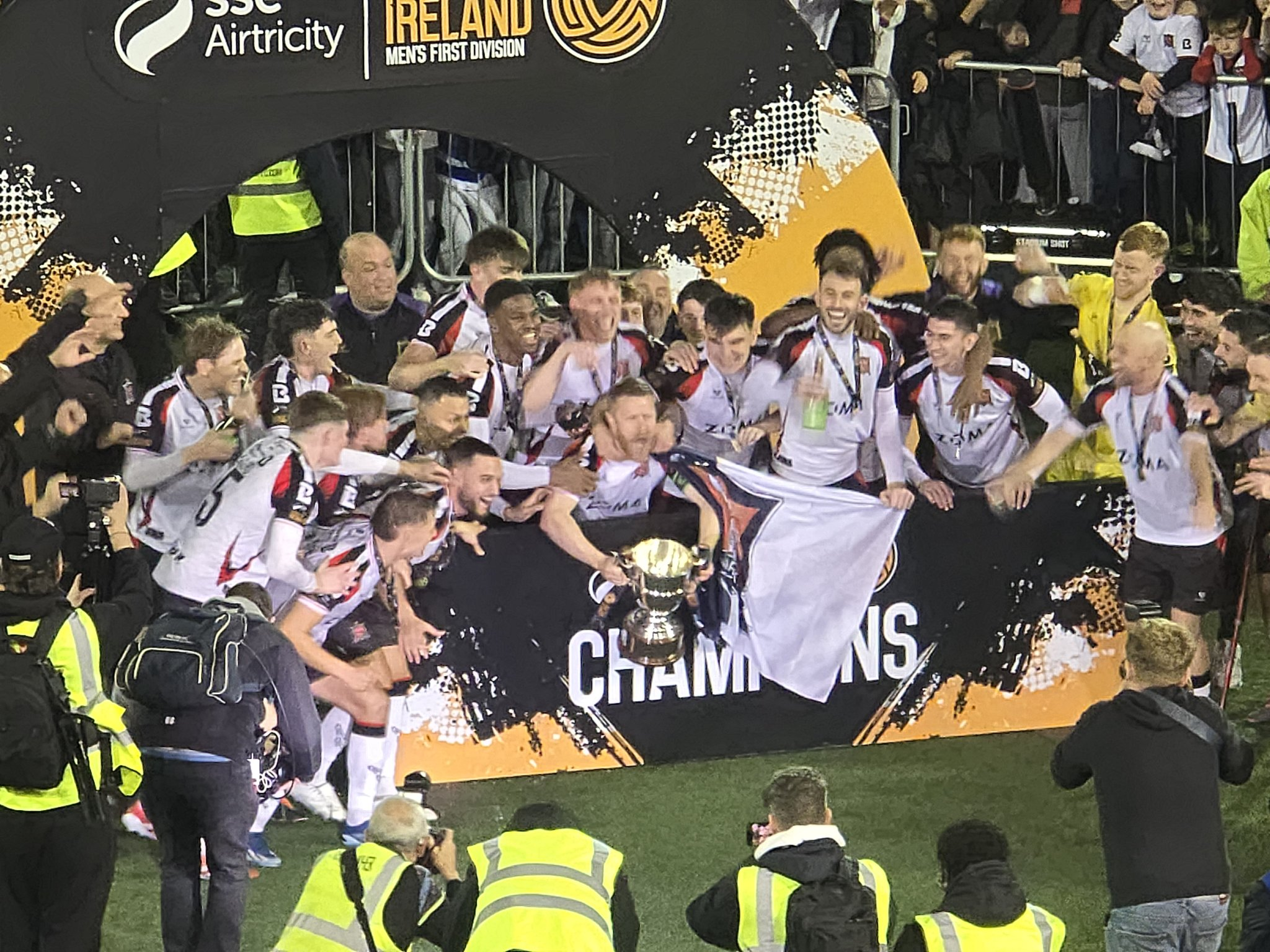
Dundalk win the 2025 League of Ireland First Division

== The anatomy of Dundalk: a history in stubs ==
=== 2006 IAG Report ===
Dundalk being excluded from the 2007 Premier Division was as a result of the FAI implementing the recommendations of the Independent Assessment Group, which used a point-system consisting of off-field metrics as well as results from the previous five seasons to decide which teams should make up the top-tier. Dundalk were rated joint-eighth for the 'off-field' criteria but suffered on the 'on-field' metric used and failed to make the 12-team cut. Reports in the local and national press described the decision to exclude Dundalk from the Premier Division as "scandalous" and "an injustice".

That results from 2002 and 2003 could be used to deny the club promotion to the 2007 Premier Division infuriated many Dundalk supporters and proved to be the final straw for one particularly disgruntled fan, who entered the former headquarters of the Football Association of Ireland at Merrion Square, doused the reception area with petrol and threatened to set it alight. After a tense hour-long stand-off, the situation ended peacefully when the manager, John Gill, spoke with the fan and persuaded him to end his protest. Dundalk's owner, Gerry Matthews, met with the FAI and members of the IAG committee and subsequently acknowledged that the club were "happy to move on". Within three seasons Cork and Drogheda had gone into administration, Longford had been relegated on the back of failing to produce accounts, Derry and Cork had been relegated due to their holding companies going bankrupt, while Galway (who outscored Dundalk on the off-field criteria 389 - 348) would subsequently withdraw from the League of Ireland altogether in 2011 due to financial difficulties.

=== Circus ===
The period between Dundalk's return to the Premier Division in 2009 and the ownership crisis in 2012 was marked by several embarrassing incidents for the club. In May 2009 defender Dave Rogers was sacked by the board for dropping his shorts in front of visiting St Patrick's Athletic fans in Oriel Park which resulted in being sent off. Rogers won an unfair dismissal case, costing the club a 'five-figure' sum. Less than a year later the club was again forced to pay out following another unfair dismissal case, with a former marketing manager winning €40,000 at an Employment Appeals Tribunal. In July 2010 Neale Fenn, who had been signed from Bohemians at the start of the season, approached the club and requested that his contract be cancelled as he wished to retire from the game "for the good of his family". He also requested that his registration be returned to allow him play a "little bit of football". Dundalk manager Ian Foster agreed to Fenn's request, only for Fenn to sign for Shamrock Rovers four days later. Dundalk got a degree of satisfaction when Fenn and Shamrock Rovers visited Oriel Park in September and were thrashed 5–1, Fenn's replacement Matthew Tipton scoring a hat-trick on the night.

=== Pitch battle ===
During Stephen Kenny's reign a legal dispute arose between the new owners of the club and the previous owner, Gerry Matthews, over the lease of Oriel Park. After the transfer of the club to the new company Dundalk Town FC Limited in 2012, Matthews' company held onto the ground lease and retained ownership of the Youth Development Centre (YDC), built in 2010. This prevented the club's new owners from carrying out any more than basic maintenance and meant that the YDC remained unused. Matthews sought €250,000 from the club for the lease and the YDC, threatening to demolish the latter for scrap if there was no agreement. In addition some €430,000 in development levies remained owed to Louth County Council, which the new owners stated they should not be liable for. The dispute, which also involved the Casey family, as the situation was in breach of the terms of the lease, dragged on for over three years. It was eventually resolved in early 2017 and the club regained control of the ground lease.

=== 2024 financial crisis and fallout ===
The 2024 season was marked by a significant financial crisis that engulfed the club, which threatened to see it become insolvent before the end of the season. At the end of the 2021 season, when ownership of the club was transferred from the Peak6 consortium that had owned the club since 2018 to a local partnership of sports-technology firm STATSports and former owner Andy Connolly, the club’s financial position indicated a cash position of €1.4 million. By the end of the 2022 season, the cash position was €420,000 following an operating loss of €500,000 for the year. The 2023 season saw the financial position worsen considerably, with a loss of €1.47 million recorded. At the end of the 2023 season, the club was taken over by a US-based Irish businessman, Brian Ainscough. During the 2024 season the club’s financial position could not be improved, leading to an admission in September 2024 that players and staff had not been paid wages. Ainscough threatened to force the club into liquidation, but it had a last-minute reprieve, when a local barrister, John Temple, took it over. Following Temple's efforts to get the debt situation under control, thus avoiding examinership, the club was belatedly awarded a licence to compete in the 2025 League of Ireland First Division.
