= Oriel Park =

Football stadium in Dundalk, Ireland

- Páirc Airgíalla
- Home of Football
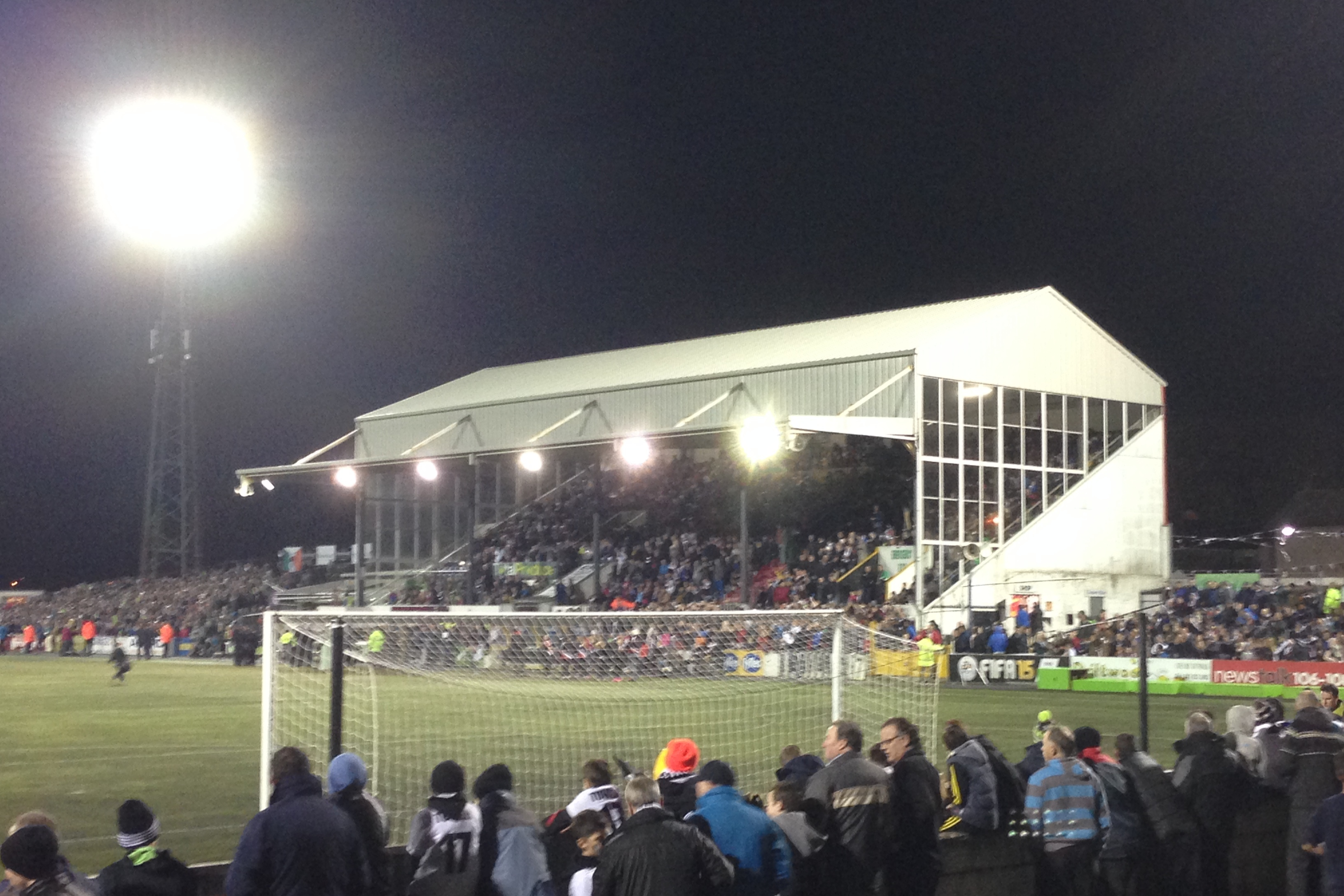
- Interactive map of Oriel Park
- Address: Oriel Park, Carrickmacross Road, Dundalk, County Louth, Ireland
- Coordinates: 54.0000°N 6.4166°W
- Owner: Casey Family Trust (land); Dundalk Town FC Ltd (stadium)
- Operator: Dundalk F.C.
- Capacity: 4,500 (Domestic); 3,100 (European)
- Type: Football stadium
- Surface: Grass (1919–2005); FieldTurf (2005–2016); Limonta Sport Max S (2017–2025); Fifa Quality Pro (2026– )
- Record attendance: 18,000 (Note: figures of 17,000 to 21,000 have been quoted for the European Cup tie against Celtic F.C. in 1979. However, due to the practice of recording 'gates' in monetary terms, the exact number in attendance at that match is unknown—as children and pensioners were charged lower prices or let in for free.) (Dundalk vs Tottenham Hotspur F.C., 1981–82 European Cup Winners' Cup).
- Field size: 70 m x 106 m
- Public transit: Dundalk railway station Bus Éireann Route 166

Construction
- Opened: 1919
- Renovated: 1936, 1966, 2010

Tenants
- Dundalk F.C. (1936–present)

Oriel Park is a UEFA Category 2 football stadium located on the Carrickmacross Road in Dundalk, Ireland. The stadium is the home ground of Dundalk Football Club and is owned and operated by the club on land that has been leased from the Casey Family Trust since 1936.

The ground has a capacity of 3,100 for European matches (i.e. 3,100 seats) and 4,500 for domestic games (i.e. with the remainder standing). Oriel Park's attendance record is an estimated 18,000, set in 1982 for Dundalk's European Cup Winners' Cup second round tie against Tottenham Hotspur F.C.

== Usage ==
Oriel Park is primarily used for Dundalk F.C. home matches and training and its facilities are also available for booking. The ground's public bar, 'The Lilywhite Lounge', is available for social events, as is the members' bar—the Enda McGuill Suite.

== Layout ==
Oriel Park has an all-weather pitch, the current pitch having been laid in 2026. There are two covered stands in the ground, one on either side of the pitch. The main stand on the Carrick Road side of the ground contains the dressing rooms, the club bars, offices, and club shop. The 'Shed', on the opposite side, houses the ground's commentary box and principle camera position. The Shed fronts the club's Youth Development Centre (YDC), which was built in 2010. There is uncovered seated terracing on either side of the main stand and standing room behind the eastern goal (the 'Town End'). There is an access road to the YDC behind the western goal (the 'Carrick End').

== Capacity ==
Following the major redevelopment carried out in 1966–67, the capacity of the ground was approximately 12,000. This was increased twice with extra terracing—in advance of the European tie against Celtic F.C. in 1979, and again in advance of the European tie against Tottenham Hotspur in 1981—so that the stated capacity of the ground reached approximately 22,000. This was all standing capacity with the exception of approximately 1,100 seats in the main stand. Since then, the capacity has been reduced over time due to the installation of additional seating, the construction of the ground's Youth Development Centre, and modern safety requirements, to give the current figures. The ground's capacity can be increased to approximately 5,000 for domestic matches using temporary seating, as was the case for the 2014 League decider.

== Transport ==
Oriel Park and Dundalk railway station on Carrickmacross Road

Oriel Park is serviced by Dundalk-Clarke railway station on the Belfast-Dublin line, which is 500 metres from the ground. Dundalk bus terminus is located 1.5 km from the ground. Bus route 166 from Dundalk bus terminus to Carrickmacross stops at the railway station. By road, Oriel Park is reached from the south via Exit 16 off the M1 and the Ardee Road (R171); and from the north via Exit 17 off the M1 and the Castleblaney Road (N53). There is no exit from the motorway onto the Carrickmacross Road (R178). Paid car parking is available at the railway station. Limited on-street parking is also available within walking distance.

== History ==
In 1919, land owned by the Casey family, known as 'Casey’s Field', was made available for junior football matches in the new Dundalk & District League by the League's founder, P.J. Casey. Casey, at the time the Secretary of local junior club Dundalk Town, subsequently joined the management committee of Dundalk G.N.R., before becoming Treasurer of the League of Ireland in 1932. With Casey's assistance, Dundalk F.C. moved to Casey's Field on a long-term lease, where the club has remained to date. The club named their new ground 'Oriel Park' after the medieval Irish kingdom of Airgíalla. Almost 10 years to the day after Dundalk had played their first League of Ireland match away to Fordsons, the same club (as Cork F.C.) were the first visitors to Oriel Park, with Dundalk winning 2–1.

In 2022, following the death of Des Casey (the club's Honorary President), the club renamed the ground 'Casey's Field' in his honour until the end of that season.

=== Ground developments ===
Oriel Park started as little more than a field with a slope. The ground was levelled and workmen from the Great Northern Railway works in the town supplied fencing and rudimentary terracing made from sleepers. Offices and changing rooms were repurposed railway carriages. But over the years the club endeavoured to improve what was theirs, often at considerable financial risk:

- 1936: Capital expenditure on the preparation of the new ground stated to be £987 19s. 9d. at the club's annual meeting.
- 1940: The first new stand was completed, funded by members' subscription.
- 1944: A fire, believed to have been maliciously started, destroys dressing rooms and contents including playing kits for all the club's teams.
- 1948: With funds coming in from the transfer of players to England, the Stand was enlarged and covered terracing extended. Capital expenditure totalled £2,153 (approximately €85,000 in 2019).
- 1966: By the mid 1960s, the ground was in need of modernisation and the members-based ownership, which saw the club break even on an annual basis at best, could not provide the finance required to do it. The club was converted to a Public Limited Company and, as part of a substantial subsequent investment, the pitch was turned 90 degrees, and a new stand incorporating changing rooms, offices and bar facilities was built.
- 1967: Floodlights were installed—the first match under lights being a 1967–68 European Cup tie against Vasas SC of Budapest. The capital debt for the work from 1966 to 1968 reached £51,000 (equivalent to approximately €1.1 million in 2019).
- 1979: For the European Cup tie with Celtic, £20,000 (equivalent to €105,000 in 2019) was invested to increase the terraced capacity of the ground to approximately 19,000. The stated capacity reached approximately 22,000 by 1981.
- 1982: In advance of their European Cup tie with Liverpool in 1982, the club spent £40,000 (equivalent to approximately €130,000 in 2019) on a programme of terrace repairs and ground improvements.
- 1989: £23,000 of capital expenditure was invested on press facilities and terrace upgrades (equivalent to €51,000 in 2019).
- 1995: Improvements to the pitch, stand, training pitch and bar and office facilities were completed, eventually totalling approximately £300,000 (equivalent to approximately €600,000 in 2019). Some of this funding came from National Lottery grants. £40,000 came from fundraising by the Dundalk F.C. Supporters' Club.
- 2005: In order to reduce the costs of grass-pitch maintenance and to provide an additional source of income for the club, a new all-weather pitch was installed, with total cost, including associated ground works, of an estimated €1.5 million. Approximately €1 million of this came from grants. The upgrades required the sale of the club's training ground, Hiney Park, to provide funding.
- 2006–2010: After being obliged to play the home leg of the 2002/03 UEFA Cup qualifying round tie in Tolka Park, approximately €1 million was spent on the improvements required to meet licensing standards and UEFA Category 2 stadium standards to permit European matches to return to the ground. The all-weather pitch was upgraded in 2009 in the process.
- 2010: Youth Development Centre and underground car park built at a cost of €3,800,000.
- 2017: New all-weather pitch installed, replacing 2009 pitch, to ensure the stadium continued to meet UEFA Category 2 standards. This allowed the hosting of a UEFA Champions League match during the 2017–18 season.
- 2019: Approximately €500,000 spent upgrading the YDC to support Team Operations.

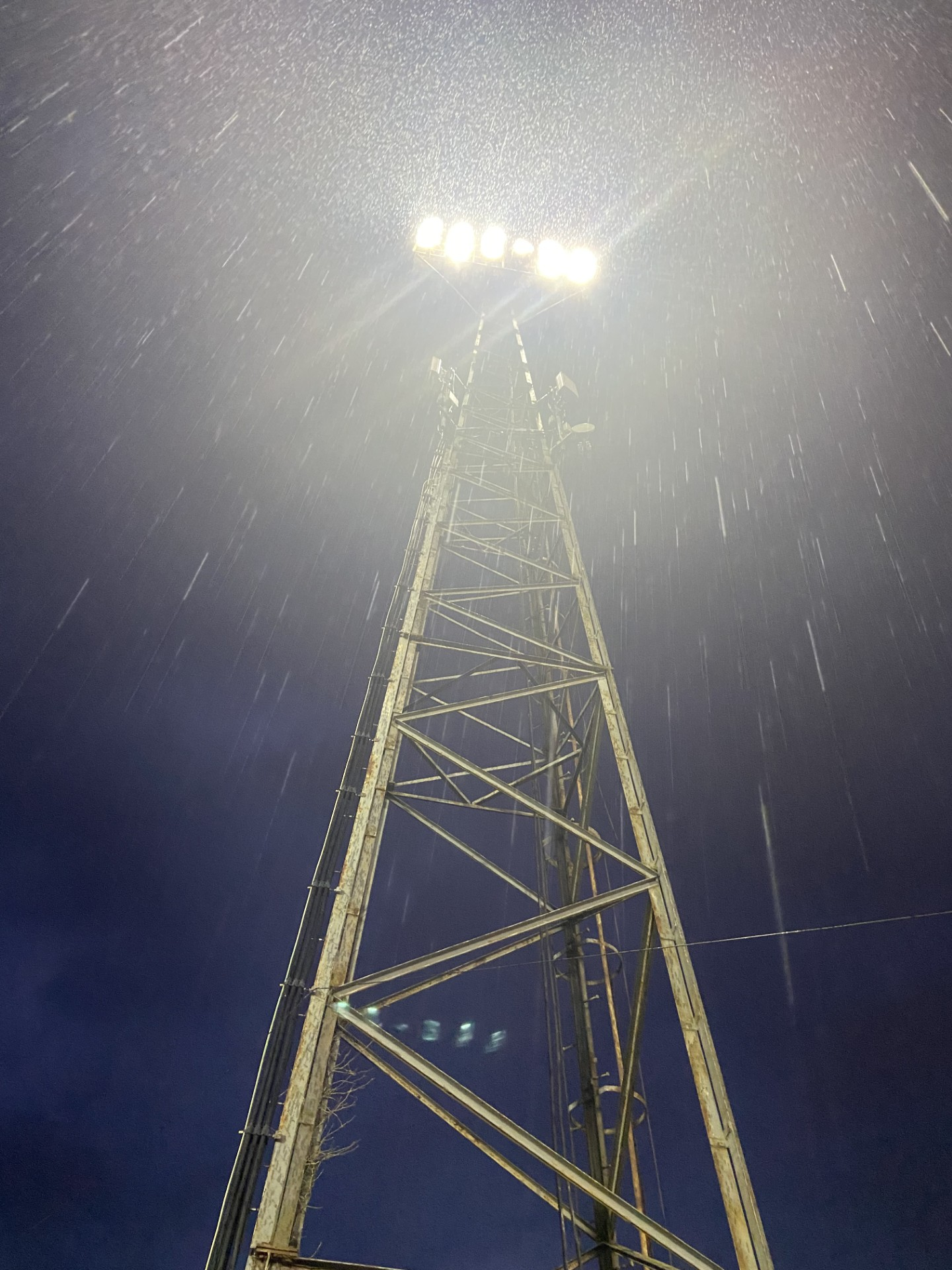
Oriel Park floodlight 2023

- 2026: Approximately €800,000 spent replacing the 2017 artificial pitch and upgrading the floodlights to meet Premier Division licensing requirements. €70,000 funding was supplied by the Dundalk FC Trust and up to €500,000 in grant funding was made available by the government.

=== Legal issues ===
In 2014, a legal dispute arose between the new owners of Dundalk and the previous owner, Gerry Matthews, over the lease of the ground. After the transfer of the club to the new company Dundalk Town FC Limited in 2012, Matthews' company held onto the ground lease and retained ownership of the Youth Development Centre (YDC), built in 2010. This prevented the club's new owners from carrying out any more than basic maintenance at the ground and also meant that the YDC remained unused. Matthews sought €250,000 from the club for the lease and the YDC, threatening to demolish the latter for scrap if there was no agreement. In addition, some €430,000 in development levies remained owed to Louth County Council, which the new owners stated they should not be liable for. The dispute, which also involved the Casey Family Trust, as the situation was in breach of the terms of the lease, lasted for over three years. It was eventually resolved in early 2017 and the club regained control of the ground lease.

== Notable matches & events ==
=== Football ===
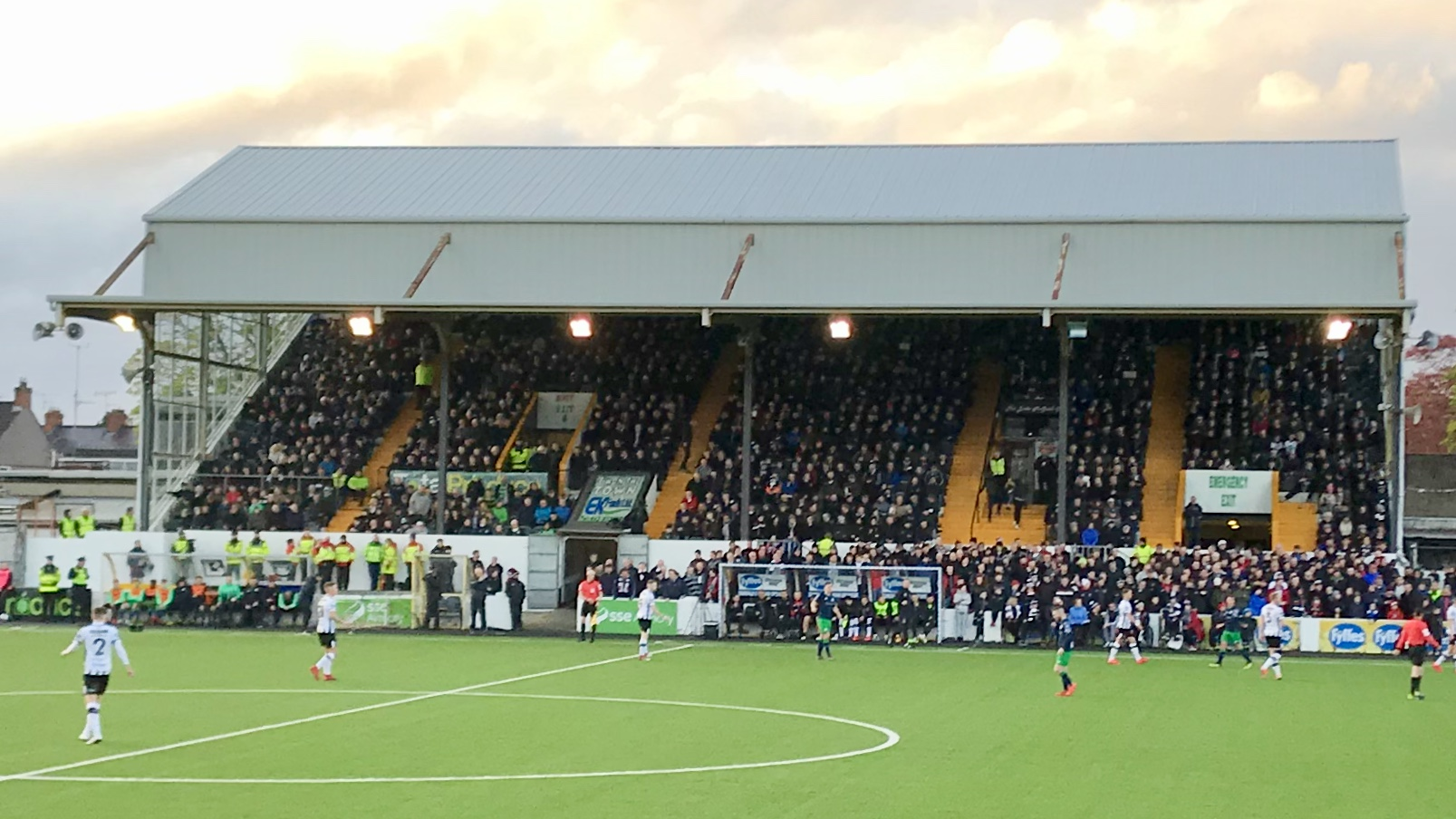
Oriel Park, Dundalk

(the following is in addition to notable Dundalk F.C. competitive matches)

- 13 December 1974: Jimmy Hasty Benefit, Dundalk & Drogheda Selection v. Dave Bacuzzi Dublin Selection.
- 16 March 1977: Inter-League Challenge, League of Ireland v. Italian League Selection.
- 30 March 1978: Brian McConville Benefit, Jim McLaughlin Selection v. Johnny Giles Selection.
- 19 October 1978: 1978–79 European Cup, Bohemians 0–0 Dynamo Dresden (Bohemians had been banned from using Dalymount Park because of crowd trouble when Newcastle United had visited for a UEFA Cup tie a year previously.
- 2 September 1980: Liam Devine Benefit, Dundalk Selection v. Soccer Writers 'Team of the Year' XI.
- 14 October 1986: 1988 European U-21 Championship Qualifier, Ireland 1–2 Scotland.
- 5 June 1989: Barry Kehoe Testimonial, Jack Charlton International XI v. Barry Kehoe Selection.
- 24 April 1990: Under-21 International Friendly, Ireland 1–1 Malta.
- 30 April 1991: 1992 European U-21 Championship Qualifier, Ireland 1–2 Poland.
- 15 November 1993: In advance of a World Cup Qualifier in Belfast against Northern Ireland, Jack Charlton's Republic of Ireland side held an open training session in the ground.
- April 1994: Three group-stage matches were hosted in the 1994 UEFA European Under-16 Football Championship.
- June 1996: The Croatia squad for Euro '96 (which was held in England) based themselves in Carrickmacross prior to the tournament and held daily open training sessions in the ground.
- 29 October 1999: 2000 UEFA European Under-16 Championship Qualifying Stage, Sweden v. Switzerland.
- 25 March 2013: Under-21 International Friendly, Ireland 1–2 Portugal.

=== Other sports ===
- 1974: Stock Car Racing Irish Championship.
- 1978: Tug of War World Championship.
- 1983: Tug of War European Championship.
- 2010: European Seniors Badminton Championship (in Youth Development Centre).

== Gallery ==
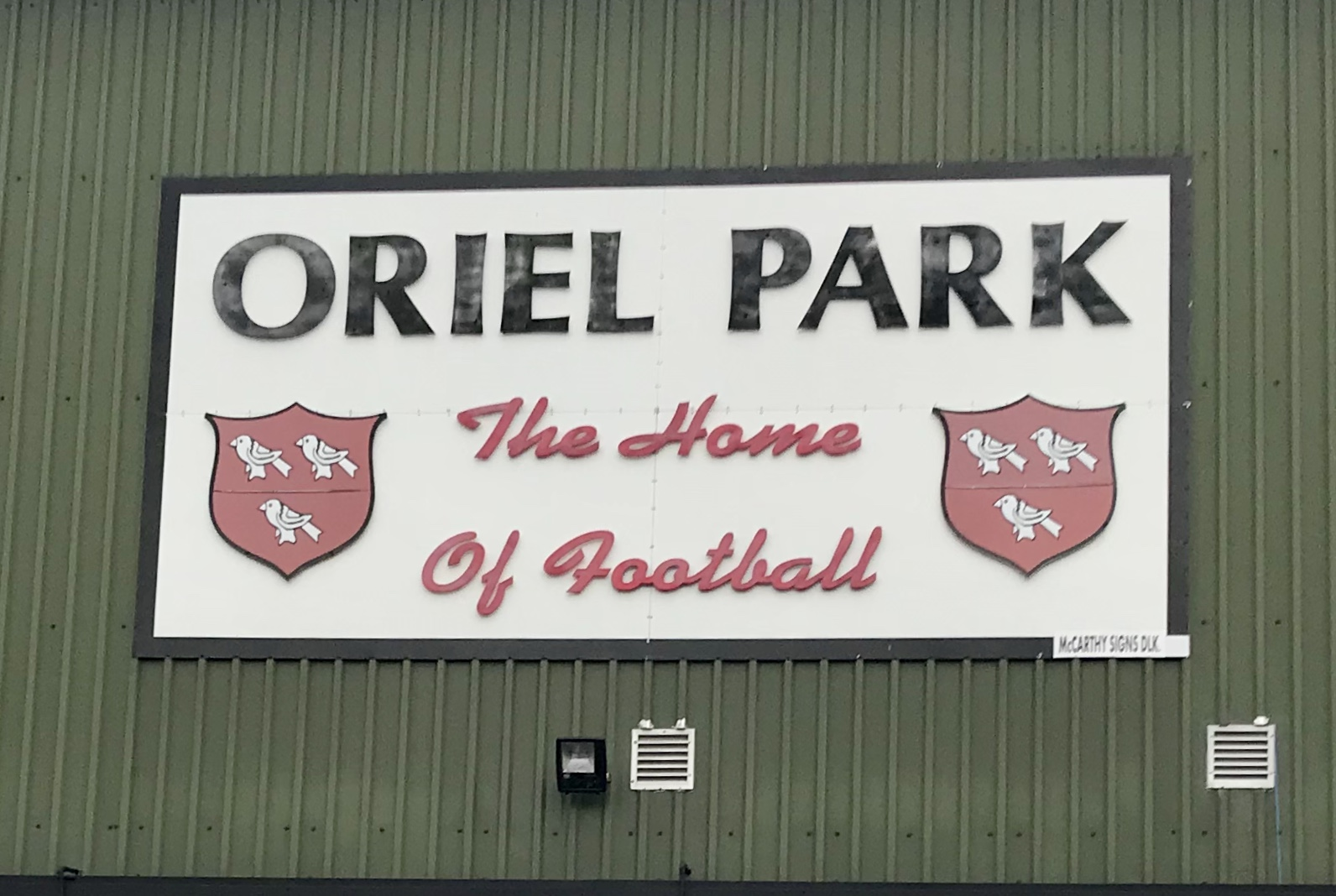
The Home of Football

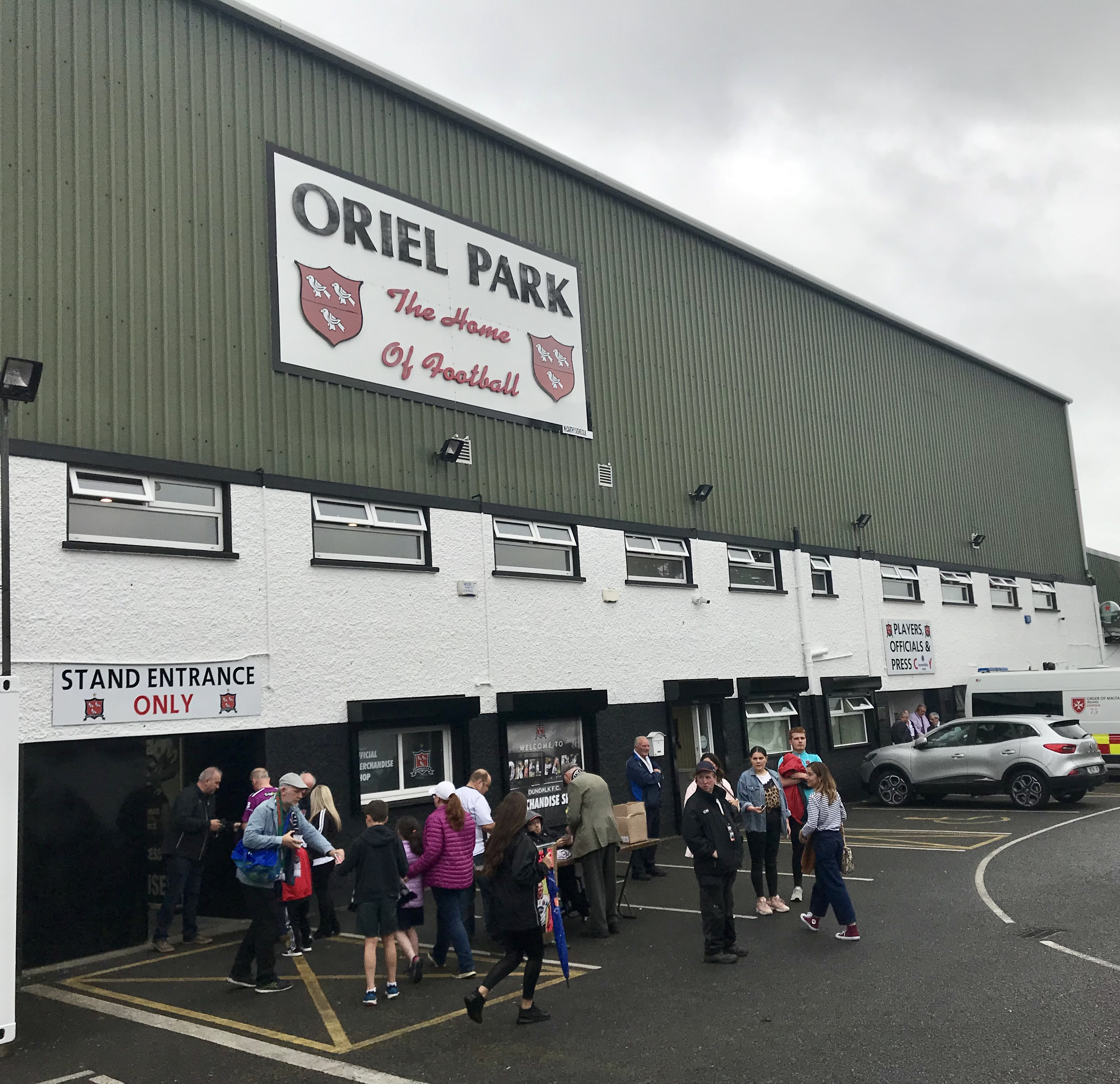
Ground entrance

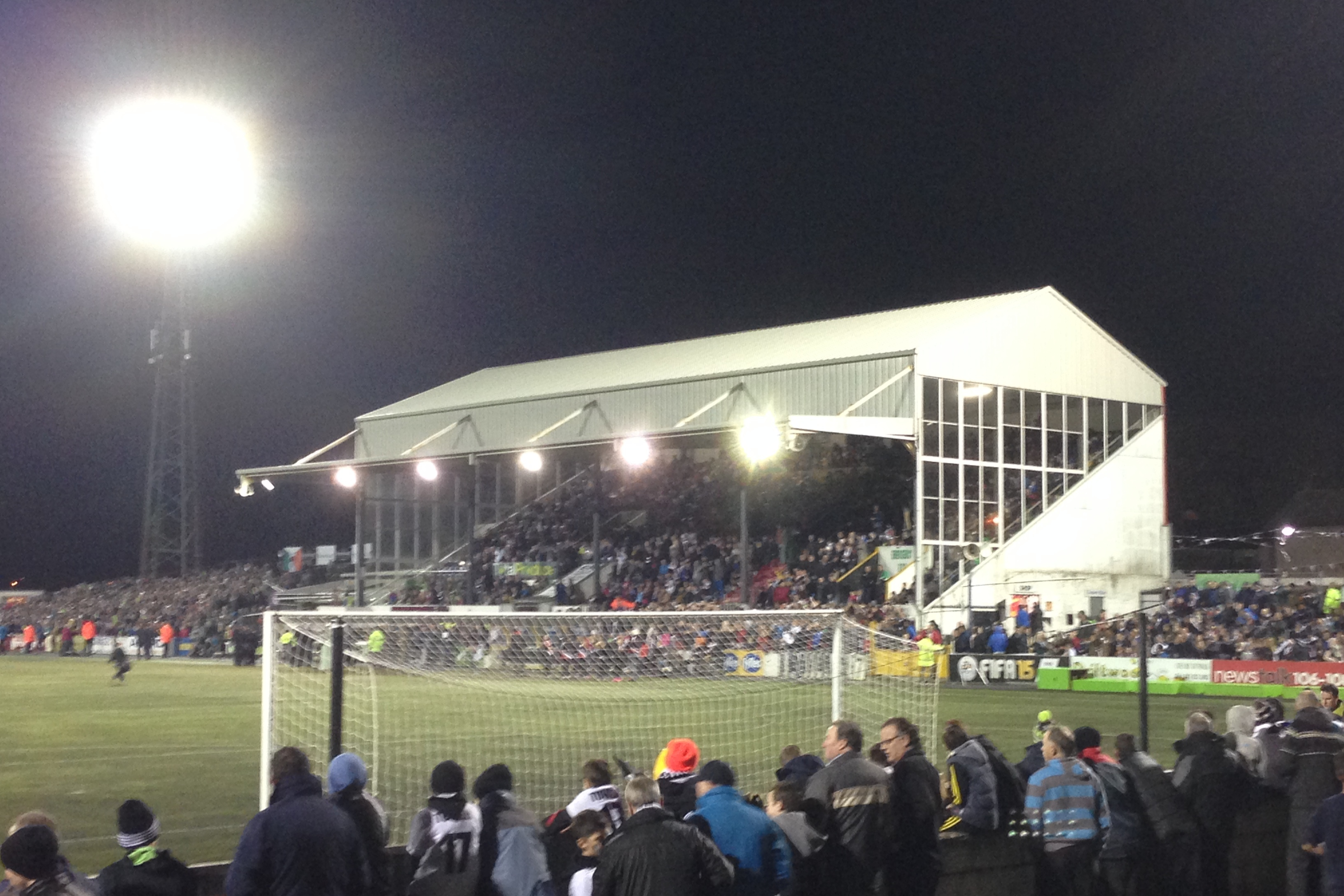
Main Stand match night

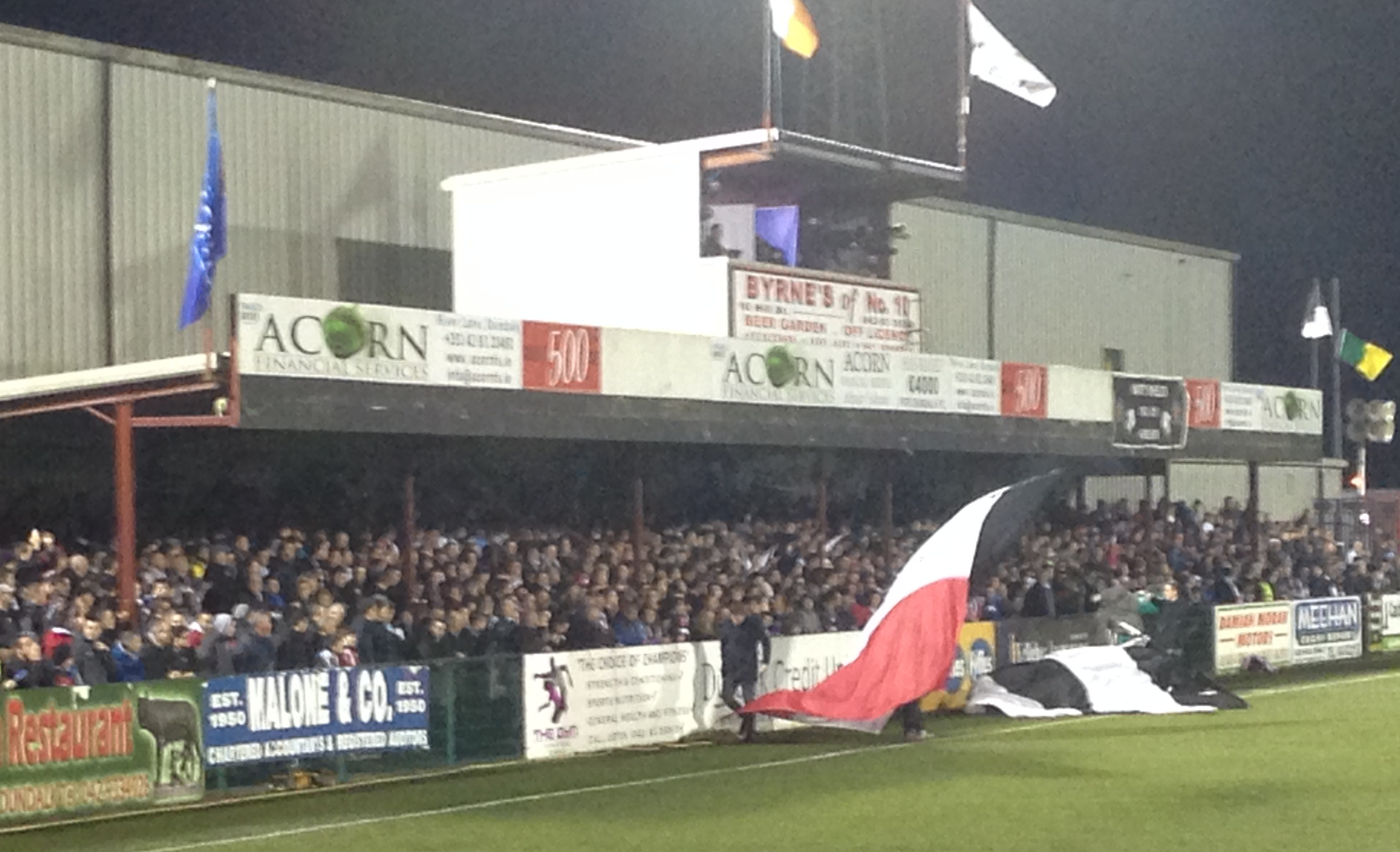
Shedside match night

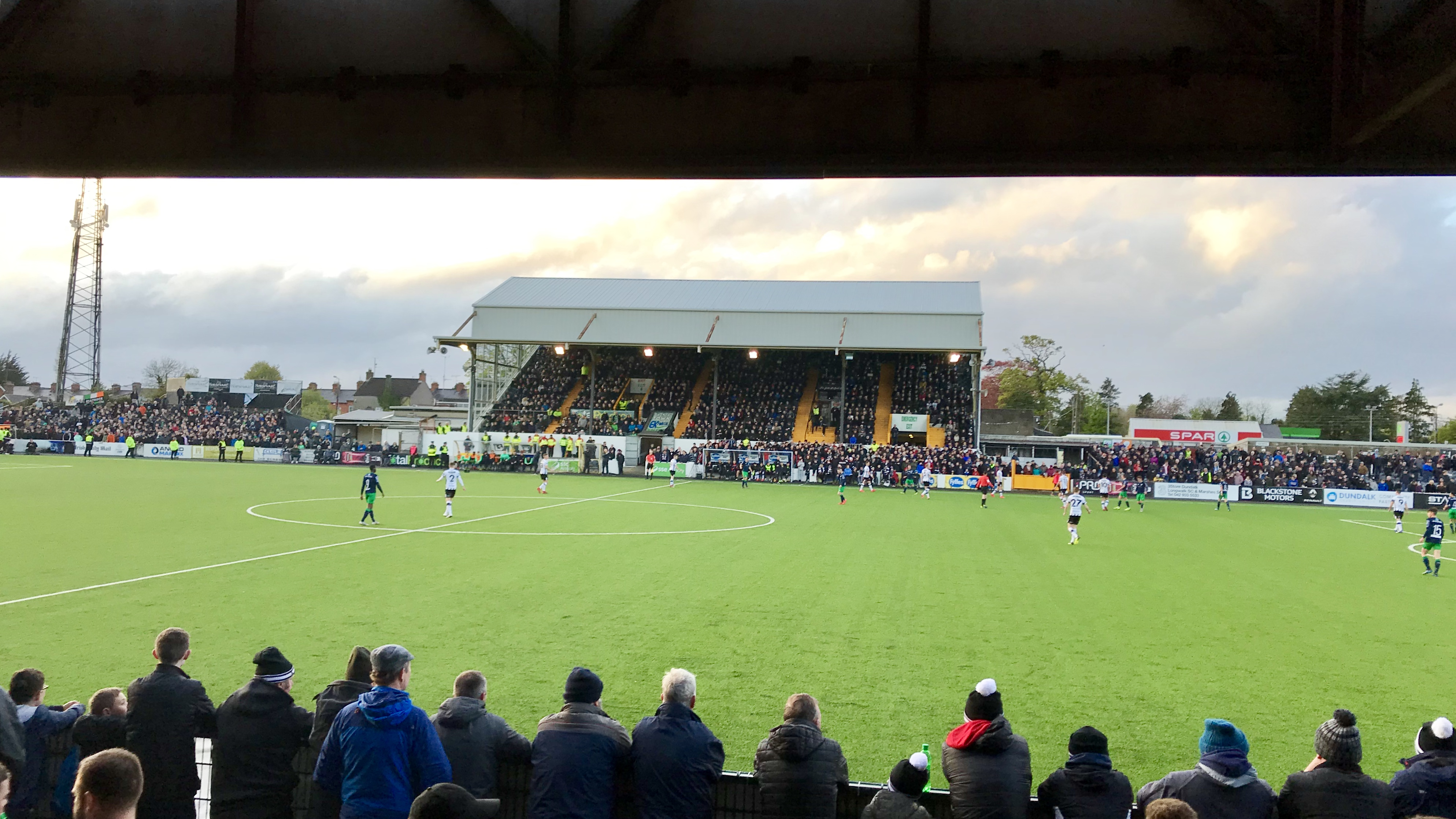
Stand view from Shedside

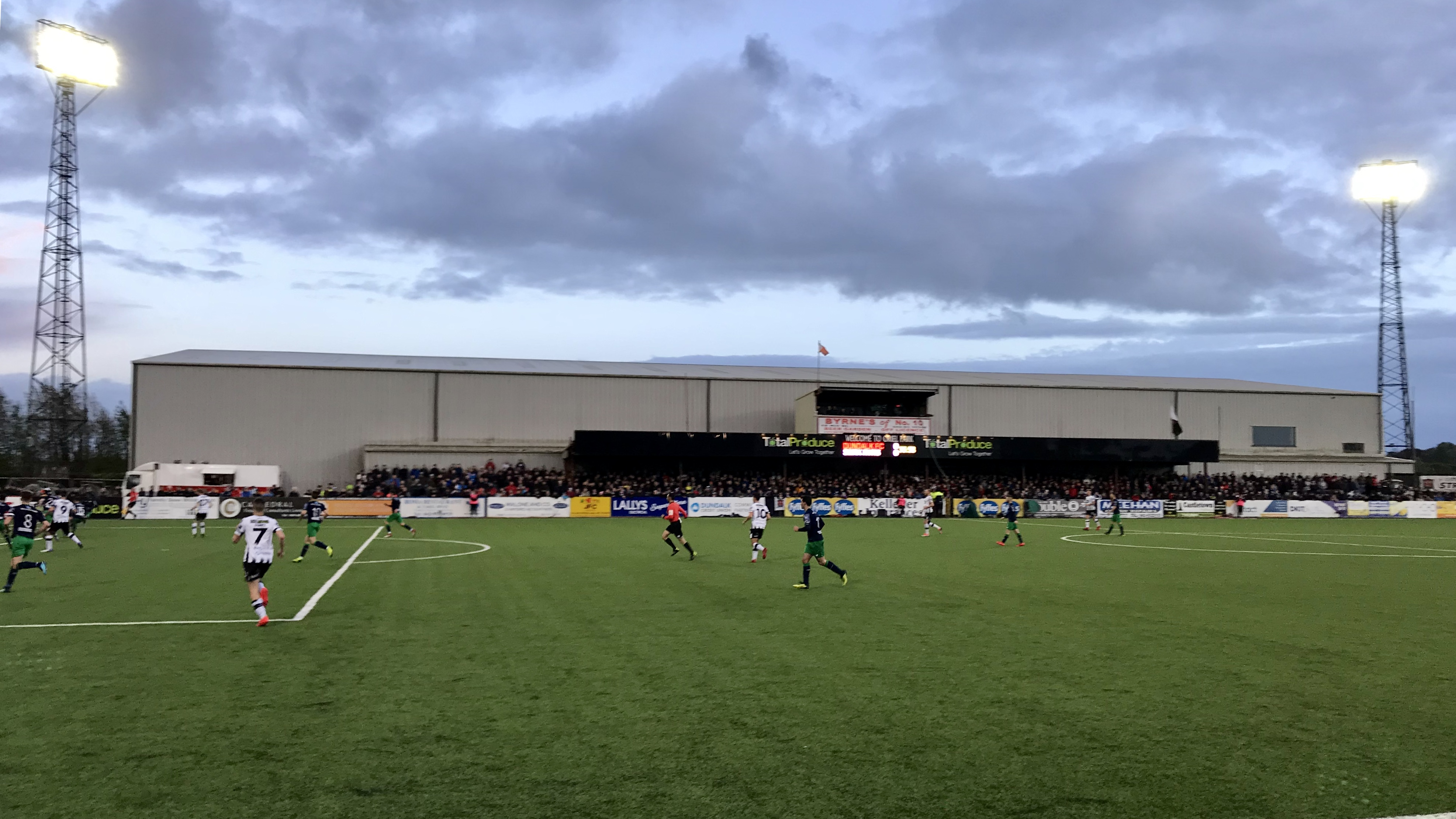
Shed view from Standside

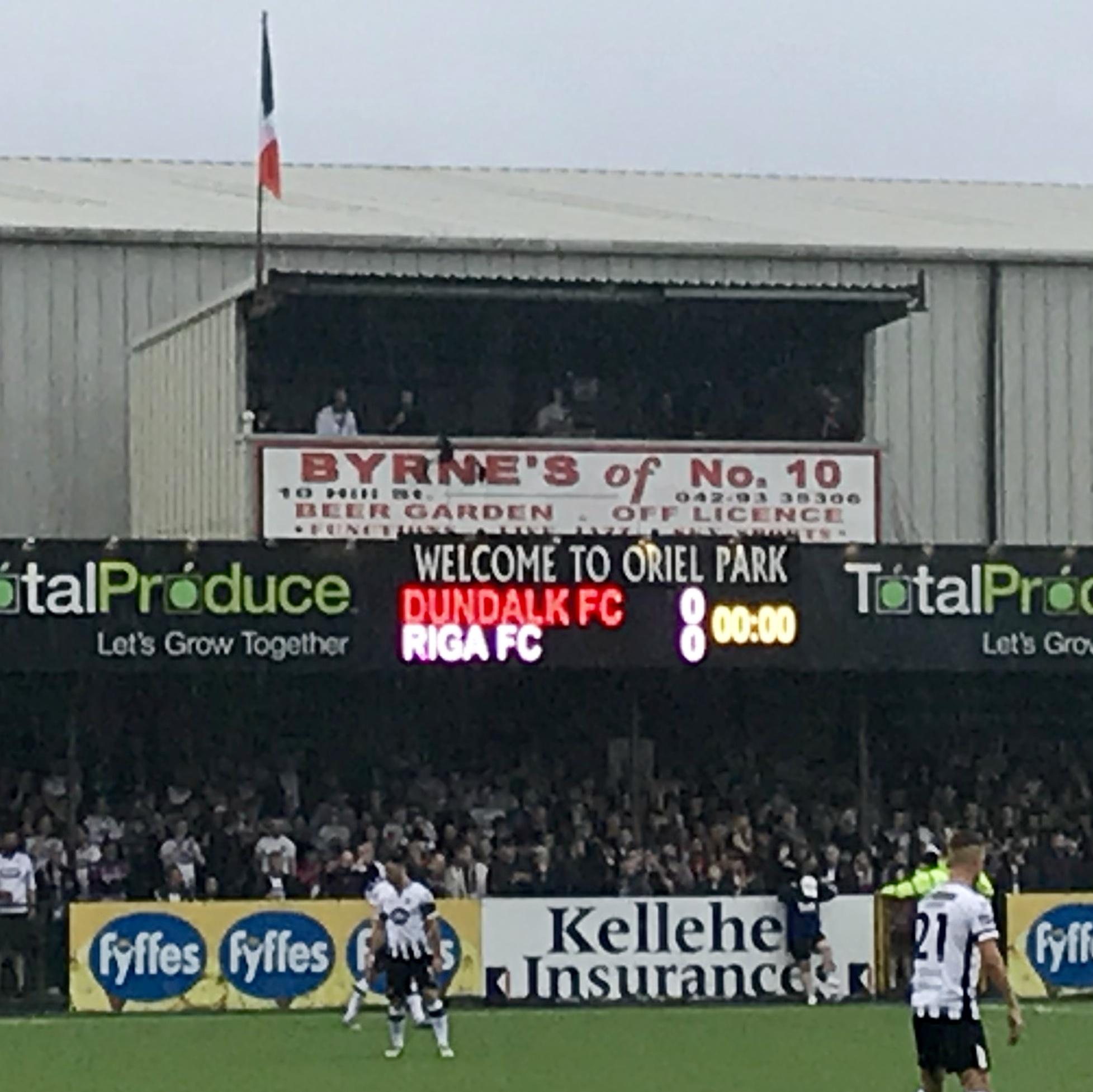
Commentary box

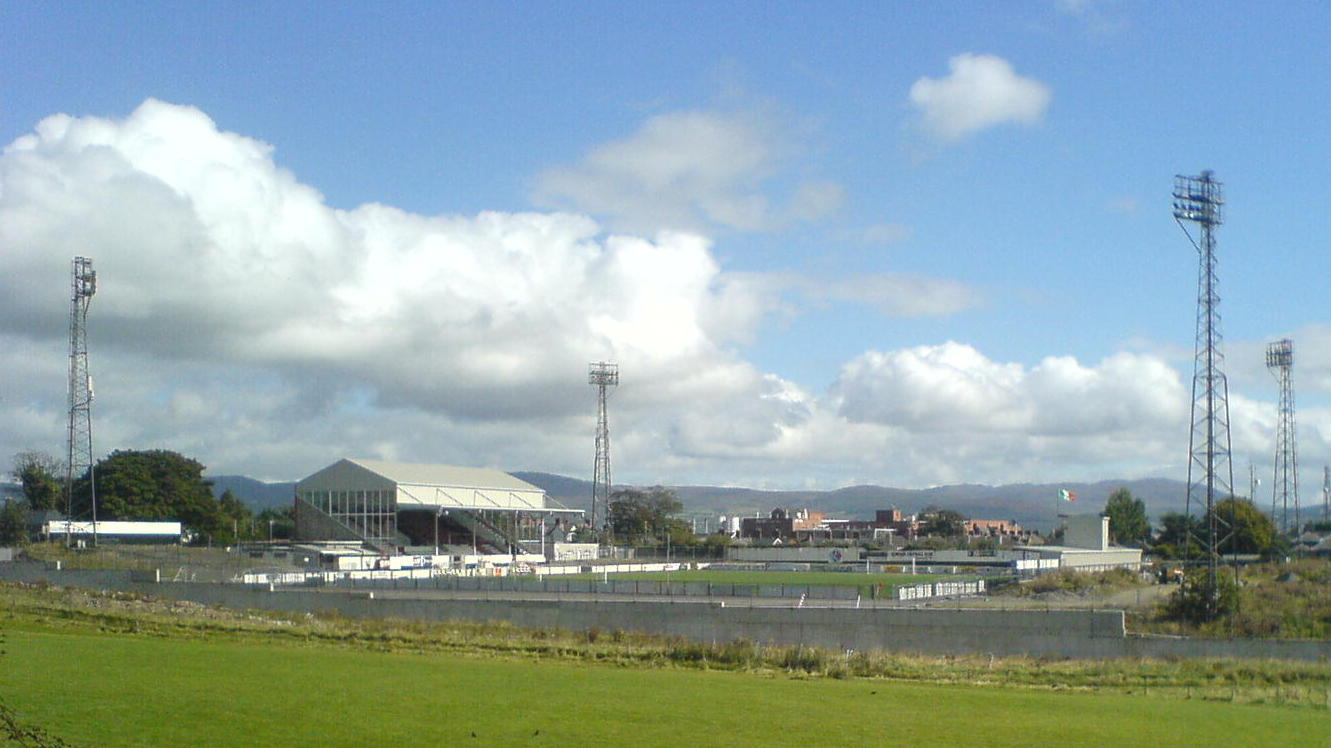
External view 2009, looking North-East

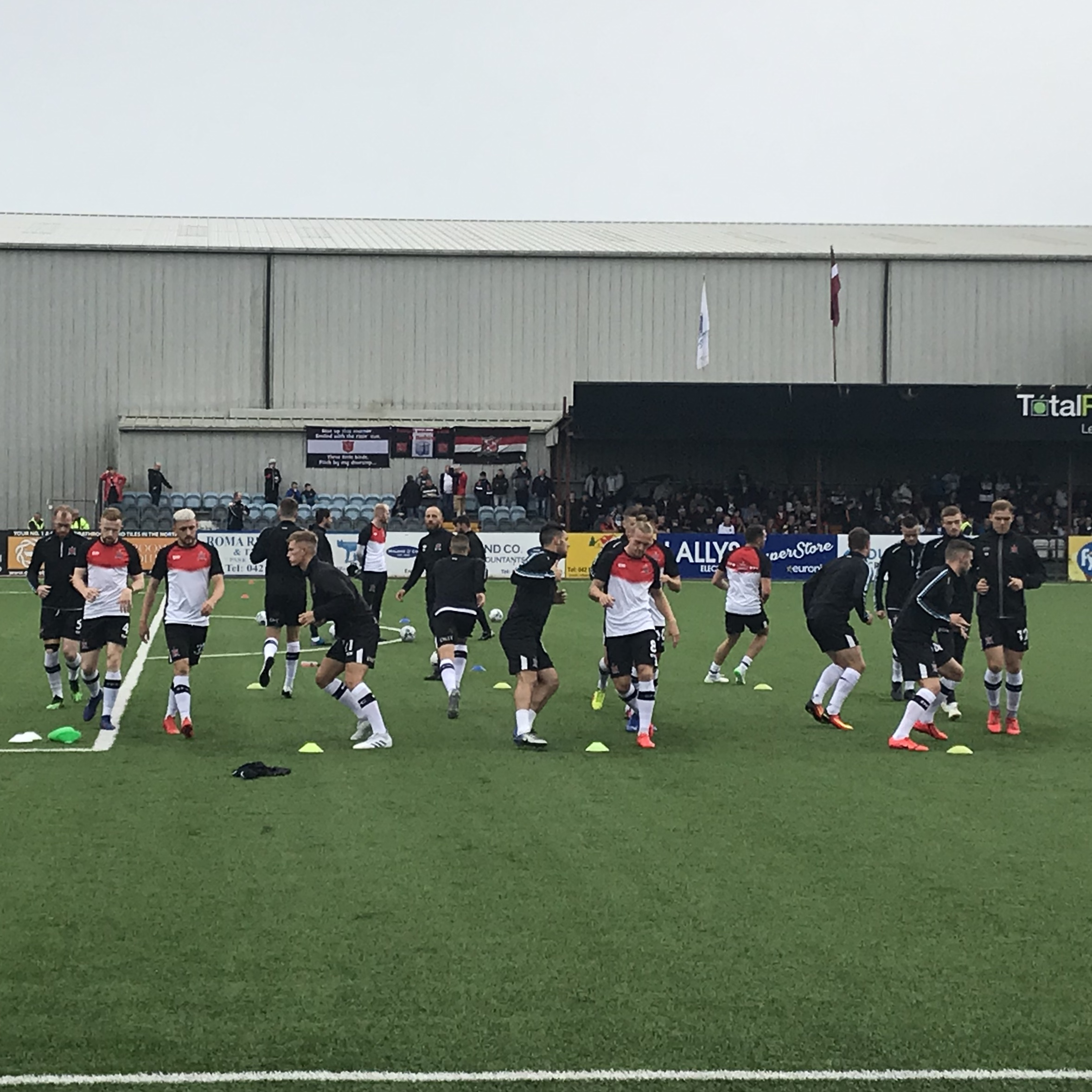
Dundalk F.C. squad warming up, 2019

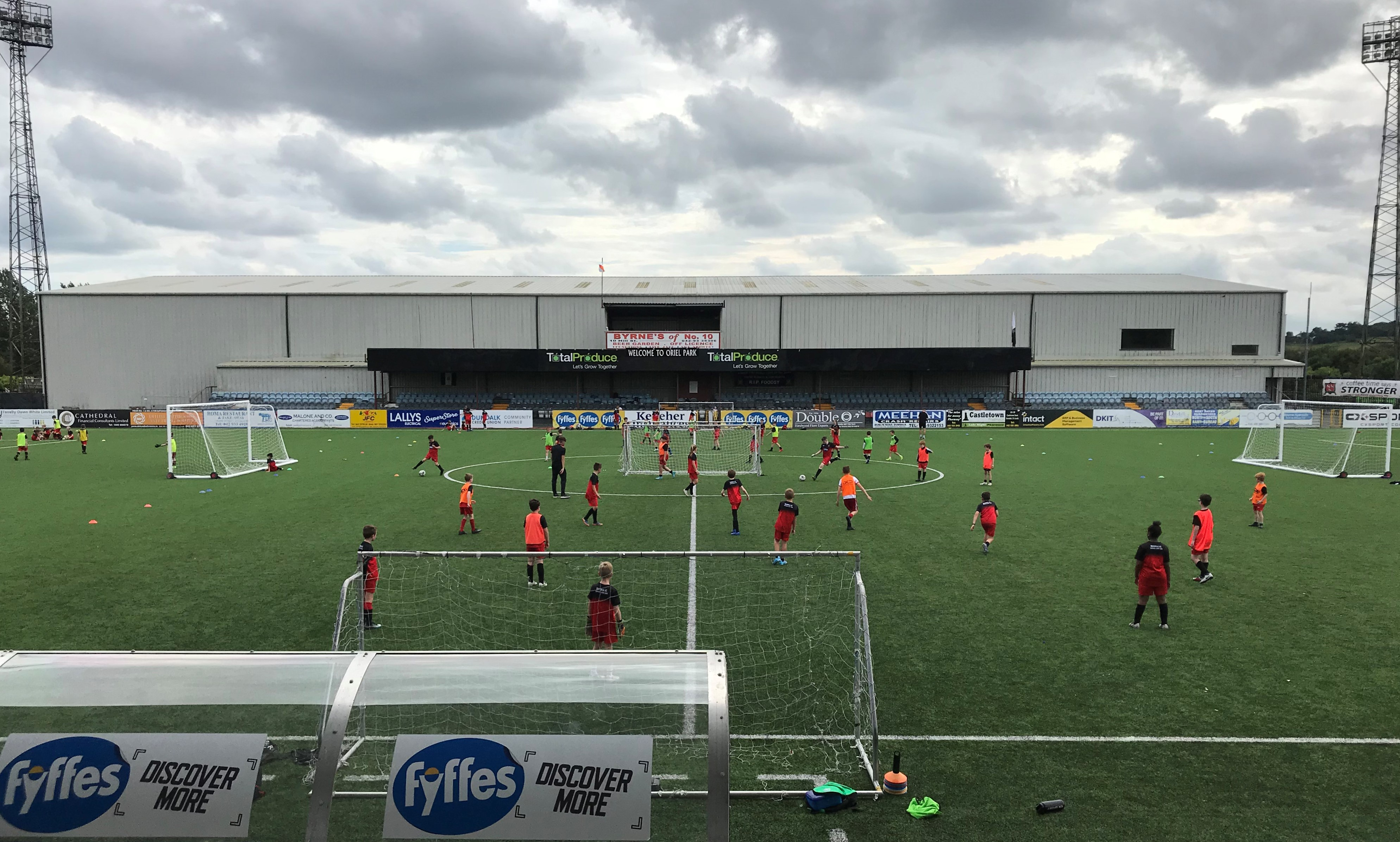
Barry Kehoe Kids Soccer Camp, 2019

== See also ==
- Stadiums of Ireland
- History of Dundalk F.C.
- Dundalk F.C. in European football
