= 1994–95 Dundalk F.C. season =

Dundalk
1994–95 season
- Manager: Dermot Keely
- Premier Division: 1st (champions)
- FAI Cup: Quarter-final
- League Cup: Runners-up
- Leinster Senior Cup: Runners-up
- Top goalscorer: League: Stephen Kelly (9); All: Stephen Kelly (11)
Home colours

Dundalk entered the 1994–95 season coming off a poor 1993–94, in which a general decline on and off the pitch reached a nadir – when they had missed out on the "Top Six" round-robin format that decided the title. They had also gone out early in both the FAI Cup and the League of Ireland Cup. Manager Dermot Keely was entering his first full season in charge, having replaced Turlough O'Connor early the previous season. It was Dundalk's 69th consecutive season in the top tier of Irish football.

== Season summary ==
In pre-season, veteran Gino Lawless was awarded a testimonial, and Manchester United were the visitors. In front of a packed Oriel Park, Dundalk took a 2–0 lead, and Eddie van Boxtel saved an Eric Cantona penalty, before United ran out 4–2 winners. Manager Dermot Keely, a Jim McLaughlin protege who had won the Double in 1978–79 as a player at Oriel, had to rebuild the squad due to its age profile, despite a worsening financial position. Early in the new season, however, the financial issues came to a head, and a number of local businessmen formed a new Interim Company to take the club over, saving it from bankruptcy.

Dundalk had started the season poorly, but a steady improvement in results saw them climb the league table. They reached finals in both the League Cup, (losing 2–1 on aggregate), and the Leinster Senior Cup (losing 2–1), and in the FAI Cup they were defeated in the quarter-final. With seven games to go in the League as many as eight clubs were in contention, but Dundalk were the most consistent, and Keely steered his team to a ninth league title on a final day of drama. They defeated Galway United at home, then, with players and supporters waiting on the pitch to hear the results of Shelbourne's and Derry City's matches, news filtered through that both had failed to win, confirming Dundalk as Champions - their third title in eight seasons. The trophy presented was that won in 1991, as the new trophy lay unopened in Athlone, where Derry City had been favourites to win out on the day. Notably, despite winning the title, nobody at Dundalk won a monthly or end of season award.

=== First-Team Squad (1994–95) ===
No.	Name	Years	League	FAI Cup	League Cup	Leinster Cup	Total	Goals
1	(Netherlands) Eddie van Boxtel	1991–1996	19	0	3	1	23	0
2	(Republic of Ireland) Martin Lawlor	1977–1995	10	2	4	4	20	0
3	(Scotland) James Coll	1989–1995	24	3	6	0	33	0
4	(Republic of Ireland) John Coady	1994–1996	29	2	4	0	35	2
5	(Republic of Ireland) Mick Doohan	1993–1999	33	3	6	1	43	8
6	(Republic of Ireland) Anthony Whelan	1994–1996	30	3	7	1	41	0
7	(Republic of Ireland) Brian Byrne	1994–1999	27	3	7	2	39	8
8	(Scotland) Tom McNulty	1984–2000	29	2	4	0	35	2
9	(Republic of Ireland) Joe Hanrahan	1992–1997	24	3	7	0	34	7
10	(Republic of Ireland) Stephen Kelly	1993–1996	32	3	7	1	43	11
11	(Republic of Ireland) Mick Byrne	1994–1996	8	3	0	1	11	7
12	(Republic of Ireland) Jody Byrne	1994–1995	15	3	4	3	25	0
13	(Republic of Ireland) Matt Britton	1992–1996	20	3	6	4	33	4
14	(Republic of Ireland) Ken DeMange	1994–1995	13	0	4	2	19	3
15	(Republic of Ireland) Brian Irwin	1991–1995	16	0	5	2	23	4
16	(Republic of Ireland) Keith Long	1993–1996	5	2	2	4	13	0
17	(England) Tony Loughlan	1994–1995	11	1	4	2	18	6
18	(England) Warren Patmore	1994–1995	10	0	3	1	14	9
19	(Northern Ireland) Peter Withnell	1994–1999	7	0	0	0	7	2

== Competitions ==
=== League Cup ===
Group

11 August 1994	Drogheda United	0–5	Dundalk	Drogheda
				Stadium: United Park

18 August 1994	Dundalk	1–1	Monaghan United	Dundalk
				Stadium: Oriel Park

21 August 1994	Longford Town	1–6	Dundalk	Longford
				Stadium: Strokestown Road

Quarter-final

31 October 1994	Dundalk	2–1	Shamrock Rovers	Dundalk
				Stadium: Oriel Park

Semi-final

1 December 1994	Dundalk	1–0	Derry City	Dundalk
				Stadium: Oriel Park

Final

15 January 1995	Cork City	1–0	Dundalk	Cork
				Stadium: Bishopstown Stadium

22 January 1995	Dundalk	1–1	Cork City	Dundalk
				Stadium: Oriel Park

Cork City won 2–1 on aggregate

=== Leinster Senior Cup ===
First round

18 October 1994	Dundalk	3–1	Whitehall Rangers	Dundalk
				Stadium: Oriel Park

Quarter-final

22 November 1994	St. Kevin's Boys	0–1	Dundalk	Dublin

Semi-final

6 December 1994	St James's Gate	0–8	Dundalk	Dublin

Final

7 February 1995	Dundalk	1–2 (a.e.t.)	UCD	Dublin

=== FAI Cup ===
First round

29 January 1995	Kilkenny City	0–5	Dundalk	Kilkenny
				Stadium: Buckley Park

Second round

26 February 1995	Dundalk	5–0	St James's Gate	Dundalk
				Stadium: Oriel Park

Quarter-final

9 March 1995	Dundalk	0–1	Derry City	Dundalk
				Stadium: Oriel Park

=== Premier Division ===
28 August 1994 Round 1	Bohemians	2–0	Dundalk

1 September 1994 Round 2	Dundalk	0–0	Monaghan United

4 September 1994 Round 3	St Patrick's Athletic	1–0	Dundalk

11 September 1994 Round 4	Dundalk	2–1	Cobh Ramblers

17 September 1994 Round 5	Sligo Rovers	0–1	Dundalk

24 September 1994 Round 6	Dundalk	1–1	Derry City

6 October 1994 Round 7	Dundalk	1–0	Shelbourne

9 October 1994 Round 8	Shamrock Rovers	3–0	Dundalk

16 October 1994 Round 9	Cork City	2–0	Dundalk

20 October 1994 Round 10	Dundalk	2–1	Athlone Town

27 October 1994 Round 11	Dundalk	1–0	Galway United

6 November 1994 Round 12	Galway United	0–0	Dundalk

10 November 1994 Round 13	Dundalk	2–0	Bohemians

20 November 1994 Round 14	Monaghan United	0–4	Dundalk

24 November 1994 Round 15	Dundalk	2–0	St Patrick's Athletic

3 December 1994 Round 16	Cobh Ramblers	2–2	Dundalk

8 December 1994 Round 17	Dundalk	1–1	Sligo Rovers

3 December 1994 Round 18	Derry City	2–0	Dundalk

27 December 1994 Round 19	Dundalk	2–1	Shamrock Rovers

30 December 1994 Round 20	Shelbourne	1–0	Dundalk

8 January 1995 Round 21	Dundalk	1–3	Cork City

13 January 1995 Round 22	Athlone Town	0–2	Dundalk

20 January 1995 Round 23	Bohemians	0–0	Dundalk

2 February 1995 Round 24	Dundalk	6–0	Monaghan United

11 February 1995 Round 25	St Patrick's Athletic	1–1	Dundalk

19 February 1995 Round 26	Dundalk	1–0	Cobh Ramblers

19 March 1995 Round 27	Shamrock Rovers	2–0	Dundalk

23 March 1995 Round 28	Dundalk	2–0	Derry City

26 March 1995 Round 29	Dundalk	1–1	Shelbourne

9 April 1995 Round 30	Cork City	0–1	Dundalk

16 April 1995 Round 31	Dundalk	1–0	Athlone Town

19 April 1995 Round 32	Sligo Rovers	0–1	Dundalk

23 April 1995 Round 33	Dundalk	2–0	Galway United

==== League table ====
Pos	Team	Pld	W	D	L	GF	GA	GD	Pts	Qualification or relegation
1	Dundalk (C)	33	17	8	8	41	25	+16	59	Qualification to UEFA Cup preliminary round
2	Derry City	33	16	10	7	45	30	+15	58	Qualification to Cup Winners' Cup qualifying round
3	Shelbourne	33	16	9	8	45	32	+13	57	Qualification to UEFA Cup preliminary round
4	Bohemians	33	14	11	8	48	30	+18	53	Qualification to Intertoto Cup group stage
5	St Patrick's Athletic	33	13	14	6	53	36	+17	53	
6	Shamrock Rovers	33	14	9	10	45	36	+9	51	
7	Cork City	33	15	4	14	55	42	+13	49	
8	Sligo Rovers	33	12	7	14	43	42	+1	43	
9	Galway United	33	10	9	14	39	53	−14	39	
10	Athlone Town (O)	33	6	14	13	31	44	−13	32	Qualification to Relegation play-off
11	Cobh Ramblers (R)	33	5	11	17	29	51	−22	26	Relegation to League of Ireland First Division
12	Monaghan United (R)	33	5	4	24	22	75	−53	19	Relegation to League of Ireland First Division

Source: www.rsssf.com
(C) Champions; (O) Play-off winners; (R) Relegated
