= 1932–33 Dundalk F.C. season =

Dundalk
1932–33 season
- Manager: Steve Wright
- League of Ireland: 1st (champions)
- FAI Cup: First round
- League of Ireland Shield: Runners-up
- Leinster Senior Cup: Second round
- Top goalscorer: League: John Smith (14); All: John Smith (29)
Home colours

Dundalk entered the 1932–33 season on the back of a fourth-place finish in the League and a fifth-place finish in the Shield the previous season. 1932–33 was manager Steve Wright's third season at the club, and was Dundalk's 7th consecutive season in the top tier of Irish football. Home matches were played at the Dundalk Athletic Grounds (a facility near the town centre shared by several sporting codes).

== Season summary ==
After Dundalk had finished as runners-up in both league and FAI Cup in 1930–31, the club's management committee had invested heavily in the side for the following season. The club had also been converted to a membership-based limited company – "Dundalk A.F.C. Limited" – on 25 January 1932. They won their first trophy as a senior club in 1931, the LFA President's Cup, and had looked like landing the league title, until an end of season slump saw them slip to fourth place. That, and a first round FAI Cup exit, had contributed to a poor financial position by the end of the 1931–32 season, and the team had been broken up. There was little expectation of success for 1932–33.

The 1932–33 season would be the last in which the league programme was played before the Shield. As the number of teams in the League had been reduced to ten, both league and Shield competitions were played on an 18-match, double round-robin basis. The league schedule got under way on 21 August 1932, and Dundalk were top after three matches. They opened up a three-point lead after the fifth match, in large part due to a solid defence that had conceded only two goals to that point. They continued to lead from the front and, despite dropping three points with the title in sight, they won it with a game to spare by defeating Bohemians in Dalymount Park. Their final match at home to St James's Gate the following week was delayed while the Gate players lined up to congratulate Dundalk captain, Gerry McCourt, in front of a cheering crowd. In becoming Champions, Dundalk were the first team from outside Dublin or Belfast to win a league title in Ireland since the inception of the Irish League in 1890. The season also saw their first league victories over Shelbourne and Bohemians – Dublin's two original Irish League clubs. Shelbourne got a measure of revenge, however, by defeating Dundalk in a second round replay in the Leinster Senior Cup.

Christmas and New Year saw a defeat in the opening Shield match and an exit in the first round of the FAI Cup to Dolphin after a replay. They got back in their stride, however, to reel off seven straight wins, and were still top of the Shield table after 12 matches. Their Shield challenge blew up subsequently, with three straight defeats. They won their final three matches, but it was not enough, and they finished two points behind Shamrock Rovers – points dropped to the bottom two sides (Bray Unknowns and Cork Bohemians) ultimately costing them. Having just missed out on a League and Shield Double, Dundalk would not win the league again until 1962–63, while they would not win the Shield until 1966–67.

=== First-Team Squad (1932–33) ===
No.	Name	Years	League	FAI Cup	League of Ireland Shield	Leinster Senior Cup	Total	Goals
1	(Wales) Ben Lewis	1931–1934	18	2	18	3	41	0
2	(Northern Ireland) Gordon McDiarmuid	1926–1933	18	2	17	3	40	3
3	(Scotland) Davy Nelson	1932–1933	12	0	3	3	18	0
4	(Northern Ireland) Sam Patton	1928–1934	17	2	17	3	39	13
5	(England) Henry Hurst	1930–1941	18	2	16	3	39	2
6	(Scotland) Barney Duffy	1932–1933	11	2	17	0	30	1
7	(Northern Ireland) Eddie Carroll	1927–1936	18	2	18	3	41	13
8	(Northern Ireland) James Mitchell	1932–1933	18	2	18	3	41	6
9	(Northern Ireland) Gerry McCourt	1930–1940	18	2	17	3	40	13
10	(Scotland) Michael Burke	1932–1934	12	1	16	0	29	15
11	(Republic of Ireland) John Smith	1931–1933	18	2	18	3	41	29
12	(Republic of Ireland) Paddy Clarke	1932–1934	6	2	15	0	23	0
13	(Northern Ireland) Richard Johnstone	1930–1933	5	1	6	3	15	1
14	(Republic of Ireland) Jack McMahon	1932–1933	6	0	0	3	9	3

== Competitions ==
=== Leinster Senior Cup ===
First round

7 September 1932	Dundalk	3–1	Distillery	Dublin
				Stadium: Tolka Park

Second round

19 September 1932	Dundalk	1–1	Shelbourne	Dundalk
				Stadium: Athletic Grounds

Second round replay

5 October 1932	Shelbourne	2–0	Dundalk	Dublin
				Stadium: Shelbourne Park

=== League ===
21 August 1932 Round 1	Bray Unknowns	1–1	Dundalk

28 August 1932 Round 2	Dolphin	0–2	Dundalk

4 September 1932 Round 3	Dundalk	3–0	Shelbourne

11 September 1932 Round 4	Drumcondra	1–3	Dundalk

17 September 1932 Round 5	Dundalk	1–0	Cork

25 September 1932 Round 6	Dundalk	0–2	Shamrock Rovers

2 October 1932 Round 7	Cork Bohemians	0–1	Dundalk

9 October 1932 Round 8	Dundalk	4–2	Bohemians

15 October 1932 Round 9	St James's Gate	2–3	Dundalk

22 October 1932 Round 10	Dundalk	2–1	Bray Unknowns

30 October 1932 Round 11	Dundalk	5–2	Dolphin

5 November 1932 Round 12	Shelbourne	2–2	Dundalk

13 November 1932 Round 13	Dundalk	2–1	Drumcondra

20 November 1932 Round 14	Cork	2–5	Dundalk

27 November 1932 Round 15	Shamrock Rovers	2–1	Dundalk

4 December 1932 Round 16	Dundalk	1–1	Cork Bohemians

10 December 1932 Round 17	Bohemians	0–4	Dundalk

18 December 1932 Round 18	Dundalk	4–2	St James's Gate

==== League table ====
Pos	Team	Pld	W	D	L	GF	GA	GD	Pts
1	Dundalk	18	13	3	2	44	21	+23	29
2	Shamrock Rovers	18	11	2	5	48	32	+16	24
3	Shelbourne	18	10	3	5	45	26	+19	23
4	Cork	18	10	1	7	35	35	0	21
5	Bray Unknowns	18	6	7	5	29	29	0	19
6	St James's Gate	18	8	1	9	39	41	−2	17
7	Cork Bohemians	18	4	6	8	30	38	−8	14
8	Dolphin	18	5	4	9	28	39	−11	14
9	Bohemians	18	4	5	9	24	40	−16	13
10	Drumcondra	18	1	4	13	22	43	−21	6

Source: www.rsssf.com

=== FAI Cup ===
First round

1 January 1933	Dundalk	1–1	Dolphin	Dundalk
				Stadium: Athletic Grounds

First round replay

4 January 1933	Dolphin	2–1	Dundalk	Dublin
				Stadium: Harold's Cross Stadium

=== Shield ===
27 December 1932 Round 1	Dundalk	2–4	Shelbourne

8 January 1933 Round 2	Cork	1–2	Dundalk

15 January 1933 Round 3	Dundalk	3–2	Cork Bohemians

22 January 1933 Round 4	Dundalk	6–0	St James's Gate

29 January 1933 Round 5	Dundalk	4–1	Bray Unknowns

5 February 1933 Round 6	St James's Gate	0–2	Dundalk

12 February 1933 Round 7	Dundalk	3–2	Dolphin

19 February 1933 Round 8	Drumcondra	1–4	Dundalk

19 February 1933 Round 9	Shelbourne	4–2	Dundalk

11 March 1933 Round 10	Dundalk	2–1	Cork

19 March 1933 Round 11	Cork Bohemians	1–1	Dundalk

2 April 1933 Round 12	Dundalk	1–0	Shamrock Rovers

5 April 1933 Round 13	Shamrock Rovers	5–3	Dundalk

9 April 1933 Round 14	Bray Unknowns	1–0	Dundalk

21 April 1933 Round 15	Bohemians	4–2	Dundalk

23 April 1933 Round 16	Dolphin	2–4	Dundalk

26 April 1933 Round 17	Dundalk	4–1	Bohemians

30 April 1933 Round 18	Dundalk	2–0	Drumcondra

==== Shield table ====
Pos	Team	Pld	W	D	L	GF	GA	GD	Pts
1	Shamrock Rovers	18	13	1	4	42	21	+21	27
2	Dundalk	18	12	1	5	47	30	+17	25
3	Shelbourne	17	10	1	6	39	21	+18	21
4	Drumcondra	17	10	1	6	40	29	+11	21
5	Cork	17	8	2	7	27	34	−7	18
6	Bohemians	17	6	3	8	41	40	+1	15
7	St James's Gate	16	6	2	8	19	25	−6	14
8	Dolphin	16	6	1	9	26	27	−1	13
9	Bray Unknowns	18	6	1	11	23	34	−11	13
10	Cork Bohemians	16	1	1	14	18	61	−43	3

Source: Irish Press
