= 1926–27 Dundalk F.C. season =

Dundalk G.N.R.
1926–27 season
- Manager: Joe McCleery
- League of Ireland: 8th
- FAI Cup: First round
- League of Ireland Shield: 7th
- Leinster Senior Cup: First round
- Top goalscorer: Matthew Armstrong, George Silcock (5)
Home colours

Dundalk G.N.R. made their debut in the Free State League, the top tier of Irish football, in 1926–27. They had played the previous four seasons in the Leinster Senior League. The team was managed by Joe McCleery, previously of Belfast Celtic F.C., who used his connections to Northern Irish football to ensure a supply of players for the season ahead. Home matches were played at the Dundalk Athletic Grounds (a facility near the town centre shared by several sporting codes), but on weekends when the Athletic Grounds were unavailable, matches would usually move to the Carroll's Recreation Ground.

== Season summary ==
On 15 June 1926 Dundalk G.N.R. were elected to the Free State League to replace Pioneers, as the nascent League looked to spread to the provinces. As it was entering its sixth season, nine clubs had already dropped out of the Free State League, so the challenge facing the new club was great. The cost of travel was one of the biggest issues facing provincial clubs in the League, and the club had sought support from its parent company, the Great Northern Railway (Ireland), with regard to travel expenses, but were refused. Three players were retained from the Leinster Senior League squad - Joey Quinn, Paddy McMahon and Hugh Craig.

The season opened with the 18-match League schedule, and on 21 August 1926 the team travelled to Cork to face fellow works-team Fordsons in the opening match of the season. The 30-strong group of players, officials and supporters who travelled were treated to a tour of the Ford factory before the game. The result was a 2–1 defeat for the new boys in a match the Cork Examiner described as being "one of the best ever seen in Ballinlough", Joey Quinn with Dundalk's first ever Free State League goal. Their first win would come at home to Jacobs on 19 September. They only managed two points away from home, including one in the first ever league match in Glenmalure Park, and finished their first league season in eighth position.

The nine-match League of Ireland Shield schedule commenced after Christmas, again with a visit to Cork to play Fordsons. The team managed two home wins and a draw, finishing seventh. Old Leinster Senior League rivals, Drumcondra, defeated them in a replay in the first round of the Leinster Senior Cup; while a heavy defeat to Bohemians saw them exit the FAI Cup in the first round, with the result that a number of players were released, including Quinn. A total of 47 players lined out for the team during the season, 11 of whom appeared only once, as manager McCleery tapped into his Northern Irish connections in his attempts to build a competitive side. Only two players would be retained for the following season - Gordon McDiarmuid (who had joined early in the Shield campaign) and Fred Norwood.

=== First-Team Squad (1926–27) ===
Note: Only players making a minimum of five appearances included

No.	Name	Years	League	FAI Cup	League of Ireland Shield	Leinster Senior Cup	Total	Goals
1	(Republic of Ireland) Con Drum	1926–1927	13	0	0	0	13	0
2	(Northern Ireland) Gordon McDiarmuid	1926–1933	0	0	6	1	7	0
3	(Scotland) Davy Nelson	1926–1927	4	1	5	2	12	0
4	(Northern Ireland) Fred Norwood	1926–1928	18	1	8	2	29	0
5	(Republic of Ireland) Billy Pollock	1926–1927	4	0	5	0	9	1
6	(Northern Ireland) Bob Thompson	1926–1927	12	1	8	2	23	5
7	(Northern Ireland) Edward Swindle	1926–1927	15	1	6	2	24	3
8	(Northern Ireland) George Silcock	1926–1927	9	1	1	0	11	5
9	(Northern Ireland) Matthew Armstrong	1926–1927	10	0	1	0	11	5
10	(Northern Ireland) Fred Bell	1926–1927	15	1	9	2	27	5
11	(Northern Ireland) Frank Rushe	1926–1927	15	1	4	1	21	4
12	(Republic of Ireland) Joey Quinn	1919–1927	10	1	0	0	11	3
13	(Republic of Ireland) Paddy McMahon	1920–1927	10	0	2	0	12	1
14	(Northern Ireland) Jimmy Wilson	1926–1927	5	1	6	1	13	0
15	(Northern Ireland) Arthur Farrelly	1926–1927	11	0	0	0	11	1
16	(Scotland) William Smith	1926–1927	0	0	8	2	10	0
17	(Northern Ireland) Hugh Reid	1926–1927	8	0	0	0	8	0
18	(Northern Ireland) Harry Bowden	1926–1927	5	1	2	0	8	0
19	(Northern Ireland) Jack McKinney	1926–1927	7	0	1	0	8	2
20	(Northern Ireland) Jimmy Carroll	1926–1927	0	0	4	2	6	4
21	(Republic of Ireland) Jimmy Doyle	1926–1927	0	0	5	0	5	3

== Competitions ==
=== League ===
21 August 1926 Round 1	Fordsons	2–1	Dundalk

28 August 1926 Round 2	Athlone Town	3–1	Dundalk

4 September 1926 Round 3	Dundalk	1–1	Bohemians

11 September 1926 Round 4	Shamrock Rovers	3–3	Dundalk

19 September 1926 Round 5	Dundalk	3–0	Jacobs

25 September 1926 Round 6	Bray Unknowns	2–1	Dundalk

2 October 1926 Round 7	Dundalk	1–1	Brideville

9 October 1926 Round 8	Shelbourne	3–0	Dundalk

16 October 1926 Round 9	Dundalk	1–1	St James's Gate

23 October 1926 Round 10	Dundalk	4–2	Fordsons

30 October 1926 Round 11	Dundalk	2–3	Athlone Town

6 November 1926 Round 12	Bohemians	4–2	Dundalk

13 November 1926 Round 13	Dundalk	0–5	Shamrock Rovers

27 November 1926 Round 14	Dundalk	4–1	Bray Unknowns

4 December 1926 Round 15	Brideville	4–3	Dundalk

12 December 1926 Round 16	Dundalk	0–2	Shelbourne

18 December 1926 Round 17	Dundalk	2–2	St James's Gate

1 January 1927 Round 18	Jacobs	1–1	Dundalk

==== League table ====
Pos	Team	Pld	W	D	L	GF	GA	GD	Pts
1	Shamrock Rovers	18	14	4	0	60	20	+40	32
2	Shelbourne	18	13	3	2	63	24	+39	29
3	Bohemians	18	10	5	3	36	24	+12	25
4	Fordsons	18	7	3	8	34	32	+2	17
5	Athlone Town	18	6	5	7	41	43	−2	17
6	Bray Unknowns	18	6	1	11	37	58	−21	13
7	Jacobs	18	5	3	10	23	47	−24	13
8	Dundalk GNR	18	3	6	9	30	40	−10	12
9	St. James's Gate	18	5	2	11	30	49	−19	12
10	Brideville	18	2	6	10	22	39	−17	10

Source: www.rsssf.com
Rules for classification: 1) points; 2) goal average

=== Shield ===
27 December 1926 Round 1	Fordsons	0–1	Dundalk

15 January 1927 Round 2	Dundalk	3–6	Shelbourne

29 January 1927 Round 3	Bohemians	2–1	Dundalk

6 February 1927 Round 4	Dundalk	3–2	Athlone Town

6 March 1927 Round 5	Dundalk	5–1	Jacobs

12 March 1927 Round 6	St James's Gate	0–0	Dundalk

19 March 1927 Round 7	Dundalk	3–4	Bray Unknowns

26 March 1927 Round 8	Brideville	4–0	Dundalk

10 April 1927 Round 9	Dundalk	1–3	Shamrock Rovers

==== Shield table ====
Pos	Team	Pld	W	D	L	GF	GA	GD	Pts
1	Shamrock Rovers	9	8	1	0	25	11	+14	17
2	Shelbourne	9	8	0	1	42	12	+30	16
3	Bohemians	9	6	2	1	24	16	+8	14
4	Fordsons	9	4	2	3	27	21	+6	10
5	St. James's Gate	9	4	2	3	21	27	−6	10
6	Brideville	9	2	2	5	13	16	−3	6
7	Dundalk GNR	9	2	1	6	16	23	−7	5
8	Bray Unknowns	9	2	1	6	21	35	−14	5
9	Athlone Town	9	2	0	7	20	30	−10	4
10	Jacobs	9	1	1	7	11	32	−21	3

Rules for classification: 1) points; 2) goal average

=== FAI Cup ===
First round

8 January 1927	Bohemians	6–1	Dundalk	Dublin
				Stadium: Dalymount Park

=== Leinster Senior Cup ===
First round

27 February 1927	Drumcondra	1–1	Dundalk	Dublin
				Stadium: Tolka Park

First round replay

3 March 1927	Dundalk	0–1	Drumcondra	Dundalk
				Stadium: Athletic Grounds
