= 1966–67 Dundalk F.C. season =

Dundalk
1966–67 season
- "The Greatest Year in the History of Dundalk Football Club"
- Manager: Alan Fox
- League of Ireland: 1st (champions)
- FAI Cup: Semi-final
- League of Ireland Shield: 1st (winners)
- Dublin City Cup: Runners-up
- Top Four Cup: Winners
- Leinster Senior Cup: Runners-up
- Top goalscorer: League: Danny Hale (15); All: Danny Hale (28)
- Highest home attendance: 14,000 (vs. Shamrock Rovers, Shield, 16 October 1966)
Home colours

Dundalk entered the 1966–67 season on the back of a disappointing eighth-place finish in the League and a sixth-place finish in the Shield the previous season. 1966–67 was Alan Fox's first season as player-coach, having been appointed by the club's new board of directors in August. It was Dundalk's 41st consecutive season in the top tier of Irish football.

== Season summary ==
The previous season had seen significant change at the club. By the end of 1965 it was clear that the debts, the condition of Oriel Park, and the need to rebuild the playing squad, were challenges beyond the membership-based ownership model. A new public limited company took the club over in January 1966, after the voluntary liquidation of the old company. The new board set about investing in Oriel Park, which consisted of turning the pitch 90 degrees, building a new stand, and adding player and spectator facilities. They also invested in a number of new players and a new player-coach, Alan Fox. Only five of the players who had finished the previous season were retained.

The new season started on 21 August 1966 with the Shield and the Dublin City Cup. Dundalk had never won the Shield in their 40 seasons of League of Ireland membership, being runners-up four times and going close in numerous seasons. At the 41st attempt, the new team made no mistake – with nine wins from the first 10 matches, effectively sealing the win with a 2–0 victory over Shamrock Rovers in front of a then record crowd of 14,000 for a domestic game in Oriel Park. 10 days later they met Shamrock Rovers again, this time in the City Cup final, but fell to a 2–1 defeat.

The League saw Fox's side continue their Shield form, with six consecutive wins (scoring 21 goals in the process) leaving them clear at the top of the table in the run up to Christmas. A three match losing streak through the new year, which included the Leinster Senior Cup Final, saw some doubts about the side creep in. But they only lost one more match in charging to the title ahead of Bohemians by seven points. The club's third League title brought the only League and Shield Double in its history. To cap a memorable season, they also won the Top Four Cup, their second and last win before the competition was discontinued in 1974. A semi-final defeat in the FAI Cup to Shamrock Rovers was the only slip-up that stopped the side winning medals in every competition. They called it "the greatest year in the history of Dundalk Football Club".

=== First-Team Squad (1966–67) ===
No.	Name	Years	League	FAI Cup	League of Ireland Shield	Other^{a}	Total	Goals
1	(Republic of Ireland) Kevin Blount	1966–1968	21	5	10	10	46	0
2	(Republic of Ireland) Fran Brennan	1966–1973	22	5	11	11	49	1
3	(Wales) Alan Fox	1966–1968	22	5	11	11	49	0
4	(Republic of Ireland) Patsy McKeown	1957–1968	18	5	11	10	44	0
5	(Republic of Ireland) Mick Millington	1965–1970	16	4	11	11	42	1
6	(Republic of Ireland) Kevin Murray	1966–1970	19	5	10	11	45	11
7	(Republic of Ireland) Paddy Turner	1966–1972	22	5	8	10	45	17
8	(Republic of Ireland) Ben Hannigan	1966–1969	20	5	11	7	43	26
9	(Northern Ireland) Danny Hale	1966–1968	20	3	10	9	42	28
10	(Republic of Ireland) Tony O'Connell	1966–1969	16	4	10	6	36	3
11	(England) Derek Stokes	1966–1970	16	4	0	5	25	17
12	(Northern Ireland) Jim Burke	1966–1968	12	0	6	8	26	0
13	(Republic of Ireland) Larry Gilmore	1966–1970	3	1	11	7	22	2
14	(Republic of Ireland) Francie Callan	1954–1967	13	4	0	3	20	4
15	(Republic of Ireland) Christy Barron	1959–1967	1	0	1	1	3	0

a. Includes the Leinster Senior Cup, Dublin City Cup, and Top Four Cup.

== Competitions ==
=== Shield ===
21 August 1966 Round 1	Cork Celtic	1–1	Dundalk

28 August 1966 Round 2	Dundalk	4–0	Shelbourne

4 September 1966 Round 3	Drogheda United	1–4	Dundalk

11 September 1966 Round 4	Dundalk	1–0	St Patrick's Athletic

18 September 1966 Round 5	Bohemians	0–1	Dundalk

25 September 1966 Round 6	Dundalk	1–0	Waterford

2 October 1966 Round 7	Cork Hibernians	1–5	Dundalk

9 October 1966 Round 8	Dundalk	6–2	Drumcondra

16 October 1966 Round 9	Dundalk	2–0	Shamrock Rovers

23 October 1966 Round 10	Sligo Rovers	1–0	Dundalk

30 October 1966 Round 11	Dundalk	2–0	Limerick

==== Shield table ====
Pos	Team	Pld	W	D	L	GF	GA	GD	Pts
1	Dundalk	11	9	1	1	27	7	+20	19
2	St Patrick's Athletic	11	7	2	2	20	8	+12	16
3	Shamrock Rovers	11	7	1	3	37	12	+25	15
4	Waterford	11	6	1	4	24	16	+8	13
5	Limerick	11	5	2	4	19	17	+2	12
6	Bohemians	11	5	2	4	17	15	+2	12
7	Drogheda United	11	5	1	5	14	18	−4	11
8	Drumcondra	11	5	1	5	17	24	−7	11
9	Cork Hibernians	11	4	0	7	18	31	−13	8
10	Shelbourne	11	3	0	8	14	31	−17	6
11	Cork Celtic	11	1	3	7	17	28	−11	5
12	Sligo Rovers	11	2	0	9	10	27	−17	4

Source: Irish Press

=== Dublin City Cup ===
First round

23 August 1966	Dundalk	2–0	Drogheda United	Dundalk
				Stadium: Oriel Park

Quarter-final

14 September 1966	Dundalk	2–1	Sligo Rovers	Dundalk
				Stadium: Oriel Park

Semi-final

5 October 1966	Dundalk	3–1	Waterford	Dublin
				Stadium: Dalymount Park

Final

26 October 1966	Dundalk	1–2	Shamrock Rovers	Dublin
				Stadium: Dalymount Park

=== Leinster Senior Cup ===
Fourth round

2 November 1966	Dundalk	3–1	Drogheda United	Dublin
				Stadium: Tolka Park

Semi-final

13 December 1966	Drumcondra	1–1	Dundalk	Dublin
				Stadium: Tolka Park

Semi-final Replay

15 December 1966	Drumcondra	2–5	Dundalk	Dublin
				Stadium: Tolka Park

Final

15 December 1966	Bohemians	1–0	Dundalk	Dublin
				Stadium: Dalymount Park

=== FAI Cup ===
First round

12 February 1967	Dundalk	6–1	Tramore Athletic	Dundalk
				Stadium: Oriel Park

Quarter-final

5 March 1967	Dundalk	1–1	Cork Hibernians	Dundalk
				Stadium: Oriel Park

Quarter-final Replay

8 March 1967	Cork Hibernians	0–1	Dundalk	Cork
				Stadium: Flower Lodge

Semi-final

1 April 1967	Dundalk	1–1	Shamrock Rovers	Dublin
				Stadium: Dalymount Park

Semi-final Replay

5 April 1967	Dundalk	0–3	Shamrock Rovers	Dublin
				Stadium: Tolka Park

=== Top Four Cup ===
Semi-final

30 April 1967	Dundalk	2–1	Sligo Rovers	Dundalk
				Stadium: Oriel Park

Final

7 May 1967	Bohemians	0–0	Dundalk	Dublin
				Stadium: Dalymount Park

Final Replay

12 May 1967	Dundalk	2–1	Bohemians	Dublin
				Stadium: Tolka Park

=== League ===
6 November 1966 Round 1	Dundalk	5–0	Cork Celtic

13 November 1966 Round 2	Shelbourne	1–3	Dundalk

20 November 1966 Round 3	Dundalk	3–0	Drogheda United

27 November 1966 Round 4	St Patrick's Athletic	1–3	Dundalk

4 December 1966 Round 5	Dundalk	3–0	Bohemians

11 December 1966 Round 6	Waterford	2–4	Dundalk

18 December 1966 Round 7	Dundalk	0–0	Cork Hibernians

26 December 1966 Round 8	Drumcondra	1–2	Dundalk

1 January 1967 Round 9	Shamrock Rovers	2–1	Dundalk

8 January 1967 Round 10	Dundalk	1–2	Sligo Rovers

15 January 1967 Round 11	Limerick	2–3	Dundalk

22 January 1967 Round 12	Cork Celtic	1–4	Dundalk

29 January 1967 Round 13	Dundalk	6–0	Shelbourne

5 February 1967 Round 14	Drogheda United	1–3	Dundalk

19 February 1967 Round 15	Dundalk	2–2	St Patrick's Athletic

26 February 1967 Round 16	Bohemians	3–0	Dundalk

12 March 1967 Round 17	Dundalk	3–0	Waterford

19 March 1967 Round 18	Cork Hibernians	0–0	Dundalk

26 March 1967 Round 19	Dundalk	2–0	Drumcondra

9 April 1967 Round 20	Sligo Rovers	1–1	Dundalk

14 April 1967 Round 21	Dundalk	2–0	Shamrock Rovers

16 April 1967 Round 22	Dundalk	3–0	Limerick

==== League table ====
Pos	Team	Pld	W	D	L	GF	GA	GD	Pts
1	Dundalk	22	15	4	3	54	19	+35	34
2	Bohemians	22	12	3	7	45	27	+18	27
3	Sligo Rovers	22	11	5	6	37	29	+8	27
4	Limerick	22	9	6	7	31	29	+2	24
5	Waterford	22	11	1	10	53	48	+5	23
6	St Patrick's Athletic	22	8	5	9	49	51	−2	21
7	Shamrock Rovers	22	8	4	10	31	31	0	20
8	Drumcondra	22	6	8	8	35	38	−3	20
9	Cork Hibernians	22	7	5	10	31	39	−8	19
10	Drogheda United	22	7	5	10	31	42	−11	19
11	Cork Celtic	22	8	3	11	30	52	−22	19
12	Shelbourne	22	4	3	15	32	54	−22	11

Source: www.rsssf.com
