= Tommy Connolly (footballer) =

Irish footballer (1946–2021)

Personal information
- Full name: Thomas Connolly
- Date of birth: 1946
- Place of birth: Dundalk, County Louth, Leinster, Ireland
- Date of death: 27 July 2021 (aged 74)
- Place of death: Drogheda, County Louth, Leinster, Ireland
- Position: Inside forward

Youth career
- Rangers; Dundalk

Senior career*
Years	Team	Apps	(Gls)
1969–1973	Dundalk	29	(1)

Managerial career
- 1975–1983: Dundalk (youth team)
- 1984–1985: Dundalk
- 1984–1990: Leinster (youth team)
- 1985–1997: Dundalk (assistant manager)
- 1997–1999: Dundalk (joint manager)
- * Club domestic league appearances and goals

Thomas O. Connolly (1946 – 27 July 2021) was an Irish footballer and manager who enjoyed a 40-year association as player, youth team coach, assistant manager and first-team manager with Dundalk.

== Career ==
After starting out with Rangers in the Dundalk Minor League, Connolly joined the Dundalk youth team in the early 1960s. He made his first-team debut under Liam Tuohy in April 1970 against St Patrick's Athletic and went on to make a total of 29 appearances between 1970 and 1973. In 1975, under Jim McLaughlin, he became manager of the club's youth squad before taking charge of the Leinster youth team between 1984 and 1990. Connolly undertook his first stint as Dundalk's first-team manager in 1984. He had a further four more periods in that role, either as caretaker or joint manager, right up to 2005. Connolly's managerial services were also in demand at national level and he held the position of manager with the Irish Technical Colleges (1991), FAI U15 and U16 (1993–1995), National League U23 (1996) and the National League U20 squad (1997).

== Honours ==
=== Player ===
Dundalk

- League of Ireland Shield: 1971–72

=== Manager ===
Dundalk

- League of Ireland Premier Division: 1987–88, 1990–91, 1994–95
- FAI Cup: 1987–88
- League of Ireland Cup: 1986–87, 1989–90
