= Peter Withnell =

Northern Irish sportsperson (born 1968)

Personal information
- Date of birth: 5 January 1968 (age 58)
- Position: Forward

Senior career*
Years	Team	Apps	(Gls)
1995–1999	Dundalk		
1999–?	Cliftonville		
- * Club domestic league appearances and goals

Peter Withnell (born 5 January 1968) is a Northern Irish former association footballer and Gaelic footballer.

== Early life ==
Withnell played football at age eleven before taking a break and playing it again at age fifteen.

== Sporting career ==
In Gaelic football, Withnell was part of the Down senior team that won the 1991 All-Ireland Senior Football Championship. In Gaelic football, he played as a defender, midfielder and forward.

In association football, Withnell won the League of Ireland Premier Division with Dundalk in the 1994–95 season. He had previously played for Northern Irish lower league side Kilmore Rec. Withnell moved to Cliftonville in January 1999. At the end of the 1998–99 season he scored once in the first match and a hat-trick in the second match of the relegation playoff against Ards, ensuring his club avoided relegation.
