= Ned Weir =

Irish footballer (1910–1988)

Personal information
- Full name: Edward Weir
- Date of birth: c. 1910
- Place of birth: Naas, Ireland
- Height: 5 ft 9 in (1.75 m)
- Position: Left half

Youth career
- Bonnybridge St. Josephs

Senior career*
Years	Team	Apps	(Gls)
- Camelon Juniors
1929–1932	Falkirk	7	(0)
1931	→ St Bernard's (loan)	13	(1)
1932–1938	St Bernard's	182	(10)
1938–1939	Clyde	44	(0)
1946–1947	Raith Rovers	20	(1)
1947–1948	Dunfermline Athletic	3	(0)
1948	Dundalk	0	(0)

International career
1939	Ireland (IFA)	1	(0)
1939	Ireland (FAI)	3	(0)
1940	Scotland (wartime)	1	(0)

Managerial career
- 1948–1950: Dundalk
- * Club domestic league appearances and goals

Edward Weir (c. 1910 – 1988) was an Irish footballer who played for several clubs in the Scottish Football League. He was also a dual Irish international and played for both Ireland teams – the IFA XI and the FAI XI. After retiring as a player, he managed Dundalk FC.

== Playing career ==
=== Club ===
Weir was raised in Scotland and began playing football with his local church side, St Joseph's in Bonnybridge, before joining Camelon Juniors where he developed his skills as a left half. He spent three seasons with Falkirk but was largely a bit-part player. He then joined St Bernard's of Scottish Division Two, initially on loan.

During the 1937–38 season, he was spotted by a Dublin football fan, Matt Murtagh, who subsequently recommended him to both the IFA and the FAI. Before the following season Weir was transferred to Clyde and helped them win the Scottish Cup in 1939: he put in a man of the match performance as Clyde beat Rangers 4–1 in the third round, and they went on to defeat Motherwell 4–0 in the final.

=== International ===
When Weir played international football during 1939 there were, in effect, two Ireland teams, chosen by two rival associations. Both associations, the Northern Ireland – based IFA and the Irish Free State – based FAI claimed jurisdiction over the whole of Ireland and selected players from the whole island. As a result, several notable Irish players from this era, including Weir, played for both teams.

Weir made his international debut with the IFA XI on 15 March 1939 in a 3–1 away defeat against Wales. This was his one and only appearance for the IFA XI.

Weir also made three appearances for the FAI XI, all in 1939. Four days after playing for the IFA XI, he made his debut for the FAI XI on 19 March in a 2–2 draw with Hungary at the Mardyke. He then went on a European tour with the FAI XI and played in the team's last two internationals before the Second World War. The first of these was a return game against Hungary on 18 May which again finished as a 2–2 draw. He made his last appearance for the FAI XI on 23 May in a 1–1 draw with Germany.

While at Clyde, Weir also played for a Scotland XI in a 3–2 win against an Eire XI at Dalymount Park in an unofficial international match in April 1940. He had earlier been selected for an Edinburgh select team which played against Glasgow as part of the George VI coronation celebrations in 1937 as a St Bernard's player.

== Coaching career ==
In 1948 Weir joined Dundalk as a player-coach but only played a few pre-season friendlies. He later went on to manage Dundalk for two seasons, guiding them victory in both the FAI Cup and the Dublin City Cup in 1949. He is largely credited with bringing a new level of professionalism to Dundalk, employing Scottish backroom staff and recruiting four Scottish players.

== Honours ==
=== Player ===
Clyde

- Scottish Cup: 1938–39
- Glasgow Cup:
  - Runner-up: 1938–39

St Bernard's

- Rosebery Charity Cup: 1930–31
  - Runner-up: 1935–36

=== Manager ===
Dundalk

- FAI Cup: 1948–49
- Dublin City Cup: 1948–49
- Dublin and Belfast Cup:
  - Runner-up: 1948–49
