= Kevin Murray (Irish footballer) =

Irish footballer

Kevin Murray was an Irish soccer player during the 1960s.

== Career ==
Murray was an inside-right player who played for Bohemians and Dundalk amongst others during his career in the League of Ireland. He played for Bohs for two seasons (42 league appearances with 15 goals) before joining Dundalk in 1966 where he won a league winners medal.
