= 1949 FAI Cup final =

- Event: 1948–49 FAI Cup
Dundalk	Shelbourne
3	0
- Date: 10 April 1949
- Venue: Dalymount Park, Dublin
- Referee: E. Roland
- Attendance: 28,539

The 1949 FAI Cup final was the final match of the 1948–49 FAI Cup, a knock-out association football competition contested annually by clubs affiliated with the Football Association of Ireland. It took place on Sunday 10 April 1949 at Dalymount Park in Dublin, and was contested by Dundalk and Shelbourne. Dundalk won 3–0 to win their second FAI Cup.

== Background ==
Both sides had finished level on 23 points in the League – six points behind champions Drumcondra. Dundalk had won the season opening Dublin City Cup the previous September, topping its league format unbeaten, which was their first trophy since 1942–43. To reach the final they had defeated Cork Athletic (4–1), had a bye in the next round, then defeated Drumcondra in the semi-final (2–1 in a replay following a 2–2 draw). The two sides went into the match with identical records in previous FAI Cup finals - one win and three defeats apiece.

Shelbourne had defeated Dundalk to win the League of Ireland Shield earlier in the season, and defeated non-League Freebooters, St Patrick's Athletic and Waterford to make the final.

== Match ==
=== Summary ===
A close match between "two of the most consistent sides of the season", was expected to "rise above the average" in previews. It lived up to the billing, being described afterwards as "the best final at Dalymount Park for many years". The match was evenly contested throughout, with both sides creating chances. But Dundalk were defensively sound, and took their chances against a more nervous Shelbourne defence. They took the lead through Jackie Walsh in the 20th minute, after Shelbourne had made most of the early play. Shelbourne then had a shot deflected onto the post by Mike Skivington, before Dundalk scored a second through Ronnie Henderson in the 41st minute. In the second half Arthur Fitzsimmons hit the crossbar, before Jackie Walsh headed home his second, and Dundalk's third, to seal their second FAI Cup win.

=== Details ===
10 April 1949
15:30

Dundalk	3–0	Shelbourne
Jackie Walsh 20'; Ronnie Henderson 41'; Jackie Walsh 68'	Report

Dalymount Park, Dublin
Attendance: 28,539
Referee: E. Roland

Dundalk	Shelbourne

GK	(Scotland) Alex Anderson
RFB	(Northern Ireland) Johnny Fearon
LFB	(Republic of Ireland) John Maguire
RHB	(Republic of Ireland) Philip Murphy
CHB	(Scotland) Mike Skivington
LHB	(Republic of Ireland) Johnny Matthews (c)
OR	(Republic of Ireland) Peadar Walsh
IR	(Scotland) Danny McElhinney
CF	(Scotland) Ronnie Henderson
IL	(Scotland) Edward Hamilton
OL	(Republic of Ireland) Jackie Walsh

GK	(England) Norman Tapken
RFB	(Republic of Ireland) John Murphy
LFB	(Republic of Ireland) Sean Haughey
RHB	(Republic of Ireland) Richard Rooney
CHB	(Republic of Ireland) Shay Nolan
LHB	(Republic of Ireland) Peter Keely
OR	(Republic of Ireland) Martin Colfer
IR	(Republic of Ireland) Arthur Fitzsimons
CF	(Republic of Ireland) Brendan Carroll
IL	(Republic of Ireland) Peter Desmond
OL	(Republic of Ireland) Gerry Malone
