= Norman Tapken =

English footballer

Personal information
- Date of birth: 21 February 1913
- Place of birth: Wallsend, Northumberland, England
- Date of death: 16 June 1996 (aged 83)
- Height: 5 ft 10 in (1.78 m)
- Position: Goalkeeper

Senior career*
Years	Team	Apps	(Gls)
?–1933	Wallsend Thermal Welfare		
1933–1938	Newcastle United	106	(0)
1938–1947	Manchester United	14	(0)
1942–1943	→ Newcastle United (guest)	9	(0)
1942–1943	→ Sunderland (guest)	2	(0)
1943–1946	→ Darlington (guest)	44	(0)
1944–1945	→ Aldershot (guest)	3	(0)
1944–1945	→ Brighton & Hove Albion (guest)	2	(0)
1944–1945	→ Chester (guest)	1	(0)
1947–1948	Darlington	31	(0)
1948–1949	Shelbourne		

International career
1948–1949	League of Ireland XI	2	(0)
- * Club domestic league appearances and goals

Norman H. Tapken (21 February 1913 – 16 June 1996) was an English footballer whose regular position was as a goalkeeper. Born in Wallsend, Northumberland, he began his career with local club Wallsend Thermal Welfare, before joining Newcastle United in May 1933. After taking over from Mick Burns as Newcastle's first-choice goalkeeper during the 1934–35 season, he went on to make a total of 106 Football League appearances for Newcastle before joining Manchester United in December 1938 for a fee of £850.

Taking over from regular goalkeeper Jack Breedon, Tapken made his debut for the club at home to Leicester City on Boxing Day 1938; he kept a clean sheet as Manchester United won 3–0. He retained the number one jersey for the next two months, but a run of four games at the end of February 1939 in which he conceded 16 goals saw Tommy Breen take over. Tapken returned to duty for three games at the start of April, but a 3–1 defeat to Leeds United resulted in Breedon step in again for the final four games of the season.

During the Second World War, Tapken played in the Wartime League for his old club, Newcastle United (nine appearances), and Sunderland (two appearances) in 1942–43, before finding more regular action with Darlington (32 appearances) in 1943–44. In 1944–45, as well as playing for Darlington (six appearances), he turned out for Aldershot (three appearances), Brighton & Hove Albion (two appearances) and Chester (one appearance). He played one more season in the Wartime League with Darlington (six appearances), before returning to play 12 matches for Manchester United.

However, with the resumption of The Football League in August 1946, Tapken – now 34 years old – was unable to regain his place in the Manchester United first team, and in April 1947, he moved to Darlington on a permanent basis. He missed just 11 games in the 1947–48 season, but his performances could not help Darlington to any higher than 16th place in the Third Division North. At the end of the season, he joined Irish club Shelbourne, where he spent one season before retiring from the game; it turned out to be his most successful season as a professional, as the team won the League of Ireland Shield, the Leinster Cup and finished as runners-up in the League of Ireland and the FAI Cup, while Tapken himself was selected for two League of Ireland XI matches against the Irish Football League (Northern Ireland).

In July 1952, Tapken took up an assistant trainer role with Stoke City.
