= Joe McCleery =

Irish football manager

Joe McCleery was an Irish football manager.

== Biography ==
McCleery was born in Lurgan around 1884. He was the first manager of Derry City F.C. upon their entry into the Irish League in 1929. Prior to this he had been manager of Dundalk.

McCleery died in Lurgan in October 1957 at age 73.
