= Alan Fox (footballer) =

Welsh footballer (1936–2021)

Personal information
- Date of birth: 10 July 1936
- Place of birth: Holywell, Wales
- Date of death: September 2021 (aged 85)
- Position: Centre half

Youth career
- Carmel United
- Wrexham

Senior career*
Years	Team	Apps	(Gls)
1954–1964	Wrexham	350	(3)
1964–1965	Hartlepools United	58	(0)
1965–1966	Bradford City	33	(0)
- Dundalk
Total		441	(3)

International career
- Wales U23
- * Club domestic league appearances and goals

Alan Fox (10 July 1936 – 16 September 2021) was a Welsh professional footballer who played as a centre half.

== Career ==
Born in Holywell, Fox played for Carmel United, Wrexham, Hartlepools United, Bradford City and Dundalk. He also played for Wales at under-23 level.

He died on 16 September 2021.
