= 1994–95 League of Ireland Premier Division =

League of Ireland Premier Division
- Season: 1994–95
- Champions: Dundalk F.C. (9th title)
- Relegated: Cobh Ramblers; Monaghan United
- UEFA Cup: Dundalk F.C. Shelbourne
- UEFA Cup Winners' Cup: Derry City
- UEFA Intertoto Cup: Bohemians
- Top goalscorer: John Caulfield: 16 (Cork City)

The 1994–95 League of Ireland Premier Division was the 10th season of the League of Ireland Premier Division. The division was made up of 12 teams. Dundalk F.C. won the title.

== Regular season ==
This season saw the league revert to the format of each team playing three rounds of games, playing every other team three times.

=== Final table ===
Pos	Team	Pld	W	D	L	GF	GA	GD	Pts	Qualification or relegation
1	Dundalk (C)	33	17	8	8	41	25	+16	59	Qualification to UEFA Cup preliminary round
2	Derry City	33	16	10	7	45	30	+15	58	Qualification to Cup Winners' Cup qualifying round
3	Shelbourne	33	16	9	8	45	32	+13	57	Qualification to UEFA Cup preliminary round
4	Bohemians	33	14	11	8	48	30	+18	53	Qualification to Intertoto Cup group stage
5	St Patrick's Athletic	33	13	14	6	53	36	+17	53	
6	Shamrock Rovers	33	14	9	10	45	36	+9	51	
7	Cork City	33	15	4	14	55	42	+13	49	
8	Sligo Rovers	33	12	7	14	43	42	+1	43	
9	Galway United	33	10	9	14	39	53	−14	39	
10	Athlone Town (O)	33	6	14	13	31	44	−13	32	Qualification to Relegation play-off
11	Cobh Ramblers (R)	33	5	11	17	29	51	−22	26	Relegation to League of Ireland First Division
12	Monaghan United (R)	33	5	4	24	22	75	−53	19	Relegation to League of Ireland First Division

Source: www.rsssf.com
(C) Champions; (O) Play-off winners; (R) Relegated

=== Results ===
==== Matches 1–22 ====
Home \ Away	ATH	BOH	COB	COR	DER	DUN	GAL	MON	SHM	SHE	SLI	StP
Athlone Town	—	0–0	0–2	2–3	0–1	0–2	1–1	1–1	4–2	0–0	0–0	2–2
Bohemians	3–1	—	4–1	1–2	0–0	2–0	3–0	3–0	2–4	3–3	0–1	1–1
Cobh Ramblers	0–0	0–1	—	0–0	0–0	2–2	1–2	0–2	0–3	0–0	1–1	1–0
Cork City	4–2	2–1	3–0	—	2–4	2–0	0–0	4–0	1–1	0–1	3–2	3–1
Derry City	2–1	1–0	3–1	0–0	—	2–0	1–1	2–0	0–1	1–2	4–3	0–3
Dundalk	2–1	2–0	2–1	1–3	1–1	—	1–0	0–0	2–1	1–0	1–1	2–0
Galway United	1–2	2–2	0–5	2–1	1–4	0–0	—	5–2	1–1	0–1	2–1	0–0
Monaghan United	1–0	0–1	3–1	0–5	0–1	0–4	2–3	—	0–1	1–1	0–6	0–0
Shamrock Rovers	1–0	1–1	1–1	2–1	4–0	3–0	1–2	3–0	—	0–0	1–0	1–1
Shelbourne	2–2	0–2	1–1	2–0	3–0	1–0	2–3	0–2	3–1	—	1–3	0–2
Sligo Rovers	0–0	1–0	3–1	3–2	0–0	0–1	0–0	2–1	1–0	1–2	—	4–1
St Patrick's Athletic	1–1	0–0	5–0	3–4	1–1	1–0	4–2	2–0	3–3	1–0	5–0	—

Legend: Blue = home team win; Yellow = draw; Red = away team win.

==== Matches 23–33 ====
Home \ Away	ATH	BOH	COB	COR	DER	DUN	GAL	MON	SHM	SHE	SLI	StP
Athlone Town	—	—	1–0	1–4	1–1	—	—	1–0	1–0	—	1–0	—
Bohemians	2–2	—	3–0	—	—	0–0	2–0	—	—	1–2	—	—
Cobh Ramblers	—	—	—	1–0	1–1	—	—	5–0	0–2	—	—	0–1
Cork City	—	1–2	—	—	0–2	0–1	—	1–3	0–1	—	2–0	—
Derry City	—	1–1	—	—	—	—	2–0	—	1–0	2–0	—	2–0
Dundalk	1–0	—	1–0	—	2–0	—	2–0	6–0	—	1–1	—	—
Galway United	0–1	—	1–0	0–1	—	—	—	—	—	—	4–2	2–4
Monaghan United	—	1–2	—	—	0–5	—	1–2	—	1–2	—	—	0–1
Shamrock Rovers	—	0–2	—	—	—	2–1	1–1	—	—	0–3	0–2	1–1
Shelbourne	3–1	—	3–0	1–0	—	—	2–1	3–1	—	—	—	1–1
Sligo Rovers	—	0–2	2–2	—	1–0	0–1	—	2–0	—	0–1	—	—
St Patrick's Athletic	1–1	1–1	—	2–1	—	1–1	—	—	—	—	3–1	—

Legend: Blue = home team win; Yellow = draw; Red = away team win.

== Promotion/relegation play-off ==
Athlone Town who finished in tenth place played off against Finn Harps F.C., the third placed team from the 1994–95 League of Ireland First Division.

=== 1st leg ===
Finn Harps F.C.	0–0	Athlone Town

=== 2nd leg ===
Athlone Town	0–0	Finn Harps F.C.

Athlone Town won 5–3 on penalties and retain their place in the Premier Division

== See also ==
- 1994–95 League of Ireland First Division
