= Dundalk F.C. =

Association football club in Ireland

Dundalk
- Full name: Dundalk Football Club
- Nicknames: The Lilywhites; The Railwaymen (original)
- Short name: DFC
- Founded: September 1903; 123 years ago as Dundalk G.N.R. Association Football Club
- Ground: Oriel Park
- Capacity: 4,500 (3,100 seated)
- Coordinates: 54°00′00″N 06°25′00″W
- Owner: Dundalk Town FC Ltd (consortium)
- Chairperson: Chris Clinton
- Manager: Ciarán Kilduff
- League: League of Ireland Premier Division
- 2026: 6th of 10
- Website: dundalkfc.com
Home colours	Away colours

Dundalk Football Club (/dʌnˈdɔː(l)k/ dun-DAW(L)K) is a professional football club that competes in the League of Ireland Premier Division, the top tier of football in the Republic of Ireland. It was founded in 1903 as Dundalk G.N.R., the works-team of the Great Northern Railway. It is based in Dundalk, County Louth and its home ground is Oriel Park. The club crest is three martlets on a shield, which was adopted from the town's coat of arms. The team's traditional kit colours are white shirts (giving the team their nickname 'the Lilywhites') with black shorts and white or black socks. The Dundalk women's team competes in the Women's Development League (WDL), the second tier of women's football in Ireland.

Dundalk were a junior club until they were invited to join the Leinster Senior League in 1922–23. After four seasons at that level, they were elected to the League of Ireland for the 1926–27 season. Six seasons later, they became the first club from outside Dublin to win the league title. They are the only club to have won a league title or an FAI Cup in every decade since the 1930s, with four distinct eras of success: the mid-1960s, the late-1970s/early-1980s under Jim McLaughlin, the late-1980s/early-1990s under Turlough O'Connor, and the 2010s led by Stephen Kenny. They have won 48 trophies at national level as of 2025, including 14 League titles and 12 FAI Cups (with four League and Cup 'Doubles'), and have won a further 21 trophies at All-Ireland and provincial level. (Note: see Honours) They were also the winners of both the first and the most recent All-Ireland club competitions.

They made their European debut in the 1963–64 European Cup, and that season became the first Irish side to win an away match in Europe. Their best performance in the European Cup was in 1979–80, when they reached the last 16, and they reached the last 16 of the European Cup Winners' Cup in 1981–82. They are the only Irish club to have qualified more than once for the Europa League group stage and, in 2016–17, they became the first team from Ireland to both win points and win a match at that level of European competition. They remain the only Irish team to have won points in the Europa League group stage as of the 2026–27 European season.

== History ==
=== Dundalk G.N.R. (1903–1930) ===
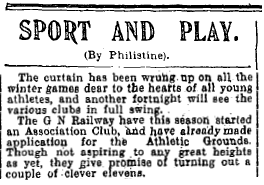
Formation of Dundalk G.N.R. Association Club reported by Dundalk Democrat, 26 September 1903

The Dundalk Great Northern Railway (G.N.R.) Football Club was established during the 1883–84 season as a rugby football club. They played their final rugby match in February 1903, and in September 1903 the club switched codes to association football, setting in motion their journey to become the modern-day Dundalk F.C. The new club, known locally as "the Railwaymen", used the Dundalk Athletic Grounds as their home ground. They played challenge matches at first, then became founder members of the first Dundalk and District League (DDL), formed in 1906. There are no records of the club being active between 1907–08 and 1912–13, but they re-joined the local league in 1913–14 for what was the final season before the outbreak of World War I.

The local league was dormant during the war, but the G.N.R. club entered both the Irish Junior Cup and Leinster Junior Cup competitions during the war years. After exiting the Irish Junior Cup in January 1917, the club was inactive again for the following two seasons. It re-formed for 1919–20, affiliated with the Leinster Football Association, and joined both the Newry and District League and the revived DDL. The G.N.R. club spent three seasons in the DDL, winning it twice, and represented the district in both Junior Cup competitions those seasons. They reached the Leinster Junior Cup final in 1920 (the club's first cup final), which they lost to Avonmore after two replays.

Their junior record led to them being elected to the Leinster Senior League for 1922–23, to replace sides that had been promoted to the nascent Free State League. They spent four seasons at that level, before being elected to the Free State League on 15 June 1926 to replace Dublin club Pioneers, as the national league looked to spread to the provinces.

On 21 August 1926, they travelled to Cork to face Fordsons for their league debut, eventually finishing eighth in the 1926–27 season. The team represented the G.N.R. works in name only by this stage, and the club's management committee decided to make it independent of the company. New colours of white shirts and blue shorts with a crest of the town's coat of arms were adopted in December 1927. They contested their first cup final as a senior club in April 1929, the Leinster Senior Cup final, which they lost after a replay. It was the last time that the club was billed to appear as 'Dundalk G.N.R.', and the name of the club was formally changed to 'Dundalk A.F.C.' in the summer of 1930.

==== Works teams ====
When Dundalk G.N.R. joined the League of Ireland in 1926, it was one of four works-teams in the 10-team league—the others being Jacobs, St. James's Gate and Fordsons. Another railway team—Midland Athletic of the Midland Great Western Railway—had competed for two seasons but had resigned after the company went through a merger. By 1944–45, Dundalk were the only club with works-team roots remaining. In 1948–49, Transport (representing the CIÉ works) were elected to the league. They survived until 1961–62, leaving Dundalk again as the only surviving club with works-team roots. The works themselves became Dundalk Engineering Works Ltd with the demise of the G.N.R.(I) company in 1958.

=== First successes (1930–1949) ===
Chart of yearly table positions for Dundalk in League of Ireland

With a new manager, Steve Wright, Dundalk finished as runners-up in both the League and the FAI Cup in 1930–31, and they won that season's LFA President's Cup, defeating Shamrock Rovers 7–3 in a replay to take the trophy. The club was then reorganised as a membership-based limited company, 'Dundalk A.F.C. Limited', in January 1932.

They became the first team from outside Dublin to win a league title in the 1932–33 season, sealing it in Dalymount Park with their first victory over Bohemians. In becoming champions, they also became the first team from outside Dublin or Belfast to win a league title in Ireland since the inception of the original Irish League in 1890. After winning the league title in 1932–33, they were runners-up once in the League, once in the Shield, twice in the FAI Cup, and twice in the Dublin City Cup, before winning the 1937–38 City Cup—their first national cup final victory.

Hoping to improve revenue, the club decided to move from the Athletic Grounds to a new ground—'Oriel Park'—in 1936. They won their first FAI Cup (in their fourth appearance in the final) with victory over Cork United in Dalymount Park in 1942. Five weeks later, they won the inaugural Dublin and Belfast Inter-City Cup to become (unofficially) 'Champions of All Ireland'. The following September, in the new season, the City Cup was won for a second time.

During the mid-1940s, the management committee relied on player sales to English clubs to bankroll the club, as gate receipts alone did not meet its running costs. After missing out in both the League and the City Cup by a point in 1947–48, the committee decided to invest the surplus from its transfer dealings on several professional players from Scotland and a player-coach, Ned Weir. The investment paid off when the City Cup was won for a third time at the start of the new season by topping its new league format unbeaten, while the club's second FAI Cup was won with victory over Shelbourne in the 1949 final. But the new team fell short in both the Shield and the League and, despite the cup double and improved gate receipts, the additional income was not enough to cover the increase in costs.

=== Struggles and recovery (1950–1964) ===
The attempt to maintain a full-time squad had not paid off and the 1949 cup-winning team was broken up. A surplus from transfer dealings prevented a more serious financial crisis arising, and despite the turnover in players, Dundalk won the Leinster Senior Cup for the first time in 1950–51. The cutbacks started to have an impact, and they finished second from bottom in the league table the following season. They went on a memorable FAI Cup run, however, coming from 3–1 down against Waterford in a semi-final replay to win 6–4 in extra time; then defeated Cork Athletic in the 1952 FAI Cup final (also in a replay), to win the Cup for a third time.

Midway through the 1952–53 season, club secretary Sam Prole left to take over at Drumcondra. Prole, a Great Northern Railway employee, had played for Dundalk G.N.R. in junior football, and had been Secretary for 25 years. He had been responsible for the club's scouting and transfer activities, and player sales tailed off after his departure. The subsequent drop in income obliged the club to further cut costs, and they finished bottom of the league in the two seasons after he left. They continued to struggle for the rest of the decade but, in contrast to their league form, they won their fourth FAI Cup with a 1–0 victory over Shamrock Rovers in the 1958 final.

Having not challenged for the League or Shield during the 1950s, they ended the decade at the top of the league table, with new signing Jimmy Hasty, the 'one-armed wonder', starring for the side. Although they subsequently fell short of winning the title, the club was competitive again. A second Leinster Senior Cup was won in 1960–61, and a first league title in 30 years followed in 1962–63. That success meant that Dundalk entered European competition for the first time, where they became the first Irish side to win an away leg of a European tie by beating FC Zurich, 2–1 (in a 4–2 aggregate defeat), in the 1963–64 European Cup. They could not manage to retain the title that season, finishing as runners-up, and they were also runners-up in the Shield. But they did win the season-end Top Four Cup for the first time.

=== Takeover, rise and fall (1964–1974) ===
A poor 1964–65 followed, and the club's management committee decided that it was time to hire a modern-style manager, who would have sole responsibility for recruitment and player selection. They appointed Gerry Doyle, who had spent most of his career as both a player and a coach with Shelbourne. The new season saw little improvement, however, and with financial losses growing and investment in Oriel Park needed, it became clear early in the 1965–66 season that the membership-based ownership model could not provide the financial support required to take the club forward. A new public limited company took over in January 1966, after the voluntary liquidation of the old company.

The new board invested heavily in both Oriel Park and the squad ahead of the 1966–67 season, and signed a new player-coach, Alan Fox, from Bradford City. The pay-off was immediate. Dundalk finally won their first League of Ireland Shield, then charged to the league title, winning it by seven points, to seal the club's only League and Shield Double. They then won that season's Top Four Cup to complete the club's first 'treble' of trophies in one season.

The following season, Oriel Park hosted European football for the first time with the visit of Vasas SC of Hungary. But Fox fell out with the club's board during the trip to Budapest for the return leg, and he was released the following March, despite his side being set to retain the title. The Dublin City Cup of 1967–68 was his final success at the club. Dundalk subsequently finished as runners-up in the League, qualifying for the 1968–69 Fairs Cup, where they won a European tie for the first time with victory over DOS Utrecht. But fourth-place in the League that season, and another City Cup, was all that the remnants of Fox's team could achieve.

Future Ireland manager Liam Tuohy took over in the summer of 1969 and also joined the board, and as a result of his managerial experience, Dundalk entered the new decade at the top of the league table. But Tuohy was obliged to thin the squad and cut the wage bill because of the scale of the debts still hanging over the club from the redevelopment of Oriel Park, and he could not build a side able to sustain a title challenge. The 1971–72 Shield success would be the high point of his reign, and he quit at the end of that season, criticising a lack of local support in the process. His only other trophy at the club was the 1970–71 Leinster Senior Cup.

Dundalk had to sell or release several players to survive after Tuohy left, and they slid down the table with a young, inexperienced team finishing second from bottom in 1972–73. To recover the situation, a new board took over the running of the club, and hired John Smith from Walsall as player-manager. After renegotiating the club's debts, they were able to provide Smith with funds to sign several players. Smith delivered a Leinster Senior Cup in his first season, but they subsequently fell away in the league after a good start, and Smith quit two matches into his second season for a job outside football.

=== A trophy-laden era (1975–1995) ===
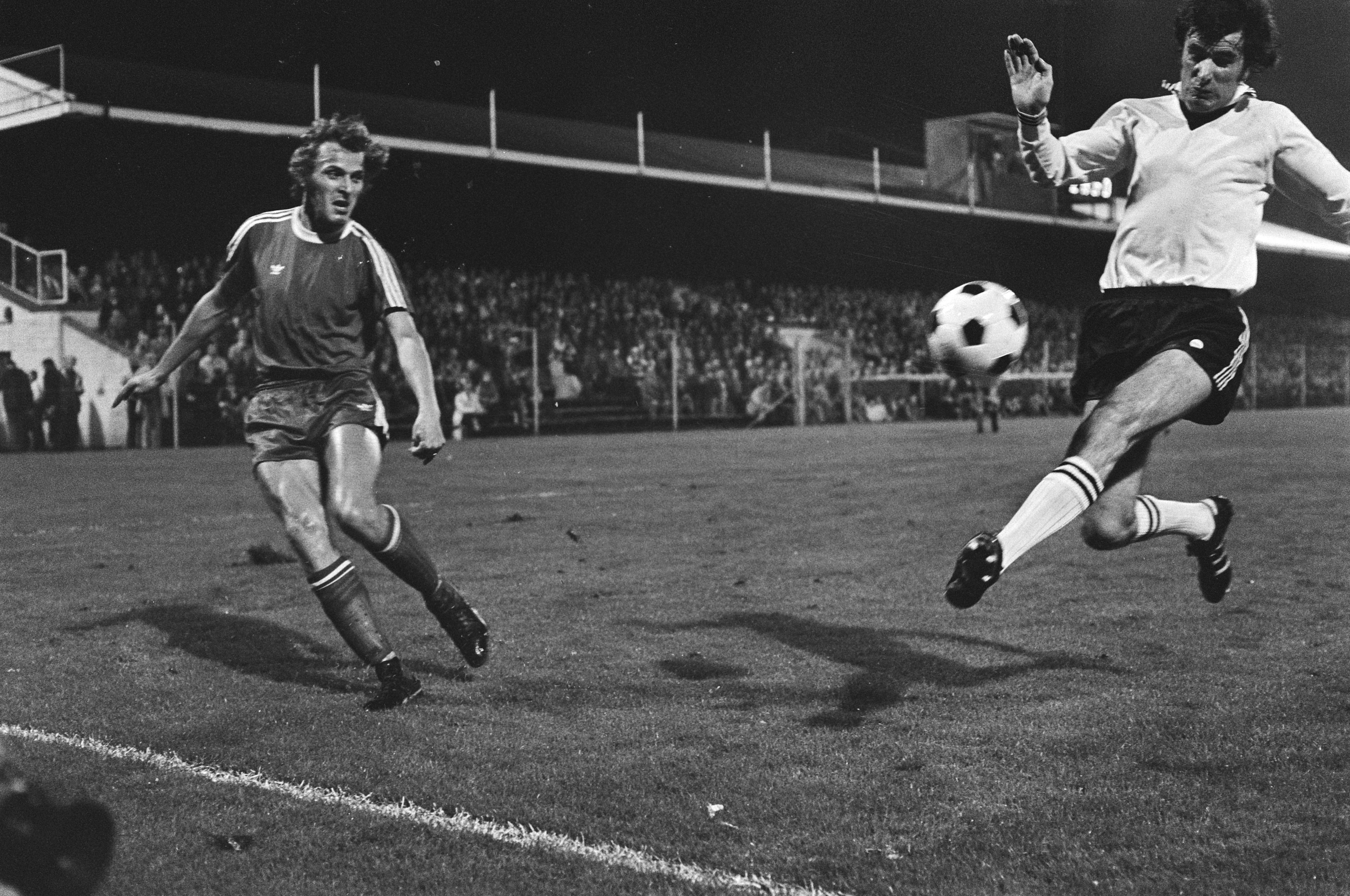
Dundalk player-manager Jim McLaughlin in action away to PSV Eindhoven in 1976

The club then appointed Jim McLaughlin as player-manager in November 1974, and it was under McLaughlin that they recovered and reached a new level of success. With the remnants of Smith's squad and players unwanted elsewhere, he won his first league title (the club's fourth) in 1975–76. The title brought European football back to the town for the first time since 1969 and in the following season's European Cup, they met PSV Eindhoven and were deemed unlucky not to win the first leg at home. They ended the 1976–77 season with two cups in a week, first the Leinster Senior Cup, then the club's first FAI Cup since 1958, when they defeated Limerick United in the final.

League form had been mixed in the two seasons following the league title and, despite winning their first League Cup and retaining the Leinster Senior Cup, a poor end to the 1977–78 league season led to rumours that McLaughlin would be let go. However, the club used the funds from the sale of three players to Liverpool to invest in his squad and to make ground improvements at Oriel. His second league title followed in 1978–79, and they went on to defeat Waterford in the Cup final to complete the club's first League and Cup Double.

The Double winning side's 1979–80 European Cup run the following season, where they narrowly missed out on qualifying for the quarter-finals (losing 3–2 on aggregate to Celtic), was the club's best European performance until 2016. They finished as runners-up in 1979–80 and 1980–81 and achieved their only domestic cup double in 1980–81—winning both the League Cup and the FAI Cup. McLaughlin's third and final league title at the club arrived in 1981–82, after an early season 10-point gap to Bohemians was overhauled. A trophy-less 1982–83 season, which saw them miss out on Europe, saw McLaughlin resign.

After two seasons in mid-table, former player Turlough O'Connor was appointed ahead of the League's split into two divisions in 1985–86. O'Connor quickly built a squad capable of challenging for honours and his sides consistently finished in the top four for the following eight seasons. They won the 1987 League Cup, and finished as runners-up in both the League and the FAI Cup to qualify for Europe for the first time in five years. The following season started with a visit from Cup Winners' Cup holders Ajax Amsterdam, and ended with the club's second League and Cup Double—with the title being won on the last day of the season, and the FAI Cup being won with victory over Derry City.

O'Connor won his second League Cup in 1989–90, and another league title followed in 1990–91 in an end of season, winner takes all match in Turners Cross against Cork City. But Dundalk spurned an opportunity to progress in the European Cup, when a 1–1 draw away to Honved was followed by a 0–2 home defeat. Attendances started to drop noticeably during 1992–93, as the new English Premier League broadcast live on BSkyB was growing in popularity. By the end of the season, the board was facing financial issues that threatened the club's survival—a "healthy" surplus in 1989, had become a serious deficit, with income falling due to some of the lowest gate receipts in memory. The 1993–94 season started with mixed results and, after a home defeat to Monaghan United, O'Connor resigned.

O'Connor was replaced by Dermot Keely, who had captained the club under Jim McLaughlin. The older players were released, and a thin squad struggled—missing out on the 'Top Six' round-robin that decided the title. They played out the final third of the season in a meaningless 'bottom six' round-robin in front of tiny crowds, which contributed to the worsening financial position. Early the following season, the financial issues came to a head, and several local businessmen formed a new interim company to take the club over, saving it from bankruptcy. Despite the financial problems, Keely led his team to the club's ninth league title on a dramatic final day. In third place in the table, they needed to win their match at home to Galway United and for both Shelbourne and Derry City to fail to win their games. Dundalk won their match and with players and fans waiting on the pitch for the other results to filter through, they were eventually confirmed as champions.

=== Decline (1995–2012) ===
The 1994–95 title did not halt the club's decline, and Keely did not see out the title defence, quitting midway through the 1995–96 season—reportedly frustrated at being unable to strengthen his squad. Dundalk sank down the table and had to survive a promotion/relegation play-off in 1996–97. The board turned to Jim McLaughlin (who had retired from management and was now a director at Dundalk) to try to turn things around, but early in the 1998–99 season it was revealed that the club was in serious financial trouble again and that the whole squad had been transfer-listed. An end-of-season collapse saw the club drop from the top-tier for the first time, with relegation confirmed 20 years to the day after they had won their first Double.

The club was taken over by a supporters' co-op in 2000, and initial expectations were of an immediate return to the top-flight. But Dundalk became embroiled in a losing battle with the league's hierarchy and Kilkenny City over the latter playing an improperly registered player, which reached the High Court. The following season, the co-op invested heavily in the playing squad and, under new manager Martin Murray, they were promoted as 2000–01 First Division Champions. Although seemingly well-placed for the return to the top-flight, they were relegated again the following season, with the league being reduced from 12 teams to ten. Despite this setback, Murray's side won the club's ninth FAI Cup a week later, with victory over Bohemians in the final.

After being relegated again, Dundalk were stuck in the lower reaches of the First Division for the next four seasons. During this period, Dundalk City L.F.C., who were loosely affiliated to the club, competed in the Dublin Women's Soccer League. They won the 2005 Women's FAI Cup Final. (Note: This victory is not included in the Dundalk F.C. Honours list, as Dundalk City L.F.C. were considered to be a separate club.)

With no sign of promotion, the co-op members agreed to the club being taken back into private ownership by its CEO, Gerry Matthews. They finished second under new manager John Gill in 2006, securing a play-off tie against Waterford United. Even though they won the play-off, they were still denied a place in the 2007 Premier Division, with Galway United (who had finished third in that season's First Division) selected by the FAI's 2006 IAG Report to be promoted ahead of both Dundalk and Waterford. In 2008, they won promotion back to the Premier Division, pipping Shelbourne to the top spot on the final night of the season. Gill was replaced by Ian Foster for the return to the top flight, despite winning the First Division title.

At first, Dundalk stabilised their position back in the Premier Division—qualifying for the 2010–11 Europa League, leading the league table midway through the 2010 season, and reaching the 2011 Setanta Sports Cup final. But results subsequently deteriorated and, with financial losses mounting as the 2011 season drew to a close, Matthews decided he wanted to exit the club and he let Foster's contract expire. With the club in danger of insolvency during a disastrous 2012, it was taken over by local businessmen Andy Connolly and Paul Brown (owners of the team's official sponsors, Fastfix), and Dundalk subsequently managed to remain in the top-flight by defeating Waterford United in the play-off.

=== Revival and dominance (2013–2020) ===
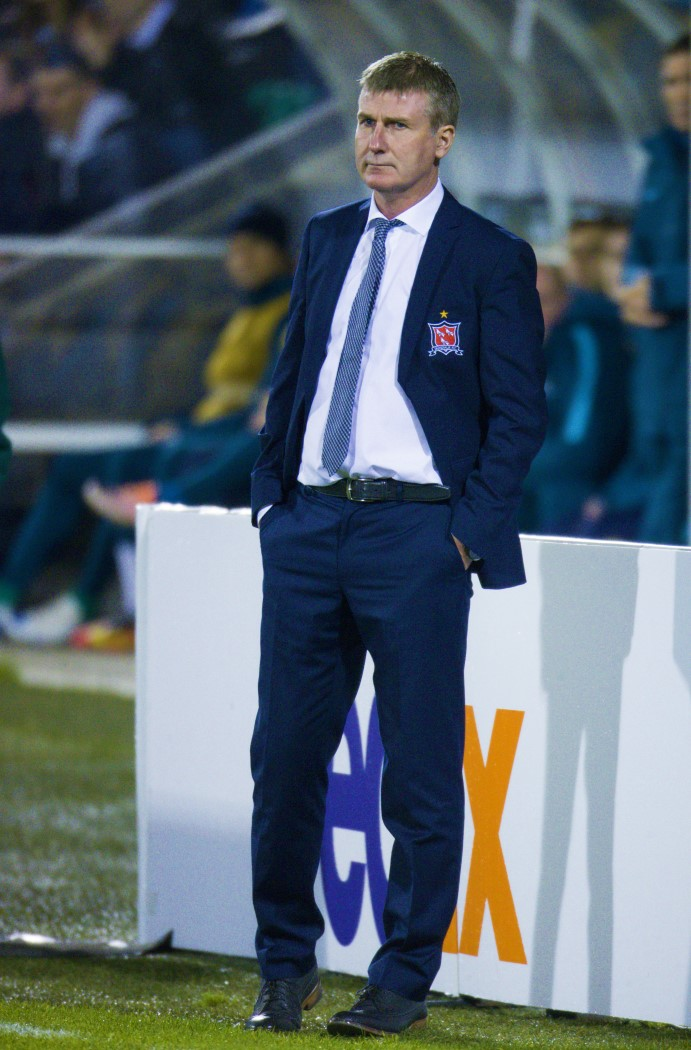
Stephen Kenny, manager 2013–2018

Having saved the club, the new owners turned to Stephen Kenny to become the new manager. They mounted an unexpected title challenge in his first season, eventually finishing as runners-up. Kenny kept the nucleus of the new side together for the following season, and went on to guide the club to its first league title since 1994–95. They also won that season's League Cup, the club's first League and League Cup Double. The 2015 season saw them dominate, winning the club's third League and FAI Cup Double—with the title being won by 11-points and the Cup with victory over Cork City in the final. They also won the Leinster Senior Cup—the club's first 'treble' of trophies since 1966–67.

A third successive league title was sealed with two games to spare in 2016, in the midst of the club's best performance in European competition. They qualified for the Champions League play-off round after they first defeated FH of Iceland, then came from a goal down in the tie to defeat BATE Borisov 3–1 on aggregate. They drew Legia Warsaw for the play-off, with the first leg played in the Aviva Stadium in Dublin in front of a crowd of 30,417. They suffered a 2–0 defeat in the home leg, but shocked Legia in the return leg by taking a 1–0 lead. Legia equalised late in the game and won the tie 3–1 on aggregate. As a result, they were drawn in Group D of the Europa League. They drew with AZ Alkmaar in the Netherlands, and defeated Maccabi Tel Aviv in Tallaght Stadium, to win the first points earned by an Irish club in the group stage of European competition.

The departure of some key players after the European run, and a slow start to the new season, meant that they slipped to runners-up spots in both league and FAI Cup although they won their sixth League Cup. The club's European form had attracted interest from abroad, however, and a consortium of American investors led by PEAK6 completed a takeover in January 2018. Kenny's side reasserted itself in 2018, winning another League and Cup Double—the second under Kenny and fourth in the club's history—breaking points-total and goals scored-total records in the process. In the aftermath, Kenny resigned in order to accept the Republic of Ireland U-21 manager's role.

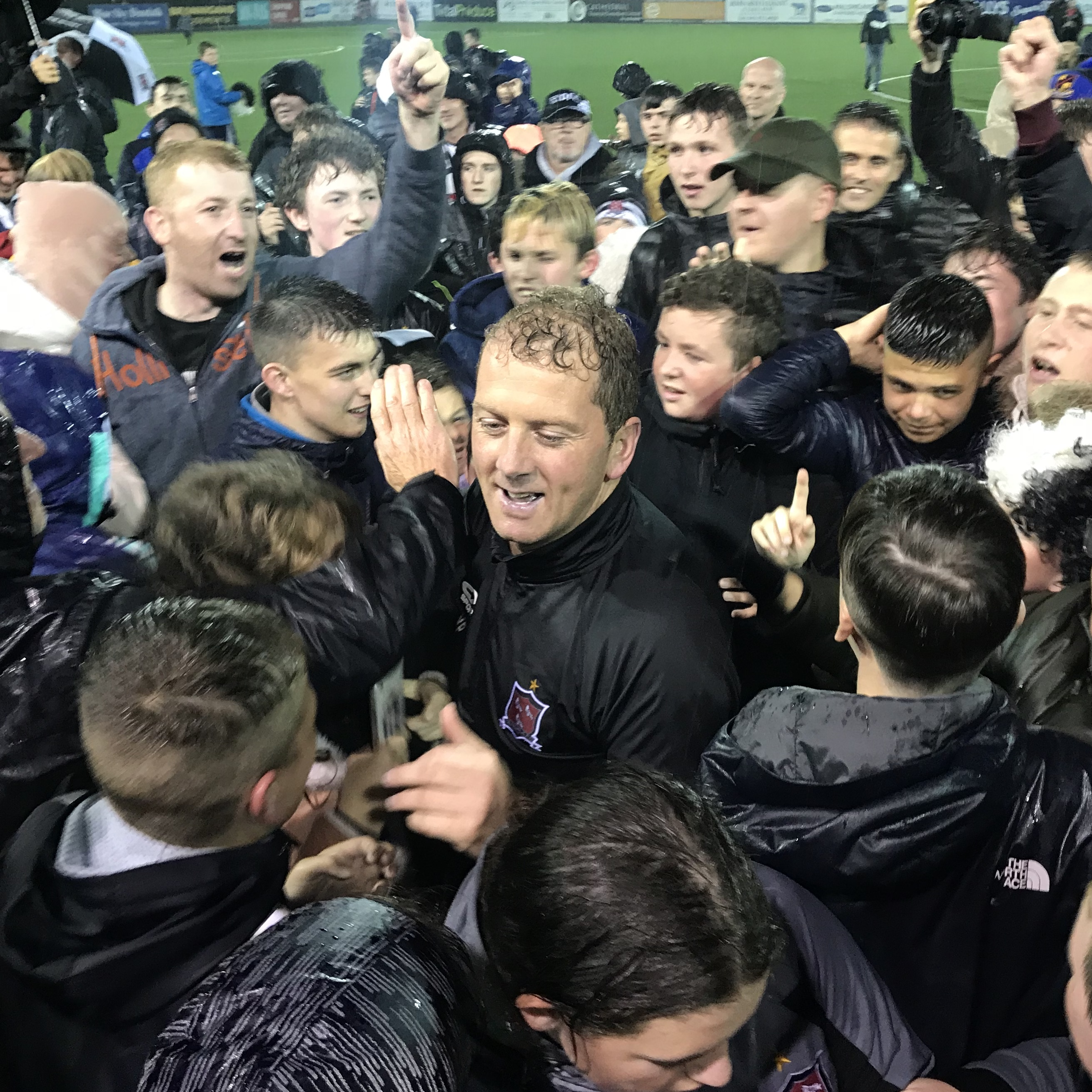
Manager Vinny Perth celebrating the 2019 title win with supporters in Oriel Park

Hoping to achieve continuity, the new owners replaced Kenny with his assistant manager, Vinny Perth, as head coach, with John Gill returning as first-team coach. Despite falling 13-points behind early on, they overhauled the deficit within weeks and went on to win the club's 14th league title with four games to spare. They also won the League Cup by defeating Derry City on penalties in the final, to secure a second League and League Cup Double. They were denied a first domestic Treble of League, FAI Cup and League Cup, however, when they were beaten in a penalty shoot-out in the FAI Cup Final. But they ended the season with a comprehensive 7–1 aggregate victory over Northern Irish champions, Linfield, in the inaugural Champions Cup.

The following season, a goal scored by Jordan Flores went viral and was later nominated for the FIFA Puskás Award. Soon after, the outbreak of the COVID-19 pandemic saw the cessation of football in line with other European countries. The season resumed with a reduced schedule of 18 matches in total and matches being played behind closed doors. Manager Vinny Perth was dismissed following Dundalk's exit from the first qualifying round of the 2020–21 UEFA Champions League. He was replaced by Italian Filippo Giovagnoli. Dundalk subsequently qualified for the group stage of the 2020–21 Europa League after victories over Inter Club d'Escaldes, Sheriff Tiraspol and KÍ Klaksvik in the qualifying rounds. They were drawn in Group B alongside Arsenal, Rapid Wien, and Molde. They failed to win any points and finished bottom of the group.

In the FAI Cup, they had an 11–0 semi-final victory over Athlone Town—setting a new record for the biggest win in the competition's history, which was also a new club record victory. They followed that with a 4–2 extra-time victory over Shamrock Rovers, with David McMillan scoring a hat-trick, to win the Cup for a twelfth time and qualify for Europe for a 25th time.

=== Ownership upheaval (2021–2025) ===
The 2021 season saw Shane Keegan named first-team manager, with Giovagnoli reverting to the position of 'coach' because he did not have a UEFA Pro Licence. The season began with a victory in the President's Cup, but after a run of defeats at the start of the league campaign, both Keegan and Giovagnoli left the club. Dundalk struggled for the remainder of the domestic season with their lowest league finish since 2012, and they went out to Vitesse Arnhem in the third qualifying round of the inaugural Europa Conference League. Before the season ended, the club was returned to local ownership when a consortium led by former co-owner Andy Connolly and sports technology firm STATSports agreed a takeover with Peak6. The new owners then installed former captain Stephen O'Donnell as the club's new head coach in the close season.

In his first season in charge, O'Donnell steered his new-look side to a third-place finish and qualification for the Europa Conference League. They failed to capitalise in 2023, exiting the Conference League in the second qualifying round and finishing mid-table and outside the European qualification places. The club's finances were quickly deteriorating and there was another change of ownership in the close season, when it was taken over by a US-based Irish businessman, Brian Ainscough.

A poor start to the 2024 season resulted in O'Donnell being let go, beginning a turbulent month in which he was replaced by Noel King, whose tenure lasted 25 days before he resigned, citing medical issues. Head of football operations Brian Gartland was sacked following a clash with the owner over King's appointment. Gartland would later sue the club for wrongful dismissal and it was ordered by the Workplace Relations Commission to pay him €64,434 compensation.

The club hired Jon Daly to replace King and there was a brief improvement in form. However, it was subsequently revealed that the club was failing to pay its staff and players and had amassed losses of €1.2 million to the end of 2023, and was in danger of insolvency before the end of the season. Ainscough passed control of the holding company to a Dundalk-based barrister, John Temple, which avoided a mid-season withdrawal from the league. The concurrent collapse in form was not halted and relegation was confirmed before the end of the season, with Daly leaving after the final match.

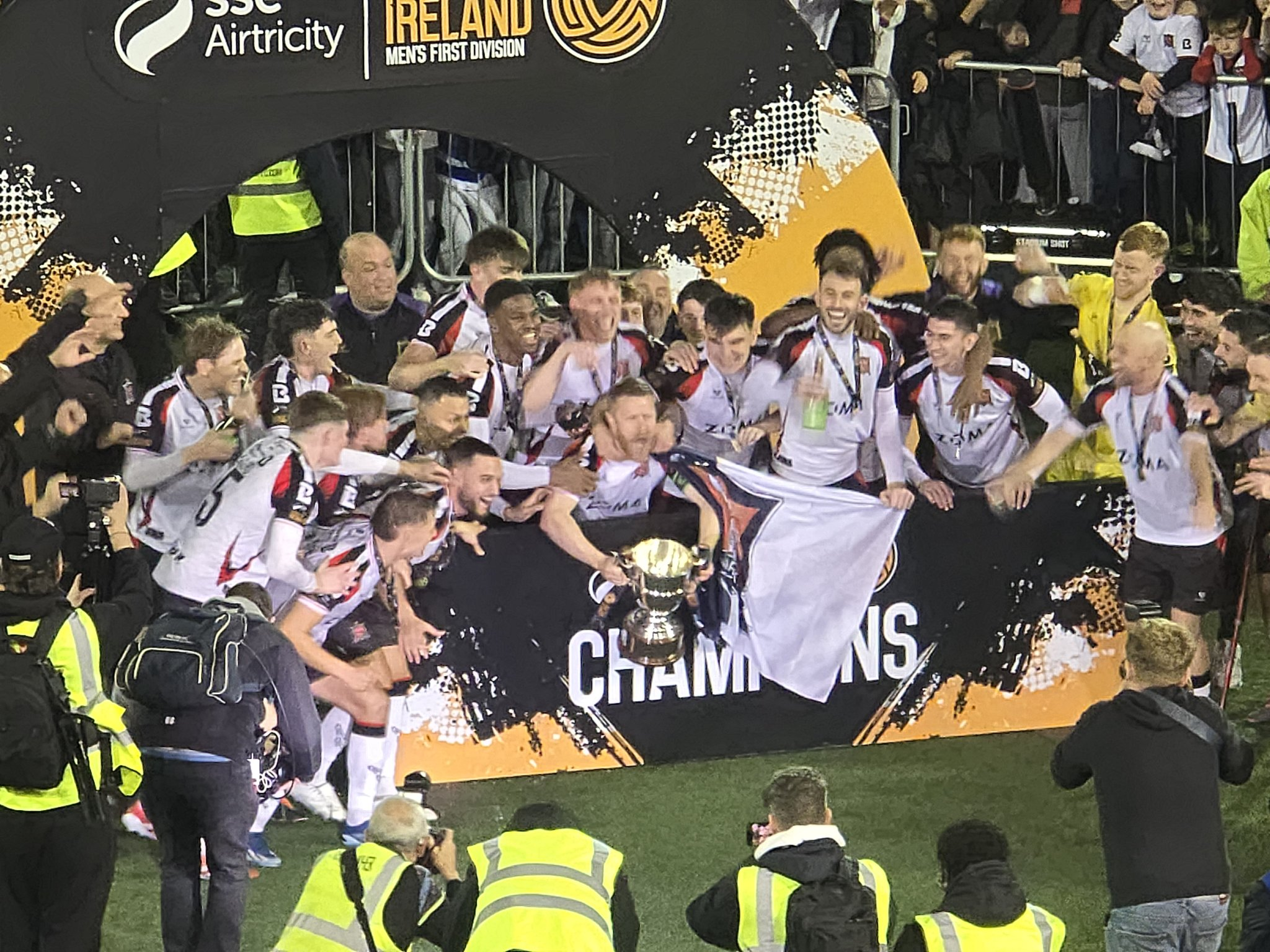
Dundalk win the 2025 League of Ireland First Division

Ciarán Kilduff, who had played for the club during Stephen Kenny's reign, was named the new manager within days. The club was belatedly awarded a licence to compete in the 2025 League of Ireland First Division following Temple's efforts to get the debt situation under control, thus avoiding examinership. They led the table from start to finish, sealing their third First Division championship and automatic promotion with a game to spare. They ended the season by winning the Leinster Senior Cup for the eighth time. The club then saw yet another change of ownership, when minority shareholder Chris Clinton acquired John Temple's shareholding.

=== Return to top-flight (2026-present) ===
Back in the Premier Division for 2026 in what was their 100th season in the League of Ireland, Dundalk under Ciarán Kilduff consolidated their position with a sixth place finish.

== Crest and colours ==
=== Crest history ===
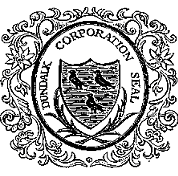
Dundalk Corporation Seal in 1837

After outgrowing its links with the Great Northern Railway, the football club adopted the then coat of arms of the town of Dundalk (three gold martlets on an azure field) in December 1927, and incorporated the crest on the club's new white playing shirts. This coat of arms had represented the town since 1673. It appears as the 'Corporation Seal' in a town plan dated 1675. The crest disappeared from the playing shirts in 1930, however, after the urban district council proposed to remove the 'three black crows' from the town seal. A modified crest was reintroduced to the shirt for the 1952 FAI Cup Final, consisting of three black martlets on a white shield bearing the club name. After some minor redesigns in the following years, the white shield became a red shield with white martlets in 1997, and in 2015 this crest was modified to incorporate a gold star, to commemorate Dundalk's tenth League of Ireland title.

=== Kit history ===
Dundalk's colours have been white shirts with black shorts and black or white socks since the start of the 1940–41 season. There is no evidence of defined club colours in the pre-World War I years. When the club was revived for the 1919–20 season, the colours adopted were black and amber-striped shirts with white shorts. These were changed to a strip of white shirts with the town crest as its badge and blue shorts matching the azure shield of the crest in advance of dropping the 'G.N.R.' moniker and becoming 'Dundalk A.F.C.'. The new colours were first worn on St Stephen's Day 1927 in the opening match of the 1927–28 League of Ireland Shield.

The white and blue colours were worn until 1939 but came to be seen as unlucky because of the number of cup final defeats Dundalk had during the 1930s. Hoping a change would bring luck, the club introduced a sky blue and maroon quartered shirt with white shorts and maroon socks in 1939–40, but they promptly lost to non-league opposition in the first round of that season's FAI Cup, and went back to wearing white shirts for the following season, this time paired with black shorts. Possibly by coincidence, when the clubs of the town amalgamated to form the first Dundalk Association Football Club in 1904, the colours chosen were "white shirt, bearing the Dundalk coat of arms, and black pants". The 'home' colours have remained essentially unchanged with red trims being incorporated since the 1990s. An all-white kit was introduced for the first time in the 1965–66 season, and was also the combination used in 1973–74 and 2003. All-white kits are still worn when required to avoid kit clashes.

Dundalk G.N.R. colours 1919–1927	Dundalk A.F.C. colours 1927–1939	Dundalk A.F.C. colours 1939–40	'Home' colours since 1940

Away colours

The club did not have an official away kit until 1977–78. That season, an all-red kit was produced for the Cup Winners' Cup tie away to Hajduk Split and this became the away kit for domestic games. An all-red away kit was worn against Tottenham Hotspur in 1981 but otherwise official away colours were not required again until the 1990–91 season, when all-red was again adopted. Since then, away kits have usually been based on red or black. The club has twice introduced away colours that pay homage to its G.N.R. roots—in 2016 and again in 2021.

Traditional 'Away' colours – variant 1	Traditional 'Away' colours – variant 2	Traditional 'Away' colours – variant 3	'Away' kit 2016–2017	'Away' kit 2021–2022

Prior to 2019, ad hoc third colours had been worn by the team only when both home and away kits clashed with an opponent's colours. An official third kit was introduced that season for the first time—an all-lilac strip with white and black trim. It was designed by then kit supplier CX+ Sport, as part of a fundraising partnership between the club and Temple Street Children's University Hospital. The logo of the charity replaced that of the official sponsor Fyffes on the chest of the shirt. This kit was worn in all rounds of the successful 2019 League Cup campaign, and in the early rounds of that season's FAI Cup. Since then, third colours are usually based on sky blue.

Third kit 2019	Third kit 2023

=== Kit suppliers ===
The club's kit supplier is Macron as of the 2026 season. They replaced Playr-Fit, who had been the supplier between 2023 and 2025. Previous suppliers include Umbro (2007–2015; 2020–2022, Dundalk-based companies CX+ Sport (2016–2019) and Eros Sportswear (1985–1988), and O’Neills (1976–1984; 1990–2004). Erreà (2005) and Diadora (2006) have each been suppliers for one season while Adidas Teamwear was used temporarily during 1982–83. A Cork-based company, Union Sport, supplied kits for two seasons (1988–89 and 1989–90). Their products were notable in that the company used a Confederate flag (the Battle Flag of the Army of Northern Virginia) as its logo, which featured prominently on team shirts and other apparel.

== Home grounds ==
=== Athletic Grounds ===
Between 1903 and 1936, Dundalk mostly played at the Athletic Grounds near the town centre (land which was eventually sold in 1959 for a factory development). The Athletic Grounds were owned by the Dundalk Young Ireland's Athletic Grounds Company and made available for all local team sports. Dundalk's matches were usually played on Sundays, enabling a large Northern Irish contingent of spectators (inconvenienced by Sunday Observance laws) to attend games. When matches had to be moved to Saturdays, the club suffered financially from lower gate receipts. If the Athletic Grounds were unavailable altogether, then matches were played at the grounds of the Dundalk Educational Institution (now Dundalk Grammar School), the grounds at St Mary's College, or the Carroll's Recreation Ground.

=== Oriel Park ===
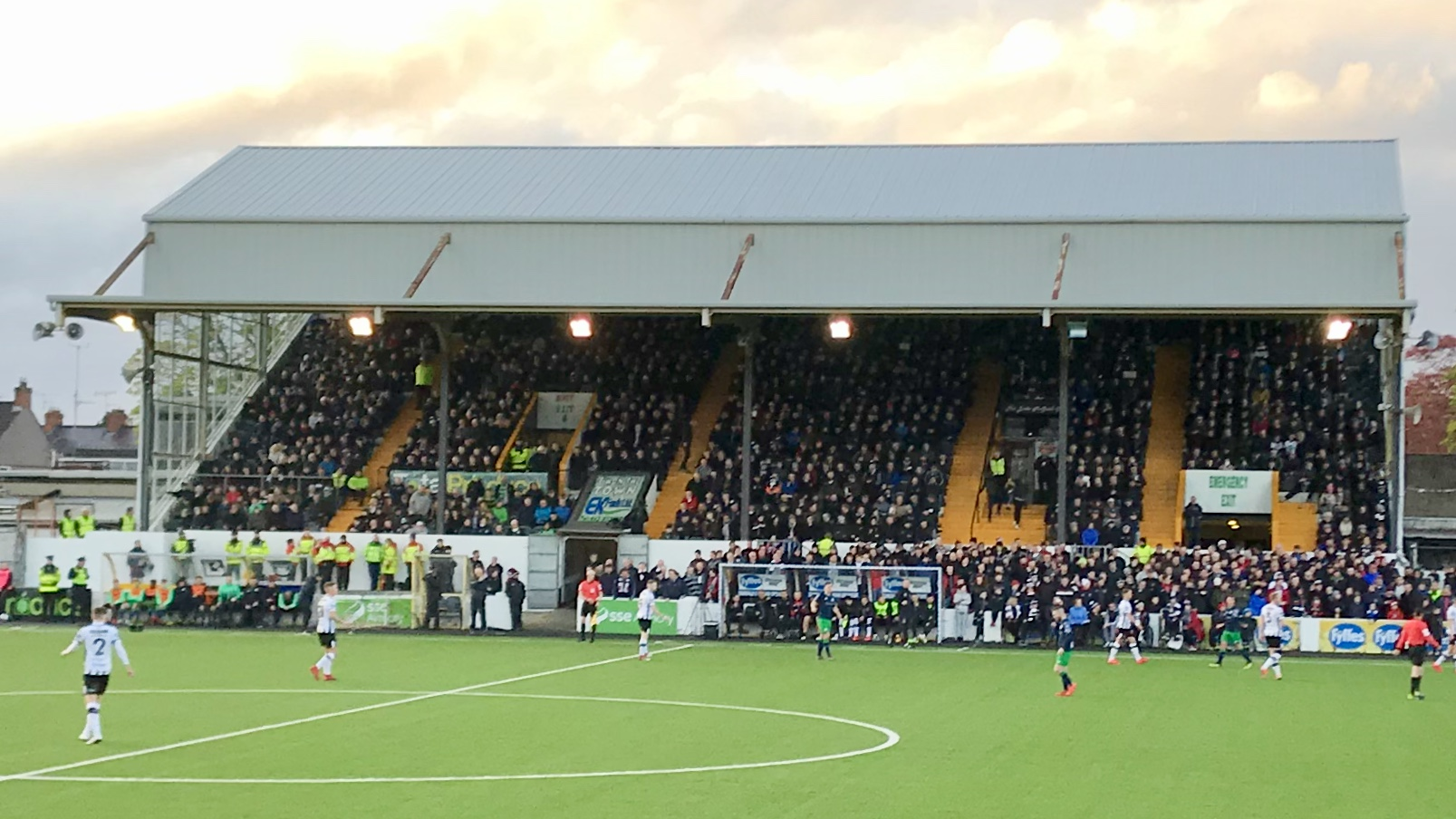
Oriel Park, home of Dundalk Football Club

In 1936, the club moved permanently to land on the Carrick Road made available by former committee member P.J. Casey on a long-term land lease and named the new ground 'Oriel Park'. Cork F.C. were the first visitors to Oriel Park, with the home team winning 2–1. Oriel's attendance record is an estimated 18,000, set in 1982 for Dundalk's European Cup Winners' Cup second round tie against Tottenham Hotpsur (Note: figures of 17,000 to 21,000 have been quoted for the European Cup tie against Cetlic in 1979. However, due to the practice of recording 'gates' in monetary terms, the exact number in attendance at that match is unknown—as children and pensioners were charged lower prices or let in for free.) The ground has had an artificial playing surface since 2005.

Home grounds for European matches

Dundalk played their first home European match, against F.C. Zurich in the 1963–64 European Cup, in Dalymount Park in Dublin—as Oriel Park did not have floodlights. Floodlighting was installed in 1967 to allow matches to be played there—the first being the visit of Vasas SC of Hungary in the 1967–68 European Cup.

Oriel is a Category 2 Stadium, able to accommodate 3,100 seated spectators for European matches. Matches requiring a ground to have Category 3 status have been played in Tallaght Stadium and matches requiring a ground meeting Category 4 status have been played at the Aviva Stadium.

== Supporters ==
The Supporters Club is called 'The 1903', in honour of the football club's year of formation. There is also a Ladies Supporters Club, the 'Lilywhite Ladies'. The Supporters Clubs have raised vital funds in support of the club through the decades, money that was often required to keep the club viable. The current generation of ultras-style fans call themselves the 'Shedside Army'. They are responsible for Oriel's 'tifo' displays. One such display—the flying of Palestinian flags in Oriel Park during a Europa League tie—resulted in a UEFA fine for Dundalk of €18,000.

Dundalk fans have nicknamed the team 'the Lilywhites' and supporters also use 'the Town' as shorthand for the club. Both nicknames have been in use since at least the 1950s. The hashtag #CmonTheTown is used by fans on social media. From when the club was first formed until its change of colours in 1927–28, the team's nickname was 'the Railwaymen'. Later, the team was known as 'the Northerners", or 'the Bordermen' (due to the town's location close to the border with Northern Ireland).

Supporters have two mottoes: "We See Things They'll Never See" owing to the roller-coaster of highs and lows the club has experienced; and "Dundalk Will Never Die But You Will", a riff on a Mogwai album title that references the club's many financial crises. The club anthem is Three Little Birds by Bob Marley and the Wailers.

=== Support base and attendances ===
The club's support base is the Dundalk Municipal District, the adjacent Carrickmacross–Castleblayney Municipal District of County Monaghan, and south County Armagh. The average Friday night home league attendance is approximately 2,700, with attendances at 'bigger' matches of approximately 3,500.

=== Rivalries ===
The Louth Derby is contested between Dundalk and Drogheda United, who entered the League of Ireland in 1963. The clubs played an annual friendly from 1966 to 1984—the Donegan Cup, presented by former Louth TD Paddy Donegan. The friendly was reintroduced as a pre-season match in 1997 with a new trophy—the Jim Malone Cup, in honour of three-time chairman of the board, the late Jim Malone.

The two clubs have rarely competed for honours simultaneously, although they did meet in the final of the 1971–72 League of Ireland Shield, with Dundalk winning 5–0. Many of Dundalk's most successful periods have corresponded with Drogheda being at the lower end of the league table or in the First Division, while Drogheda's most successful period (between 2004 and 2008) occurred while Dundalk were in the lower tier. In addition to the Louth Derby, Dundalk fans would see Shamrock Rovers as their main rivals because Rovers hold the records for both the most league titles and the most FAI Cups, with Dundalk next in the honours list for both competitions.

== Ownership and finances ==
Dundalk Football Club is owned by Dundalk Town F.C. Limited. Chris Clinton has been the majority shareholder since 10 November 2025.

=== Ownership history ===
As an association football club for the workers of the Great Northern Railway works in the town, it was run by a management committee of GNR employees elected by members. The committee converted it to a membership-based limited company, 'Dundalk Association Football Club Limited', on 25 January 1932. This ownership structure survived until the end of 1965, when the company was voluntarily liquidated by the members and the club was taken over by a public limited company, 'Dundalk Football Club Limited', in January 1966.

The financial issues that occurred in late 1994, which saw the club become effectively insolvent, forced the liquidation of the 1966 company. A new company, 'Dundalk AFC Interim Limited', led by former chairman Enda McGuill took over. However, the solvency issues that had faced the club through most of the 1990s arose again in 1998–99, resulting in relegation that season for the first time in the club's history. A membership-based supporters' co-op, 'Dundalk F.C. Co-operative', took over in 2000. The co-op was unable to sustain the investment required to keep the club in the Premier Division, and decided to sell the club's training ground, Hiney Park, to local developer Gerry Matthews to raise funds. Matthews was subsequently invited to join the board as CEO in 2006 and he then took the club into private ownership as 'Dundalk FC Limited' when it was accepted that the co-op had run its course.

Matthews' decision to end his financial support in 2012 led to another threat of insolvency. With the assistance of the Dundalk FC Supporters Trust, the club was rescued by Paul Brown and Andy Connolly—owners of its official sponsor, Fastfix. They formed a new trading company 'Dundalk Town FC Limited' and completed a takeover in time for the 2013 season. Brown and Connolly then sold their interest to a consortium of investors led by the American investment firm Peak6 in 2018. At the end of the 2021 season, the club was returned to local ownership when a group led by the returning Connolly and the owners of sports technology firm STATSports agreed a takeover deal with Peak6. After two seasons, there was another change of ownership, when Irish-American businessman Brian Ainscough took control.

Ainscough's ownership lasted less than a year. It was revealed in September 2024 that the club had amassed losses of €1.5 million to the end of 2023 and was in danger of going out of business. Ainscough's shareholding in the club was subsequently acquired by Dundalk-based John Temple. During Ainscough's tenure, he had brought in several minority shareholders including the US-based businessman, Chris Clinton. Clinton had remained as 'Executive Director' during 2025 and he then acquired Temple's shareholding at the end of the 2025 season.

=== Sponsorship and income streams ===
Dundalk's first shirt sponsor was National Aluminium after shirt sponsorship was introduced in 1980. The company's brand remained on the team's shirts until 1984. From 1987 until 2002, the official sponsor was Harp Lager (the brand being synonymous with the town). Other long-term sponsors included Fyffes, who had a deal that ran from 2012 until 2020.

For the 2026 season, the team playing shirt's chest logo is that of official sponsors, the ZOMA digital marketing agency. The shirt's sleeve and upper back sponsor is (Renault) Blackstone Motors, and the lower back sponsor is UHY business advisory service. There are several other club partners and academy sponsors.

There are other sponsorship arrangements, such as sponsorship of individual players, and sponsorship of individual home matches. The club's Lotto is managed in partnership with Clubforce. There is a merchandise shop at Oriel Park and an online store on the official website. In addition to sponsorship, Oriel Park is made available for junior and schools football, and is also available for rent to private groups and clubs in other sporting codes. The ground's public bar, 'The Lilywhite Lounge', is available for social events, as is the members' bar—the 'Enda McGuill Suite'.

=== Player transfers ===
Transfer fees both paid and received have generally remained undisclosed. Vinnie Leonard was bought by Norwich City in February 2026 for a reported €400,000 up front and "significant add-ons", which would be the club's record transfer fee received.

=== Media ===
==== Live coverage ====
LOITV is a subscription service that makes all League of Ireland matches available to view live worldwide, with clubs being responsible for producing their own live match coverage.

Live radio commentary of matches is broadcast on Dundalk FM (a community station) and LMFM. The radio broadcasts do not have licensing restrictions and can be accessed online in Ireland and globally from the stations' websites.

==== Documentaries ====
Two documentaries centred on the club have been produced. Once In a Lifetime, released in 2015, was a retelling of stories of the club's 1979–80 European Cup campaign.

One Armed Wonder: The Extraordinary Story of Jimmy Hasty, released in 2023, was produced by UEFA TV and told the life story of former Dundalk player Jimmy Hasty. The documentary won the 'Outstanding Short Documentary' award at the 2024 Sports Emmy Awards.

=== Club publications ===
The club's official website is dundalkfc.com. The "DFC Magazine" is the official match-day programme. In addition, the following books have been published about the club:

- 2003: The History of Dundalk F.C. – The First 100 Years, by Jim Murphy
- 2013: C'mon The Town! A Dundalk FC Miscellany, by Jim Murphy
- 2014: CHAMP10NS, by Gavin McLaughlin
- 2015: The Double, by Gavin McLaughlin
- 2016: Making History, by Gavin McLaughlin
- 2018: Taking Back the Throne, by Gavin McLaughlin
- 2019: We See Things They'll Never See, by Gavin McLaughlin
- 2020: Dundalk Football Club: In Black And White, by Daniel Sexton

== Players ==
=== First-team squad ===
As of 12 November 2026.

Note: Flags indicate national team as defined under FIFA eligibility rules; some limited exceptions apply. Players may hold more than one non-FIFA nationality.

No.	Pos.	Nation	Player
3	DF	NIR	Bobby Burns
4	DF	IRL	Mayowa Animasahun
5	DF	IRL	Harvey Warren
6	MF	IRL	Aodh Dervin (vice-captain)
7	FW	IRL	Daryl Horgan (captain)
9	FW	IRL	Cian Dillon
10	FW	ALB	Leo Gaxha
11	MF	IRL	Ronan Teahan

No.	Pos.	Nation	Player
12	DF	IRL	Luke Mulligan
15	DF	IRL	Trevor Clarke
17	MF	IRL	Shane Tracey
18	MF	IRL	Keith Buckley
19	DF	IRL	Sean Spaight
20	GK	IRL	Sammy Safaei
21	FW	SCO	Danny Mullen
27	FW	SCO	Declan McDaid
44	DF	ENG	Tom Grivosti

=== On loan ===
Note: Flags indicate national team as defined under FIFA eligibility rules; some limited exceptions apply. Players may hold more than one non-FIFA nationality.

No.	Pos.	Nation	Player
29	FW	IRL	TJ Molloy (on loan to Armagh City)

=== WDL squad ===
As of 28 July 2026.

Note: Flags indicate national team as defined under FIFA eligibility rules; some limited exceptions apply. Players may hold more than one non-FIFA nationality.

No.	Pos.	Nation	Player
1	GK	IRL	Eden Laughton Taylor
2	DF	IRL	Naomi Dowd
3	DF	IRL	Jessica Cox
4	DF	IRL	Aoife Fanning
5	DF	IRL	Abagail Martin
6	MF	IRL	Megan O'Connor
7	MF	IRL	Sarah Byrne
8	MF	IRL	Jennifer Freeman
9	FW	IRL	Ciara Brady
10	FW	IRL	Alicia Maher

No.	Pos.	Nation	Player
11	FW	IRL	Macy Treanor
12	MF	IRL	Rebekah Clavin
13	GK	IRL	Grace McCabe
14	MF	IRL	Makenzie Crowley
15	FW	NIR	Siun Kirby
16	FW	IRL	Shauna Smyth
18	DF	IRL	Nana Michelle Koudjou
19	FW	IRL	Sophie Hanlon
20	MF	IRL	Liadh Tobin
21	DF	IRL	Caoimhe Carolan

=== Youth teams ===
Dundalk maintains an academy with men's youth teams in the U-14, U-15, U-17, and U-20 age brackets of the 'EA Sports LOI Academy', and a women's team at U-17.

== Club officials ==
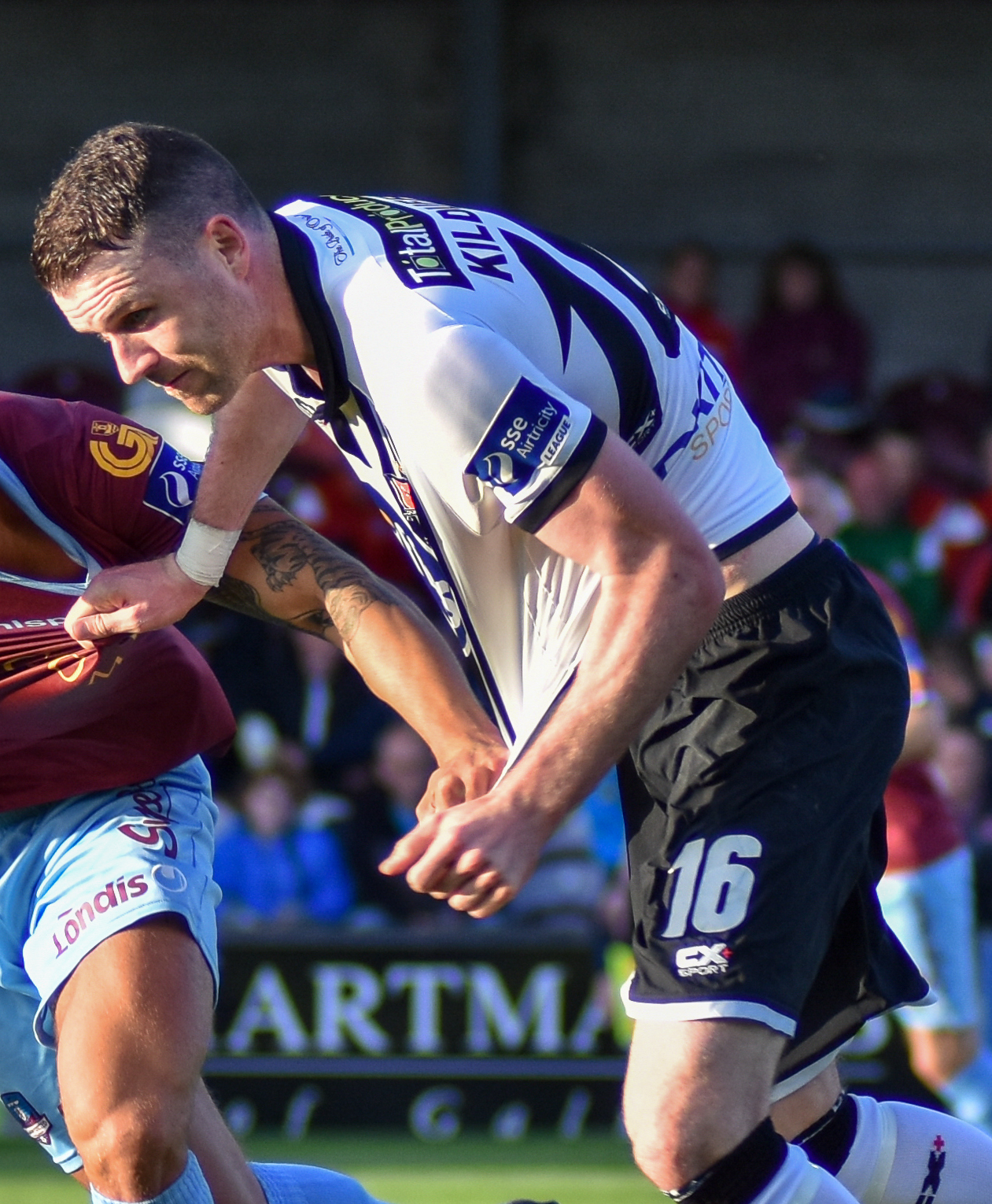
Ciarán Kilduff, current Dundalk F.C. first-tean manager

- Owner: Dundalk Town FC Limited
- Majority shareholder and chairperson: Chris Clinton
- CEO: Joe McGuinness
- Academy Director: Tom Mohan
- Secretary: Padraig McGowan

=== Coaching and medical staff ===
- First-team Manager: Ciarán Kilduff
- Assistant Manager: Ken Kiernan
- Goalkeeping coach: Peter Cherrie
- Head of Women's Football: Bernard Freeman
- Strength & Conditioning Coaches: Ronan Murray and Matthew Freeman

=== Former managers ===
Former managers (Note: interim or caretaker appointments intended to be short term not included)
1926–1929: Joe McCleery; 1929–1930: Harry Beadles; 1930–1934: Steve Wright; 1934–1965: Management Committee (Note: Gerry Doyle was the first modern-style manager. Prior to his appointment, the club employed 'Trainers' or 'Coaches' with the management committee responsible for player recruitment and team selection.); 1965–1966: Gerry Doyle; 1966–1968: Alan Fox; 1968–1969: Tommy Rowe; 1969–1972: Liam Tuohy	1972–1973: Fran Brennan; 1973–1974: John Smith; 1974–1983: Jim McLaughlin; 1983–1984: John Dempsey; 1984–1985: Tommy Connolly; 1985–1993: Turlough O'Connor; 1993–1996: Dermot Keely; 1996–1997: John Hewitt; 1997: Eddie May	1997–1999: Jim McLaughlin and Tommy Connolly; 1999–2000: Terry Eviston; 2000–2002: Martin Murray; 2002–2004: Trevor Anderson; 2004–2005: Jim Gannon; 2006–2008: John Gill; 2009: Seán Connor; 2010–2011: Ian Foster; 2012: Seán McCaffrey	2013–2018: Stephen Kenny; 2019–2020: Vinny Perth; 2020–2021: Filippo Giovagnoli; 2021: Shane Keegan; 2021: Vinny Perth; 2022–2024: Stephen O'Donnell; 2024: Noel King; 2024: Jon Daly

== Records ==
The record for the most appearances in all competitions is currently held by Tommy McConville, who appeared in 580 matches in two stints at the club between 1964 and 1986. Several players have won five league titles—Martin Lawlor being the first to reach the mark. Patrick Hoban is the club's leading goalscorer in all competitions. Five other players—Joey Donnelly, Eddie Carroll, Joe Martin, Jimmy Hasty, and Paddy Turner—have also scored 100 goals or more. Hoban broke Donnelly's club record for league goals during the 2019 season and subsequently became the first Dundalk player to score 100 league goals for the club during the 2022 season. He then broke Donnelly's record for goals in all competitions during the 2023 season and finished his Dundalk career in 2023 with 150 goals.

Bob Egan became the first Dundalk player to win an international cap on 20 April 1929, when he represented Ireland in a 4–0 victory over Belgium. The player who has won the most caps while at the club is Billy O'Neill, who won 11 caps for Ireland—his international career being cut short at the age of 23 by the outbreak of World War II. Mick Fairclough was the most recently capped player, earning two caps in May 1982. In 2021, Raivis Jurkovskis became the first Dundalk player to be capped for a country other than Ireland while at the club.

Dundalk's record win is an 11–0 victory over Athlone Town in the 2020 FAI Cup. The record league win is 9–0, achieved against Jacobs in 1932, and again against Shelbourne in 1980. The biggest victory in a European match is 4–0, achieved with home wins against Fram Reykjavík in the 1981–82 European Cup Winners' Cup, and Newtown in the 2021–22 UEFA Europa Conference League.

The record home attendance is 30,417 v Legia Warsaw in the Aviva Stadium, Dublin for the Champions League play-off round in 2016.

=== European competition ===
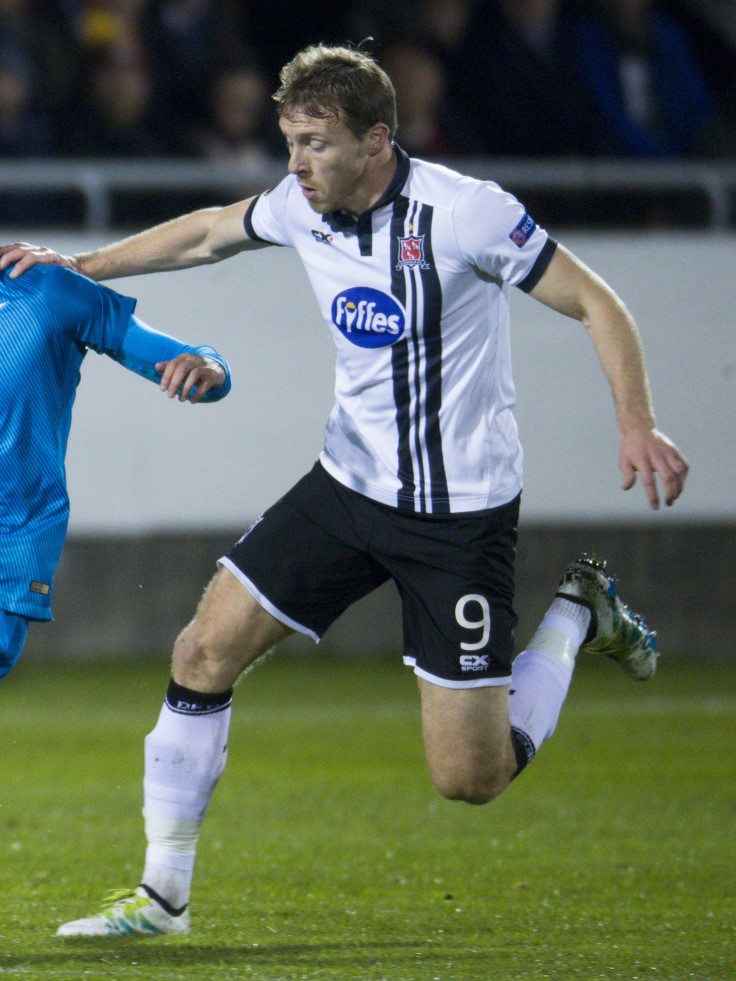
Dundalk's leading European goalscorer David McMillan in action against Zenit St Petersburg in the 2016–17 Europa League.

Dundalk have qualified for European competition 26 times as of the 2024–25 European season. They made their European debut in the 1963–64 European Cup and in that campaign, they became the first Irish side to win an away match in Europe. Their best performance in the European Cup was in 1979–80, when they reached the last 16, and they reached the last 16 of the European Cup Winners' Cup in 1981–82. They have qualified twice for the Europa League group stage and they became the first team from Ireland to both win points and win a match at that level of European competition in 2016–17.

They have played against several major names in European football such as Liverpool, Tottenham Hotspur, Arsenal, Celtic, FC Porto, PSV Eindhoven, Ajax, Red Star Belgrade, Hajduk Split, Legia Warsaw, and Zenit St Petersburg. They have faced opponents from the Netherlands most often, having played ties against PSV, Ajax, DOS Utrecht, AZ Alkmaar, and Vitesse Arnhem.

Overall European record.

As of 3 August 2023.

Competition	Pld	W	D	L	GF	GA
European Cup / UEFA Champions League	33	4	12	17	24	60
UEFA Cup / UEFA Europa League	37	9	5	23	34	73
UEFA Europa Conference League	10	4	4	2	18	13
European Cup Winners' Cup / UEFA Cup Winners' Cup	8	2	1	5	7	14
Inter-Cities Fairs Cup	6	1	1	4	4	25
TOTAL	94	20	23	51	87	185

== Honours ==
Competition	Winners	Seasons	Runners-up	Seasons
National competitions
League of Ireland / Premier Division	14	1932–33, 1962–63, 1966–67, 1975–76, 1978–79, 1981–82, 1987–88, 1990–91, 1994–95, 2014, 2015, 2016, 2018, 2019	12	1930-31, 1936-37, 1942-43, 1947-48, 1963-64, 1967-68, 1979-80, 1980-81, 1986-87, 1988-89, 2013, 2017
FAI Cup	12	1941–42, 1948–49, 1951–52, 1957–58, 1976–77, 1978–79, 1980–81, 1987–88, 2001–02, 2015, 2018, 2020	8	1930–31, 1934–35, 1937–38, 1986–87, 1992–93, 2016, 2017, 2019
League of Ireland First Division	3	2000–01, 2008, 2025	1	2006
President of Ireland's Cup	3	2015, 2019, 2021	3	2016, 2017, 2018
League Cup (discontinued)	7	1977–78, 1980–81, 1986–87, 1989–90, 2014, 2017, 2019	4	1982–83, 1985–86, 1988–89, 1994–95
League of Ireland Shield (discontinued)	2	1966–67, 1971–72	6	1932–33, 1941–42, 1946–47, 1963–64, 1967–68, 1968–69
Dublin City Cup (discontinued)	5	1937–38, 1942–43, 1948–49, 1967–68, 1968–69	8	1935–36, 1936–37, 1940–41, 1947–48, 1965–66, 1966–67, 1970–71, 1983–84
Top Four Cup (discontinued)	2	1963–64, 1966–67	0	
TOTAL	48		42	
All-Ireland, Leinster, and Junior competitions
Champions Cup (discontinued)	1	2019	0	
Dublin and Belfast Inter-City Cup (discontinued)	1	1941–42	1	1948–49
Setanta Sports Cup (discontinued)	0		2	2011, 2014
Leinster Senior Cup	8	1950–51, 1960–61, 1970–71, 1973–74, 1976–77, 1977–78, 2014–15, 2024–25	13	1928–29, 1934–35, 1935–36, 1936–37, 1938–39, 1958–59, 1961–62, 1964–65, 1966–67, 1981–82, 1993–94, 1994–95, 2016–17
LFA President's Cup (discontinued)	9	1930–31, 1951–52, 1963–64, 1964–65, 1979–80, 1980–81, 1981–82, 1988–89, 1989–90	14	1932–33, 1943–44, 1949–50, 1952–53, 1958–59, 1968–69, 1972–73, 1976–77, 1977–78, 1982–83, 1986–87, 1987–88, 1995–96, 2002–03,
Leinster Junior Cup	0		1	1919–20
Dundalk and District League	2	1919–20, 1920–21	1	1921–22
TOTAL	21		32	
