= Association football in the Republic of Ireland =

Football in the Republic of Ireland
- Country: Ireland
- Governing body: Football Association of Ireland
- National team: Republic of Ireland national football team

National competitions
- FAI Cup; FAI Women's Cup

Club competitions
- League of Ireland Premier Division; League of Ireland Women's Premier Division; League of Ireland First Division

International competitions
- Champions League; Women's Champions League; Europa League; Europa Conference League; Super Cup; FIFA Club World Cup; FIFA World Cup (national team); UEFA European Championship (national team); UEFA Nations League (national team)

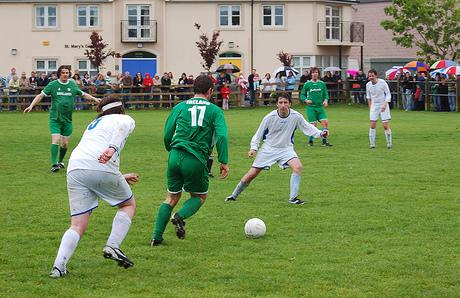
Association football match in Kilkenny

Association football, commonly referred to as football or soccer (to avoid confusion with Gaelic football), is the team sport with the second highest level of participation in Ireland (with five-a-side games being included).

It is the second most popular sport in Ireland and it is also the third most popular spectator sport overall with 16% of total attendances at sports events, behind only Gaelic football (34%) and hurling (23%). Approximately 60% of the people in Ireland are considered association football fans.

The national governing body for the sport is the Football Association of Ireland, which runs the national football team and the League of Ireland, which is the top level of the sport in the country. The term "football" is used interchangeably in Ireland between association football and Gaelic football. Rugby union, another popular type of football, is generally called "rugby", while rugby league, Australian Rules football and American football are niche and minority sports usually referred to by their long title.

For spectators in Ireland, English football is extremely popular compared with the domestic league, with up to 120,000 Irish fans travelling to watch games in the UK each year and 40,000 Irish fans travelling to watch games in the UK on a regular basis Irish school children are commonly seen wearing replica shirts of English league teams. In addition two Scottish football clubs with strong Irish roots, Celtic F.C. and, to a lesser extent, Hibernian F.C. maintain strong followings in Ireland.

In its earliest days, association football was largely confined to the city of Dublin and its surrounding county. Gradually it became more widespread throughout the country, to the point where in the modern day there are clubs in all of the counties of Ireland. Currently, average league attendances at matches in the League of Ireland Premier Division is around 3,000. Many of the country's top players move to leagues outside of the country, particularly the Premier League in England, which is one of the reasons why significant numbers of locals follow clubs in that league. Having said that, the best Irish players have always followed the best wages. This did not stop the game entering into a "golden period" after the second world war when grounds would be full every weekend to watch a league game. It was the start of televised football in England, and the amateur setup in Ireland, that led to a decrease in attendances and a lack of support for the home teams.

The sport is played at all levels in the country. The national team's performance in the 1990 FIFA World Cup, where they reached the quarter-finals is their best to date.

== History ==
Although the sport was being played in Ireland in the 1860s, it was mainly based in Ulster and it was not until the 1880s that the game spread to other areas of the country. The Leinster Football Association was formed in 1892 as the game became more popular in the area. Clubs from outside the Belfast area thought that the IFA favoured Ulster based clubs and when the IFA reneged on a promise to play the Irish Cup semi-final replay in Dublin and instead scheduled the match for Belfast a meeting of southern associations and clubs was arranged and on 1 June 1921, the Football Association of Ireland (FAI) was formed in Molesworth Hall in Dublin. The League of Ireland was established in 1921, with eight teams taking part. St. James's Gate F.C. won the first title, and they were also winners of the first FAI Cup, then called the Free State Cup, in 1922. In 1923, the FAI was recognised by FIFA as the governing body of the Irish Free State under the name Football Association of the Irish Free State (FAIFS) and at the 1924 Olympics, the Irish Free State made their international debut. On 28 May at the Stade Olympique, they beat Bulgaria 1–0, with Paddy Duncan scoring the team's first ever goal. As a result of this they qualified for the quarter-finals. On 14 June 1924, the Irish Free State made their home debut against the United States, who had embarked on a brief European tour after competing in the same Olympics. Ed Brookes scored a hat-trick in a 3–1 home win at Dalymount Park. The Irish Free State did not play their next game until 21 March 1926. This was an away game against Italy which they lost 3–0. In subsequent years the status of the Olympic Games football competition was downgraded and as a result this game is widely regarded as the Irish Free State's first official game.

The 1930s saw the erosion of Dublin's dominance in the league. During the 20s, Bohemians, St James's Gate, Shelbourne and Shamrock Rovers had a monopoly over the domestic game, but Dundalk and Sligo Rovers both won championships while Cork F.C. and Waterford collected FAI Cups as football spread to the provinces. The Second World War curtailed international matches between 1939 and 1946, but league football went ahead with Cork United F.C. dominating, winning four titles between 1940 and 1945. On the international front, England won a match at Dalymount Park 1–0, but Ireland got their revenge three years later when they became the first 'foreign' side to defeat England on English soil. Ireland won the Goodison Park encounter 2–0.

In 1953, FIFA directed both the FAI and IFA to pick players only from within their own boundaries rather than picking players from all over the island. FIFA also ruled that the FAI's team would be known as the Republic of Ireland with the IFA's side being called Northern Ireland. Up to that point, both Associations referred to their teams as 'Ireland'. The Dublin based clubs reasserted their dominance with only Cork United capable of challenging their dominance. 1958 saw a League of Ireland side enter European competition for the first time with Shamrock Rovers going out 9–2 on aggregate to Manchester United in the first round of the European Cup.

In the 1960s Waterford United became one of the league's most successful clubs as they won three titles during the decade, though Shamrock Rovers were the team of the 60s. The Hoops won six FAI Cups in a row during the 60s, a feat that has never been repeated. In 1969 the FAI decided to appoint a national team manager instead of a team of selectors. Mick Meagan became the first manager. They still failed to win any of their qualifiers for the 1970 World Cup. Ireland finished bottom of their qualification group for the 1972 European Championship, ending Meagan's tenure as manager. Liam Tuohy briefly replaced him. Johnny Giles became the Republic of Ireland's first ever player-manager before the 1976 European Championship qualifiers, but the side again failed to qualify. During the qualifiers for the 1980 European Championship, the Republic of Ireland took on Northern Ireland in a historic first ever meeting between the two sides. A 0–0 draw at Dalymount Park was marred by rioting in Dublin on the day of the match. Domestically, no team really dominated as the popularity of the game began to diminish. The major achievement was Dundalk's progress to the last 16 of the European Cup in 1979 when they eventually went out to Glasgow Celtic.

The domestic game went from bad to worse during the 1980s with clubs all over the country struggling for finance. Shamrock Rovers were forced out of their home, Glenmalure Park, while St Patrick's Athletic were forced to move out of Richmond Park towards the end of the decade although they subsequently returned in 1993. On the field, Shamrock Rovers were again the team to beat as they won four consecutive titles, though provincial clubs Athlone, Dundalk and Derry City also claimed titles. The 1990s saw an improvement in the game domestically. Facilities countrywide improved, as did the standard of football. Shelbourne and St Patrick's Athletic dominated the decade, winning four league titles between them, with Shelbourne also winning three FAI Cups.

The national game received a huge boost when the Republic, under Jack Charlton, qualified for the 1988 European Championship—their first ever major finals—where they won their first game 1–0 against England. This was followed by qualification for the World Cup in 1990, 1994 (where they beat Italy) and 2002. The Saipan incident, over the facilities and preparation for the 2002 World Cup, had far-reaching effects on the sport in Ireland. Team captain Roy Keane went home (or was sent home) before the start of the tournament after a public quarrel with manager Mick McCarthy. The FAI commissioned a report from external consultants Genesis, into its World Cup preparations. The "Genesis Report" agreed with many of Keane's criticisms, finding that the FAI structure was not conducive to good planning, made a range of recommendations. Brendan Menton resigned as FAI General Secretary, and the media linked the two events, though Menton denied this. A second Genesis report, this time produced by the FAI but disingenuously called "Genesis II" (or the "White Paper"), in 2005 recommended a radical overhaul of the League of Ireland and led to the appointment of an assessment group. A joint implementation committee made major changes to the league, including merging the league with the FAI, changing the management structure and revamping the league structure.

The League of Ireland entered its best ever era in the 2000s when Bohemians knocked Aberdeen out of the UEFA Cup and beat Kaiserslautern of Germany in the next round. A brief period of mixed results turned for the better in 2004. Shelbourne became the first team to get to the third qualifying round of the Champions League, where they knocked out by Spanish club Deportivo La Coruña 3–0 on aggregate. However, the league continued in improving results and thanks in part to Cork City making progress in the Champions League qualifiers, and Derry City beating IFK Gothenburg and Gretna in the UEFA Cup before falling in the final tie before the group stage. In 2008, it got its second best co-efficient in its history. The League of Ireland in 2007 was won by Drogheda United—their first ever league championship. The league entered difficult times along with the Irish economy during 2008 and 2009.

In 2011 the League got the best co-efficient in its history as Shamrock Rovers made history by becoming the first Irish club to reach the group stages of the Europa League Brave battlers reach the group stage | UEFA Europa League 2011/12.

As of 2026, the league is ranked 31st in Europe out of 55. The league has scored at least 1.000 in every year since 2003, meaning it is currently in its best European cycle to date.

The Republic of Ireland, Scotland and Wales jointly bid to co-host UEFA Euro 2020, with this bid failing. Ireland was picked to host 4 matches in the tournament set to be hosted across 12 countries instead. However, due to the COVID-19 pandemic, the attendances were reduced and Ireland were stripped of hosting rights due to lockdown restrictions. Ireland were announced as co-hosts for UEFA Euro 2028 along with England, Wales, Scotland and Northern Ireland, with Northern Ireland withdrawing later. The Aviva Stadium in Dublin is set to host 7 matches under the name 'Dublin Arena'.

== League system ==
The senior Republic of Ireland football league system consists of the League of Ireland, and a new third tier competition introduced in 2026, the FAI National League. This new division is expected to include promotion to the First Division from 2027. The League of Ireland was established in 1921. The League of Ireland consisted of one division up to 1985, when it split into the Premier Division and First Division. In 2008, the A Championship was introduced below the league as a preparatory division for entry into it. The league season ran from March to November. This division folded after the 2011 season.

Another change undergone by the league has been the introduction of professionalism into some clubs, and the majority of Premier Division clubs. Clubs were previously semi-professional. These changes were mainly made in an effort to better performances in European competition by League of Ireland clubs. The improvements provided by professionalism, particularly in fitness, produced significantly better results in European competition, but proved to be somewhat unsustainable for some clubs, with the vast majority of the clubs involved suffering severe financial collapses but these clubs have been outpassed by more financially stable clubs and the league has kept up its impressive performances.

In 2006 the FAI completed a merge with the League of Ireland. This merge involved changes to league format which were to be gradually introduced over the next three years. The changes included the introduction of the A Championship which would provide non-league and amateur clubs a chance to win promotion to the First Division which, up to that stage, had no clubs actually relegated. Clubs who finished in last place had to re-apply for league membership, however.

The league has received more media coverage in recent years. RTÉ and TG4 have previously shown live matches and/or highlights of Premier Division games, and in 2025, Virgin Media announced a deal to broadcast one match from each round of the Premier Division, for a total of 36 matches. Along with the Virgin Media coverage, the League of Ireland runs a streaming service known as LOITV, which broadcasts local coverage of every Premier Division and First Division match live.

=== Divisions ===
The Premier Division currently contains 10 clubs. The 10 clubs play each other four times which gives a total of 36 matches each. The bottom placed club will be relegated to the League of Ireland First Division and the team who finishes in 9th position will enter a promotion/relegation playoff with a First Division qualifier. The League of Ireland First Division was introduced in 1985. Currently, there are 10 teams in the First Division, and they play each other four times. The A Championship was introduced in the 2008 season as a new third tier, below the League of Ireland. The division was split into 2 separate groups competing independently of each other. The A Championship was replaced by the 2011–12 FAI U19 League in 2012. This FAI U19 League has since been replaced by the League of Ireland Academy, consisting of boys teams at under-14, 15, 17 and 20 level along with girls teams at under-17 and 23 level, whilst its status as the third tier has been replaced by the FAI National League.

=== UEFA ranking ===
As of September 2026, the League of Ireland is 32nd out of 55 in the UEFA country coefficient. The League of Ireland's UEFA coefficient accumulates to a total value of 16.343 as of 2026. From 1998 to 2010, the league's place on the coefficient table rose 15 places, the highest of any league in Europe. The league fell from its highest ever ranking of 29th in June 2010 to 42nd in 2016. Its position of 43rd in 2013/14 was also its lowest position since 1998. The performances of Dundalk in UEFA competition throughout the late 2010s and early 2020s rose Ireland's coefficient significantly, with their qualification for the UEFA Europa League group stage in 2016-17 and 2020-21 helping the LOI to rise to 37th in 2021. The introduction of the UEFA Conference League in 2022, and the performances of Shamrock Rovers and Shelbourne in reaching the league phase of this competition has bolstered the League of Ireland's coefficient further, with the league sitting in between Iceland and Armenia in 32nd position as of 2026.

- 32 (Republic of Ireland) Ireland

=== Provincial leagues ===
Two provinces in the country, Munster and Leinster run a league. These leagues are amateur leagues, though, and clubs cannot be promoted to the League of Ireland. Some of the top clubs in these leagues do compete in the FAI Cup, however. These leagues do not gain much media coverage certainly on a national level.

=== Local amateur football ===
Many counties in the country run a local league. These leagues do not provide promotion to provincial leagues but are still run. An example of one such league is the North Tipperary District Soccer League which is run in north County Tipperary. This particular league contains four divisions and also a youth division.

== Cup competitions ==
The FAI Cup is the national cup competition of the country. It was first run in 1922. The tournament has a straight knockout format with non-league and junior sides competing in the first round before the league clubs join in the second round.

The League of Ireland Cup is the other main cup in the country. It was first held in 1974. This tournament's format has changed over the years. Previously it had group stages in the opening round but it now is straight knockout but clubs are divided into regional groups in the opening rounds. All 22 league clubs take part with the addition of 2 non-league clubs in order to bring the number up to 24. The 2020 season of this competition was deferred due to the COVID-19 pandemic, and it has not been revisited as of 2026.

Provincial senior cup competitions such as the Leinster Senior Cup and Munster Senior Cup also run and include all League of Ireland teams from their given province, as well as a selection of intermediate clubs.

League of Ireland clubs also compete in the cross-border Champions Cup against teams from Irish League in Northern Ireland. This is a two-legged affair between the champions of each jurisdiction. .

The FAI Women's Cup is the women's version of the FAI Cup and the All-Island Cup is a cross-border women's competition between League of Ireland and Premiership teams. The competition consists of a group stage and knockouts.

The Scottish Challenge Cup for senior clubs playing below the Scottish Premiership invites clubs from Republic of Ireland to take part. It also features the Under 20 sides from the Scottish top tier as well as Welsh and Northern Irish clubs. Recently, Conference level English teams have also taken part.

Defunct cup competitions include:

- Texaco Cup
- Blaxnit Cup
- Setanta Sports Cup
- Dublin City Cup
- Dublin and Belfast Intercity Cup
- FAI Super Cup
- League of Ireland Shield
- Top Four Cup

In Republic of Ireland there are also various local amateur, intermediate and junior leagues which run cup competitions for their respective clubs throughout the country.

== Qualification for European competitions ==
Competition	Who Qualifies	Notes
UEFA Champions League first Qualifying Round	Premier Division champions	
UEFA Conference League second Qualifying Round	Premier Division runners-up	
UEFA Conference League first Qualifying Round	Premier Division 3rd place	
UEFA Europa League first Qualifying Round	FAI Cup winners	If FAI Cup winners finish 1st in the League of Ireland Premier Division, this allocation goes to 2nd place, and each qualification moves down one place.

== Republic of Ireland national team ==
The Republic of Ireland's first competitive international finished in a 1–0 victory against Bulgaria on 28 May 1924 in the Olympics. They have never won any major international competitions and had never qualified for a major tournament until 1988. Since then they have enjoyed relative success qualifying for three of the last seven World Cups. The furthest they reached was the quarter-final in 1990.

See also League of Ireland XI

== Women's football ==
Women's football is growing in the Republic of Ireland. The Women's National League (Ireland) was resurrected in 2011. There is a national team also which compete on an international basis. They played in their first world cup at the 2023 FIFA Women's World Cup.

== Stadiums used for association football in the Republic of Ireland ==
Stadium	Capacity	Club/Team
Aviva Stadium	51,700	Republic of Ireland
Tallaght Stadium	10,547	Shamrock Rovers
Dalymount Park	7,955	Bohemians
Tolka Park	9,680	Shelbourne
Turners Cross	7,485	Cork City
Oriel Park	6,000	Dundalk
Eamonn Deacy Park	5,000	Galway United
Markets Field	3,200	Treaty United (Limerick)
Waterford Regional Sports Centre	3,125	Waterford United
Finn Park	4,000	Finn Harps
Carlisle Grounds	3,250	Bray Wanderers
Lissywoollen	3,000	Athlone Town
Richmond Park	5,500	St Patrick's Athletic
The Showgrounds	5,500	Sligo Rovers
United Park	2,000	Drogheda United
Ferrycarrig Park	3,000	Wexford Youths
Bishopsgate	4,500	Longford Town
Stradbrook Road	2,000	Cabinteely F.C.
UCD Bowl	3,000	U.C.D.
Mounthawk Park	1,150	Kerry F.C. (Tralee)

Croke Park, Thomond Park and the RDS Arena have been used as football venues during the construction of the Aviva.

== Support ==
=== Polling ===
==== Nationwide ====
Most supported Premier League clubs in Ireland (Meta Platforms, 2024)
Club	Fans
Liverpool	443,500
Manchester United	441,000
Chelsea	254,100
Arsenal	246,400
Manchester City	209,600
Tottenham Hotspur	150,700
Everton	142,600
Leicester City	133,800
Aston Villa	128,500
Newcastle United	113,400

Most supported football clubs in Ireland (Empathy Research, 2020)
Club	Country	%
Manchester United	England	33%
Liverpool	England	29%
Celtic	Scotland	14%
Arsenal	England	10%
Barcelona	Spain	8%
Cork City	Ireland	7%
Chelsea	England	6%
Manchester City	England	4%
Tottenham Hotspur	England	4%
Dundalk	Ireland	4%

==== By province ====
Most supported football clubs in Ireland by province (Empathy Research, 2020)
Club	Country	Percentage				
Club	Country	Connacht/ Ulster	Dublin (Note: Part of Leinster)	Leinster (Note: Excluding Dublin)	Munster	Total
Arsenal	England	7%	6%	14%	11%	10%
Barcelona	Spain	5%	7%	9%	11%	8%
Bohemian	Ireland	—N/a	6%	—N/a	—N/a	—N/a
Celtic	Scotland	13%	15%	14%	15%	14%
Chelsea	England	5%	8%	5%	5%	6%
Cork City	Ireland	—N/a	—N/a	—N/a	24%	7%
Dundalk	Ireland	—N/a	—N/a	10%	—N/a	4%
Finn Harps	Ireland	4%	—N/a	—N/a	—N/a	—N/a
Galway United	Ireland	10%	—N/a	—N/a	—N/a	—N/a
Heart of Midlothian	Scotland	—N/a	—N/a	5%	—N/a	—N/a
Leeds United	—N/a	—N/a	—N/a	5%	—N/a	—N/a
Limerick	Ireland	—N/a	—N/a	—N/a	6%	—N/a
Liverpool	England	27%	29%	37%	24%	29%
Manchester City	England	—N/a	6%	—N/a	—N/a	4%
Manchester United	England	27%	37%	29%	35%	33%
St Patrick's Athletic	Ireland	—N/a	4%	—N/a	—N/a	—N/a
Shamrock Rovers	Ireland	—N/a	10%	—N/a	—N/a	—N/a
Sligo Rovers	Ireland	12%	—N/a	—N/a	—N/a	—N/a
Tottenham Hotspur	England	4%	—N/a	—N/a	9%	4%
West Ham United	England	—N/a	—N/a	—N/a	6%	—N/a

== Attendances ==
The average attendance per top-flight football league season and the club with the highest average attendance:

Season	League average	Best club	Best club average
2025	3,741	Bohemian	5,860
2024	3,489	Shamrock Rovers	6,071
2023	3,287	Shamrock Rovers	6,085
2022	2,722	Shamrock Rovers	5,379
2021	—	—	—
2020	—	—	—
2019	2,159	Shamrock Rovers	3,445
2018	2,139	Cork City	4,086
2017	1,898	Cork City	4,562
2016	1,455	Dundalk	2,717
2015	1,695	Cork City	3,271
2014	1,559	Cork City	3,777
2013	1,564	Shamrock Rovers	2,787
2012	1,645	Shamrock Rovers	3,022
2011	1,613	Shamrock Rovers	3,864
2010	1,612	Shamrock Rovers	3,918
2009	2,032	Shamrock Rovers	3,323
2008	1,796	Cork City	3,267
2007	1,715	Cork City	1,715
2006	1,548	Derry City	3,200
2005	1,759	Cork City	3,641
2004	1,858	Cork City	4,033
2003	2,338	Cork City	4,147
