= 1985–86 League of Ireland Premier Division =

1st season of the League of Ireland Premier Division

League of Ireland Premier Division
- Season: 1985–86
- Teams: 12
- Champions: Shamrock Rovers (13th title)
- Relegated: Shelbourne; UCD
- European Cup: Shamrock Rovers
- UEFA Cup: Galway United
- UEFA Cup Winners' Cup: Waterford United
- Top goalscorer: Tommy Gaynor (Limerick City); 15 goals

The 1985–86 League of Ireland Premier Division was the first season of the League of Ireland Premier Division. The Premier Division was made up of 12 teams.

== Overview ==
The top tier of the League of Ireland was renamed the Premier Division in 1985. The Premier Division was contested by 12 teams and Shamrock Rovers F.C. won the championship. The top 12 teams from the 1984–85 League of Ireland automatically qualified for the Premier Division.

== Teams ==
=== Stadia and locations ===
Locations of Premier Division teams

Team	Hometown/Suburb	Stadium	Manager
Athlone Town	Athlone	St Mel's Park	(Republic of Ireland) Con Flanagan
Bohemians	Phibsborough	Dalymount Park	(Republic of Ireland) Billy Young
Cork City	Cork	Turners Cross	(Republic of Ireland) Noel O'Mahony
Dundalk	Dundalk	Oriel Park	(Republic of Ireland) Turlough O'Connor
Galway United	Galway	Terryland Park	(Republic of Ireland) Tony Mannion
Home Farm	Drumcondra, Dublin	Tolka Park	(Republic of Ireland) Mick Lawlor
Limerick City	Limerick	Jackman Park	(Republic of Ireland) Joe O'Mahoney
Shamrock Rovers	Milltown, Dublin	Glenmalure Park	(Northern Ireland) Jim McLaughlin
Shelbourne	Harold's Cross	Harold's Cross Stadium	(Republic of Ireland) Paddy Mulligan
St Patrick's Athletic	Inchicore	Richmond Park	(Republic of Ireland) Jimmy Jackson
Waterford United	Waterford	Kilcohan Park	(Republic of Ireland) Alfie Hale
University College Dublin	Belfield	UCD Bowl	(Republic of Ireland) Theo Dunne

== Final Table ==
Pos	Team	Pld	W	D	L	GF	GA	GD	Pts	Qualification or relegation
1	Shamrock Rovers (C)	22	15	3	4	44	17	+27	33	Qualification to 1986–87 European Cup
2	Galway United	22	12	7	3	42	19	+23	31	Qualification to 1986–87 UEFA Cup
3	Dundalk	22	12	6	4	35	16	+19	30	
4	Bohemians	22	8	11	3	27	22	+5	27	
5	Waterford United	22	8	10	4	27	25	+2	26	Qualification to 1986–87 European Cup Winners' Cup (Note: Waterford United qualified for the 1986-87 European Cup Winners' Cup after reaching the 1985–86 FAI Cup final.)
6	St Patrick's Athletic	22	8	9	5	23	19	+4	25	
7	Limerick City	22	10	4	8	45	28	+17	24	
8	Athlone Town	22	6	7	9	23	27	−4	19	
9	Home Farm	22	5	5	12	15	30	−15	15	
10	Cork City	22	3	7	12	23	44	−21	13	
11	Shelbourne (R)	22	3	7	12	15	40	−25	13	Relegation to League of Ireland First Division
12	UCD (R)	22	2	4	16	19	51	−32	8	Relegation to League of Ireland First Division

Source: www.rsssf.com
(C) Champions; (R) Relegated

== Results ==
Home \ Away	ATH	BOH	COR	DUN	GAL	HOM	LIM	SHM	SHE	StP	UCD	WAT
Athlone Town	—	1–2	1–1	0–0	0–0	0–2	4–0	2–3	1–0	0–0	1–1	2–0
Bohemians	1–0	—	0–2	0–0	2–2	1–0	3–1	1–1	2–2	1–1	2–0	1–1
Cork City	0–2	1–2	—	1–4	0–2	1–1	1–4	0–3	0–1	2–2	1–2	1–1
Dundalk	3–2	0–0	2–2	—	2–1	0–1	2–1	1–0	1–0	0–1	3–0	0–0
Galway United	2–0	0–2	3–1	1–1	—	3–0	3–0	1–3	6–1	2–1	3–0	2–0
Home Farm	2–2	0–1	0–1	0–3	0–1	—	1–3	2–3	1–0	0–0	1–0	0–0
Limerick	0–1	0–0	5–2	1–2	1–1	4–1	—	3–1	5–0	1–1	3–0	1–1
Shamrock Rovers	5–1	3–0	4–0	1–0	2–2	4–0	1–0	—	1–0	0–1	1–0	1–0
Shelbourne	0–0	1–1	0–2	0–3	0–3	0–0	0–4	1–1	—	0–0	5–3	0–2
St Patrick's Athletic	0–1	2–1	2–1	1–0	0–0	2–0	1–3	0–2	1–1	—	2–0	2–2
UCD	2–0	3–3	2–2	1–2	1–2	0–3	0–4	1–4	0–2	1–3	—	1–1
Waterford United	3–2	1–1	1–1	2–5	2–2	1–0	2–1	1–0	3–1	1–0	2–1	—

Legend: Blue = home team win; Yellow = draw; Red = away team win.

== Top scorers ==
Rank	Player	Club	Goals
1	Tommy Gaynor	Limerick City	15
2	Paul McGee	Galway United	13
3	Colm McGonigle	Galway United	11
3	Pat Morley	Limerick City	11
3	Paul Doolin	Shamrock Rovers	11
6	Eugene Davis	Bohemians	8
6	Martin Reid	Waterford United	8
6	Dessie Gorman	Dundalk	8
9	Mick Byrne	Shamrock Rovers	7
9	Paddy Hughes	Cork City	7

== League of Ireland clubs in Europe ==
=== European Cup ===
==== First round ====
After winning the league title in the previous season, Shamrock Rovers received automatic qualification into the first round of the European Cup. Shamrock Rovers were drawn against Hungarian club, Budapest Honvéd, 1984-85 Hungarian League Winners. Budapest Honvéd were the hosts for the first leg and won the game comfortably in a 2-0 defeat of Shamrock Rovers. In the return leg, Shamrock Rovers were defeated once again 3-1, thus eliminating them from the competition.

Team 1	Agg.	Team 2	1st leg	2nd leg
Budapest Honvéd (Hungary)	5-1	(Republic of Ireland) Shamrock Rovers	2 - 0	3 - 1

===== First leg =====
18 September 1985	Budapest Honvéd (Hungary)	2 – 0	(Republic of Ireland) Shamrock Rovers	Illovszky Rudolf Stadion (1960), Budapest
	Dajka 36'; Détári 67'	Report

===== Second leg =====
2 October 1985	Shamrock Rovers (Republic of Ireland)	1 – 3	(Hungary) Budapest Honvéd	Glenmalure Park, Dublin
	Coady 84'	Report	Détári 69', 74'; Cseh 85'

Budapest Honvéd won 5–1 on aggregate.

=== UEFA Cup ===
==== First round ====
Team 1	Agg.	Team 2	1st leg	2nd leg
Bohemians (Republic of Ireland)	4-7	(Scotland) Dundee United	2 - 5	2 - 2

=== First round ===
FAI Cup Runners-up, Galway United entered the European Cup Winners' Cup in the first round against Danish side, Lyngby BK. Galway United were defeated 1-0 in the away leg in Lyngby BK. In the second leg, United were defeated 3-2 at Terryland Park, ending their European campaign.

Team 1	Agg.	Team 2	1st leg	2nd leg
Lyngby BK (Denmark)	4-2	(Republic of Ireland) Galway United	1 - 0	3 - 2

== See also ==
- 1985–86 League of Ireland First Division
