= 1992–93 League of Ireland Premier Division =

League of Ireland Premier Division
- Season: 1992–93
- Champions: Cork City (1st title)
- Relegated: Waterford United; Sligo Rovers; Bray Wanderers
- European Cup: Cork City
- UEFA Cup: Bohemians
- UEFA Cup Winners' Cup: Shelbourne
- Top goalscorer: Pat Morley: 20 (Cork City)

The 1992–93 League of Ireland Premier Division was the 8th season of the League of Ireland Premier Division. The division was made up of 12 teams. With a team that included Phil Harrington, John Caulfield, Pat Morley, Paul Bannon, Gerry McCabe and Dave Barry, manager Noel O'Mahony guided Cork City to their first Premier Division title after a series of three-way play-offs that also involved Bohemians and Shelbourne.

== Regular season ==
The regular season initially saw the 12 teams use a traditional round-robin format with each team playing 22 games on a home and away basis. The division was then split into two groups, a top six and a bottom six. After the split, the six teams played the other teams in their group in a second series of 10 games again using a round-robin format. On the last day of the regular season, Bohemians only needed to draw away to Dundalk to secure the title as they had a two-point advantage over both Shelbourne and Cork City. However Bohemians lost 1–0. Earlier in the day Shelbourne had defeated Derry City 1–0 with a goal in the last minute by Paul Doolin and Cork City beat Limerick 3–0. As a result, all three teams finished level on 40 points. Bohemians actually finished the season with the best goal difference, but at the time League of Ireland rules stated that the title could not be won on goal difference and a play-off would be required.

=== Final table ===
Pos	Team	Pld	W	D	L	GF	GA	GD	Pts	Qualification or relegation
1	Bohemians	32	13	14	5	46	19	+27	40	Qualification to Championship play-offs
2	Shelbourne	32	15	10	7	53	29	+24	40	Qualification to Championship play-offs
3	Cork City	32	16	8	8	47	34	+13	40	Qualification to Championship play-offs
4	Dundalk	32	13	13	6	35	28	+7	39	
5	Derry City	32	11	15	6	26	23	+3	37	
6	Limerick	32	6	15	11	27	31	−4	27	
7	St Patrick's Athletic	32	7	16	9	27	27	0	30	
8	Shamrock Rovers	32	8	12	12	39	35	+4	28	
9	Drogheda United	32	7	13	12	29	41	−12	27	
10	Waterford United (R)	32	10	7	15	34	59	−25	27	Qualification to Relegation play-off
11	Sligo Rovers (R)	32	6	14	12	16	32	−16	26	Relegation to League of Ireland First Division
12	Bray Wanderers (R)	32	5	13	14	19	40	−21	23	Relegation to League of Ireland First Division

Source: www.rsssf.com
(R) Relegated

=== Results ===
==== Matches 1–22 ====
Home \ Away	BOH	BRW	COR	DER	DRO	DUN	LIM	SHM	SHE	SLI	StP	WAT
Bohemians	—	2–0	0–2	0–0	2–0	1–1	1–1	2–1	1–1	4–0	0–0	6–0
Bray Wanderers	0–4	—	1–1	1–2	1–1	1–1	0–2	0–5	0–1	2–0	1–1	1–1
Cork City	1–4	2–0	—	1–1	2–0	4–1	0–1	2–0	2–1	1–1	2–1	1–0
Derry City	0–2	0–0	0–1	—	3–1	1–0	1–1	1–0	0–0	0–0	1–0	1–0
Drogheda United	0–0	1–0	0–0	0–1	—	0–2	2–2	1–4	0–2	1–1	1–1	1–0
Dundalk	1–1	1–1	3–1	0–0	1–1	—	1–0	2–1	2–1	1–1	0–0	4–0
Limerick	0–0	0–0	1–1	0–0	2–3	0–1	—	0–0	1–1	1–0	2–0	2–2
Shamrock Rovers	0–1	6–1	2–3	1–2	0–0	0–1	1–4	—	2–2	0–0	1–1	4–0
Shelbourne	1–4	1–0	6–2	1–2	3–2	4–1	3–1	1–1	—	4–0	1–1	6–0
Sligo Rovers	1–1	1–0	0–3	0–0	0–0	1–1	1–0	0–1	0–1	—	1–0	1–2
St Patrick's Athletic	1–1	1–1	2–1	1–1	2–2	0–0	0–0	1–0	0–0	2–0	—	2–1
Waterford United	1–0	1–2	0–3	2–0	3–3	5–4	0–3	2–3	2–1	0–1	0–2	—

Legend: Blue = home team win; Yellow = draw; Red = away team win.

==== Matches 23–32 ====
===== Top Six =====
Home \ Away	COR	BOH	DER	DUN	LIM	SHE
Cork City	—	2–0	1–1	1–1	1–0	0–1
Bohemians	1–1	—	1–2	2–1	3–0	2–0
Derry City	0–0	2–0	—	1–0	1–1	0–1
Dundalk	2–1	1–1	0–2	—	1–1	1–0
Limerick	0–2	0–1	0–2	1–1	—	0–1
Shelbourne	1–0	0–0	1–0	1–1	0–0	—

Legend: Blue = home team win; Yellow = draw; Red = away team win.

===== Bottom Six =====
Home \ Away	BRW	DRO	SHM	SLI	StP	WAT
Bray Wanderers	—	1–0	1–2	2–0	0–0	0–1
Drogheda United	0–1	—	0–0	1–0	2–0	1–2
Shamrock Rovers	1–0	0–3	—	0–0	1–0	0–0
Sligo Rovers	0–0	1–1	0–0	—	3–1	1–1
St Patrick's Athletic	0–0	0–1	2–1	0–1	—	4–0
Waterford United	1–0	4–0	1–1	1–0	1–1	—

Legend: Blue = home team win; Yellow = draw; Red = away team win.

== Promotion/relegation play-off ==
This season saw the introduction of a promotion/relegation play-off. Waterford United F.C. who finished in tenth place played off against Monaghan United F.C., the third placed team from the 1992–93 League of Ireland First Division.

=== 1st leg ===
18 April 1993	Waterford United F.C.	2–2	Monaghan United F.C.

=== 2nd leg ===
25 April 1993	Monaghan United F.C.	3–0	Waterford United F.C.

Monaghan United F.C. won 5–2 on aggregate and are promoted to Premier Division

== Championship play-offs ==
=== First series ===
In the round-robin three way play-off, Cork City beat Bohemians at home, Bohemians beat Shelbourne at home and Shelbourne beat Cork City at home. The return fixtures were all drawn. Once again all three teams finished level on points and a second series of play-offs would be required.

17 April

Cork City	1 – 0	Bohemians

Bishopstown Stadium

25 April

Shelbourne	1 – 0	Cork City

Tolka Park

29 April

Bohemians	2 – 1	Shelbourne

Dalymount Park

2 May

Cork City	1 – 1	Shelbourne

Bishopstown Stadium

5 May

Bohemians	0 – 0	Cork City

Dalymount Park

8 May

Shelbourne	0 – 0	Bohemians

Tolka Park

==== First series table ====
Pos	Team	Pld	W	D	L	GF	GA	GD	Pts
1	Shelbourne	4	1	2	1	3	3	0	4
2	Bohemians	4	1	2	1	2	2	0	4
3	Cork City	4	1	2	1	2	2	0	4

Source: www.rsssf.com

=== Second series ===
The second series of play-offs saw the three teams playing each other once at neutral venues. During the break between the first and second series of play-offs, Shelbourne won the 1992–93 FAI Cup final and as a result qualified for 1993–94 European Cup Winners' Cup. Cork City clinched the title after defeating Shelbourne 3–2 in the deciding game at the RDS Arena.

19 May

Cork City	1 – 0	Bohemians

Turners Cross

22 May

Shelbourne	2 – 3	Cork City
Haylock 44' pen Whelan 64'		Morley 23'; Barry 54'; Bannon 74'

RDS Arena
Referee: Michael Caulfield

27 May

Bohemians	2 – 1	Shelbourne

RDS Arena

==== Second series table ====
Pos	Team	Pld	W	D	L	GF	GA	GD	Pts	Qualification or relegation
1	Cork City (C)	2	2	0	0	4	2	+2	4	Qualification to Champions League preliminary round
2	Bohemians	2	1	0	1	2	2	0	2	Qualification to UEFA Cup first round
3	Shelbourne	2	0	0	2	2	4	−2	0	Qualification to Cup Winners' Cup qualifying round (Note: Shelbourne qualified for the Cup Winners' Cup qualifying round after winning the 1992–93 FAI Cup final.)

Source: www.rsssf.com
(C) Champions

== See also ==
- 1992–93 League of Ireland First Division
