= 1985 FAI Cup final =

- Event: 1984–85 FAI Cup
Shamrock Rovers	Galway United
1	0
- Date: 28 April 1985
- Venue: Dalymount Park, Dublin
- Attendance: 7,000

The 1985 FAI Cup final was the final match of the 1984–85 FAI Cup, a knockout association football competition contested annually by clubs affiliated with the Football Association of Ireland. It took place on Sunday 28 April 1985 at Dalymount Park in Dublin, and was contested by Shamrock Rovers and Galway United. Rovers won the match 1–0, winning the cup for the 22nd time and in the process winning the double.

== Background ==
Shamrock Rovers had lost the previous years' final 2–1 to UCD after a replay. For Galway United it was their first-ever time reaching the FAI Cup final having only joined the League of Ireland 8 years earlier. That season, Rovers won both encounters between the sides 1–0 in the league in a season where they won the league, and Galway finished the season in 6th.

=== Route to the final ===
Shamrock Rovers		Round	Galway United	
Opponent	Score	Round	Opponent	Score
Bohemians	0–0 (A)	First round	Avondale United	4–0 (A)
Bohemians	0–0 (H)	Replay	-	
Bohemians	1–0 (H)	2nd Replay	-	
Drogheda United	3–2 (A)	Quarter-finals	Shelbourne	0–0 (A)
-		Replay	Shelbourne	4–1 (H)
Athlone Town	2–1 (H)	Semi-finals	Limerick City	2–2 (A)
-		Replay	Limerick City	1–0 (H)
Note: In all results above, the score of the finalist is given first (H: home; A: away).

== Match ==
=== Details ===
28 April 1985

Shamrock Rovers	1–0	Galway United
Noel Larkin 57'

Dalymount Park, Dublin
Attendance: 7,000

GK	(Republic of Ireland) Jody Byrne
DF	(Republic of Ireland) Jacko McDonagh
DF	(Republic of Ireland) Kevin Brady
DF	(Republic of Ireland) Dermot Keely
DF	(Republic of Ireland) Mick Neville
DF	(Republic of Ireland) John Coady
MF	(Republic of Ireland) Noel King
MF	(Republic of Ireland) Liam O'Brien
MF	(Republic of Ireland) Pat Byrne
FW	(Republic of Ireland) Mick Byrne
FW	(Republic of Ireland) Noel Larkin
Manager:
(Northern Ireland) Jim McLaughlin

GK	(Republic of Ireland) Tom Lally
DF	(England) Brian Gardiner
DF	(Republic of Ireland) Denis Bonner
DF	(Republic of Ireland) Jimmy Nolan
DF	(Republic of Ireland) Kevin Cassidy
DF	(Republic of Ireland) Eamonn Deacy
MF	(Republic of Ireland) Gerry Daly
MF	(Northern Ireland) John Mannion
MF	(Northern Ireland) Martin McDonnell
FW	(Republic of Ireland) Paul Murphy
FW	(Republic of Ireland) Johnny Glynn	(substituted off) 76'
Substitutes:
MF	(Republic of Ireland) Noel Mernagh	(substituted on) 76'
Managers:
(Republic of Ireland) Tony Mannion & (Republic of Ireland) Tom Lally (Note: Lally was a player-manager)

== Aftermath ==
The winner of this match would receive a spot in the European Cup Winners' Cup, however Rovers qualified for the European Cup as a result of winning the league. As a result of this, the Cup Winners' Cup spot was given to the losing finalists, Galway United.

Shamrock Rovers would go on to win the cup again in 1986 and 1987. The same final would take place between Galway United and Shamrock Rovers in 1991 at Lansdowne Road, on that occasion Galway came out as 1–0 winners.

== See also ==
- 1991 FAI Cup final – contested by same teams
