= 2011 League of Ireland First Division =

League of Ireland First Division
- Season: 2011
- Champions: Cork City
- Promoted: Shelbourne; Monaghan United
- Matches: 165
- Goals: 457 (2.77 per match)
- Top goalscorer: Graham Cummins: 24 (Cork City)
- Biggest home win: Limerick 6–0 Wexford Youths
- Biggest away win: Athlone Town 0–7 Cork City
- Highest scoring: Wexford Youths 3–5 Mervue United

The 2011 League of Ireland First Division season was the 27th season of the League of Ireland First Division. The First Division was contested by 11 teams and Cork City won the title.

== Teams ==
2011 League of Ireland First Division teams

Team	Base	Stadium
Athlone Town	Athlone	Athlone Town Stadium
Cork City	Cork	Turner's Cross
Finn Harps	Ballybofey	Finn Park
Limerick	Limerick	Jackman Park
Longford Town	Longford	Flancare Park
Mervue United	Galway	Fahy's Field
Monaghan United	Monaghan	Kingspan Century Park
Salthill Devon	Salthill	Drom Soccer Park
Shelbourne	Drumcondra	Tolka Park
Waterford United	Waterford	Waterford RSC
Wexford Youths	Crossabeg	Ferrycarraig Park

== Overview ==
This season the division featured 11 clubs. This was because Sporting Fingal withdrew from the Premier Division shortly before the season was due to start. Drogheda United, who were originally due to play in the 2011 First Division after being relegated from the 2010 Premier Division, were drafted in to replace Sporting Fingal in the top division. Each team played the other teams three times, totaling 30 games. Cork City finished as champions and were automatically promoted to the Premier Division. Runners up Shelbourne were also promoted, as were third placed Monaghan United after winning a play-off.

== Final table ==
Pos	Team	Pld	W	D	L	GF	GA	GD	Pts	Qualification or relegation
1	Cork City (C, P)	30	20	9	1	73	26	+47	69	Promoted to Premier Division
2	Shelbourne (P)	30	22	2	6	62	24	+38	68	Promoted to Premier Division
3	Monaghan United (P)	30	21	4	5	60	27	+33	67	Promoted to Premier Division after play-off
4	Limerick	30	20	6	4	49	22	+27	66	
5	Waterford United	30	13	3	14	37	31	+6	42	
6	Longford Town	30	12	4	14	38	41	−3	40	
7	Mervue United	30	10	4	16	37	45	−8	34	
8	Athlone Town	30	9	5	16	25	53	−28	32	
9	Finn Harps	30	8	4	18	29	45	−16	28	
10	Wexford Youths	30	4	2	24	29	69	−40	14	
11	Salthill Devon	30	2	5	23	18	74	−56	11	

Rules for classification: 1) points; 2) goal difference; 3) number of goals scored.
(C) Champions; (P) Promoted

== Results ==
=== Matches 1–20 ===
Home \ Away	ATH	COR	FHA	LIM	LON	MER	MON	SAL	SHE	WAT	WEX
Athlone Town		0–0	1–0	0–1	1–1	1–0	0–3	2–0	0–4	0–3	2–0
Cork City	2–0		5–0	1–0	1–1	3–0	2–2	1–0	4–1	2–3	1–0
Finn Harps	1–0	0–2		2–2	1–2	2–0	2–2	0–0	0–3	1–0	0–1
Limerick	3–0	0–0	1–0		1–0	2–0	0–2	3–0	0–3	1–0	0–1
Longford Town	2–0	1–3	3–2	1–2		2–1	1–3	2–0	1–2	1–0	2–1
Mervue United	1–2	1–1	2–1	0–2	2–1		3–1	0–0	1–2	1–1	3–0
Monaghan United	1–0	1–1	1–0	1–1	1–0	1–2		3–0	0–1	2–0	2–1
Salthill Devon	1–1	1–5	0–4	0–1	0–1	1–2	2–5		0–1	0–2	2–1
Shelbourne	2–0	1–1	1–0	1–1	1–0	4–0	2–3	4–1		2–1	4–2
Waterford United	0–0	1–2	1–0	1–2	1–0	1–0	0–1	4–0	0–1		0–1
Wexford Youths	0–1	1–2	0–2	2–3	0–2	3–5	1–2	1–3	0–1	1–2	

Source: www.rsssf.com
Legend: Blue = home team win; Yellow = draw; Red = away team win.

=== Matches 21–30 ===
Home \ Away	ATH	COR	FHA	LIM	LON	MER	MON	SAL	SHE	WAT	WEX
Athlone Town		0–7	0–1			4–1	0–5		0–2		
Cork City			5–2	3–3	3–1		3–1				2–2
Finn Harps				1–2	1–2		0–3	2–0			4–1
Limerick	3–1				1–0			1–1		3–0	6–0
Longford Town	0–2					2–2		1–1	1–3	2–1	
Mervue United		1–2	1–0	0–1			0–1		0–2		
Monaghan United				0–1	3–2			3–0		3–1	2–0
Salthill Devon	1–3	0–4				0–5			1–4	1–3	
Shelbourne		1–2	4–0	1–2			1–2				3–0
Waterford United	5–1	1–3	0–0			2–0			1–0		
Wexford Youths	3–3				1–3	0–3		5–2		0–2	

Source: www.rsssf.com
Legend: Blue = home team win; Yellow = draw; Red = away team win.

== Promotion/relegation play-off ==
Galway United, the tenth-placed team in the 2011 Premier Division, and Monaghan United, the third-placed team of the First Division, played off to see who would play in the 2012 Premier Division. The playoff was contested in a two-legged format.

1 November 2011	Monaghan United	2 – 0	Galway United	Kingspan Century Park
19.45 GMT	Isichei 13'; S. Brennan 87'

4 November 2011	Galway United	1 – 3	Monaghan United	Terryland Park
19.45 GMT	Murphy 82'		26', 33' O'Brien; 51' R. Brennan

Monaghan United won 5–1 on aggregate and were promoted to the Premier Division. Galway United were relegated to the First Division.

== Awards ==
=== Top Goalscorers ===
Scorer	Club	Goals
(Republic of Ireland) Graham Cummins	Cork City	24
(Republic of Ireland) Philip Hughes	Shelbourne	20
(Republic of Ireland) David Cassidy	Shelbourne	15
(Republic of Ireland) Sean Brennan	Monaghan United	14
(Republic of Ireland) Conan Byrne	Shelbourne	13

=== Player of the Year ===
Winner	Club
(Republic of Ireland) Graham Cummins	Cork City

== See also ==
- 2011 League of Ireland Premier Division
- 2011 League of Ireland Cup
- 2011 A Championship
- 2011 Dundalk F.C. season
- 2011 Shamrock Rovers F.C. season
