= 1987 League of Ireland Cup final =

- Event: 1986–87 League of Ireland Cup
Dundalk	Shamrock Rovers
1	0
- Date: 1 January 1987
- Venue: Dalymount Park, Dublin
- Referee: Pat Kelly

The 1987 League of Ireland Cup final was the final match of the 1986–87 League of Ireland Cup (called the Opel League Cup for sponsorship purposes), a knock-out association football competition contested annually by clubs affiliated with the League of Ireland. It took place on 1 January 1987 at Dalymount Park in Dublin, and was contested by Dundalk and Shamrock Rovers. Dundalk won 1–0 to win the competition for the third time.

== Background ==
The League Cup was the first trophy of the 1986–87 League of Ireland season. Its first round, in which four teams played each other in a double round-robin system, took place before the start of the league schedule. The two sides had met twice already that season, with Shamrock Rovers winning both the President's Cup final and the league fixture in Milltown. Dundalk had last won the competition in 1981. They reached the final by topping their group over Cork City, Drogheda United and EMFA, and then defeating St Patrick's Athletic (in a penalty shoot-out after a 0–0 draw) and Athlone Town (1–0).

Shamrock Rovers had won the League Cup once previously, in 1976–77, and had lost on their two previous appearances in the final. In the 1986–87 season they would go on to win a League and FAI Cup Double, with Dundalk finishing as runners-up in both competitions.

== Match ==
=== Summary ===
Both sides went into the match with much-changed sides due to a number of injury problems. Dundalk had three players making debuts, including local-league player Paul Matthews who was signed as cover on New Year's Eve; while manager Turlough O'Connor, was obliged to be listed as '13th player' on the team-sheets. Dundalk's Dessie Gorman missed two early chances before they were awarded a controversial penalty in the 39th minute, when Noel Larkin was adjudged to have fouled Tom McNulty near the goal-line in a tussle for possession. Martin Murray scored the resultant spot-kick, despite it being weakly struck. In a match described as "disappointing" in press reports, both sides failed subsequently to create any real chances, with Martin Lawlor and Harry McCue performing well at the centre of a makeshift Dundalk defence, and new Rovers player-manager, Dermot Keely (a former Dundalk stalwart) dominating at the back for his side. Dundalk goalkeeper, Alan O'Neill, was forced into making two late saves as they held out. The win was Turlough O'Connor's first trophy as Dundalk manager, and the club's first since 1981–82.

=== Details ===
1 January 1987
15:00

Dundalk	1–0	Shamrock Rovers
Martin Murray 39' (pen.)	Report

Dalymount Park
Attendance: unreported
Referee: Pat Kelly

Dundalk	Shamrock Rovers

GK	(Republic of Ireland) Alan O'Neill
DF	(Republic of Ireland) Harry McCue
DF	(Republic of Ireland) Joey Malone (c)
DF	(Republic of Ireland) Derek Carroll
DF	(Republic of Ireland) Martin Lawlor
MF	(Republic of Ireland) Tony Devereux
MF	(Republic of Ireland) Martin Murray
MF	(Republic of Ireland) Larry Wyse
MF	(Scotland) Tom McNulty
FW	(Northern Ireland) Paul Matthews	(substituted off) 70'
FW	(Republic of Ireland) Dessie Gorman
Substitutes:
MF	(Republic of Ireland) Francis Callan	(substituted on) 70'
Manager:
(Republic of Ireland) Turlough O'Connor

GK	(Republic of Ireland) Jody Byrne
DF	(Republic of Ireland) Harry Kenny
DF	(Republic of Ireland) Dermot Keely
DF	(Republic of Ireland) Noel Larkin
MF	(Republic of Ireland) Martin Nolan
MF	(Republic of Ireland) John Glynn
MF	(Republic of Ireland) Mick Neville
MF	(Republic of Ireland) Pat Byrne
MF	(Republic of Ireland) Paul Doolin
FW	(Republic of Ireland) Brendan Murphy
FW	(Republic of Ireland) Mick Byrne
Manager:
(Republic of Ireland) Dermot Keely
