= 1985–86 League of Ireland First Division =

League of Ireland First Division
- Season: 1985–86
- Champions: Bray Wanderers
- Promoted: Sligo Rovers
- Top goalscorer: Con McLoughlin: 11 (Finn Harps); Harry McLoughlin: 11 (Sligo Rovers)

The 1985–86 League of Ireland First Division season was the first season of the League of Ireland First Division. The inaugural First Division featured ten teams. Bray Wanderers won the title.

== Overview ==
In 1985 five teams – Bray Wanderers, Cobh Ramblers, Derry City, Emfa and Newcastle United – were elected to join the League of Ireland. All five subsequently participated in the inaugural 1985–86 First Division season, along with Monaghan United from the League of Ireland B Division and four clubs – Drogheda United, Finn Harps, Longford Town and Sligo Rovers – who were relegated following the 1984–85 League of Ireland season. There were five unsuccessful applicants for inclusion in the expanded league: three attempted revivals of defunct clubs (Cork Hibernians, Limerick United, and Thurles Town) and two more from County Donegal (Gweedore Celtic of Gweedore and Swilly Rovers of Ramelton).

Bray Wanderers were the inaugural First Division champions.

== Final table ==
Pos	Team	Pld	W	D	L	GF	GA	GD	Pts	Promotion
1	Bray Wanderers (C)	18	11	6	1	30	10	+20	28	Promotion to the Premier Division
2	Sligo Rovers	18	11	5	2	32	13	+19	27	Promotion to the Premier Division
3	Longford Town	18	10	5	3	29	23	+6	25	
4	Derry City	18	8	6	4	31	18	+13	22	
5	Drogheda United	18	5	8	5	20	18	+2	18	
6	Cobh Ramblers	18	5	5	8	14	25	−11	15	
7	Finn Harps	18	3	7	8	23	31	−8	13	
8	Newcastle United (Note: Newcastle United F.C. changed their club name to Newcastlewest F.C. for the 1986–87 season.)	18	5	3	10	21	33	−12	13	
9	Monaghan United	18	4	3	11	19	32	−13	11	
10	E.M.F.A.	18	1	6	11	21	37	−16	8	

(C) Champions

== See also ==
- 1985–86 League of Ireland Premier Division
