= Martin Murray (footballer) =

Irish footballer (born 1958)

Personal information
- Full name: Martin Patrick Murray
- Date of birth: 6 October 1958 (age 68)
- Place of birth: Dublin, Ireland
- Position: Midfielder

Senior career*
Years	Team	Apps	(Gls)
1974–1975	Home Farm	20	(2)
1975–1980	Everton	0	(0)
1978	→ Home Farm (loan)	14	(4)
1980	Home Farm	0	(0)
1980–1984	Drogheda United	76	(25)
1984–1990	Dundalk	147	(18)
1990–1991	Ashtown Villa		
1991	St Pat's Athletic	11	(0)
1991–1998	Crusaders	160	(11)
Total		448	(60)

International career
1976–1977	Republic of Ireland U18	2	(0)
1978–1979	Republic of Ireland U21	8	(3)

Managerial career
- 1998–1999: Crusaders (assistant)
- 1999–2000: Crusaders
- 2000–2002: Dundalk
- * Club domestic league appearances and goals

Martin Patrick Murray (born 6 October 1958) is an Irish retired football player and manager. His playing career spanned over 20 years, despite being diagnosed with a faulty heart valve at the age of 19. At club level he played for Home Farm, Everton, Drogheda United, Dundalk, St Pat's Athletic and Crusaders, winning multiple honours, as well as representing the Republic of Ireland up to under-21 level. He later managed Crusaders and Dundalk, winning the FAI Cup with the latter.

== Playing career ==
=== Club career ===
Murray began his career with Home Farm in his native Dublin, making his debut as a 16 year old. He was still 16 when he helped Home Farm to win the 1975 FAI Cup, defeating Shelbourne in the final. He then signed for Everton and was hailed as "The New George Best", playing in the FA Youth Cup final defeat to Crystal Palace. However during a loan spell back at Home Farm in 1978, he collapsed and was diagnosed with a faulty heart valve, and the following year, while back at Everton, he ruptured his cruciate ligament in a reserve match against Leeds United.

After a short spell back with Home Farm, Murray signed for Drogheda United. He was involved in the club's first every foray into European football, playing against Tottenham Hotspur in the UEFA Cup. He also won the League of Ireland Cup with the side, but his time there ended on unfortunate note when a car accident ruled him out of the final few weeks of his final season with the Drogs.

In 1984, Murray moved to Dundalk, the club with which he would be most successful in the League of Ireland. He made his debut in a friendly against Celtic, and would go on to make 218 appearances for the club, scoring 29 goals. In the 1986–87 season he finished as Dundalk's top scorer with 13 goals. He then won the League of Ireland and FAI Cup the following season, and after several more successful seasons and outings against European giants such as AFC Ajax and Red Star Belgrade, Murray dropped into semi-professional football with Ashtown Villa. However after a short spell he returned to full-time football with St Patrick's Athletic in January 1991 for the remainder of the season.

Murray moved to Crusaders in 1991, becoming one of many southern-based players to represent the club during that time period. He had seven successful years with the club, winning two League of Ireland championships, the Irish League Cup, Gold Cup, Ulster Cup and County Antrim Shield. He made 265 appearances for the club, scoring 18 goals.

After 614 games and 96 goals, Murray finally retired in the summer of 1998 on medical advice, and had heart surgery to repair his heart valve.

=== International career ===
Murray represented the Republic of Ireland at under-18 and under-21 level. He scored 3 goals at for the under-21 side against Northern Ireland, Mexico and Yugoslavia.

== Managerial career ==
After retiring as a player, Murray stayed with Crusaders as assistant manager to Aaron Callaghan. For the 1999–2000 season he took over as manager, leading the side to a 7th-placed finish. However, lack of funds at Seaview were a source of frustration to Murray.

While driving up to Belfast for a pre-season meeting, he heard of the managerial vacancy at Dundalk and applied for the job, being appointed in time for the 2000–01 League of Ireland First Division season, in which he led the Lilywhites to the title and promotion to the Premier Division. They were relegated in the 2001–02 season, as the league was reduced from 12 teams to 10, although Murray did lead Dundalk to the club's ninth FAI Cup win one week after their relegation, defeating Bohemians 2–1 in the final. This was Murray's last match as a manager.

== Honours ==
=== Player ===
Home Farm

- FAI Cup: 1974–75

Drogheda United

- League of Ireland Cup: 1983–84

Dundalk

- League of Ireland Premier Division: 1987–88
- FAI Cup: 1987–88
- League of Ireland Cup: 1986–87, 1989–90

Crusaders

- Irish League: 1994–95, 1996–97
- Irish League Cup: 1996–97
- Gold Cup: 1995–96
- Ulster Cup: 1993–94
- County Antrim Shield: 1991–92

=== Manager ===
Dundalk

- FAI Cup: 2001–02
- League of Ireland First Division: 2000–01
