= 1992–93 League of Ireland First Division =

League of Ireland First Division
- Season: 1992–93
- Champions: Galway United
- Promoted: Cobh Ramblers; Monaghan United
- Top goalscorer: Mick Byrne: 15 (Monaghan United); Richie Parsons (Longford Town): 15

The 1992–93 League of Ireland First Division season was the 8th season of the League of Ireland First Division.

== Overview ==
The First Division was contested by 10 teams and Galway United F.C. won the division. This season saw the introduction of a promotion/relegation play-off. Third placed Monaghan United F.C. played off against Waterford United F.C. who finished in tenth place in the 1992–93 League of Ireland Premier Division. The winner would compete in the 1993–94 League of Ireland Premier Division.

== Final table ==
Pos	Team	Pld	W	D	L	GF	GA	GD	Pts	Promotion or qualification
1	Galway United F.C.	27	16	6	5	56	27	+29	38	Promoted to Premier Division
2	Cobh Ramblers F.C.	27	10	12	5	33	23	+10	32	Promoted to Premier Division
3	Monaghan United F.C.	27	11	10	6	38	31	+7	32	Promoted to Premier Division after play-off
4	University College Dublin A.F.C.	27	10	10	7	36	26	+10	30	
5	Longford Town F.C.	27	10	9	8	41	39	+2	29	
6	Athlone Town A.F.C.	27	8	9	10	33	34	−1	25	
7	Finn Harps F.C.	27	8	9	10	34	40	−6	25	
8	Home Farm F.C.	27	6	10	11	28	29	−1	22	
9	Kilkenny City A.F.C.	27	5	11	11	27	43	−16	21	
10	St James's Gate F.C.	27	4	8	15	16	50	−34	16	

== Promotion/relegation play-off ==
=== 1st leg ===
18 April 1993	Waterford United F.C.	2–2	Monaghan United F.C.

=== 2nd leg ===
25 April 1993	Monaghan United F.C.	3–0	Waterford United F.C.

Monaghan United F.C. won 5–3 on aggregate and are promoted to Premier Division

== See also ==
- 1992–93 League of Ireland Premier Division
