= Noel O'Mahony =

Irish footballer (1939–2013)

Personal information
- Date of birth: 18 December 1939
- Date of death: 30 May 2013 (aged 73)
- Position: Defender

Youth career
- Ballyphenane United
- Tramore Athletic

Senior career*
Years	Team	Apps	(Gls)
196x–1976	Cork Hibernians		
1976–1977	Albert Rovers		

Managerial career
- 1976–1977: Albert Rovers
- 1977–1978: → Cork Albert
- 1979–1980: → Cork Alberts
- 1980–1982: → Cork United
- 1983: Limerick
- 1985–1986: Newcastle West
- 1986: Cork City
- 1988–1992: Cork City
- 1993–1994: Cork City
- * Club domestic league appearances and goals

Noel O'Mahony (18 December 1939 – 30 May 2013) was a League of Ireland football player and manager. As a player, he won the 1970–71 League of Ireland title with Cork Hibernians and as manager he won the 1992–93 League of Ireland Premier Division with Cork City.

== Family and early years ==
O'Mahony was the son of Nora and Timothy O'Mahony and he grew up on Pearse Road in the Ballyphehane district of Cork. Two of his brothers were also League of Ireland footballers. Like Noel, Declan also played for Cork Hibernians while Pat played for Cork Celtic. Noel and Pat O'Mahony both attended Coláiste Chríost Rí where Noel initially played Gaelic football before switching to association football. As a schoolboy he played for Ballyphenane United and Tramore Athletic. Pat O'Mahony also played for Athletic. In 1956 Noel O'Mahony was selected as the inaugural Cork Schoolboy Player of the Year.

== Playing career ==
=== Cork Hibernians ===
During the 1960s and 1970s O'Mahony played for Cork Hibernians. Together with Miah Dennehy, John Herrick, Gerry Coyne and Dinny Allen, he was a prominent member of a successful Hibernians team managed by Dave Bacuzzi. He was invariably described as a "hard player", a "(take) no prisoners... centre-half" and as a "tough, no-nonsense defender". While playing for Hibernians, O'Mahony helped the club win the 1970–71 League of Ireland title, two FAI Cups in 1971–72 and 1972–73 and the Blaxnit Cup in 1971–72. His brother Declan also played as a goalkeeper for Hibernians and featured in the 1972–73 FAI Cup final. O'Mahony also served as team captain and played for Hibernians in Europe, including in a 1970–71 Inter-Cities Fairs Cup tie against Valencia.

== Managerial career ==
=== Albert Rovers ===
At the end of the 1975–76 season, Cork Hibernians resigned from the League of Ireland. The 1976–77 season saw them replaced by Albert Rovers with O'Mahony serving as their player-manager. O'Mahony subsequently remained in charge of Albert Rovers for most of their stay in the League of Ireland under their various guises as Cork Albert, Cork Alberts and Cork United. The highlight of his time with Alberts was guiding the club to the 1977–78 League of Ireland Cup final which they lost to Dundalk.

=== Limerick ===
During the 1980s County Limerick had two clubs, Limerick and Newcastle West, playing in the League of Ireland for the first time and O'Mahony managed both clubs during the course of the decade. In 1983–84 he was briefly in charge during a turbulent time for Limerick as rival factions within the club went to the High Court to decide who owned the rights to the club's name. O'Mahony also served as manager of Newcastle West.

=== Cork City ===
During the 1980s and 1990s O'Mahony had three spells in charge of Cork City. He was briefly in charge in 1986 before he was succeeded by Eamon O'Keefe. He was reappointed for the 1988–89 season and O'Mahony subsequently guided the club to eighth place in the league. Cork City also reached the FAI Cup final but lost to Derry City. However, because Derry City were Premier Division champions, Cork City qualified for the 1989–90 European Cup Winners' Cup. This was the first time Cork City qualified for Europe. In 1990–91 after finishing second in the Premier Division, Cork City qualified for the 1991–92 UEFA Cup. In the first round they held Bayern Munich to a 1–1 draw at Musgrave Park before eventually losing the tie 3–1 on aggregate. In 1992–93, with a team that included Phil Harrington, John Caulfield, Pat Morley, Paul Bannon, Gerry McCabe and Dave Barry, O'Mahony guided Cork City to their first Premier Division title after a series of three-way play-offs that also involved Bohemians and Shelbourne. Damien Richardson briefly took over from O'Mahony at the start of the 1993–94 but O'Mahony was re-appointed manager before the season ended. O'Mahony then became the only manager to win the League of Ireland Cup without getting the team to the final.

== Death and legacy ==
O'Mahony died peacefully on 30 May 2013 at Cork University Hospital. He was survived by his wife Noreen, partner Ann, sisters and brothers. Two weeks prior to his death, he had attended a 20-year reunion of Cork City's 1992–93 Premier Division winning team. An obituary in the Irish Examiner remarked that O'Mahony had achieved success at three of Cork city's sports stadiums. As a player with Cork Hibernians he had played at Páirc Uí Rinn when it was known as Flower Lodge. As a manager of Cork City, he oversaw a draw with Bayern Munich at Musgrave Park and then won the Premier Division at Turners Cross.

== Honours ==
=== Player ===
Cork Hibernians

- League of Ireland: 1970–71
- FAI Cup: 1971–72, 1972–73
- Blaxnit Cup: 1971–72

=== Manager ===
Cork City

- League of Ireland Premier Division: 1992–93; runner-up 1990–91
- FAI Cup runner-up: 1988–89, 1991–92
- League of Ireland Cup: 1993–94

Cork Albert

- League of Ireland Cup runner-up: 1977–78
