= 1989 League of Ireland Cup final =

- Event: 1989–90 League of Ireland Cup
Dundalk	Derry City
1	1
- After extra time Dundalk won 4–1 on penalties
- Date: 9 November 1989
- Venue: Oriel Park, Dundalk
- Referee: G. Kelly

The 1989 League of Ireland Cup final was the final match of the 1989–90 League of Ireland Cup, known as the Opel League Cup for sponsorship purposes, a knock-out association football competition contested annually by clubs affiliated with the League of Ireland. It took place on 9 November 1989 at Oriel Park in Dundalk, and was contested by Dundalk and Derry City. Dundalk won 4–1 in a penalty shoot-out, following a 1–1 draw after extra-time.

== Background ==
The League Cup was the first trophy of the 1989–90 League of Ireland season. The two sides' only previous meeting that season had been a 1–1 draw in the League of Ireland Premier Division. The match was the third time the two sides had met in cup finals in 18 months - Dundalk having defeated Derry in the 1988 FAI Cup Final and Derry having defeated Dundalk in the previous season's League Cup Final. The latter match was the first part of Derry's domestic Treble of League, FAI Cup and League Cup, which they had won the season before – the only team to have done so.

Dundalk had last won the League Cup three seasons earlier in 1986–87. They had won their group in the group-stage, then defeated Athlone Town (3–2), and St Patrick's Athletic (3–1) to reach the 1989 final.

== Match ==
=== Summary ===
Dundalk started strongly, and were awarded a 10th-minute penalty. But Joey Malone's spot-kick was saved by Derry goalkeeper, Tim Dalton. Minutes later Derry's Paul Doolin was shown a straight red card by referee John Spillane, after a clash with Dundalk's James Coll. Spillane had also made a number of controversial decisions in Dundalk's defeat of Derry in the 1988 FAI Cup Final. Despite being a man down, Derry took a 36th-minute lead through Felix Healy. Dundalk equalised a minute before half-time when Paul Newe fired a loose ball from a corner to the net. The sides couldn't be separated in the second half or in extra-time, with Derry defending resolutely. But in the resulting penalty shoot-out Derry missed two spot-kicks, while Dundalk scored four to take the victory and the League Cup for the fourth time.

=== Details ===
9 November 1989
20:00

Dundalk	1–1 (a.e.t.)	Derry City
Paul Newe 44'	Report	Felix Healy 36'
Penalties
Martin Murray (penalty scored); Tony Cousins (penalty scored); Mick Shelley (penalty scored); Tom McNulty (penalty scored)	4–1	Jonathan Speak (penalty scored); Felix Healy (penalty missed); Alex Krstic (penalty missed)

Oriel Park, Dundalk
Referee: John Spillane (Cork)

Dundalk	Derry City

GK	(Republic of Ireland) Alan O'Neill
DF	(Republic of Ireland) James Coll
DF	(Republic of Ireland) Joey Malone (c)	(substituted off) 69'
DF	(Republic of Ireland) Gino Lawless
DF	(Republic of Ireland) Martin Lawlor
CM	(Republic of Ireland) Martin Murray
CM	(Republic of Ireland) Larry Wyse
CM	(Republic of Ireland) Mick Shelley
CM	(Scotland) Tom McNulty
CF	(Republic of Ireland) Tony Cousins
CF	(Republic of Ireland) Paul Newe
Substitutes:
DF	(Republic of Ireland) John Cleary	(substituted on) 69'
Manager:
(Republic of Ireland) Turlough O'Connor

GK	(Republic of Ireland) Tim Dalton
DF	(France) Pascal Vaudequin
DF	(Northern Ireland) Paul Curran
DF	(Republic of Ireland) Mick Neville
DF	(Republic of Ireland) Kevin Brady
RM	(Northern Ireland) Paul Carlyle
CM	(Northern Ireland) Felix Healy (c)
CM	(Republic of Ireland) Paul Doolin
LM	(Republic of Ireland) John Coady
CF	(Socialist Federal Republic of Yugoslavia) Aleksandar Krstić
CF	(Northern Ireland) Jonathan Speak
Substitutes:		N/A
Manager:
(Northern Ireland) Jim McLaughlin
