= 1981 League of Ireland Cup final =

- Event: 1980–81 League of Ireland Cup
Galway Rovers	Dundalk

First Leg
Galway Rovers	Dundalk
0	0
- Date: 1 January 1981
- Venue: Terryland Park, Galway
- Referee: Kevin O'Sullivan
- Attendance: £4,000 gate

Second Leg
Dundalk	Galway Rovers
0	0
- After extra time Dundalk won 3–2 on penalties
- Date: 8 January 1981
- Venue: Oriel Park, Dundalk
- Referee: Paddy Mulhall
- Attendance: unreported

The 1981 League of Ireland Cup final was the final match of the 1980–81 League of Ireland Cup, a knock-out association football competition played annually by clubs affiliated with the League of Ireland. It was contested by Dundalk and Galway Rovers, and took place across two legs – with the first leg being played on 1 January 1981 at Terryland Park in Galway, and the second leg being played on 8 January 1981 at Oriel Park in Dundalk. Both legs finished scoreless and Dundalk subsequently won a penalty shoot-out to win the trophy for a second time.

== Background ==
The League Cup was the first trophy of the 1980–81 League of Ireland season. The two sides had met once previously that season in the League in a 1–1 draw. Dundalk had last won the competition in 1978 – their first win in the competition. They reached the final by defeating Home Farm (2–0), St Patrick's Athletic (2–0) and Drogheda United (5–0).

Galway Rovers were appearing in their first domestic final, having entered the League of Ireland in 1977–78.

== Match ==
=== Summary ===
The first leg in Galway was marked by an injury to Galway goalkeeper, Tom Lally, in the 52nd minute. Galway elected to continue with the injured player in goals, and Dundalk subsequently failed to seriously challenge him, particularly as they then lost forward Mick Fairclough to injury a minute later. Prior to that, Dundalk had dominated the first half and hit the post through Jerome Clarke just before half-time. But, despite the injury to Lally, they appeared happy to settle for the draw, which made them favourites going into the second leg.

The second leg in Oriel Park saw Dundalk dominate again as expected, with the Galway goalmouth being described as "resembling a very crowded Eyre Square". Goalkeeper Lally, recovered from his injury the week before, had to make a number of saves to keep Dundalk out. His opposite number, Richie Blackmore, meanwhile, had little to do – as Galway's players were forced into defending on the edge of their own penalty area. In extra-time Dundalk continued to dominate possession, but could only fashion one chance, which again was saved by Lally. In the subsequent penalty shoot-out Dundalk missed two of their five penalties, while Galway missed two of their first four, leaving Lally to take their final kick to send the shoot-out to sudden-death. His penalty was saved by Blackmore, and Dundalk had won the League of Ireland Cup for the second time. They would go on to win the FAI Cup as well, later that season.

=== First leg details ===
1 January 1981
15:00

Galway Rovers	0–0	Dundalk
	Report

Terryland Park
Attendance: £4,000 gate
Referee: Kevin O'Sullivan

Galway Rovers	Dundalk

GK	(Republic of Ireland) Tom Lally
DF	(Republic of Ireland) Gerry Daly
DF	(Republic of Ireland) Martin Sheehan
DF	(Republic of Ireland) John Herrick
DF	(Republic of Ireland) James Collins
MF	(Republic of Ireland) Michael Nolan
MF	(Republic of Ireland) Fergus McDonnell
MF	(Republic of Ireland) Kevin Cassidy	(substituted off) 90'
MF	(Republic of Ireland) George Quinlivan
FW	(Republic of Ireland) Carl Humphries
FW	(Republic of Ireland) Michael McLoughlin
Substitutes:
MF	(Republic of Ireland) Philip Fay	(substituted on) 90'
Manager:
(Republic of Ireland) John Herrick

GK	(England) Richie Blackmore
RB	(Republic of Ireland) Vincent McKenna
CB	(Republic of Ireland) Tommy McConville
CB	(Republic of Ireland) Paddy Dunning
LB	(Republic of Ireland) Martin Lawlor
RM	(Republic of Ireland) Jerome Clarke
CM	(Republic of Ireland) Leo Flanagan
CM	(New Zealand) Sean Byrne
LM	(Republic of Ireland) Synan Braddish
FW	(Republic of Ireland) Mick Fairclough	(substituted off) 53'
FW	(Republic of Ireland) Willie Crawley	(substituted off) 83'
Substitutes:
FW	(Republic of Ireland) John Archbold	(substituted on) 83'
MF	(Republic of Ireland) Brian Duff	(substituted on) 53'
Manager:
(Northern Ireland) Jim McLaughlin

=== Second leg details ===
8 January 1981
20:00

Dundalk	0–0 (a.e.t.)	Galway Rovers
	Report
Penalties
Jerome Clarke (penalty missed); Leo Flanagan (penalty scored); Vincent McKenna (penalty scored); Synan Braddish (penalty missed); Paddy Dunning (penalty scored)	3–2	Carl Humphries (penalty missed); John Herrick (penalty scored); George Quinlivan (penalty missed); Fergus McDonnell (penalty scored); Tom Lally (penalty missed)

Oriel Park
Attendance: unreported
Referee: Paddy Mulhall

Dundalk	Galway Rovers

GK	(England) Richie Blackmore
RB	(Republic of Ireland) Tommy McConville
CB	(Republic of Ireland) Dermot Keely
CB	(Republic of Ireland) Paddy Dunning
LB	(Republic of Ireland) Martin Lawlor
RM	(Republic of Ireland) Jerome Clarke
CM	(Republic of Ireland) Leo Flanagan
CM	(Republic of Ireland) Vincent McKenna
LM	(Republic of Ireland) John Archbold	(substituted off) 83'
FW	(Republic of Ireland) Mick Fairclough
FW	(New Zealand) Sean Byrne	(substituted off) 59'
Substitutes:
FW	(Republic of Ireland) Willie Crawley	(substituted on) 59'
MF	(Republic of Ireland) Synan Braddish	(substituted on) 83'
Manager:
(Northern Ireland) Jim McLaughlin

GK	(Republic of Ireland) Tom Lally
DF	(Republic of Ireland) Gerry Daly
DF	(Republic of Ireland) Martin Sheehan
DF	(Republic of Ireland) John Herrick
DF	(Republic of Ireland) James Collins
MF	(Republic of Ireland) Michael Nolan
MF	(Republic of Ireland) Fergus McDonnell
MF	(Republic of Ireland) Kevin Cassidy	(substituted off) 101'
MF	(Republic of Ireland) Philip Fay	(substituted off) 86'
FW	(Republic of Ireland) Carl Humphries
FW	(Republic of Ireland) Michael McLoughlin
Substitutes:
MF	(Republic of Ireland) Tony Mannion	(substituted on) 86'
MF	(Republic of Ireland) George Quinlivan	(substituted on) 101'
Manager:
(Republic of Ireland) John Herrick
