= Larry Wyse =

Irish footballer

Personal information
- Date of birth: 13 November 1956 (age 69)
- Place of birth: Dublin, Ireland
- Position: Midfielder

Senior career*
Years	Team	Apps	(Gls)
1976–1977	Shamrock Rovers	19	(3)
1977–1984	Athlone Town	180	(46)
1984–1986	Bohemians	50	(17)
1986–1989	Dundalk	?	(21)
1989–1992	Galway United	59	(3)
1992–1993	Athlone Town	25	(1)

International career
1986	League of Ireland XI	1	(0)
- * Club domestic league appearances and goals

Larry Wyse (born 13 November 1956) was an Irish soccer player during the 1980s and 1990s.

== Career ==
He represented Shamrock Rovers, Bohemians, Athlone Town and Dundalk amongst others during his career. He made 4 appearances for Bohemians in European competition.

In Rovers' opening game of the 1976-77 League of Ireland Mick Leech and Wyse scored in a 2–1 win over Albert Rovers F.C.

However, when John Giles took over Wyse signed for Athlone Town in October 1977. Wyse had seven successful seasons at the midlands club where he was Player of the Month in September 1983.

He returned home to sign for Bohemians in July 1984

After two seasons at Dalymount Park he signed for Dundalk in July 1986 He again won the Player of the Month in January 1989.

== Honours ==
- Dundalk
  - FAI Cup: 1988
  - League of Ireland Cup: 1987,1989
- Galway United
  - FAI Cup: 1991

== Sources ==
- Paul Doolan; Robert Goggins. The Hoops. ISBN 0-7171-2121-6.
- Dave Galvin; Gerry Desmond. Irish Football Handbook. ISBN 0-9517987-3-1.
