= 1984–85 League of Ireland =

64th season of the League of Ireland

League of Ireland
- Season: 1984–85
- Dates: 16 September 1984 - 2 May 1985
- Teams: 16
- Champions: Shamrock Rovers (12th title)
- Relegated: Sligo Rovers; Drogheda United; Finn Harps; Longford Town
- European Cup: Shamrock Rovers
- UEFA Cup: Bohemians
- Cup Winners' Cup: Galway United
- Top goalscorer: Tommy Gaynor (Limerick City) & Michael O'Connor (Athlone Town); Both 17 goals
- Biggest home win: Limerick City 6–0 Drogheda United (24 February 1985)
- Biggest away win: Longford Town 0–6 St. Patrick's Athletic (24 February 1985)
- Highest scoring: Finn Harps 4–5 Drogheda United (30 September 1984)

The 1984–85 League of Ireland, known as the Famous Fried Chicken (FFC) League of Ireland for sponsorship reasons, was the 64th season of the League of Ireland, the national league for association football in the Republic of Ireland.

This was the final season before the league was split into two divisions; the League of Ireland Premier Division and the League of Ireland First Division.

== Overview ==
The league was contested by 16 teams, and Shamrock Rovers won the championship. The prize for the League Champions was £5,000.

The bottom four clubs in the league were relegated to the new First Division, which was due to begin the next season. They would be joined by Bray Wanderers, Cobh Ramblers, Derry City, Emfa A.F.C., Monaghan United and Newcastle United who were all elected to the 1985–86 League of Ireland First Division.

== Final table ==
| Pos | Team | Pld | W | D | L | GF | GA | GD | Pts | Qualification or relegation |
|---|---|---|---|---|---|---|---|---|---|---|
| 1 | Shamrock Rovers (C) | 30 | 22 | 5 | 3 | 63 | 21 | +42 | 49 | Qualification to 1985–86 European Cup |
| 2 | Bohemians | 30 | 19 | 5 | 6 | 57 | 29 | +28 | 43 | Qualification to 1985–86 UEFA Cup |
| 3 | Athlone Town | 30 | 17 | 6 | 7 | 54 | 28 | +26 | 40 | |
| 4 | University College Dublin | 30 | 12 | 14 | 4 | 41 | 26 | +15 | 38 | |
| 5 | Limerick City | 30 | 16 | 5 | 9 | 61 | 40 | +21 | 37 | |
| 6 | Galway United | 30 | 9 | 11 | 10 | 49 | 43 | +6 | 29 | Qualification to 1985–86 European Cup Winners' Cup (Note: Galway United qualified for the 1985-86 European Cup Winners' Cup after reaching the 1984–85 FAI Cup final.) |
| 7 | Waterford United | 30 | 11 | 7 | 12 | 44 | 41 | +3 | 29 | |
| 8 | Dundalk | 30 | 9 | 10 | 11 | 34 | 39 | −5 | 28 | |
| 9 | Cork City | 30 | 10 | 8 | 12 | 30 | 39 | −9 | 28 | |
| 10 | Home Farm | 30 | 11 | 5 | 14 | 43 | 47 | −4 | 27 | |
| 11 | St Patrick's Athletic | 30 | 10 | 7 | 13 | 36 | 45 | −9 | 27 | |
| 12 | Shelbourne | 30 | 9 | 8 | 13 | 39 | 46 | −7 | 26 | |
| 13 | Sligo Rovers (R) | 30 | 7 | 12 | 11 | 34 | 47 | −13 | 26 | Relegation to 1985–86 League of Ireland First Division |
| 14 | Drogheda United (R) | 30 | 7 | 10 | 13 | 43 | 60 | −17 | 24 | Relegation to 1985–86 League of Ireland First Division |
| 15 | Finn Harps (R) | 30 | 6 | 7 | 17 | 38 | 71 | −33 | 19 | Relegation to 1985–86 League of Ireland First Division |
| 16 | Longford Town (R) | 30 | 3 | 4 | 23 | 27 | 71 | −44 | 10 | Relegation to 1985–86 League of Ireland First Division |

Source: www.rsssf.com
(C) Champions; (R) Relegated

== Results ==
| Home \ Away | ATH | BOH | COR | DRO | DUN | FHA | GAL | HOM | LIM | LON | SHM | SHE | SLI | StP | UCD | WAT |
|---|---|---|---|---|---|---|---|---|---|---|---|---|---|---|---|---|
| Athlone Town | — | 1–2 | 3–0 | 1–1 | 1–1 | 3–1 | 0–0 | 3–4 | 4–1 | 1–3 | 0–0 | 3–0 | 0–0 | 2–0 | 0–1 | 1–0 |
| Bohemians | 2–1 | — | 0–1 | 2–0 | 2–1 | 1–2 | 2–1 | 4–0 | 1–2 | 4–1 | 2–0 | 1–0 | 2–0 | 6–1 | 3–2 | 2–1 |
| Cork City | 1–4 | 1–1 | — | 1–2 | 1–0 | 3–0 | 2–1 | 2–1 | 0–0 | 1–0 | 0–3 | 3–1 | 0–4 | 1–1 | 0–0 | 3–1 |
| Drogheda United | 0–1 | 1–2 | 2–1 | — | 0–0 | 0–1 | 1–1 | 1–3 | 4–3 | 6–2 | 0–2 | 1–2 | 3–3 | 1–3 | 1–1 | 4–2 |
| Dundalk | 0–2 | 1–1 | 1–0 | 4–1 | — | 1–3 | 3–1 | 2–1 | 2–1 | 1–0 | 1–1 | 0–1 | 2–2 | 0–0 | 0–0 | 1–3 |
| Finn Harps | 0–5 | 0–1 | 1–1 | 4–5 | 1–4 | — | 1–5 | 1–0 | 1–2 | 0–0 | 1–2 | 1–2 | 1–1 | 3–1 | 2–2 | 1–4 |
| Galway United | 3–5 | 1–0 | 1–2 | 2–2 | 2–0 | 2–2 | — | 3–1 | 2–0 | 2–1 | 0–1 | 2–3 | 5–0 | 2–0 | 0–0 | 2–2 |
| Home Farm | 0–2 | 1–3 | 0–1 | 1–1 | 1–1 | 4–2 | 3–1 | — | 3–2 | 1–1 | 0–2 | 2–1 | 3–1 | 1–2 | 1–1 | 2–0 |
| Limerick | 0–1 | 2–1 | 3–1 | 6–0 | 0–0 | 5–0 | 4–1 | 3–0 | — | 3–0 | 1–4 | 2–2 | 2–2 | 3–2 | 3–0 | 1–0 |
| Longford Town | 2–3 | 1–3 | 1–1 | 2–4 | 1–2 | 1–1 | 1–3 | 1–4 | 1–0 | — | 1–2 | 1–3 | 0–1 | 0–6 | 1–3 | 0–1 |
| Shamrock Rovers | 2–0 | 2–0 | 3–1 | 3–0 | 2–0 | 3–2 | 1–0 | 0–2 | 1–1 | 6–1 | — | 3–2 | 4–0 | 4–0 | 1–0 | 4–1 |
| Shelbourne | 3–1 | 2–3 | 0–0 | 0–0 | 1–2 | 1–2 | 2–2 | 0–2 | 1–2 | 3–1 | 0–0 | — | 2–0 | 1–0 | 3–3 | 0–3 |
| Sligo Rovers | 0–1 | 0–3 | 2–1 | 1–1 | 1–1 | 2–2 | 2–2 | 2–1 | 2–0 | 1–0 | 2–3 | 2–1 | — | 1–2 | 0–1 | 1–1 |
| St Patrick's Athletic | 0–2 | 1–1 | 1–0 | 1–0 | 3–2 | 5–1 | 1–1 | 1–0 | 1–3 | 1–2 | 0–2 | 0–0 | 0–0 | — | 0–2 | 1–1 |
| UCD | 1–1 | 1–1 | 0–0 | 1–1 | 3–0 | 3–0 | 1–1 | 1–1 | 1–3 | 2–1 | 1–0 | 3–1 | 1–1 | 2–0 | — | 3–0 |
| Waterford United | 0–2 | 1–1 | 2–1 | 4–0 | 3–1 | 2–1 | 0–0 | 2–0 | 2–3 | 2–0 | 2–2 | 1–1 | 2–0 | 1–2 | 0–1 | — |

Source: www.extratime.com
Legend: Blue = home team win; Yellow = draw; Red = away team win.

== Top scorers ==
| Rank | Player | Club | Goals |
|---|---|---|---|
| 1 | Tommy Gaynor | Limerick City | 17 |
| 1 | Michael O'Connor | Athlone Town | 17 |
| 3 | Jackie Jameson | Bohemians | 15 |
| 4 | Fran Hitchcock | Home Farm | 14 |
| 4 | Des Kennedy | Limerick City | 14 |
| 6 | Mick Byrne | Shamrock Rovers | 12 |
| 6 | Con McLaughlin | Finn Harps | 12 |
| 6 | Larry Wyse | Bohemians | 12 |
| 9 | Roddy Collins | Drogheda United | 10 |
| 9 | Paddy Dillon | Drogheda United | 10 |
| 9 | Terry Eviston | Athlone Town | 10 |
| 9 | Brian Gardiner | Galway United | 10 |
| 9 | Pat Morley | Waterford | 10 |
| 9 | Liam O'Brien | Shamrock Rovers | 10 |
