= 1991 FAI Cup final =

- Event: 1990–91 FAI Cup
Galway United	Shamrock Rovers
1	0
- Date: 12 May 1991
- Venue: Lansdowne Road, Dublin
- Referee: John Purcell
- Attendance: 15,257

The 1991 FAI Cup final was the final match of the 1990–91 FAI Cup, a knock-out association football competition contested annually by clubs affiliated with the Football Association of Ireland. It took place on Sunday 12 May 1991 at Lansdowne Road in Dublin, and was contested by Galway United and Shamrock Rovers. Galway won the match 1–0 to win the cup for the first time, winning what is still their only major trophy.

== Background ==
The two sides' contested the same match in the 1985 FAI Cup final six years earlier in Dalymount Park, that game saw Rovers emerge as 1–0 winners. The two teams faced each other three times in the League that season, with Rovers winning all three encounters.

=== Route to the final ===
Galway United		Round	Shamrock Rovers	
Opponent	Score	Round	Opponent	Score
Cobh Ramblers	3–1 (H)	First round	Finn Harps	4–3 (H)
Shelbourne	2–0 (H)	Second round	Sligo Rovers	2–2 (A)
-		Replay	Sligo Rovers	0–0 (4–2 p) (H)
Limerick City	2–1 (A)	Quarter-finals	Athlone Town	0–0 (A)
-		Replay	Athlone Town	1–0 (H)
St James's Gate	3–2 (H)	Semi-finals	Kilkenny City	1–0 (A)
Note: In all results above, the score of the finalist is given first (H: home; A: away).

== Match ==
=== Details ===
12 May 1991

Galway United	1–0	Shamrock Rovers
Johnny Glynn 86'

Lansdowne Road, Dublin
Attendance: 15,257
Referee: John Purcell

GK	(Republic of Ireland) Declan McIntyre
DF	(Republic of Ireland) John Morris-Burke	(substituted off) 65'
DF	(Republic of Ireland) Jimmy Nolan
DF	(Republic of Ireland) Derek Rodgers
DF	(Republic of Ireland) Peter Carpenter
DF	(Republic of Ireland) Paul Campbell
MF	(Republic of Ireland) Larry Wyse	(substituted off) 89'
MF	(Republic of Ireland) John Cleary
MF	(Republic of Ireland) Tommy Keane
MF	(Republic of Ireland) Noel Mernagh
FW	(Republic of Ireland) Johnny Glynn (c)
Substitutes:
DF	(Republic of Ireland) Stephen Lally	(substituted on) 65'
DF	(Republic of Ireland) Kevin Cassidy	(substituted on) 89'
Manager:
(Republic of Ireland) Joey Malone

GK	(Republic of Ireland) Paul Kavanagh
DF	(Republic of Ireland) John Devine	(substituted off) 87'
DF	(Republic of Ireland) Peter Eccles
DF	(Republic of Ireland) Barry Murphy
DF	(England) Wayne Cooney
DF	(Republic of Ireland) Dave Connell
MF	(Northern Ireland) David Campbell
MF	(Republic of Ireland) Neil Poutch
MF	(Republic of Ireland) Derek Tracey
FW	(Republic of Ireland) Derek Swan
FW	(Republic of Ireland) Vinny Arkins
Substitutes:
FW	(Republic of Ireland) Barry O'Connor	(substituted on) 87'
Manager:
(Republic of Ireland) Noel King

== See also ==
- 1985 FAI Cup final – contested by same teams
