= Gabbiadini =

Gabbiadini is an Italian surname. Notable people with the surname include:

- Manolo Gabbiadini (born 1991), Italian footballer
- Marco Gabbiadini (born 1968), English footballer
- Melania Gabbiadini (born 1983), Italian women's footballer
- Riccardo Gabbiadini (born 1970), Welsh footballer
