= Richard Blackmore (disambiguation) =

Richard Blackmore (1654–1729) was an English poet and physician.

Richard Blackmore may also refer to:

- Richard Blackmore (American football) (born 1956), former American football defensive back
- R. D. Blackmore (1825–1900), English novelist
- Richie Blackmore (rugby league) (born 1969), New Zealand rugby league coach and former player
- Ritchie Blackmore (born 1945), English musician
- Richard Blackmore (footballer) (born 1953), English footballer
