= Josh O'Dwyer =

Irish footballer (born 2010)

Personal information
- Date of birth: 17 March 2010 (age 16)
- Place of birth: Dublin, Ireland
- Height: 1.85 m (6 ft 1 in)
- Position: Midfielder

Team information
- Current team: FC Liefering
- Number: 8

Youth career
- –2020: Leicester Celtic
- 2020–2026: Shamrock Rovers
- 2026–: Red Bull Salzburg

Senior career*
Years	Team	Apps	(Gls)
2026	Shamrock Rovers	0	(0)
2026–	FC Liefering	0	(0)

International career^{‡}
2024–2025	Republic of Ireland U16	8	(1)
2025–	Republic of Ireland U17	14	(0)
- * Club domestic league appearances and goals as of 13:08, 1 July 2026 ‡ National team caps and goals as of 21:13, 21 November 2026

Josh O'Dwyer (born 17 March 2010) is an Irish professional footballer who plays as a midfielder for 2. Liga club FC Liefering.

== Club career ==
Born in Dublin, O'Dwyer is a youth product of Shamrock Rovers, having joined the Premier Division club from Dublin-based Leicester Celtic as a ten years old.

Making strides with the Rovers' Under-20, he appeared as one of the most gifted youngster at the club, along the likes of Victor Ozhianvuna and Michael Noonan.

O'Dwyer made his professional debut with Shamrock Rovers, starting a 3–2 away Leinster Senior Cup win over Blackrock College on 16 January 2026.

In April 2026, his transfer was announced to Red Bull Salzburg in the Austrian Bundesliga, set to first join the satellite club of FC Liefering in the Austrian second tier on 1 July 2026.

== International career ==
Born in Ireland, to a Polish mother, O'Dwyer is a youth international for the Republic of Ireland, having captained the Republic of Ireland U16 team between 2024 and 2025.

While still only 15, he started playing with the Republic of Ireland U17s, whom he helped qualified to the FIFA World Cup, having a pivotal role in their 7–0 beating of Slovakia in the March 2026 qualifiers.

On 30 May 2026, he was first called up by Heimir Hallgrímsson to the senior Republic of Ireland squad, for a friendly away to World Cup host Canada.

In November 2026, he was named in the squad for the 2026 FIFA U-17 World Cup.

== Style of play ==
A tall left-footed central midfielder, O'Dwyer has been described as a strong and powerful player who is comfortable with the ball at his feet.

== Career statistics ==
As of match played on 24 January 2026

Appearances and goals by club, season and competition
Club	Season	League			National cup		Other		Total	
Club	Season	Division	Apps	Goals	Apps	Goals	Apps	Goals	Apps	Goals
Shamrock Rovers	2026	LOI Premier Division	0	0	0	0	2 (Note: Appearances in the Leinster Senior Cup)	0	2	0
FC Liefering	2026–27	2. Liga	0	0	0	0	0	0	0	0
Career total			0	0	0	0	2	0	2	0
