= 1978 League of Ireland Cup final =

- Event: 1977–78 League of Ireland Cup
Dundalk	Cork Alberts

First Leg
Dundalk	Cork Alberts
2	2
- Date: 6 April 1978
- Venue: Oriel Park, Dundalk
- Referee: Paddy Daly
- Attendance: unreported

Second Leg
Cork Alberts	Dundalk
2	2
- Dundalk won 4–3 on penalties
- Date: 12 April 1978
- Venue: Flower Lodge, Cork
- Referee: John Carpenter
- Attendance: £710 "gate"

The 1978 League of Ireland Cup final was the final match of the 1977–78 League of Ireland Cup, a knock-out association football competition played annually by clubs affiliated with the League of Ireland. The competition was sponsored by Bass. The match was contested by Dundalk and Cork Alberts, and took place across two legs – with the first leg being played on 6 April 1978 at Oriel Park in Dundalk, and the second leg being played on 12 April 1978 at Flower Lodge in Cork. Both legs finished 2–2, and Dundalk subsequently won a penalty shoot-out to win the trophy for the first time.

== Background ==
The League Cup was the first trophy of the 1977–78 League of Ireland season. The two sides had already met twice that season in the League, with the Cork side winning both matches. Dundalk were appearing in their first final in the competition, which had replaced the League of Ireland Shield in 1973. They reached the final by defeating Shelbourne (2–1), Shamrock Rovers (1–0), Home Farm (1–0), and Sligo Rovers (on penalties after a 3–3 aggregate draw across two legs).

Cork Alberts were appearing in their first domestic final, having entered the League of Ireland in 1976–77. They defeated Waterford (1–0), Thurles Town (4–2), Cork Celtic (1–0), and Bohemians (4–3 on aggregate) to reach the final.

== Match ==
=== Summary ===
The first leg in Oriel Park saw Dundalk dominate the first half, yet approaching half-time they had failed to convert any of a number of chances. In the final seconds of the half, Jimmy Dainty sprung the Alberts' offside trap, and crossed for Terry Flanagan to score. The second half started in a similar vein, and Dundalk took a two goal lead in the 53rd minute – when Dainty headed a goal from a Mick Lawlor cross. Dundalk continued to push, but were caught out in the 61st minute when Alberts' Gerry Finnegan chipped a loose ball over the Dundalk goalkeeper, Richie Blackmore, and into the net from 25 metres. Dundalk then had a goal disallowed for offside and subsequently began to fade as Alberts dominated the closing stages. They got their equaliser in the 77th minute through Charlie McCarthy and the game ended 2–2.

The second leg repeated the pattern of the first, with Dundalk making the early running and taking a 7th minute lead through Mick Lawlor, who scored a volley from 25 metres. In the 21st minute Alberts equalised against the run of play, when Gerry Finnegan scored a free kick from the edge of the penalty area. Dundalk restored their lead a minute before half-time through Terry Flanagan, who finished off a well-worked team goal. Alberts forced Dundalk to defend deeply in the second half, and eventually scored a second equaliser in the 62nd minute, when James Nodwell met a headed clearance on the half-volley to fire to the net. With three minutes remaining Alberts were awarded a penalty, when Derek O'Brien was adjudged to have brought down Alberts winger Redmond Lane. Gerry Finnegan missed the resulting spot-kick, however, and the chance to win the final in normal time. The tie went straight to penalties, where both sides missed two kicks to send the shoot-out to sudden death. Alberts' player-manager Noel O'Mahony missed, and Dundalk's Tommy McConville scored, to send the cup to Oriel Park for the first time.

=== First leg details ===
6 April 1978
20:00

Dundalk	2–2	Cork Alberts
Terry Flanagan 45'; Jimmy Dainty 53'	Report	Gerry Finnegan 61'; Charlie McCarthy 77'

Oriel Park
Attendance: unreported
Referee: Paddy Daly

Dundalk	Cork Alberts

GK	(England) Richie Blackmore
RB	(Republic of Ireland) Derek O'Brien
CB	(Republic of Ireland) Tommy McConville
CB	(Republic of Ireland) Derek Carroll
LB	(Republic of Ireland) Paddy Dunning
RM	(England) Jimmy Dainty
CM	(Republic of Ireland) Declan Ingoldsby
CM	(Republic of Ireland) Synan Braddish
LM	(Republic of Ireland) Noel King
CF	(Republic of Ireland) Terry Flanagan
CF	(Republic of Ireland) Mick Lawlor
Substitutes:
N/A
Manager:
(Northern Ireland) Jim McLaughlin

GK	(England) Alex Ludzic
DF	(Republic of Ireland) Michael Tobin	(substituted off) 72'
DF	(Republic of Ireland) Noel O'Mahony
DF	(Republic of Ireland) Barry Notley
DF	(Republic of Ireland) John Brohan	(substituted off) 53'
MF	(Republic of Ireland) Gerry Finnegan
MF	(Republic of Ireland) John Lawson
MF	(Republic of Ireland) James Nodwell
MF	(Republic of Ireland) Junior Murphy
FW	(Republic of Ireland) Charlie McCarthy
FW	(Republic of Ireland) Redmond Lane
Substitutes:
DF	(Republic of Ireland) David Waters	(substituted in) 53'
DF	(Republic of Ireland) John McCarthy	(substituted in) 72'
Manager:
(Republic of Ireland) Noel O'Mahony

=== Second leg details ===
12 April 1978
18:30

Cork Alberts	2–2	Dundalk
Gerry Finnegan 21'; James Nodwell 62'; Gerry Finnegan (penalty missed) 87'	Report	Mick Lawlor 7'; Terry Flanagan 45'
Penalties
Alek Ludzic (penalty scored); Charlie McCarthy (penalty scored); Michael Punch (penalty missed); Gerry Finnegan (penalty missed); John McCarthy (penalty scored); Junior Murphy (penalty missed); Noel O'Mahony (penalty missed)	3–4	Declan Ingoldsby (penalty scored); Paddy Dunning (penalty scored); Jimmy Dainty (penalty scored); Terry Flanagan (penalty missed); Noel King (penalty missed); Mick Lawlor (penalty missed); Tommy McConville (penalty scored)

Flower Lodge
Attendance: £710 "gate"
Referee: John Carpenter

Cork Alberts	Dundalk

GK	(England) Alex Ludzic
DF	(Republic of Ireland) John McCarthy
DF	(Republic of Ireland) Noel O'Mahony
DF	(Republic of Ireland) Barry Notley
DF	(Republic of Ireland) John Brohan
MF	(Republic of Ireland) Gerry Finnegan
MF	(Republic of Ireland) John Lawson	(substituted off) 45'
MF	(Republic of Ireland) James Nodwell
MF	(Republic of Ireland) Junior Murphy
FW	(Republic of Ireland) Charlie McCarthy
FW	(Republic of Ireland) Redmond Lane
Substitutes:
FW	(Republic of Ireland) Michael Punch	(substituted in) 45'
Manager:
(Republic of Ireland) Noel O'Mahony

GK	(England) Richie Blackmore
RB	(Republic of Ireland) Derek O'Brien
CB	(Republic of Ireland) Tommy McConville
CB	(Republic of Ireland) Derek Carroll
LB	(Republic of Ireland) Paddy Dunning
RM	(England) Jimmy Dainty
CM	(Republic of Ireland) Declan Ingoldsby
CM	(Republic of Ireland) Gerry Dixon
LM	(Republic of Ireland) Noel King
CF	(Republic of Ireland) Terry Flanagan
CF	(Republic of Ireland) Mick Lawlor
Substitutes:
N/A
Manager:
(Northern Ireland) Jim McLaughlin
