= Richard Blackmore (footballer) =

English footballer

Personal information
- Date of birth: 18 October 1953 (age 73)
- Place of birth: Birmingham, England
- Position: Goalkeeper

Senior career*
Years	Team	Apps	(Gls)
1971–1972	Walsall	0	(0)
1972	Bristol City	0	(0)
1972	New York Cosmos	14	(0)
1973–1974	Birmingham City	0	(0)
1974–1985	Dundalk	292	(0)
1975	→ Denver Dynamos (loan)	13	(0)
1985–1988	Galway United	64	(0)
Total		383	(0)

International career
	League of Ireland XI	6	(0)
- * Club domestic league appearances and goals

Richard Blackmore (born 18 October 1953) is an English former footballer who played as a goalkeeper.

== Career ==
Blackmore began his football career with trials at Bristol Rovers, followed by short stints at Walsall and Bristol City, mainly in reserve teams. His first taste of first-class football was with New York Cosmos in 1972, where he was part of the team that won the North American Soccer League. Blackmore joined Dundalk F.C. in 1974, becoming a legendary figure over 11 seasons. He set goalkeeping records, won multiple awards, and earned the adoration of fans. His achievements include three League Championships, three FAI Cups, and numerous other honors.

After leaving Dundalk, Blackmore played for Galway United, where he continued to add to his accolades, including another League Cup Winner's medal and a second-place league finish that qualified the team for the UEFA Cup. Blackmore's career spanned 407 appearances.

== Career statistics ==
Appearances and goals by club, season and competition
Club	Season	League			FA Cup		League Cup		Leinster Cup		Continental		Other		Total	
Club	Season	Division	Apps	Goals	Apps	Goals	Apps	Goals	Apps	Goals	Apps	Goals	Apps	Goals	Apps	Goals
Walsall	1971–72	Third Division	0	0	0	0	0	0	–		–		0	0	0	0
Bristol City	1971–72	Second Division	0	0	0	0	0	0	–		–		0	0	0	0
New York Cosmos	1972	NASL	14	0	0	0	0	0	–		–		0	0	14	0
Birmingham City	1973–74	First Division	0	0	0	0	0	0	–		–		1 (Note: Appearances in the Texaco Cup)	0	1	0
Dundalk	1974–75	League of Ireland	292	0	34	0	32	0	15	0	0	0	16	0	407	0
Dundalk	1975–76	League of Ireland	292	0	34	0	32	0	15	0	0	0	16	0	407	0
Dundalk	1976–77	League of Ireland	292	0	34	0	32	0	15	0	2 (Note: Appearances in the European Cup)	0	16	0	407	0
Dundalk	1977–78	League of Ireland	292	0	34	0	32	0	15	0	2 (Note: Appearances in the Cup Winners' Cup)	0	16	0	407	0
Dundalk	1978–79	League of Ireland	292	0	34	0	32	0	15	0	0	0	16	0	407	0
Dundalk	1979–80	League of Ireland	292	0	34	0	32	0	15	0	2	0	16	0	407	0
Dundalk	1980–81	League of Ireland	292	0	34	0	32	0	15	0	2 (Note: Appearances in the UEFA Cup)	0	16	0	407	0
Dundalk	1981–82	League of Ireland	292	0	34	0	32	0	15	0	4	0	16	0	407	0
Dundalk	1982–83	League of Ireland	292	0	34	0	32	0	15	0	2	0	16	0	407	0
Dundalk	1983–84	League of Ireland	292	0	34	0	32	0	15	0	0	0	16	0	407	0
Dundalk	1984–85	League of Ireland	292	0	34	0	32	0	15	0	0	0	16	0	407	0
Dundalk	Total		292	0	34	0	32	0	15	0	18	0	16	0	407	0
Denver Dynamos (loan)	1975	NASL	13	0	0	0	0	0	–		–		0	0	13	0
Galway United	1985–86	Premier Division	64	0	–						2	0	–		68	0
Galway United	1986–87	Premier Division	64	0	–						2	0	–		68	0
Galway United	1987–88	Premier Division	64	0	–						0	0	–		68	0
Galway United	Total		64	0	0	0	0	0	0	0	4	0	0	0	68	0
Career total			383	0	34	0	32	0	15	0	22	0	17	0	503	0
