= Leicester Celtic A.F.C. =

Leicester Celtic
- Full name: Leicester Celtic Association Football Club
- Ground: Loreto Park, Nutgrove, Rathfarnham, Dublin 14
- Chairman: Gerry Whelan
- League: Leinster Senior League; Dublin and District Schoolboys League
- Website: http://www.leicesterceltic.ie
Home colours

Leicester Celtic A.F.C. is an Irish association football club based in Rathfarnham, Dublin. The club's senior team compete in the Leinster Senior League, and have previously won the Leinster Senior League Division 2A title. Youth sides compete in the Dublin and District Schoolboys League and have previously contested the FAI Youth Cup.

== History ==
Leicester Celtic was founded in 1967 by Michael Flaherty and Father C.F. Lee, then a curate in the Rathgar parish. In return for financial assistance from the parish, the name of a local street, Leicester Avenue, was to be used in the club name. In their first season, Celtic fielded one team at under-17 level. The following season two teams at under-14 and under-18 represented the club. Since 2009 Leicester Celtic has been affiliated with the Welsh football club Swansea City AFC.

== Ground ==
Leicester Celtic moved around many times in the early years, playing home games in Bushy Park and Marlay Park before eventually moving to the current base of Loreto Park in the 1980s. In 2003, an investment of €1 million saw Leicester Celtic build their own all-weather floodlit playing facility and clubhouse beside the pitches in Loreto.

== Notable former players ==
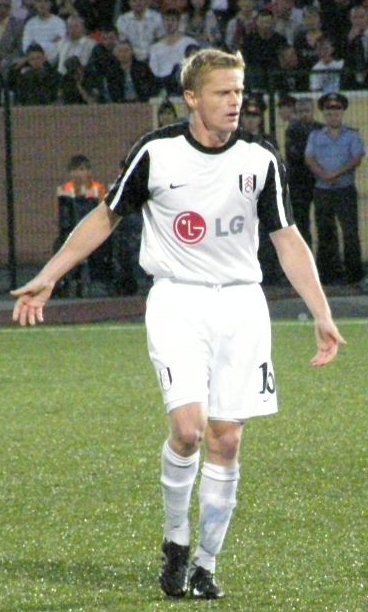
Damien Duff in action for Fulham in the 2010 UEFA Europa League Final.

=== Republic of Ireland internationals ===
- (Republic of Ireland) Damien Duff
- (Republic of Ireland) Richie Sadlier

=== Republic of Ireland youth internationals ===
- (Republic of Ireland) Josh O'Dwyer

=== Republic of Ireland under-21 internationals ===
- (Republic of Ireland) Barry Roche

=== League of Ireland XI players ===
- (Republic of Ireland) John Coady
- (Republic of Ireland) Barry Murphy
- (Republic of Ireland) Paul Osam

=== Other sports ===
The following former Leicester Celtic players have represented Ireland at various other sports.

- (Republic of Ireland) Ray Cosgrove – Dublin GAA player, represented Ireland international rules football team
- (Republic of Ireland) Scott Evans – badminton player, represented Ireland at the 2008 Summer Olympics and 2012 Summer Olympics
- (Republic of Ireland) Eric Miller – represented Ireland national rugby union team and the British and Irish Lions
- (Republic of Ireland) David Gillick – international track and field athlete
