= Tommy Keane =

Irish footballer (1968-2012)

Personal information
- Date of birth: 16 September 1968
- Place of birth: Dublin, Ireland
- Date of death: 28 December 2012 (aged 44)
- Place of death: Galway, Ireland
- Height: 5 ft 6 in (1.68 m)
- Position: Midfielder

Youth career
- West United

Senior career*
Years	Team	Apps	(Gls)
1985–1987	Bournemouth	3	(0)
1987–1988	Colchester United	16	(0)
1988–1991	Galway United	81	(21)
1991–1992	Sligo Rovers	7	(0)
1991–1992	Galway United	15	(5)
1992–1993	Finn Harps	27	(7)
1993–1995	Athlone Town	39	(4)
Total		188	(37)
- * Club domestic league appearances and goals

Tommy Keane (16 September 1968 – 28 December 2012) was an Irish professional footballer who played as a midfielder.

== Early life ==
Keane was born in Dublin and raised in Galway.

== Career ==
Keane played in England for Bournemouth and Colchester United, making a total of 19 appearances in the Football League

In October 1988 he returned to Ireland and was signed by manager John Herrick for Galway United, making his League of Ireland debut on 23 October 1988 at Cobh Ramblers. His first league goal came in Seamus McDonagh's first game as player manager in a 2–1 home win over Cork City on 27 November

During the 1990-91 League of Ireland season he was Galway's top league scorer with 8 goals. He also scored in every round of the FAI Cup up to the final. On the biggest day in Galway's history he put in a Man of the Match performance as Galway United beat favourites Shamrock Rovers. He also played for Sligo Rovers, Finn Harps and Athlone Town.

His last League of Ireland goal came on 6 November 1994 when he came on as a substitute at the Brandywell Stadium on his season debut and scored a header with his first touch

His last League of Ireland game was on 22 September 1995 as a substitute for Athlone against Cork City Keane played for Galway in a friendly against Leicester City in July 1998.

He scored a total of 37 goals in 114 appearances for Galway United in all competitions He also represented Ireland at youth international level.

== Death ==
Keane died on 28 December 2012 in Galway, after playing in an indoor soccer tournament.

== Honours ==
- Galway United
  - FAI Cup – 1991
