= 2012 League of Ireland Premier Division =

League of Ireland Premier Division
- Season: 2012
- Champions: Sligo Rovers (3rd title)
- UEFA Champions League: Sligo Rovers
- UEFA Europa League: Derry City; Drogheda United; St. Patrick's Athletic
- Setanta Cup: Sligo Rovers; Derry City; Drogheda United; St. Patrick's Athletic; Shamrock Rovers; Cork City
- Matches: 165
- Goals: 437 (2.65 per match)
- Top goalscorer: Gary Twigg: 22 (Shamrock Rovers)
- Biggest home win: Shamrock Rovers 7–0 Dundalk
- Biggest away win: Bray Wanderers 0–4 Derry City
- Highest scoring: Bray Wanderers 2–4 Drogheda United; St. Patrick's Athletic 5–1 Shamrock Rovers; Shamrock Rovers 6–0 Dundalk; Bray Wanderers 3–3 St. Patrick's Athletic; Cork City 4–2 UCD
- Highest attendance: 6,097; Sligo Rovers 0–2 Shamrock Rovers
- Lowest attendance: 151; Monaghan United 0–1 Bray Wanderers
- Total attendance: 281,925 (Note: Figures include results from matches played against Monaghan United who withdrew midway through the season https://www.researchgate.net/figure/League-of-Ireland-Premier-Division-Attendance_tbl1_286919999)
- Average attendance: 1,575 (Note: Figures include results from matches played against Monaghan United who withdrew midway through the season https://www.researchgate.net/figure/League-of-Ireland-Premier-Division-Attendance_tbl1_286919999)

The 2012 League of Ireland Premier Division was the 28th season of the League of Ireland Premier Division. The division featured 12 teams. Sligo Rovers were champions, winning their first top league title since 1976–77. Drogheda United finished as runners-up.

== Teams ==
=== Stadia and locations ===
Locations of Premier Division teams
Locations of Dublin Premier Division teams

Team	Location	Stadium
Bohemians	Phibsborough	Dalymount Park
Bray Wanderers	Bray	Carlisle Grounds
Cork City	Cork	Turners Cross
Derry City	Derry	Brandywell Stadium
Drogheda United	Drogheda	United Park
Dundalk	Dundalk	Oriel Park
Monaghan United	Monaghan	Kingspan Century Park
Shamrock Rovers	Tallaght	Tallaght Stadium
Shelbourne	Drumcondra	Tolka Park
Sligo Rovers	Sligo	The Showgrounds
St. Patrick's Athletic	Inchicore	Richmond Park
UCD	Belfield	UCD Bowl

=== Personnel and kits ===
Team	Manager	Captain	Kit manufacturer	Shirt sponsor
Bohemians	(Republic of Ireland) Aaron Callaghan	(Republic of Ireland) Owen Heary	Macron	DHL
Bray Wanderers	(Republic of Ireland) Pat Devlin	(Republic of Ireland) Danny O'Connor	Adidas	Sinnot Autos Volkswagen
Cork City	(Republic of Ireland) Tommy Dunne	(England) Dan Murray	Umbro	Clonakilty Blackpudding
Derry City	(Northern Ireland) Declan Devine	(Republic of Ireland) Kevin Deery	Hummel	Diamond Corrugated
Drogheda United	(Republic of Ireland) Mick Cooke	(Republic of Ireland) Paul Crowley	Vandanel	Scotch Hall Shopping Centre
Dundalk	(Republic of Ireland) Darius Kierans	(Republic of Ireland) Chris Shields	Umbro	Fyffes
Monaghan United	(Republic of Ireland) Roddy Collins	(Republic of Ireland) Alan Byrne	Nike	None
Shamrock Rovers	(England) Brian Laws	(Republic of Ireland) Ken Oman	Umbro	SEAT
Shelbourne	(Republic of Ireland) Alan Mathews	(Republic of Ireland) David Cassidy	Macron	Cab 2000
Sligo Rovers	(England) Ian Baraclough	(England) Danny Ventre	Jako	Connolly's Volkswagen
St. Patrick's Athletic	(Republic of Ireland) Liam Buckley	(Republic of Ireland) Conor Kenna	Umbro	Nissan Motors
UCD	(Republic of Ireland) Martin Russell	(Republic of Ireland) Michael Leahy	O'Neills	O'Neills Soccer

=== Managerial changes ===
Team	Outgoing manager	Manner of departure	Date of vacancy	Position in table	Incoming manager	Date of appointment
Dundalk	(England) Ian Foster	Contract Ended	29 October 2011	Pre-season	(Republic of Ireland) Sean McCaffrey	23 December 2011
Bohemians	(Republic of Ireland) Pat Fenlon	Signed by Hibernian	25 November 2011	Pre-season	(Republic of Ireland) Aaron Callaghan	31 December 2011
St. Patrick's Athletic	(Republic of Ireland) Pete Mahon	Contract Ended	2 December 2011	Pre-season	(Republic of Ireland) Liam Buckley	2 December 2011
Derry City	(Republic of Ireland) Stephen Kenny	Resigned	24 December 2011	Pre-season	(Northern Ireland) Declan Devine	6 January 2012
Shamrock Rovers	(Northern Ireland) Michael O'Neill	Signed by Northern Ireland	24 December 2011	Pre-season	(Republic of Ireland) Stephen Kenny	27 December 2011
Sligo Rovers	(England) Paul Cook	Signed by Accrington Stanley	13 February 2012	Pre-season	(England) Ian Baraclough	27 February 2012
Dundalk	(Republic of Ireland) Sean McCaffrey	Mutual Consent	12 January 2012	10th	Stephen Kenny	N/A
Shamrock Rovers	(Republic of Ireland) Stephen Kenny	Sacked	11 September 2012	4th	(England) Brian Laws	17 September 2012
Bray Wanderers	(Republic of Ireland) Keith Long	Mutual Consent	September 2012	9th	(Republic of Ireland) Pat Devlin	September 2012

== Overview ==
There was a mid-season break coinciding with the Republic of Ireland national football team's UEFA Euro 2012 finals campaign. On 18 June 2012, Monaghan United announced their withdrawal from the league. Their record was subsequently expunged. The Premier Division title was won by Sligo Rovers, their first title in thirty five years.

== Final table ==
Pos	Team	Pld	W	D	L	GF	GA	GD	Pts	Qualification or relegation
1	Sligo Rovers (C)	30	17	10	3	53	23	+30	61	Qualification for Champions League second qualifying round
2	Drogheda United	30	17	6	7	51	36	+15	57	Qualification for Europa League first qualifying round
3	St Patrick's Athletic	30	15	10	5	44	22	+22	55	Qualification for Europa League first qualifying round
4	Shamrock Rovers	30	14	10	6	56	37	+19	52	
5	Derry City	30	11	6	13	36	36	0	39	Qualification for Europa League second qualifying round (Note: Derry City qualified for the UEFA Europa League second qualifying round after winning the 2012 FAI Cup Final.)
6	Cork City	30	8	12	10	38	36	+2	36	
7	Bohemians	30	9	9	12	35	38	−3	36	
8	Shelbourne	30	9	8	13	35	43	−8	35	
9	UCD	30	8	7	15	32	48	−16	31	
10	Bray Wanderers	30	5	10	15	33	54	−21	25	
11	Dundalk (O)	30	4	8	18	23	63	−40	20	Qualification for relegation play-off
12	Monaghan United (R)	0	0	0	0	0	0	0	0	Withdrew from league (Note: Monaghan United withdrew after 14 games. Their record was expunged.)

(C) Champions; (O) Play-off winners; (R) Relegated

== Results ==
=== Matches 1–22 ===
Home \ Away	BOH	BRW	COR	DER	DRO	DUN	SHM	SHE	SLI	StP	UCD
Bohemians	—	0–0	1–0	1–2	1–1	2–1	4–0	0–2	0–0	0–0	1–0
Bray Wanderers	2–1	—	0–3	0–4	2–4	1–1	2–2	2–3	1–2	3–3	3–1
Cork City	1–1	1–1	—	2–2	2–3	3–2	1–1	0–0	0–1	0–1	4–2
Derry City	1–0	3–2	2–0	—	0–3	1–2	0–1	0–1	1–2	0–2	0–0
Drogheda United	1–0	3–1	1–1	2–0	—	0–0	1–2	3–1	1–3	0–0	1–0
Dundalk	0–2	0–2	1–1	1–1	1–2	—	1–1	0–0	1–2	0–2	2–1
Shamrock Rovers	2–0	0–0	1–1	1–1	3–1	6–0	—	4–0	1–1	1–1	2–2
Shelbourne	1–2	2–1	1–2	1–0	1–2	4–0	2–3	—	1–1	1–1	1–2
Sligo Rovers	1–0	1–1	2–2	1–1	4–1	3–0	3–0	3–0	—	1–1	2–1
St Patrick's Athletic	2–1	1–0	0–0	3–0	0–2	1–2	5–1	1–0	0–0	—	2–0
UCD	1–2	2–3	1–0	0–1	1–1	1–1	0–2	0–2	1–0	1–1	—

Source: www.rsssf.com
Legend: Blue = home team win; Yellow = draw; Red = away team win.

=== Matches 23–33 ===
Home \ Away	BOH	BRW	COR	DER	DRO	DUN	SHM	SHE	SLI	StP	UCD
Bohemians	—	—	1–1	—	1–4	—	—	2–2	—	2–3	—
Bray Wanderers	1–4	—	—	0–0	1–3	—	1–3	—	0–0	—	—
Cork City	—	2–0	—	—	3–2	3–0	1–2	—	0–0	—	—
Derry City	2–0	—	0–1	—	—	4–0	—	—	—	2–1	1–2
Drogheda United	—	—	—	2–1	—	3–2	0–2	2–1	2–1	0–0	—
Dundalk	2–2	2–1	—	—	—	—	—	0–1	—	0–1	1–2
Shamrock Rovers	0–1	—	—	1–3	—	7–0	—	2–2	—	—	2–1
Shelbourne	—	0–0	3–2	0–2	—	—	—	—	1–3	0–2	—
Sligo Rovers	3–1	—	—	4–1	—	3–0	0–2	—	—	3–2	3–0
St Patrick's Athletic	—	0–1	1–0	—	—	—	2–1	—	—	—	5–0
UCD	2–2	3–1	3–2	—	1–0	—	—	1–1	—	—	—

Source: www.rsssf.com
Legend: Blue = home team win; Yellow = draw; Red = away team win.

== Promotion/relegation play-off ==
Dundalk, the eleventh placed team from the Premier Division, played Waterford United, the winner of the First Division play-off. The winner of this play off would play in the 2013 Premier Division.

30 October 2012	Dundalk	2–2	Waterford United	Oriel Park
	Lorcan Shannon 23'; Stephen McDonnell 75'	[ Report]	Paul Phelan 50'; Ben Ryan 60'	Referee: Paul McLaughlin (Monaghan)

2 November 2012	Waterford United	0–2	Dundalk	Waterford RSC
		[ Report]	Michael Rafter 45', 68'	Attendance: 3,000; Referee: Padraig Sutton (Clare)

Dundalk win 4–2 on aggregate and retained their place in the Premier Division. Waterford United appealed the result of the playoff, claiming Michael Rafter was ineligible as Dundalk had incorrectly registered him when they signed him earlier that season. However the appeal was unsuccessful.

== Awards ==
=== Top scorers ===
Rank	Scorer	Club	Goals
1	(Scotland) Gary Twigg	Shamrock Rovers	22
2	(England) Danny North	Sligo Rovers	15
3	(Republic of Ireland) Jason Byrne	Bray Wanderers	14

=== Player of the Month ===
Month	Player	Club
March	(Scotland) Gary Twigg	Shamrock Rovers
April	(Republic of Ireland) Christopher Forrester	St Patrick's Athletic
May	(Republic of Ireland) Jason Byrne	Bray Wanderers
June	(England) Danny North	Sligo Rovers
July	(Republic of Ireland) Chris Fagan	St Patrick's Athletic
August	(Republic of Ireland) Mark Quigley	Sligo Rovers
September	(Republic of Ireland) Jason McGuinness	Sligo Rovers
October	(Scotland) Gary Twigg	Shamrock Rovers
November	(Northern Ireland) Rory Patterson	Derry City

== See also ==
- 2012 League of Ireland First Division
- 2012 League of Ireland Cup
