= 1986–87 League of Ireland First Division =

League of Ireland First Division
- Season: 1986–87
- Champions: Derry City F.C.
- Promoted: Shelbourne F.C.
- Top goalscorer: Aleksandar Krstić: 18 (Derry City)

The 1986–87 League of Ireland First Division season was the second season of the League of Ireland First Division.

== Overview ==
The First Division was contested by 10 teams and Derry City F.C. won the division.

== Final table ==
Pos	Team	Pld	W	D	L	GF	GA	GD	Pts	Promotion
1	Derry City F.C.	18	16	1	1	45	14	+31	33	Promoted
2	Shelbourne F.C.	18	12	3	3	39	20	+19	27	Promoted
3	Drogheda United F.C.	18	10	4	4	41	22	+19	24	
4	Finn Harps F.C.	18	10	2	6	32	24	+8	22	
5	University College Dublin A.F.C.	18	8	3	7	22	22	0	19	
6	Cobh Ramblers F.C.	18	5	5	8	31	32	−1	15	
7	Newcastlewest F.C.	18	4	4	10	17	32	−15	12	
8	Monaghan United F.C.	18	3	5	10	20	34	−14	11	
9	E.M.F.A.	18	3	4	11	17	31	−14	10	
10	Longford Town F.C.	18	2	3	13	16	49	−33	7	

== See also ==
- 1986–87 League of Ireland Premier Division
