= Wayne Cooney =

English footballer

Personal information
- Date of birth: 23 March 1968 (age 58)
- Place of birth: Birmingham, England
- Position: Full back

Youth career
- ?–1988: Norwich City

Senior career*
Years	Team	Apps	(Gls)
1988–1992	Shamrock Rovers	98	(6)
1992–1994	Dundalk	34	(3)
1994–1996	Bohemians	16	(2)
1996–1997	Newry City	1	(0)
1997–1998	Cliftonville	4	(0)
Total		153	(11)

International career
1984–1986	Republic of Ireland U19	?	(?)
- * Club domestic league appearances and goals

Wayne Cooney (born 23 March 1968) is a former footballer who played in the League of Ireland during the 1990s.

== Career ==
Born in Birmingham, Cooney started his career at Norwich City before returning to Dublin to sign for Noel King's Shamrock Rovers side in 1988. He made his debut on 4 September and became a popular figure with the fans in his 4 years at Rovers. He made a total of 127 appearances scoring 6 times for the Hoops.

He then moved to Dundalk. After a couple of seasons at Oriel Park, he became Turlough O'Connor's first signing for Bohemians where he scored his debut for Bohs on 3 January 1994 in a 2-0 league win over Cobh Ramblers. He made 4 appearances in European competition for Bohs, all of them in the 1995 Intertoto Cup.

Cooney earned caps for the Republic of Ireland national under-19 team.
