= Sean McCaffrey =

Irish football manager (1959–2017)

Personal information
- Date of birth: 12 September 1959
- Place of birth: Monaghan, Ireland
- Date of death: 30 December 2017 (aged 58)

Managerial career
- Years: Team
- Monaghan United
- 2003–2010: Republic of Ireland U17
- 2003–2010: Republic of Ireland U19
- 2012: Dundalk

Sean McCaffrey (12 September 1959 – 30 December 2017) was an Irish football manager.

== Career ==
He was the first team manager of League of Ireland Premier Division side Dundalk taking over in January 2012, replacing Ian Foster. He left the club by mutual consent in July 2017.

McCaffrey was involved in the establishment of his home town club Monaghan United in 1979, and subsequently managed the team for a number of years, including their debut League of Ireland season in 1985–86.

In 2003, he succeeded Brian Kerr as coach of the Republic of Ireland U17, U18 and U19 teams, remaining in the role until 2010.

He died on 30 December 2017 from heart failure
