= 1993–94 League of Ireland First Division =

League of Ireland First Division
- Season: 1993–94
- Champions: Sligo Rovers
- Promoted: Athlone Town
- European Cup Winners' Cup: Sligo Rovers (Note: Sligo Rovers qualified for the 1994–95 European Cup Winners' Cup after winning the 1993–94 FAI Cup final.)
- Top goalscorer: Karl Gannon: 16 (Home Farm)

The 1993–94 League of Ireland First Division season was the 9th season of the League of Ireland First Division.

== Overview ==
The First Division was contested by 10 teams and Sligo Rovers F.C. won the division. Under player manager Willie McStay and with a team that also included Riccardo Gabbiadini and Eddie Annand, Rovers also completed a treble when they won the First Division Shield and the FAI Cup.

== Final table ==
Pos	Team	Pld	W	D	L	GF	GA	GD	Pts	Promotion or qualification
1	Sligo Rovers F.C.	27	14	8	5	42	19	+23	50	Promoted to Premier Division
2	Athlone Town A.F.C.	27	11	13	3	34	22	+12	46	Promoted to Premier Division
3	Finn Harps F.C.	27	11	9	7	35	35	0	42	Lost promotion/relegation play-off
4	University College Dublin A.F.C.	27	10	10	7	37	23	+14	40	
5	Longford Town F.C.	27	9	7	11	35	39	−4	34	
6	Home Farm F.C.	27	7	11	9	34	39	−5	32	
7	Waterford United F.C.	27	6	13	8	32	33	−1	31	
8	Kilkenny City A.F.C.	27	5	15	7	31	42	−11	30	
9	Bray Wanderers A.F.C.	27	4	15	8	17	27	−10	27	
10	St James's Gate F.C.	27	1	13	13	23	41	−18	16	

== Promotion/relegation play-off ==
Third placed Finn Harps F.C. played off against Cobh Ramblers F.C. who finished in tenth place in the 1993–94 League of Ireland Premier Division. The winner would compete in the 1994–95 League of Ireland Premier Division.

=== 1st leg ===
9 April 1994	Finn Harps F.C.	1–0	Cobh Ramblers F.C.

=== 2nd leg ===
16 April 1994	Cobh Ramblers F.C.	3–0	Finn Harps F.C.

Cobh Ramblers F.C. won 3–1 on aggregate and retain their place in the Premier Division

== See also ==
- 1993–94 League of Ireland Premier Division
