= Aleksandar Krstić =

Serbian footballer (born 1962)

Personal information
- Date of birth: 10 April 1962 (age 64)
- Place of birth: Belgrade, SFR Yugoslavia
- Position: Striker

Senior career*
| Years | Team | Apps | (Gls) |
| 1984–1986 | Orléans | 40 | (6) |
| 1986–1987 | Derry City | 17 | (18) |
| 1987–1989 | 1. FC Saarbrücken | 31 | (7) |
| 1989–1990 | Derry City | 29 | (13) |
| 1990–1992 | Rodez AF | 62 | (21) |
| 1992–1994 | Beira-Mar | 42 | (6) |
| 1994–1996 | Felgueiras | 28 | (6) |
- * Club domestic league appearances and goals

Aleksandar "Alex" Krstić (Serbian Cyrillic: Александар Kpcтић; born 10 April 1962) is a Serbian football agent and former player.

== Playing career ==
Krstić played with Derry City in the League of Ireland and was the top goal-scorer in the 1986–87 League of Ireland First Division season with 18 goals. He missed a penalty at the Estádio da Luz against Benfica in a European Cup tie in 1989.

He guested for Shamrock Rovers in a win over Manchester United in March 1987 at Glenmalure Park.

Krstic later moved to play in Germany with 1. FC Saarbrücken and then came back to France, He ended his career in Portugal.

== Football agency ==
He lives in Montpellier since, operating as an agent for a number of footballers from or playing in France, as well as his native Serbia, including the likes of Stéphane Dalmat, El Hadji Diouf and Danijel Ljuboja.
