= Riccardo Gabbiadini =

Welsh footballer

Personal information
- Date of birth: 11 March 1970 (age 56)
- Place of birth: Newport, Monmouthshire, Wales
- Position: Striker

Senior career*
Years	Team	Apps	(Gls)
1987–1988	York City	1	(0)
1988–1989	Sunderland	1	(0)
1989	→ Blackpool (loan)	5	(3)
1989–1991	Grimsby Town	3	(1)
1990	→ Brighton & Hove Albion (loan)	1	(0)
1990	→ Crewe Alexandra (loan)	2	(0)
1991–1992	Hartlepool United	14	(2)
1992	Scarborough	7	(1)
1992	Carlisle United	24	(3)
1994	Sligo Rovers	8	(2)
- * Club domestic league appearances and goals

Riccardo Gabbiadini (born 11 March 1970) is a Welsh former footballer. He is the brother of former player Marco Gabbiadini, and played his solitary game for Sunderland alongside his brother in the 1988-89 Second Division season.

In January 1994 Gabbiadini signed for Sligo Rovers in the League of Ireland First Division. Under manager Willie McStay, he was a key member of the team that won the 1993–94 League of Ireland First Division title and League of Ireland First Division Shield, before beating four Premier Division sides en route to winning the FAI Cup. His best moment of the campaign was an audacious chipped goal in a crucial away game against Athlone Town near the end of the season. The win enabled Sligo to leapfrog Athlone Town, and they held on to take the title. Scored two goals in eight league appearances for Sligo.

In the Northern section of Masters Football 2011 he represented Sunderland along with brother Marco however he failed to score and Sunderland failed to qualify from the group stages. The Sunderland 'Masters 2011' team also included Sean Musgrave, Martin Gray, Lee Howey, Martin Smith, Marco Gabbiadini, Chris Makin and Brian Atkinson.

== Honours ==
Sligo Rovers

- FAI Cup
  - 1993–94
- League of Ireland First Division
  - 1993–94
- League of Ireland First Division Shield
