= Tommy Gaynor =

Irish footballer (born 1963)

Personal information
- Date of birth: 29 January 1963 (age 63)
- Place of birth: Limerick, Ireland
- Position: Forward

Senior career*
Years	Team	Apps	(Gls)
1981–1982	Limerick United	25	(7)
1982–1983	Shamrock Rovers	22	(7)
1983–1984	Dundalk	22	(4)
1984–1986	Limerick City	58	(35)
1986–1987	Doncaster Rovers	33	(7)
1987–1992	Nottingham Forest	57	(10)
1990–1991	→ Newcastle United (loan)	4	(1)
1992–1993	Millwall	3	(0)
1993–1994	Derry City	29	(11)
1994–1995	Cork City	27	(7)
1995–1996	Athlone Town	27	(12)
1996–1997	Cork City	?	(?)
1996–1997	Athlone Town	?	(?)
1997	Bohemians	7	(2)
1997–1998	St Patrick's Athletic	11	(1)
1998–1999	Limerick	?	(?)
1998–1999	Kilkenny City	?	(?)

International career
1986	League of Ireland XI	2	(1)

Managerial career
- 2007: Kilkenny City
- * Club domestic league appearances and goals

Tommy Gaynor (born 29 January 1963) was an Irish footballer who played as a forward during the 1980s and 1990s.

== Career ==
He made his League of Ireland debut on 13 September 1981 for Limerick United, before signing for Shamrock Rovers in 1982. He scored two goals in three appearances for the club in the UEFA Cup. He left to sign for Dundalk in 1983. He moved back to Limerick where he was joint top scorer in 1984–85 and top scorer in 1985–86.

He signed for Nottingham Forest in 1987. At the City Ground, he helped Forest win the Football League Cup and Full Members' Cup in 1989 scoring 20 goals, most notably with 4 goals on the second round tie against Chester City, when they also finished third in the Football League First Division. However, he was left out of the side for the League Cup final of 1990, when Forest retained their trophy. In his time at the City Ground, Gaynor was one of the Forest players who had to cope with the horrors of the Hillsborough disaster during the opening minutes of their FA Cup semi-final against Liverpool. Gaynor played in the rescheduled game at Old Trafford, which Liverpool won 3–1. Despite scoring regularly for the Forest first team, he spent the majority of his time as a reserve player, often behind considerably less prolific strikers.

He signed for Millwall in 1992, but returned to his homeland with Derry City. Despite guesting for Shelbourne in a friendly against Tottenham Hotspur, he signed for Cork City in August 1993, initially on a month's loan. This deal became permanent but Gaynor had a turbulent relationship with the then Bishopstown-based club. In December 1994, he failed to turn up for a league game.

He signed for Athlone Town in October 1995 and scored twice on his debut. He was Athlone's top scorer that season with 12 league goals. He rejoined Cork in September 1996, but was back playing for Athlone in early 1997. Gaynor transferred to Bohemians in February 1997 and again scored on his debut.

He had further spells with St Patrick's Athletic, where he scored against Celtic in a friendly, Limerick and Kilkenny City.

He was appointed Kilkenny City manager on 11 July 2007.

== Honours ==
Nottingham Forest

- Football League Cup: 1988–89
- Full Members' Cup: 1988–89
