= John Coady =

Irish former footballer

Personal information
- Date of birth: 25 August 1960 (age 66)
- Place of birth: Dublin, Ireland
- Height: 5 ft 9 in (1.75 m)
- Position: Defender

Youth career
- Leicester Celtic
- Rangers

Senior career*
Years	Team	Apps	(Gls)
1982–1986	Shamrock Rovers	86	(14)
1986–1988	Chelsea	16	(2)
1988–1992	Derry City	101	(13)
1992–1993	Shamrock Rovers	19	(1)
1993–1994	Monaghan United	29	(1)
1994–1996	Dundalk	58	(3)
1996–1997	Home Farm	31	(3)
1997–1998	Drogheda	25	(2)
1998–1999	Monaghan United	16	(1)
Total		382	(40)

International career
1984–1994	League of Ireland XI	4	(0)
- * Club domestic league appearances and goals

John Coady (born 25 August 1960) is an Irish former footballer who played at both the left back position and in left midfield.

== Early years ==
He attended Synge Street CBS, where he played on the school's first successful soccer team, winning the Leinster Junior School's Cup in 1977. He played club football at Leicester Celtic AFC He also played gaelic football both at school and for Synge Street PPGFC.

== Professional career ==
John is a lifelong Shamrock Rovers supporter and so his dream came true when he made his League of Ireland debut on 31 October 1982 away to UCD scoring twice in a 2-2 draw. After winning 3 Leagues and the FAI Cup twice he signed for Chelsea F.C. in London for £25,000 in December 1986.

He made his debut at the age of 26 on 18 April 1987 and scoring the only Chelsea goal in a 1-1 draw away to Queens Park Rangers. He made 9 league appearances (plus 7 more as a substitute) with Chelsea, scoring in two of them.

Coady transferred to Derry City F.C. in October 1988 for £15,000 where he won the domestic treble.

Following another stint at Shamrock Rovers in the 1992/93 season where he scored once in 23 total appearances he moved on to play for Monaghan United (two spells), Dundalk and Home Farm Everton before finishing his career at Drogheda United where he scored on his debut .

He played in the 1995-96 UEFA Cup for Dundalk.

He represented the League of Ireland XI twice and scored once in the European Cup in 7 European appearances for Rovers. He also won one cap for Ireland in the 1988 Summer Olympics qualifiers. Other honours included captaining the League of Ireland in victories over IFK Göteborg and the League of Wales.

A life-long Shamrock Rovers supporter, he is a season ticket holder at Tallaght Stadium.

== Honours ==
- League of Ireland: 6
  - Shamrock Rovers 1983/84, 1984/85, 1985/86, 1986/87
  - Derry City 1989/90
  - Dundalk 1994/95
- FAI Cup: 3
  - Shamrock Rovers 1985, 1986
  - Derry City 1989
- League of Ireland Cup
  - Derry City - 1989
- LFA President's Cup:
  - Shamrock Rovers 1984/85

== Sources ==
- Dave Galvin; Gerry Desmond. Irish Football Handbook. ISBN 0-9517987-3-1.
