= Mick Byrne (Irish footballer) =

Irish footballer and manager (born 1960)

Personal information
- Date of birth: 14 January 1960 (age 66)
- Place of birth: Dublin, Ireland
- Position: Striker

Senior career*
Years	Team	Apps	(Gls)
1978–1981	Bohemians	45	(8)
1981–1984	Shelbourne	68	(23)
1984–1988	Shamrock Rovers	87	(42)
1988	ADO Den Haag	12	(2)
1988	Shamrock Rovers	0	(0)
1988–1990	Huddersfield Town	56	(11)
1989–1990	→ Shelbourne (loan)	14	(4)
1990–1991	Shamrock Rovers	16	(4)
1991–1992	Sligo Rovers	27	(4)
1992	Dundalk	3	(0)
1992	Shelbourne	3	(0)
1992–1995	Monaghan United	83	(25)
1995	→ Dundalk (loan)	8	(4)
1995–1996	Dundalk	16	(3)
1996	St James's Gate	1	(0)
1996	Athlone Town	1	(0)
1996–1997	Shamrock Rovers	1	(0)

International career
1984	League of Ireland XI	1	(0)

Managerial career
- 1996–1997: St James's Gate F.C.
- 1997–1999: Shamrock Rovers
- * Club domestic league appearances and goals

Michael Byrne (born 14 January 1960) is an Irish footballer who played during the 1970s, 1980s and 1990s.

== Playing career ==
Byrne made his Bohs debut in the 1979 FAI League Cup final win over Shamrock Rovers on 22 March 1979. He made his League of Ireland debut three days later.

He had a spell at Shelbourne, where he was Player of the Month in February 1982. He attracted the interest of Manchester City during his time at Shels. Byrne signed for Shamrock Rovers in the summer of 1984.

In each of his three seasons at Milltown, he won the domestic double as well as represented the League in the Olympic qualifiers. He was the top scorer in the 1986–87 League of Ireland Premier Division season and made 6 appearances in European competition. Transfer talks with Saint-Étienne and Feyenoord did not work out, so after 72 goals in 146 games, in January 1988 he signed for ADO Den Haag thus ending an extraordinarily successful period at Rovers.

He briefly re-signed for Rovers again in July 1988 but after 3 goals in 6 games he left for Huddersfield Town the following month for £20,000. After two seasons in which he scored 11 goals in 56 league games, he came back to Rovers for the club's first season in the RDS but left in January 1991 after 5 goals in 20 appearances as the club had an abundance of strikers. At Sligo, he scored 6 goals in 34 total appearances, 27 in the league.

During his time at Rovers, he scored 46 league goals and 10 goals in the FAI Cup. He also played in 3 1988 Summer Olympics qualifiers, scoring twice.

He had two more spells at Shels and also represented Dundalk, Monaghan United, St. James's Gate (one game) and Athlone Town during his career. With Monaghan he finished as the 1992–93 League of Ireland First Division top scorer and his 15 league goals helped them gain promotion.

He was Rovers top goalscorer in 1984/85, 1986/87 and 1987/88 and made 5 appearances in Europe.

At the end of the 2012 League of Ireland season Byrne is joint twenty seventh in the all-time League of Ireland goalscoring list with 117 league goals.

== Management career ==
In 1996, he managed St. James's Gate for two games, playing once, before their resignation from the league. He then returned to Rovers as assistant manager to Pat Byrne before taking over as the manager for the 1997/98 season. In his first season in charge he guided the club to a win in Europe, but his second season ended badly as Rovers finished 8th. He was replaced by Damien Richardson.
