= Gortakeegan =

Soccer venue in Monaghan, Ireland

- Gort an Chaocháin
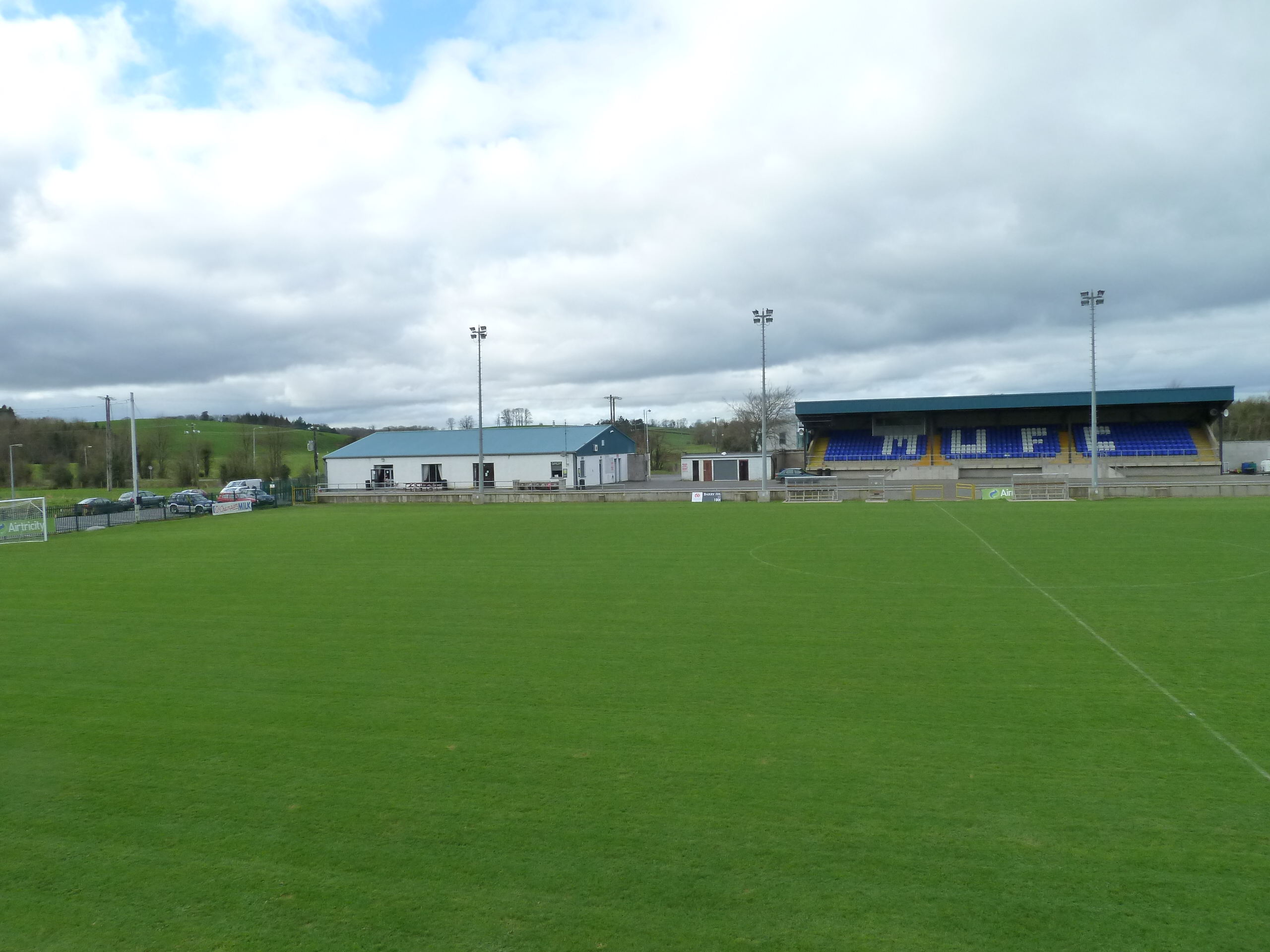
- Interactive map of Gortakeegan
- Former names: Century Homes Park; Kingspan Century Park (2005–2011)
- Location: Monaghan; Ireland
- Coordinates: 54.2333°N 6.9667°W
- Operator: Monaghan United
- Capacity: 5,000 (528 seats)
- Surface: Grass
- Scoreboard: Yes

Construction
- Opened: 1987; 39 years ago
- Renovated: mid-1990s

Tenants
- Monaghan United (1987–present); Former; Dundalk (2005)

Gortakeegan Stadium (Irish: Gort an Chaocháin) is an Irish association football venue located in Monaghan. It has been the home ground of former League of Ireland club Monaghan United since 1987. The ground has a 528-seater covered stand and an overall capacity of 5,000. Floodlights were added in 1995 and a new stand was officially opened by Mick McCarthy in 1996.

The fourteen acre Gortakeegan complex, which includes four floodlit astro turf pitches, is a designated FAI regional centre.

In 1987, Monaghan United left their previous home at Belgium Park to move into Gortakeegan. In 2000, after Monaghan United secured a sponsorship deal with the building firm Century Homes, the ground became known as Century Homes Park. After Century Homes was acquired by the Kingspan Group in 2005, the ground became known as Kingspan Century Park. When the sponsorship deal ended, the ground reverted to its original name.

During the 2005 season, while Oriel Park was being redeveloped, Dundalk played many of their home games at Gortakeegan.

Monaghan United underage also play their games at Gortakeegan and its facilities.
