= 1986–87 League of Ireland Premier Division =

League of Ireland Premier Division
- Season: 1986–87
- Champions: Shamrock Rovers (14th title)
- Relegated: Home Farm; Athlone Town
- European Cup: Shamrock Rovers
- UEFA Cup: Bohemians
- UEFA Cup Winners' Cup: Dundalk F.C.
- Top goalscorer: Mick Byrne:12 (Shamrock Rovers)

The 1986–87 League of Ireland Premier Division was the second season of the League of Ireland Premier Division. The Premier Division was made up of 12 teams.

Shamrock Rovers F.C. won the championship, their 14th title.

== Teams ==
The Premier Division was contested by 12 teams, the top 10 teams for the prior season and two promoted teams. The promoted teams were Bray Wanderers and Sligo Rovers. They replaced Shelbourne and University College Dublin who were relegated to the First Division.

=== Stadia and locations ===
Locations of Premier Division teams

Team	Hometown/Suburb	Stadium
Athlone Town	Athlone	St Mel's Park
Bray Wanderers	Bray	Carlisle Grounds
Bohemians	Phibsborough	Dalymount Park
Cork City	Cork	Turners Cross
Dundalk	Dundalk	Oriel Park
Galway United	Galway	Terryland Park
Home Farm	Drumcondra, Dublin	Tolka Park
Limerick City	Limerick	Jackman Park
Shamrock Rovers	Milltown, Dublin	Glenmalure Park
Sligo Rovers	Sligo	The Showgrounds
St Patrick's Athletic	Inchicore	Richmond Park
Waterford United	Waterford	Kilcohan Park

== Final Table ==
Pos	Team	Pld	W	D	L	GF	GA	GD	Pts	Qualification or relegation
1	Shamrock Rovers (C)	22	18	3	1	51	16	+35	39	Qualification to 1987–88 European Cup
2	Dundalk	22	12	6	4	40	21	+19	30	Qualification to 1987–88 European Cup Winners' Cup (Note: Dundalk qualified for the 1987–88 European Cup Winners' Cup after reaching the 1986–87 FAI Cup final.)
3	Bohemians	22	11	7	4	32	23	+9	29	Qualification to 1987–88 UEFA Cup
4	Waterford United	22	12	4	6	42	24	+18	28	
5	St Patrick's Athletic	22	7	9	6	22	21	+1	23	
6	Galway United	22	8	6	8	25	25	0	22	
7	Cork City	22	7	4	11	30	34	−4	18	
8	Bray Wanderers	22	6	5	11	25	33	−8	17	
9	Limerick City	22	7	3	12	24	38	−14	17	
10	Sligo Rovers	22	6	5	11	23	38	−15	17	
11	Home Farm (R)	22	6	1	15	24	48	−24	13	Relegation to League of Ireland First Division
12	Athlone Town (R)	22	3	5	14	18	35	−17	11	Relegation to League of Ireland First Division

Source: www.rsssf.com
(C) Champions; (R) Relegated

== Results ==
Home \ Away	ATH	BOH	BRW	COR	DUN	GAL	HOM	LIM	SHM	SLI	StP	WAT
Athlone Town	—	0–1	2–1	3–1	1–1	0–0	1–2	1–2	0–2	0–1	2–3	0–0
Bohemians	2–1	—	2–0	2–1	2–2	5–3	3–1	1–0	1–1	2–1	0–1	1–3
Bray Wanderers	2–2	1–3	—	1–0	0–1	1–1	2–3	3–2	1–3	2–1	0–0	3–0
Cork City	3–1	1–1	0–1	—	1–2	0–1	3–2	1–2	1–2	3–2	2–1	1–2
Dundalk	1–0	0–0	1–0	3–0	—	2–3	4–0	2–1	2–0	2–0	0–0	1–2
Galway United	2–0	0–0	2–1	1–1	1–2	—	2–1	0–0	0–1	1–2	2–1	0–0
Home Farm	0–1	1–2	2–1	1–4	2–1	1–3	—	0–1	1–3	1–3	1–0	1–5
Limerick City	3–1	0–1	1–3	1–3	2–2	1–0	1–0	—	0–3	0–1	2–1	2–4
Shamrock Rovers	1–0	3–2	4–1	2–0	5–0	3–1	3–0	2–1	—	4–1	1–1	2–1
Sligo Rovers	1–1	0–0	1–1	0–0	1–8	2–1	1–2	2–1	1–3	—	0–2	2–2
St Patrick's Athletic	1–0	1–1	0–0	2–2	0–0	1–0	1–1	1–1	1–3	1–0	—	2–1
Waterford United	5–1	2–0	2–0	1–2	0–3	0–1	3–1	6–0	0–0	1–0	2–1	—

Legend: Blue = home team win; Yellow = draw; Red = away team win.

== See also ==
- 1986–87 League of Ireland First Division
