= 1993–94 League of Ireland Premier Division =

League of Ireland Premier Division season

League of Ireland Premier Division
- Season: 1993–94
- Champions: Shamrock Rovers (15th title)
- Relegated: Limerick F.C. Drogheda United
- UEFA Cup: Shamrock Rovers; Cork City
- UEFA Cup Winners' Cup: Sligo Rovers (Note: Sligo Rovers who played in the First Division qualified for the 1994–95 European Cup Winners' Cup after winning the 1993–94 FAI Cup final.)
- Top goalscorer: Stephen Geoghegan:23 (Shamrock Rovers)

The 1993–94 League of Ireland Premier Division was the 9th season of the League of Ireland Premier Division. The division was made up of 12 teams. Shamrock Rovers won the title.

== Regular season ==
The regular season initially saw the 12 teams use a traditional round-robin format with each team playing 22 games on a home and away basis. The division was then split into two groups, a top six and a bottom six. After the split, the six teams played the other teams in their group in a second series of 10 games again using a round-robin format.

=== Final Table ===
Pos	Team	Pld	W	D	L	GF	GA	GD	Pts	Qualification or relegation
1	Shamrock Rovers (C)	32	21	3	8	62	30	+32	66	Qualification to UEFA Cup preliminary round
2	Cork City	32	17	8	7	60	36	+24	59	Qualification to UEFA Cup preliminary round
3	Galway United	32	14	8	10	47	42	+5	50	
4	Derry City	32	12	10	10	37	35	+2	46	
5	Shelbourne	32	11	10	11	42	42	0	43	
6	Bohemians	32	11	8	13	34	35	−1	41	
7	Monaghan United	32	13	8	11	41	38	+3	47	
8	Dundalk	32	10	13	9	37	27	+10	43	
9	St Patrick's Athletic	32	9	12	11	32	38	−6	39	
10	Cobh Ramblers (O)	32	8	8	16	31	41	−10	32	Qualification to Relegation play-off
11	Limerick (R)	32	6	11	15	23	50	−27	29	Relegation to League of Ireland First Division
12	Drogheda United (R)	32	7	7	18	26	58	−32	28	Relegation to League of Ireland First Division

Source: www.rsssf.com
(C) Champions; (O) Play-off winners; (R) Relegated

=== Results ===
==== Matches 1–22 ====
Home \ Away	BOH	COB	COR	DER	DRO	DUN	GAL	LIM	MON	SHM	SHE	StP
Bohemians	—	2–0	3–4	2–0	0–1	1–0	3–0	1–0	0–0	2–0	1–0	0–0
Cobh Ramblers	0–0	—	2–1	1–3	1–2	0–2	0–2	0–0	2–0	1–3	1–1	0–1
Cork City	2–0	2–0	—	1–0	1–1	0–1	1–2	3–0	1–0	2–2	1–1	1–1
Derry City	3–0	2–0	0–1	—	1–1	1–4	0–0	0–0	1–0	0–0	1–4	2–0
Drogheda United	0–4	1–3	0–5	0–1	—	0–3	1–4	0–2	1–4	2–1	2–2	1–1
Dundalk	1–1	0–2	2–2	2–2	0–1	—	0–0	0–0	1–3	1–2	5–1	0–2
Galway United	1–1	4–0	0–0	2–1	2–0	0–0	—	1–2	1–0	0–5	1–1	1–2
Limerick	0–0	1–5	1–7	0–1	1–1	0–1	0–3	—	2–3	0–2	0–0	2–1
Monaghan United	1–0	2–1	2–1	1–1	1–0	1–0	3–1	0–0	—	0–1	4–5	1–2
Shamrock Rovers	2–1	3–0	3–0	0–1	2–0	0–0	3–1	7–3	2–1	—	2–0	2–0
Shelbourne	2–1	1–0	0–1	2–0	1–0	1–2	1–1	3–0	3–0	1–0	—	1–0
St Patrick's Athletic	0–0	1–1	3–4	0–0	4–1	0–0	2–3	1–1	1–0	0–1	2–2	—

Legend: Blue = home team win; Yellow = draw; Red = away team win.

==== Matches 23–32 ====
===== Top Six =====
Home \ Away	BOH	COR	DER	GAL	SHM	SHE
Bohemians	—	1–1	1–3	0–1	1–2	2–0
Cork City	3–1	—	4–2	2–0	2–1	3–1
Derry City	4–0	3–2	—	1–1	1–0	0–0
Galway United	3–1	0–1	2–1	—	2–3	2–5
Shamrock Rovers	1–2	2–0	3–0	2–5	—	2–1
Shelbourne	0–2	1–1	1–1	0–1	0–3	—

Legend: Blue = home team win; Yellow = draw; Red = away team win.

===== Bottom Six =====
Home \ Away	COB	DRO	DUN	LIM	MON	StP
Cobh Ramblers	—	1–0	1–1	1–0	1–1	0–1
Drogheda United	2–1	—	0–2	0–0	1–1	2–0
Dundalk	0–0	4–0	—	2–0	1–1	0–2
Limerick	0–0	1–0	2–1	—	2–1	2–2
Monaghan United	2–1	3–2	1–1	2–1	—	0–0
St Patrick's Athletic	0–5	1–3	0–0	1–0	1–2	—

Legend: Blue = home team win; Yellow = draw; Red = away team win.

== Promotion/relegation play-off ==
Cobh Ramblers F.C. who finished in tenth place played off against Finn Harps F.C., the third placed team from the 1993–94 League of Ireland First Division.

=== 1st leg ===
9 April 1994	Finn Harps F.C.	1–0	Cobh Ramblers F.C.

=== 2nd leg ===
16 April 1994	Cobh Ramblers F.C.	3–0	Finn Harps F.C.

Cobh Ramblers F.C. won 3–1 on aggregate and retain their place in the Premier Division

== See also ==
- 1993–94 League of Ireland First Division
