= Monaghan United F.C. =

- Full name: Monaghan United Football Club
- Nickname: The Magic Mons
- Founded: 1979; 47 years ago
- Ground: Gortakeegan
- Capacity: 5,000 (800 seats)
- Chairman: Ronan Callan
- Manager: Ronan Callan
- League: North East Football League; Division 2
- 2025: North East Football League; Division 3, 1st out of 12 (promoted)
- Website: monaghanunitedfc.com
Home colours	Away colours

Monaghan United F.C. is an Irish football club based in Monaghan currently playing in Division 2 of the North East Football League. The club joined the League of Ireland in 1983 and subsequently went on to play in the B Division, the First Division and the Premier Division. They resigned from the league midway through the 2012 season.

The club continued to field a women's team in the Dublin Women's Soccer League and, together with the Cavan Monaghan Underage League, they entered a combined team in the League of Ireland U13, U15, U17 and U19 Divisions, until 2020, whereupon the partnership was ended. The CMUL continued to field teams in the national underage leagues. In 2019 the club re-entered men's football, joining the Monaghan Cavan League. In 2025 the club joined the North East Football League, starting in Division 3.

== History ==
Monaghan United were founded in 1979. Among the club's founding members were Eddie Murray – who later joined the board of directors at the Football Association of Ireland — and Sean McCaffrey. McCaffrey was also the manager of the club when they joined the League of Ireland B Division in 1983–84.

=== League of Ireland ===
Chart of yearly table positions for Monaghan United in League of Ireland

In 1985–86 Monaghan United became founder members of the League of Ireland First Division. United played eight seasons in the First Division before winning their first promotion. After finishing third in 1992–93 they became the first League of Ireland club to gain promotion via a promotion/relegation play off. They defeated Waterford United 5–2 on aggregate and were subsequently promoted to the 1993–94 Premier Division. They survived just two seasons in the Premier Division before being relegated at the end of the 1994–95 season. Monaghan United gained promotion to the Premier Division for a second time in 2000–01 after finishing second to Dundalk. This time their stay in the Premier Division last just one season. After managing to win just two league games, they finished last and were relegated following the conclusion of the 2001–02 season. Monaghan United reached the final of the 2010 League of Ireland Cup but lost 1–0 in the final to Sligo Rovers. They also finished third in the 2010 First Division and qualified for the promotion/relegation play off. They subsequently beat Waterford United before losing to Bray Wanderers on penalties. In 2011, under the management of Roddy Collins, Monaghan United again qualified for the promotion/relegation play off. This time they won promotion after beating Galway United 5–1 on aggregate. However, midway through the 2012 season, Monaghan United withdrew from the league for "mainly but not only financial" reasons.

Statistics

Stat	Opponent	Score	Season	Date
Record Win	Longford Town	5–0	1992–93	4 October 1992
	Kildare County	6–1	2009	16 October 2009
	Salthill Devon	6–1	2010	10 April 2010
Record Defeat	Galway United	0–8	2001–02	26 October 2001

=== Monaghan Cavan League ===
The club continued to field a women's team in the Dublin Women's Soccer League and, together with the Cavan Monaghan Underage League (CMUL), entered a combined team for the League of Ireland under-13, under-15, under-17 and under-19 underage divisions. In 2019, Monaghan United formed a senior team to compete in the Monaghan Cavan League (MCL), entering at the First Division level.

They finished off their 2019–20 debut season by winning the Sean Woods Cup and Jimmy Smith Shield Cup in September 2020, beating Glaslough Villa in both finals. That same year, the partnership with the CMUL ended, although the CMUL continued to field teams in the national underage leagues.

=== Ulster Senior League ===
In April 2021, Monaghan United announced they would join the Ulster Senior League (USL) for the 2021–22 season. This made them the first club from Monaghan or Cavan to do so. However, they withdrew from the league after one season to return to the Monaghan Cavan League.

=== North East Football League ===
Ahead of the 2025 summer season, Monaghan United joined Monaghan Town in leaving the Monaghan Cavan League for the North East Football League (NEFL). They joined the league at Division 3 level. In their first season, they won the league by finishing top, earning promotion to Division 2.

=== Women's team ===
==== Dublin Women's Soccer League ====
Monaghan United formed a ladies football team in 2006. They won Division Four of the Dublin Women's Soccer League in their first season and were promoted to Division Two. In 2007 they again won the league along with the Leinster Junior Cup. In 2008 they won the DWSL Intermediate Cup after defeating Santry 3–1 in the final. In 2012 they reached the semi-finals of the WFAI Intermediate Cup.

== Grounds ==
Monaghan United originally played their home games at Belgium Park which served as their home ground between 1979 and 1988. Since 1988 they have played at Gortakeegan, the first ever game being against Drogheda United in the 1988-89 League Cup.

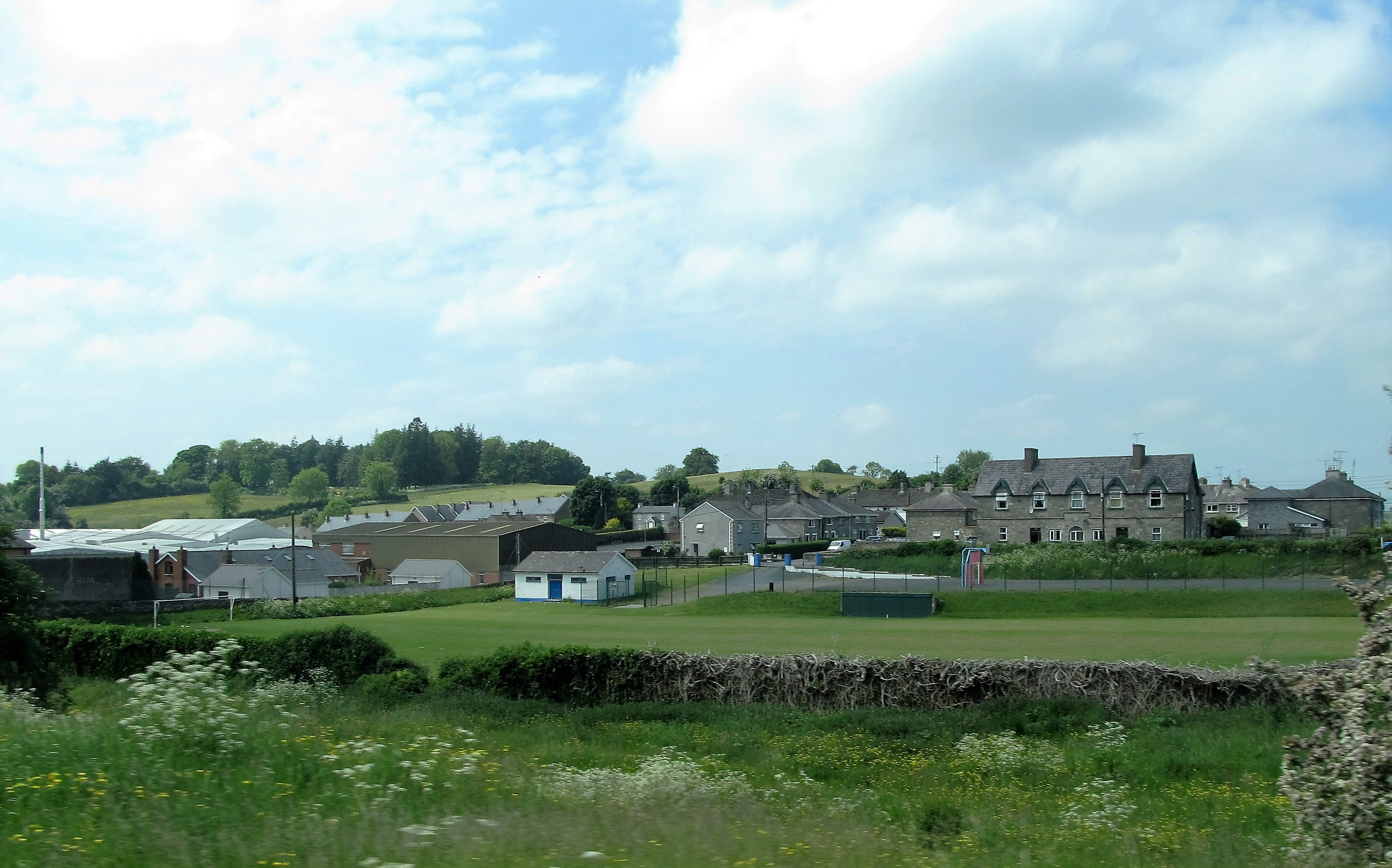
Belgium Park, the former ground of Monaghan United

== Honours ==
Men

- League of Ireland Cup
  - Runners Up: 2010: 1
- League of Ireland First Division
  - Runners Up: 2000–01: 1
- NEFL Division 3
  - Winners: 2025: 1
- MCL Andy Capaldi Cup
  - Winners: 2022-23: 1
- MCL Sean Woods Cup
  - Winners: 2019-20: 1
- MCL Jimmy Smith Shield
  - Winners: 2019-20: 1

Women

- DWSL Intermediate Cup
  - Winners: 2008: 1

== Notable former players ==
=== Internationals ===
Republic of Ireland internationals

- (Republic of Ireland) Jonathan Douglas

League of Ireland XI representatives

- (Republic of Ireland) Mick Byrne
- (Republic of Ireland) John Coady
- (Republic of Ireland) Joe Hanrahan
- (Republic of Ireland) Brian Mooney

Republic of Ireland B internationals

- (Republic of Ireland) Brian Mooney

Republic of Ireland U23 internationals

- (Republic of Ireland) Derek McGrath
- (Republic of Ireland) Brian Mooney
- (Republic of Ireland) Stephen Rice

Republic of Ireland U21 internationals

- (Republic of Ireland) Martin Bayly
- (Republic of Ireland) Ritchie Bayly
- (Republic of Ireland) Karl Bermingham
- (Republic of Ireland) Mark Connolly
- (Republic of Ireland) Tommy Fitzgerald
- (Republic of Ireland) Keith Foy
- (Republic of Ireland) James Hand
- (Republic of Ireland) Joe Hanrahan
- (Republic of Ireland) Stephen Maher
- (Republic of Ireland) Aaron McCarey
- (Republic of Ireland) Derek McGrath

Republic of Ireland U19 internationals

- (Republic of Ireland) Robert Bayly
- (Republic of Ireland) Ricky McEvoy

Republic of Ireland U17 internationals

- (Republic of Ireland) David Freeman
- (Republic of Ireland) John Lester
- (Republic of Ireland) Ger Robinson

Other Internationals

- (Barbados) Alvin Rouse

=== Goal scorers ===
First Division Top Scorer

Season	Player	Goals
1990–91	(Republic of Ireland) Jim Barr	12
1992–93	(Republic of Ireland) Mick Byrne	15
1999–00	(Republic of Ireland) Andrew Myler	17

Most League Goals in a Season

Season	Player	Goals
1999–00	(Republic of Ireland) Andrew Myler	17
2009	(Republic of Ireland) Karl Bermingham	17

Most League Goals

Years	Player	Goals
2001–03	(Republic of Ireland) Trevor Vaughan	28

=== Others ===
(Republic of Ireland) Paddy Andrews – All-Ireland football winner with Dublin

== Managers ==
- (Republic of Ireland) Sean McCaffrey (1979–?)
- (Republic of Ireland) Bobby Browne (1999–2003)
- (Republic of Ireland) Mick Cooke (2003–11)
- (Republic of Ireland) Roddy Collins (2011–12)
