= League of Ireland Cup =

Association football competition in Republic of Ireland

- Organiser(s): Football Association of Ireland; League of Ireland
- Founded: 1973
- Region: (Republic of Ireland) Ireland
- Teams: 24
- Current champions: Dundalk (7th Title) (2019)
- Most championships: (Northern Ireland) Derry City (11 titles)
- 2020

The League of Ireland Cup, also referred to in Ireland as the 'League Cup', was an annual knockout competition in men's football in Ireland. It was contested by League of Ireland clubs and invited clubs from the lower levels of the Irish football league system. It has been sponsored by Electronic Arts and branded the EA Sports Cup since 2009.

The competition began in 1973–74, replacing the League of Ireland Shield and the Dublin City Cup. It has had several formats since its inception and has been a knock-out competition since 2005. As there was no European qualification for winners of the League of Ireland Cup, it had a lower status than the FAI Cup and was therefore seen as the third most important trophy in the Irish playing season.

The competition was not held in 2020 and 2021 as a result of delays and restrictions caused by the COVID-19 pandemic, and has yet to resume being held as of 2026.

== List of League Cup finals ==
Key to the list of finals
†	Score on aggregate after 2 legs
	Match was won on a penalty shootout

Season	Winner	Score	Runner-up	Venue	Attendance
1973–74	Waterford	2–1	Finn Harps		
1974–75	Bohemians	3–2 ^{†}	Finn Harps		
1975–76	Limerick	4–1 ^{†}	Sligo Rovers		
1976–77	Shamrock Rovers	1–0	Sligo Rovers		
1977–78	Dundalk	4–4 ^{†}	Cork Alberts		
1978–79	Bohemians	2–0	Shamrock Rovers		
1979–80	Athlone Town	4–2	St. Patrick's Athletic		
1980–81	Dundalk	0–0 ^{†}	Galway Rovers		
1981–82	Athlone Town	1–0	Shamrock Rovers		
1982–83	Athlone Town	2–1	Dundalk		
1983–84	Drogheda United	3–1	Athlone Town		
1984–85	Waterford United	2–1	Finn Harps		
1985–86	Galway United	2–0	Dundalk		
1986–87	Dundalk	1–0	Shamrock Rovers		
1987–88	Cork City	1–0	Shamrock Rovers		
1988–89	Derry City	4–0	Dundalk		
1989–90	Dundalk	1–1	Derry City		
1990–91	Derry City	2–0	Limerick City	Brandywell	
1991–92	Derry City	1–0	Bohemians	Dalymount Park	
1992–93	Limerick F.C.	2–0	St. Patrick's Athletic	Harold's Cross Stadium	
1993–94	Derry City	1–0 ^{†}	Shelbourne	Brandywell/Tolka Park	
1994–95	Cork City	2–1 ^{†}	Dundalk		
1995–96	Shelbourne	2–2 ^{†}	Sligo Rovers	The Showgrounds/Tolka Park	
1996–97	Galway United	4–2 ^{†}	Cork City	Turners Cross, Cork	
1997–98	Sligo Rovers	1–0 ^{†}	Shelbourne	The Showgrounds/Tolka Park	
1998–99	Cork City	2–1 ^{†}	Shamrock Rovers		
1999–2000	Derry City	5–2 ^{†}	Athlone Town		
2000–01	St. Patrick's Athletic	5–3 ^{†}	UCD		
2001–02	Limerick F.C.	2–2 ^{†}	Derry City		
2002–03	No Competition due to change in seasons				
2003	St. Patrick's Athletic	1–0	Longford Town	Richmond Park, Dublin	
2004	Longford Town	2–1	Bohemians	Flancare Park, Longford	
2005	Derry City	2–1	UCD	Belfield Park	2,150
2006	Derry City	0–0	Shelbourne	Brandywell Stadium, Derry	
2007	Derry City	1–0	Bohemians	Brandywell Stadium, Derry	7,700
2008	Derry City	6–1	Wexford Youths	Ferrycarrig Park, Crossabeg	3,500
2009	Bohemians	3–1	Waterford United	Waterford Regional Sports Centre, Waterford	4,000
2010	Sligo Rovers	1–0	Monaghan United	Showgrounds, Sligo	3,000
2011	Derry City	1–0	Cork City	Turner's Cross, Cork	4,164
2012	Drogheda United	3–1	Shamrock Rovers	Tallaght Stadium, Dublin	3,120
2013	Shamrock Rovers	2–0	Drogheda United	Tallaght Stadium, Dublin	3,820
2014	Dundalk	3–2	Shamrock Rovers	Oriel Park, Dundalk	3,500
2015	St Patrick's Athletic	0–0	Galway United	Eamonn Deacy Park, Galway	3,662
2016	St Patrick's Athletic	4–1	Limerick F.C.	Markets Field, Limerick	4,362
2017	Dundalk	3–0	Shamrock Rovers	Tallaght Stadium, Dublin	4,102
2018	Derry City	3–1	Cobh Ramblers	Brandywell Stadium, Derry	3,500 (est)
2019	Dundalk	2–2	Derry City	Brandywell Stadium, Derry	3,500 (est)
2020	Abandoned due to COVID-19 pandemic in the Republic of Ireland				

== Performance by club ==
Club	Winners	Runners-up	Winning years	Years runners up
Derry City	11	3	1988–89, 1990–91, 1991–92, 1993–94, 1999–2000, 2005, 2006, 2007, 2008, 2011, 2018	1989–90, 2001–02, 2019
Dundalk	7	4	1977–78, 1980–81, 1986–87, 1989–90, 2014, 2017, 2019	1982–83, 1985–86, 1988–89, 1994–95
St. Patrick's Athletic	4	2	2000–01, 2003, 2015, 2016	1979–80, 1992–93
Bohemians	3	3	1974–75, 1978–79, 2009	1991–92, 2004, 2007
Athlone Town	3	2	1979–80, 1981–82, 1982–83	1983–84, 1999–2000
Cork City	3	2	1987–88, 1994–95, 1998–99	1996–97, 2011
Limerick ^{1}	3	2	1975–76, 1992–93, 2001–02	1990–91, 2016
Shamrock Rovers	2	8	1976–77, 2013	1978–79, 1981–82, 1986–87, 1987–88, 1998–99, 2012, 2014, 2017
Sligo Rovers	2	3	1997–98, 2010	1975–76, 1976–77, 1995–96
Galway United ^{2}	2	2	1985–86, 1996–97	1980–81, 2015
Waterford United ^{3}	2	1	1973–74, 1984–85	2009
Drogheda United	2	1	1983–84, 2012	2013
Shelbourne	1	3	1995–96	1993–94, 1997–98, 2006
Longford Town	1	1	2004	2003
Finn Harps	-	3	-	1973–74, 1974–75, 1984–85
UCD	-	2	-	2000–01, 2005
Cork Alberts	-	1	-	1977–78
Wexford Youths	-	1	-	2008
Monaghan United	-	1	-	2010
Cobh Ramblers	-	1	-	2018

- ^{1} Includes results for Limerick and Limerick City.
- ^{2} Includes results for Galway Rovers.
- ^{3} Includes results for Waterford FC.

== Sponsors ==
Bass League Cup: 1975–76 – 1978–79

Opel League Cup: 1986–87 – 1989–90

Bord Gáis League Cup: 1990–91 – 1995–96

Harp Lager League Cup: 1996–97 – 1998–99

Eircom League Cup: 1999–2000 – 2008

EA Sports Cup: 2009 –

== Television coverage ==
The Final has been broadcast live since 2005, first by Setanta Sports, then since 2016 by its successor channel Eir Sport

== See also ==
- League of Ireland
- League of Ireland Shield
- FAI Cup
