= Carl Humphries =

Irish football player

Personal information
- Place of birth: Cork, Ireland
- Position: Forward

Youth career
- West Ham

Senior career*
Years	Team	Apps	(Gls)
1970–1971	Cork Celtic		
1971–1973	Waterford		
1973–1974	Cork Hibernians		
1974–1976	Athlone Town		
1976	St. Louis Stars	11	(3)
1977–1979	Cork Celtic		
1980–1981	Galway Rovers		

Managerial career
- c. 1992: Everton A.F.C. (co-manager)
- * Club domestic league appearances and goals

Carl Humphries is an Irish former association football player who played as a forward. In 2001, the Irish Independent newspaper declared Humphries to be "one of the greatest-ever" to play in the League of Ireland.

== Early career ==
As a teenager, Humphries was on the books at both West Ham United in the English First Division for two years. He returned to Cork in 1970 and signed for local club Cork Celtic in the League of Ireland. Humphries scored 7 goals for Celtic in the 1970–71 season. He signed for Waterford FC in 1971 and was a member of the side that won the 1971–72 League of Ireland. His goal scoring proved crucial to the Blues as he would score Waterford's first in an away game against title rivals Cork Hibernians on the final day of the season at Flower Lodge. 26,000 people witnessed Hibs go 2–0 up before Humphries' 79th-minute strike. Team-mates Johnny Matthews and Alfie Hale then scored in a dramatic 3–2 win that clinched Waterford's fifth title in seven years. Humphries and Waterford would win another League Title the following season, Waterford's 6th and his 2nd.

== Cork Hibernians and Athlone Town ==
Humphries moved to Cork Hibernians in halfway through the 1972–73 League of Ireland season. With Hibs he scored in the replayed final of the 1972–73 FAI Cup at Flower Lodge, earning Hibernians a 1–0 win. This win earned Cork a place in the 1973–74 European Cup Winners' Cup. In the First Round, Hibernians met Czechoslovak outfit Banik Ostrava. Humphries started the opening game, away in Ostrava as Cork lost 1–0 on 13 September 1973. On 3 October 1973, Humphries scored his first goal in continental football, netting a consolation goal in the 67th minute for the home side as Hibs lost 2–1 at Flower Lodge, exiting the competition.

Humphries signed for Athlone Town for the 1974–75 season. The previous season the Town had finished in 12th, but with Humphries added to their books they finished in a magnificent 2nd place. At the time, Humphries was still playing with his old club Cork Celtic in between games for Athlone. This earned them a place in the 1975–76 UEFA Cup, the first time they had ever qualified for European competition. Their first-round game was against Norwegian side Vålerenga who they beat 4–2 on aggregate. Humphries would play in both games and picked up a yellow card in the second-leg at the Bislett Stadion. In the second-round, Athlone were drawn against Italian giants AC Milan drawing 0–0 in the first leg at St. Mel's Park setting a record attendance of 9,000 before losing the second leg at the San Siro 3–0. Humphries would start both games for Athlone.

In October 1975, Humphries was named as the Soccer Writers' Association of Ireland (SWAI) Player of the Month.

== St. Louis Stars ==
Humphries was part of the roster of the North American Soccer League (NASL) team St. Louis Stars, wearing the number 17 shirt. He played one season with the Stars in the 1976 NASL season, making 11 appearances and registering three goals and one assist. The Stars would finish last in the Pacific Conference

== Later career ==
Humphries returned to Ireland in 1977 to re-sign with boyhood club Cork Celtic. In 1980 he signed for Galway Rovers. In 1980–81 Rovers reached the final of the League of Ireland Cup, but lost on penalties to Dundalk. In the 1981–82 season, Galway Rovers changed their name to Galway United.

Humphries worked in Cork docks while playing in the League of Ireland and bred and trained greyhounds. He later managed Munster Senior League side Everton team along with Jerry Myers and was defeated in the 1992 Munster Senior Cup final by Cork City.

In March 2000, his 16-year-old son, Carl Jr., was banned from football for ten years following an incident in a Munster Senior League match between Castleview A.F.C. and Ballincollig A.F.C. the previous December. He later received a red card for life. His son Carl Jr was jailed for eight years in 2022 for possession of a large amount of cannabis.

== Honours ==
Waterford

- League of Ireland: 1971–72

Cork Hibernians

- FAI Cup: 1972–73
