= Frankie Connolly =

Irish footballer (1944–2023)

Personal information
- Full name: Francis Connolly
- Date of birth: 1944
- Place of birth: Cork, Ireland
- Date of death: 20 November 2023 (aged 78)
- Place of death: Cork, Ireland
- Position: Full-back

Youth career
- Ringmahon Rangers

Senior career*
Years	Team	Apps	(Gls)
1962–1975	Cork Hibernians	314	(29)
1964–1966	→ Ringmahon Rangers		
1977–1978	Cork Alberts		
- * Club domestic league appearances and goals

Francis Connolly (1944 – 20 November 2023) was an Irish footballer who played as a full-back. His teams included Ringmahon Rangers, Cork Hibernians and Cork Alberts.

== Career ==
Connolly spent his early boyhood playing days with Ringmahon Rangers. He was capped against England and Wales in Schoolboys International, before spending a month on trial with West Bromwich Albion. Connolly signed for Cork Hibernians in 1962 and made his debut against Bohemians as a 17-year-old. He was also chosen for home and away Youth Internationals against Northern Ireland.

After two seasons in the League of Ireland, Connolly returned to Ringmahon Rangers in 1964 and won to back-to-back Munster Senior League titles in 1964 and 1965. He returned to Cork Hibs in 1966 and scored a hat-trick against Cork Celtic in his second game back. Connolly won his first major trophy in 1970 when Hibs won the League of Ireland Shield. A year later he won the League of Ireland title after defeating Shamrock Rovers in a play-off at Dalymount Park. There was disappointment for Connolly the following year when, despite playing 24 matches, he missed out on the FAI Cup final victory over Waterford.

Connolly claimed an FAI Cup medal in 1973 after Hibs beat Shelbourne in a replay. Injuries restricted his participation in Hibs final years and he rejoined Ringmahon Rangers for a period. Connolly's final appearance in a Hibs shirt was in the FAI Cup quarter-final defeat by Shelbourne in 1975. He made a comeback with Albert Rovers who replaced Hibs in the League of Ireland in 1977.

== Death ==
Connolly died on 20 November 2023, at the age of 78.

== Honours ==
Ringmahon Rangers

- Munster Senior League: 1964–65, 1965–66

Cork Hibernians

- League of Ireland: 1970–71
- FAI Cup: 1972–73
- League of Ireland Shield: 1969–70, 1972–73
- Blaxnit Cup: 1971–72
