= 1973–74 League of Ireland =

League of Ireland
- Season: 1973–74
- Champions: Cork Celtic (1st title)

Below are the statistics of League of Ireland in the 1973/1974 season.

== Overview ==
It was contested by 14 teams, and Cork Celtic won the championship.

== Final classification ==
Pos	Team	Pld	W	D	L	GF	GA	GD	Pts	Qualification or relegation
1	Cork Celtic (C)	26	18	6	2	50	25	+25	42	Qualification to European Cup first round
2	Bohemian F.C.	26	18	2	6	56	18	+38	38	Qualification to UEFA Cup first round
3	Cork Hibernians F.C.	26	16	6	4	47	23	+24	38	
4	Finn Harps F.C.	26	15	5	6	51	27	+24	35	Qualification to Cup Winners' Cup first round
5	Waterford F.C.	26	11	7	8	55	36	+19	29	
6	Dundalk F.C.	26	12	4	10	41	36	+5	28	
7	Shamrock Rovers F.C.	26	11	5	10	31	33	−2	27	
8	St Patrick's Athletic F.C.	26	10	2	14	29	45	−16	22	
9	Limerick F.C.	26	7	6	13	32	45	−13	20	
10	Home Farm F.C.	26	6	8	12	19	40	−21	20	
11	Drogheda F.C.	26	7	5	14	39	59	−20	19	
12	Athlone Town A.F.C.	26	8	3	15	25	38	−13	19	
13	Sligo Rovers F.C.	26	6	2	18	28	51	−23	14	
14	Shelbourne F.C.	26	4	5	17	31	58	−27	13	

Source: www.rsssf.com
(C) Champions

== Results ==
Home \ Away	ATH	BOH	CCF	CHF	DRO	DUN	FHA	HOM	LIM	SHM	SHE	SLI	StP	WAT
Athlone Town	—	1–2	0–1	0–1	1–3	0–2	1–3	2–0	4–1	1–2	2–0	3–0	1–0	0–2
Bohemians	2–3	—	7–0	0–2	3–1	1–0	1–0	4–0	3–0	0–1	2–0	2–1	7–0	1–0
Cork Celtic	1–0	0–0	—	1–3	6–0	1–0	1–1	2–0	2–1	4–0	2–1	1–1	3–0	1–0
Cork Hibernians	2–0	3–4	1–2	—	2–2	2–1	0–0	3–0	2–1	3–1	3–0	3–2	2–0	1–1
Drogheda	3–1	0–5	2–3	0–4	—	3–1	2–3	1–1	0–1	2–1	1–1	2–3	2–3	2–2
Dundalk	1–1	1–0	1–1	2–3	3–0	—	1–1	0–1	2–1	1–3	3–1	3–0	2–1	3–2
Finn Harps	3–1	2–1	1–2	0–0	3–0	0–1	—	7–1	0–1	1–1	3–2	3–2	4–0	2–4
Home Farm	1–0	1–0	0–1	0–0	2–0	1–2	1–3	—	1–0	0–0	0–2	2–0	0–2	2–2
Limerick	0–0	0–2	0–0	2–1	2–3	4–1	0–3	1–1	—	1–0	1–1	2–3	4–2	0–4
Shamrock Rovers	0–0	0–1	1–1	2–0	2–1	2–1	0–2	2–1	2–1	—	3–1	1–0	0–0	3–5
Shelbourne	1–2	0–2	1–3	1–1	1–3	0–3	1–2	2–2	3–3	4–1	—	2–1	1–3	1–4
Sligo Rovers	0–1	0–3	1–3	1–2	2–1	3–4	0–1	3–0	1–1	1–0	0–2	—	1–2	1–3
St Patrick's Athletic	1–0	0–1	1–2	0–2	1–3	3–1	2–1	1–1	2–3	1–0	3–2	0–1	—	0–1
Waterford	6–0	2–2	2–6	0–1	2–2	1–1	1–2	0–0	2–1	0–3	5–0	4–0	0–1	—

Legend: Blue = home team win; Yellow = draw; Red = away team win.

== Top scorers ==
Rank	Player	Club	Goals
1	Terry Flanagan	Bohemians	18
1	Turlough O'Connor	Bohemians	18
3	Brendan Bradley	Finn Harps	12
3	Donal Murphy	Shamrock Rovers	12
3	Frank O'Neill	Cork Celtic	12
6	Dinny Allen	Cork Hibernians	11
7	Alfie Hale	Waterford (7); Cork Celtic (3)	10
7	Johnny Matthews	Waterford	10
9	Gerry Brammeld	Drogheda	9
9	Barry Notley	Cork Celtic	9
