= 1978–79 League of Ireland =

League of Ireland
- Season: 1978–79
- Champions: Dundalk (5th title)
- Top goalscorer: John Delamere, Sligo Rovers (2); Shelbourne (15) 17 goals

Below are the statistics of League of Ireland in the 1978–79 season.

== Overview ==
It was contested by 16 teams, and Dundalk F.C. won the championship.

== Final classification ==
Pos	Team	Pld	W	D	L	GF	GA	GD	Pts	Qualification or relegation
1	Dundalk (C)	30	19	7	4	57	25	+32	45	Qualification to European Cup first round
2	Bohemians	30	18	7	5	53	21	+32	43	Qualification to UEFA Cup first round
3	Drogheda United	30	17	6	7	60	40	+20	42 (Note: After the matches Cork Celtic 0-0 Limerick, Drogheda United 0-1 Finn Harps and Thurles Town 0-1 Cork Celtic, the league awarded 1 point to Limerick from Cork Celtic, 2 points to Drogheda United from Finn Harps and 2 points to Thurles Town from Cork Celtic.)	
4	Waterford	30	17	8	5	48	32	+16	42	Qualification to Cup Winners' Cup first round
5	Shamrock Rovers	30	17	3	10	45	25	+20	37	
6	Limerick (Note: Limerick changed their club name to Limerick United for next season.)	30	13	9	8	39	25	+14	36	
7	Athlone Town	30	14	7	9	56	41	+15	35	
8	Finn Harps	30	15	6	9	56	41	+15	34	
9	Home Farm	30	13	7	10	47	33	+14	33	
10	Sligo Rovers	30	9	7	14	35	40	−5	25	
11	Cork Alberts (Note: Cork Alberts changed their club name to Cork United for next season.)	30	7	9	14	35	49	−14	23	
12	Thurles Town	30	8	5	17	35	62	−27	23	
13	Shelbourne	30	6	9	15	41	58	−17	21	
14	St Patrick's Athletic	30	7	6	17	36	62	−26	20	
15	Galway Rovers	30	4	5	21	41	79	−38	13	
16	Cork Celtic (Note: Cork Celtic were expelled from the league at the end of the season.)	30	3	5	22	16	67	−51	8	

Source: www.rsssf.com
(C) Champions
Notes:

U.C.D. were elected to the league for next season.

== Results ==
Home \ Away	ATH	BOH	CAF	CCF	DRO	DUN	FHA	GAL	HOM	LIM	SHM	SHE	SLI	StP	THU	WAT
Athlone Town	—	1–0	2–1	2–0	1–2	2–2	2–0	2–2	2–2	0–1	2–0	4–1	1–3	3–0	6–2	3–1
Bohemians	1–0	—	2–0	6–0	3–3	0–0	2–0	3–1	1–1	1–0	0–1	2–1	2–1	3–0	2–2	1–0
Cork Alberts	0–0	1–2	—	6–1	1–3	1–1	1–3	3–2	1–1	0–1	0–3	2–5	0–0	0–0	1–0	2–2
Cork Celtic	1–2	1–0	1–0	—	0–2	0–3	0–2	2–2	0–2	0–0 (Note: The points from the match between Cork Celtic and Limerick (0–0) have been credited to Limerick.)	0–2	2–2	1–2	0–2	0–1	0–1
Drogheda United	1–1	2–4	5–1	0–0	—	1–0	0–1 (Note: The points of the match between Drogheda United and Finn Harps (0–1) were awarded to Drogheda.)	6–2	2–1	2–1	2–0	3–0	1–1	4–3	3–1	2–2
Dundalk	3–0	1–0	3–0	2–0	1–0	—	1–1	2–1	2–0	2–0	3–2	3–1	1–1	5–1	4–1	0–3
Finn Harps	2–3	1–3	2–0	4–0	0–2	2–1	—	4–1	4–1	2–5	2–1	2–2	1–0	1–1	3–3	3–1
Galway Rovers	0–4	2–6	2–1	2–1	0–1	2–2	2–3	—	1–6	1–4	0–2	4–2	1–2	1–0	2–2	1–1
Home Farm	4–1	2–1	0–1	2–2	4–1	0–1	1–0	2–1	—	2–0	0–0	2–1	2–1	3–0	1–2	0–1
Limerick	1–1	0–0	2–2	5–1	1–1	0–2	0–0	3–1	1–0	—	0–0	1–0	0–1	1–1	2–1	1–1
Shamrock Rover	2–1	0–1	2–3	4–0	2–1	1–2	4–0	3–0	2–1	2–1	—	1–0	4–0	2–0	1–2	0–1
Shelbourne	2–2	0–0	1–1	3–1	1–2	0–3	1–3	2–1	0–2	0–4	0–0	—	1–1	3–1	1–1	2–2
Sligo Rovers	0–1	0–2	1–1	3–0	2–4	1–2	2–1	2–1	0–0	0–1	0–1	1–2	—	2–0	2–0	3–4
St Patrick's Athletic	4–1	0–3	0–3	4–1	1–3	2–2	0–3	3–2	1–1	0–1	1–2	1–4	1–0	—	3–1	3–0
Thurles Town	0–5	0–2	0–1	0–1 (Note: The points of the match Thurles Town and Cork Celtic (0–1) were awarded to Thurles.)	2–1	1–3	0–5	2–1	3–2	0–2	0–1	4–2	2–1	2–2	—	0–1
Waterford	3–1	0–0	2–1	1–0	3–0	1–0	1–1	3–2	0–2	1–0	2–0	2–1	2–2	5–1	1–0	—

Legend: Blue = home team win; Yellow = draw; Red = away team win.

== Top scorers ==
Rank	Player	Club	Goals
1	John Delamere	Sligo Rovers (2); Shelbourne (15)	17
2	Hillary Carlyle	Dundalk	16
3	Turlough O'Connor	Bohemians	15
4	Pat O'Connor	Home Farm	14
5	Gerry Brammeld	Drogheda United	13
5	Jerome Clarke	Drogheda United	13
5	Gary Hulmes	Sligo Rovers	13
5	Mick Leech	Drogheda United	13
9	Derek Carthy	St Patrick's Athletic	12
9	Johnny Matthews	Waterford	12
