= 1975–76 League of Ireland =

League of Ireland
- Season: 1975–76
- Champions: Dundalk (4th title)

Below are the statistics of League of Ireland in the 1975–76 season.

== Overview ==
It was contested by 14 teams, and Dundalk won the championship.

== Final classification ==
Pos	Team	Pld	W	D	L	GF	GA	GD	Pts	Qualification or relegation
1	Dundalk (C)	26	15	10	1	54	26	+28	40	Qualification to European Cup first round
2	Finn Harps	26	15	6	5	57	35	+22	36	Qualification to UEFA Cup first round
3	Waterford	26	13	8	5	54	37	+17	34	
4	Bohemians	26	10	12	4	44	25	+19	32	Qualification to Cup Winners' Cup first round
5	Cork Hibernians (Note: Cork Hibernians resigned from the league at the end of the season.)	26	11	9	6	37	24	+13	31	
6	Drogheda United	26	11	6	9	42	45	−3	28	
7	Athlone Town	26	12	4	10	40	49	−9	28	
8	Cork Celtic	26	11	5	10	41	34	+7	27	
9	Shelbourne	26	7	7	12	42	44	−2	21	
10	Sligo Rovers	26	6	8	12	32	49	−17	20	
11	St Patrick's Athletic	26	7	5	14	31	53	−22	19	
12	Home Farm	26	4	9	13	35	54	−19	17	
13	Limerick	26	6	4	16	37	49	−12	16	
14	Shamrock Rovers	26	4	7	15	27	49	−22	15	

Source: www.rsssf.com
(C) Champions
Notes:

Albert Rovers were elected to the league for next season.

== Results ==
Home \ Away	ATH	BOH	CCF	CHF	DRO	DUN	FHA	HOM	LIM	SHM	SHE	SLI	StP	WAT
Athlone Town	—	1–1	2–1	2–1	3–2	0–1	3–2	4–2	5–5	3–1	2–1	0–2	2–0	0–1
Bohemians	2–0	—	2–2	0–0	2–2	1–1	1–2	3–2	6–2	1–0	3–0	3–1	6–0	2–0
Cork Celtic	1–2	1–0	—	1–1	0–2	2–1	0–2	3–1	2–0	3–1	0–0	3–0	3–1	3–4
Cork Hibernians	5–0	1–2	1–1	—	2–1	1–1	0–2	2–0	2–1	1–1	2–2	3–0	2–0	1–1
Drogheda United	1–0	2–2	2–1	1–1	—	1–2	2–3	1–1	2–1	2–1	1–0	1–0	0–1	2–2
Dundalk	3–0	2–2	3–2	1–0	4–1	—	1–1	2–2	1–0	5–2	4–1	3–2	2–2	1–1
Finn Harps	1–2	2–1	0–3	3–1	7–0	0–2	—	2–1	4–2	2–2	2–1	6–1	1–0	1–1
Home Farm	5–0	1–1	0–1	1–1	0–3	0–0	1–1	—	1–1	1–1	1–5	4–2	1–2	2–4
Limerick	3–0	1–1	2–1	0–1	3–4	1–4	1–3	0–1	—	1–2	2–0	1–2	1–2	2–1
Shamrock Rovers	1–2	1–0	2–2	1–0	2–3	0–3	1–1	0–0	1–0	—	0–4	0–2	0–1	3–3
Shelbourne	2–3	0–0	2–1	0–3	2–2	1–2	0–1	5–1	3–1	2–0	—	0–0	2–4	2–2
Sligo Rovers	1–1	1–1	0–1	1–2	0–3	1–1	2–4	2–1	0–0	3–2	2–2	—	1–1	1–1
St Patrick's Athletic	1–1	0–1	1–2	1–2	3–1	2–2	3–3	1–3	0–5	1–0	1–3	1–4	—	0–2
Waterford	3–2	0–0	2–1	0–1	2–0	0–2	3–1	7–2	0–1	3–2	4–2	4–1	3–2	—

Legend: Blue = home team win; Yellow = draw; Red = away team win.

== Top scorers ==
Rank	Player	Club	Goals
1	Brendan Bradley	Finn Harps	29
2	Turlough O'Connor	Bohemians	16
3	Mick Leech	Waterford	15
3	Bobby Tambling	Cork Celtic	15
5	Mick Leonard	Sligo Rovers	14
6	Peter Conway	St Patrick's Athletic	13
6	Frank Devlin	Home Farm	13
8	Paul Martin	Athlone Town	12
9	Damien Byrne	Drogheda United	11
9	Terry Flanagan	Dundalk	11
9	Mick Lawlor	Shelbourne	11
