= 1971–72 League of Ireland =

League of Ireland
- Season: 1971–72
- Champions: Waterford (5th title)
- Relegated: None
- European Cup: Waterford
- Cup Winners' Cup: Cork Hibernians
- UEFA Cup: Bohemians
- Matches played: 182
- Goals scored: 590 (3.24 per match)
- Top goalscorer: Alfie Hale, Waterford; Tony Marsden, Cork Hibernians 22 goals

Below are the statistics of League of Ireland in the 1971/1972 season.

== Overview ==
It was contested by 14 teams, and Waterford won the championship.

== Final classification ==
Pos	Team	Pld	W	D	L	GF	GA	GD	Pts	Qualification or relegation
1	Waterford (C)	26	21	2	3	66	35	+31	44	Qualification to European Cup first round
2	Cork Hibernians	26	19	2	5	70	17	+53	40	Qualification to Cup Winners' Cup first round
3	Bohemians	26	16	5	5	45	24	+21	37	Qualification to UEFA Cup first round
4	Finn Harps	26	18	0	8	62	34	+28	36	
5	Shamrock Rovers	26	12	4	10	52	41	+11	28	
6	St Patrick's Athletic	26	9	7	10	33	36	−3	25	
7	Dundalk	26	11	3	12	39	46	−7	25	
8	Cork Celtic	26	8	7	11	36	46	−10	23	
9	Shelbourne	26	6	8	12	30	37	−7	22 (Note: The points for the Athlone Town 1-0 Shelbourne match were awarded to Shelbourne.)	
10	Athlone Town	26	8	7	11	40	56	−16	21	
11	Drogheda	26	6	6	14	30	42	−12	18	
12	Drumcondra (Note: Drumcondra were taken over by, and merged into, Home Farm and changed their club name to Home Farm Drumcondra for next season.)	26	5	6	15	24	52	−28	16	
13	Limerick	26	5	5	16	29	53	−24	15	
14	Sligo Rovers	26	5	4	17	34	71	−37	14	

Source: www.rsssf.com, League of Ireland
(C) Champions

== Results ==
Home \ Away	ATH	BOH	CCF	CHF	DRO	DRU	DUN	FHA	LIM	SHM	SHE	SLI	StP	WAT
Athlone Town	—	1–2	4–4	1–5	2–1	1–1	4–4	2–5	1–0	3–2	1–0 (Note: The points from the match between Athlone Town and Shelbourne FC (1–0) were awarded to Shelbourne.)	2–2	2–1	1–2
Bohemians	1–1	—	1–0	1–0	4–0	2–1	2–1	4–1	3–0	2–2	4–1	1–1	2–0	1–1
Cork Celtic	2–0	2–1	—	0–3	0–0	1–2	4–2	0–1	1–0	3–2	0–3	1–0	3–3	0–1
Cork Hibernians	1–0	2–0	4–1	—	8–1	3–1	4–1	3–0	6–0	3–1	4–0	3–1	2–0	2–3
Drogheda United	3–1	1–2	1–3	0–0	—	5–1	0–1	3–0	1–0	3–3	0–0	5–0	1–3	0–1
Drumcondra	0–2	1–2	1–0	0–4	1–1	—	2–0	1–3	2–1	2–2	1–1	0–1	0–0	0–3
Dundalk	1–0	0–1	4–1	0–4	0–3	1–0	—	3–2	5–2	1–0	1–1	2–1	0–0	3–0
Finn Harps	7–0	3–1	5–2	0–1	2–0	4–1	4–1	—	2–1	5–3	2–1	3–0	0–1	2–0
Limerick	1–1	0–0	2–2	1–0	2–1	4–1	2–1	1–3	—	2–4	0–1	0–1	2–2	0–3
Shamrock Rovers	3–0	1–0	1–2	0–0	3–0	4–1	3–1	1–3	3–0	—	2–1	6–2	1–0	1–2
Shelbourne	3–5	0–2	0–0	1–0	0–0	1–2	0–1	1–0	1–1	0–1	—	5–3	1–1	2–2
Sligo Rovers	1–1	0–3	2–2	0–4	2–0	1–0	1–3	1–2	3–4	2–1	0–4	—	1–2	4–7
St Patrick's Athletic	1–2	0–2	1–1	3–1	1–0	2–2	2–0	1–3	2–1	0–1	1–0	3–2	—	1–3
Waterford	3–2	4–1	2–1	1–3	2–0	3–0	3–2	1–0	3–2	3–1	3–2	7–2	3–2	—

Legend: Blue = home team win; Yellow = draw; Red = away team win.

== Top scorers ==
Rank	Player	Club	Goals
1	Alfie Hale	Waterford	22
1	Tony Marsden	Cork Hibernians	22
3	Brendan Bradley	Finn Harps	18
4	Terry Harkin	Finn Harps	17
5	Miah Dennehy	Hibernians	15
5	Turlough O'Connor	Dundalk	15
7	Carl Davenport	Cork Celtic	11
7	Dave Kirby	Waterford	11
7	Johnny Matthews	Waterford	11
7	Gerry Mitchell	Sligo Rovers	11
7	Jackie Mooney	Bohemians	11
7	Frank O'Neill	Shamrock Rovers	11
