= 1976–77 League of Ireland =

League of Ireland
- Season: 1976–77
- Champions: Sligo Rovers (2nd title)
- Top goalscorer: Sid Wallace, Waterford 16 goals

Below are the statistics of League of Ireland in the 1976/1977 season.

== Overview ==
It was contested by 14 teams, and Sligo Rovers won the championship.

== Final classification ==
Pos	Team	Pld	W	D	L	GF	GA	GD	Pts	Qualification or relegation
1	Sligo Rovers (C)	26	18	3	5	48	20	+28	39	Qualification to European Cup first round
2	Bohemian F.C.	26	17	4	5	50	29	+21	38	Qualification to UEFA Cup first round
3	Drogheda United F.C.	26	12	10	4	56	34	+22	34	
4	Waterford F.C.	26	12	9	5	42	28	+14	33	
5	Dundalk F.C.	26	12	5	9	51	42	+9	29	Qualification to Cup Winners' Cup first round
6	St Patrick's Athletic F.C.	26	9	10	7	30	27	+3	28	
7	Shelbourne F.C.	26	10	8	8	39	40	−1	28	
8	Finn Harps F.C.	26	9	8	9	40	45	−5	26	
9	Cork Celtic F.C.	26	10	5	11	48	44	+4	25	
10	Athlone Town A.F.C.	26	8	7	11	43	46	−3	23	
11	Shamrock Rovers F.C.	26	7	3	16	26	46	−20	17	
12	Limerick F.C.	26	5	6	15	29	47	−18	16	
13	Albert Rovers F.C. (Note: Albert Rovers F.C. changed their name to Cork Albert for next season.)	26	5	6	15	21	42	−21	16	
14	Home Farm F.C.	26	4	4	18	22	55	−33	12	

Source: www.rsssf.com
(C) Champions
Notes:

Galway Rovers F.C. and Thurles Town F.C. were elected to the league for next season.

== Results ==
Home \ Away	ALB	ATH	BOH	CCF	DRO	DUN	FHA	HOM	LIM	SHM	SHE	SLI	StP	WAT
Albert Rovers	—	0–4	0–1	1–5	1–2	0–0	2–2	1–2	4–2	1–2	2–1	0–1	0–0	1–3
Athlone Town	3–1	—	3–1	1–1	2–2	1–3	1–2	4–0	1–0	4–2	2–3	0–5	0–0	3–1
Bohemians	1–0	4–1	—	3–1	3–1	1–3	6–0	2–0	1–1	1–0	2–1	0–3	0–2	0–1
Cork Celtic	1–0	2–2	2–3	—	4–1	0–1	1–2	3–0	5–2	1–1	4–2	2–1	0–0	5–2
Drogheda United	4–0	4–2	2–2	6–3	—	2–2	2–2	5–0	1–1	1–0	3–0	0–0	2–1	2–2
Dundalk	0–2	4–3	1–3	3–1	0–1	—	2–0	6–3	2–1	2–3	1–1	3–1	3–0	2–1
Finn Harps	2–0	1–1	1–2	2–2	1–7	2–1	—	0–0	5–1	3–1	1–2	0–1	2–0	3–1
Home Farm	1–1	1–2	0–1	2–0	0–2	3–1	2–2	—	2–0	1–2	1–3	0–2	1–2	0–3
Limerick	0–1	2–1	1–2	0–2	2–1	2–2	1–2	3–2	—	1–1	1–3	1–3	0–2	0–1
Shamrock Rovers	0–1	1–0	1–2	0–2	1–2	1–3	3–1	0–0	0–4	—	2–3	0–2	1–0	0–2
Shelbourne	1–1	3–0	1–1	1–0	1–1	3–2	2–2	1–0	0–1	1–3	—	1–1	2–0	1–6
Sligo Rovers	1–0	2–1	1–2	2–1	3–1	4–2	2–1	5–0	1–0	3–1	1–0	—	1–2	0–0
St Patrick's Athletic	3–1	0–0	1–5	5–0	0–0	1–1	1–1	2–1	1–1	2–0	1–1	0–1	—	2–1
Waterford	0–0	1–1	1–1	1–0	1–1	2–1	1–0	2–0	1–1	3–0	1–1	2–1	2–2	—

Legend: Blue = home team win; Yellow = draw; Red = away team win.

== Top scorers ==
Rank	Player	Club	Goals
1	Sid Wallace	Waterford	16
2	Turlough O'Connor	Bohemians	15
3	Gary Hulmes	Sligo Rovers	13
3	Paul G. McGee	Sligo Rovers	13
5	Martin Donnelly	Drogheda United	12
5	Donie Madden	Cork Celtic	12
5	Cathal Muckian	Drogheda United	12
8	Brendan Bradley	Finn Harps	11
8	Liam Devine	Shelbourne	11
8	Mick Leonard	Sligo Rovers	11
