= Terry Flanagan (footballer) =

Irish footballer

Personal information
- Full name: Terence Flanagan
- Date of birth: 1950 (age 75–76)
- Place of birth: Dublin, Ireland
- Position: Striker

Senior career*
Years	Team	Apps	(Gls)
1973–1975	Bohemians	41	(20)
1975–1978	Dundalk	69	(24)
1978–1979	Thurles Town	30	(9)
1979–1980	Waterford	5	(0)
1980	Athlone Town	0	(0)
1980	Thurles Town	1	(0)
1982	Galway United	9	(2)

International career
1974	League of Ireland XI	1	(1)
- * Club domestic league appearances and goals

Terry Flanagan (born 1950) is an Irish former footballer who played as a striker for Bohemians, Dundalk and Thurles Town during the 1970s.

Flanagan was top scorer in the 1973-74 League of Ireland season with 18 league goals from 26 games. His total for that season was 29 goals from 43 appearances in all competitions. He made three appearances for Bohemians in European competition, scoring once at Ibrox in the European Cup.

In November 1975, he was transfer listed. He then signed for Dundalk and scored on his debut. In his three seasons at Oriel Park, he scored a total of 33 goals including the winner in a 1977–78 European Cup Winners' Cup clash with Hajduk Split.

== Honours ==
Bohemians

- League of Ireland: 1974–75
- Leinster Senior Cup: 1976–77, 1977–78

Dundalk

- League of Ireland: 1975–76
- FAI Cup: 1977
- League of Ireland Cup: 1978
