= Alfie Hale =

Irish footballer and manager

Personal information
- Full name: Alfred Hale
- Date of birth: 28 August 1939 (age 87)
- Place of birth: Waterford, Ireland
- Height: 5 ft 6 1/2 in (1.69 m)
- Position: Inside forward

Youth career
- 1949–1956: St. Joseph's Juniors

Senior career*
Years	Team	Apps	(Gls)
1956–1957	Waterford	5	(5)
1957–1958	Cork Hibernians	?	(1)
1958–1960	Waterford	34	(21)
1960–1962	Aston Villa	5	(1)
1962–1965	Doncaster Rovers	119	(42)
1965–1966	Newport County	34	(21)
1966–1974	Waterford	165	(111)
1974–1975	Cork Celtic	?	(9)
1975–1976	St Patrick's Athletic	?	(3)
1976–1977	Limerick	7	(2)
1981–1982	Thurles Town	22	(1)
1982–1983	Waterford	8	(0)

International career
1962–1973	Republic of Ireland	14	(2)

Managerial career
- 1969–1970: Waterford United
- 1974–1975: Cork Celtic
- 1981–1982: Thurles Town
- 1982–1988: Waterford United
- 1988–1989: Cobh Ramblers
- 1991–1993: Waterford United
- 1995–1999: Kilkenny City
- * Club domestic league appearances and goals

Alfred Hale (born 28 August 1939) is an Irish former football player and coach who played for several clubs in both the League of Ireland and the English Football League, most notably, Waterford, Aston Villa, Doncaster Rovers and Cork Celtic. During his career, Hale scored 153 goals in the League of Ireland putting him tenth on the all time top scorers list. As an international, Hale also played for the Republic of Ireland.

After retiring as a player, Hale managed several teams in the League of Ireland, including Cork Celtic, Waterford United and Kilkenny City. In June 2003, Hale and such other notable Waterford footballers as Davy Walsh, Paddy Coad, Peter Thomas, Jim Beglin and John O'Shea were honoured by the Waterford City Council and presented with a Waterford Crystal vase.

Hale also has relations with two sisters and further extended family living in Manchester, United Kingdom.

== Early life ==
Alfie Hale was born on 28 August 1939. The youngest of five boys, he grew up on Ard na Gréine road in Waterford. Although he lived next door to Waterford's hurling pitch, Walsh Park, his family were all footballers. Hale's father, Alfie Snr, and his uncles, Tom and John, all played in the half-back line for Waterford in the 1930s. Alfie's brothers Georgie, Dixie and Harry all played for Waterford A.F.C. as well as various grades at international level. Hale joined his local club St Joseph’s and, although the youngest grade at the time was under-15, he began playing at ten years old.

== Club career ==
=== Waterford ===
Hale later joined Waterford A.F.C., a club where he would go on to spend much of his playing and coaching career. At the age of seventeen, Hale, along with Peter Fitzgerald, made a League of Ireland scoring debut at Kilcohan Park on St Patrick's Day 1957 in a 3–1 win over Bohemians. Hale was selected again, 24 hours later, for Waterford's game against Evergreen United in the Munster Senior Cup final. Waterford won the match 5–1 with Hale contributing two goals and an assist. Sources have stated that Hale scored a brace on his home debut against Bohemians, that the match took place on Easter Sunday in 1958 and that the Munster Cup final came against Cork Hibernians where he scored a hat-trick. However, newspapers at the time contradict this version of events, detailing Hale's debut in 1957, Waterford's loss to Transport on Easter Sunday 1958 and Waterford's loss to Limerick in the 1958 Munster Senior Cup semi-final.

Hale joined a team that already featured his brothers, Dixie Hale and George Hale, who protected the youngster as he established himself as a prolific goalscorer and important player. Although George would depart for Cork Hibernians by December 1957, the following season Waterford appointed their first professional manager in Alex Stevenson. Hale credits Stevenson — an ex-Everton and Rangers player who was also a former Irish international — with playing a big part in his development. However, Hale suffered his first setback as, ten days before the 1959 FAI Cup final, the young forward tore ligaments in his knee. Waterford went on to lose the cup final to St Patrick's Athletic after a replay. Hale finished the 1958–59 season as the second highest top scorer in the league with 18 goals, one ahead of teammate Peter Fitzgerald.

His performances began to attract more attention and in 1959–60, he was selected for the League of Ireland amateur team in their 1960 Olympic Games qualifiers. Although they lost to Great Britain, Hale scored in the 6–3 victory over the Netherlands. He was also selected a month later for the professional League of Ireland team, in a match against the German Hesse league, and once again Hale scored. This brought Hale to the attention of the new Aston Villa manager, Joe Mercer. Mercer had been advised by Stevenson, his teammate at Everton, to watch Hale and Mercer was in attendance for the Dutch and German games. Aston Villa expressed their interest but Hale, despite being an amateur player who was free to sign with Villa, instead chose to sign a professional contract with Waterford.

Mercer took Hale over to Wembley to see the 1960 FA Cup final and offered him a contract. Hale did not want to leave Waterford but relented after pressure from his own club, who needed to sell, and encouragement from his father.

=== Aston Villa ===
In June 1960, aged 19, Hale was sold by Waterford to Aston Villa for a fee of £4,500. Hale scored on his home debut against Leicester in the league, despite Villa losing the game 1–3. He also scored on his FA Cup debut, a 2–1 win over Huddersfield in the fourth round. However, Hale struggled to settle in Birmingham city, having been used to rural life. He also found the dressing room and coaching staff unwelcoming in relation to his young age, nationality and religious background. Hale asked to be moved to the youth team, whose players he felt were more accommodating, and went on to make just seven first team appearances, scoring two goals. By his own admission, Hale derived no pleasure from these appearances and had no desire to progress further at the club. Despite this, Hale won his first international cap for the Republic of Ireland while at Villa.

=== Doncaster Rovers ===
Hale wished to return home to Waterford but the club was struggling financially at the time, meaning a transfer was not a viable option. Instead, Hale joined fourth-tier Doncaster Rovers in the summer of 1962. He made his debut for the club on 18 August in a 2–0 defeat to Brentford in the Football League Fourth Division. He scored four goals in a single game as he helped Rovers to a record league win when they beat Darlington. In three seasons with Rovers, Hale made 119 league appearances and scored 42 goals. He also made seven appearances for Rovers in the League Cup and nine in the FA Cup, scoring two further goals.

=== Return to Waterford ===
After a solitary season at Newport County, and seven seasons in total in the English Football League, Hale returned to Waterford in 1966. Together with Johnny Matthews, he became a central figure in a Waterford team that dominated the League of Ireland, winning three titles in a row from 1967–68 to 1969–70. In 1968, Hale and his Waterford teammates took on newly crowned European champions, Manchester United. Former Manchester United player, Shay Brennan, became player–manager of Waterford in 1970. In 1971–72, Hale headed the winner as Waterford beat Cork Hibernians 3–2 in dramatic circumstances at Flower Lodge to claim their fifth league title in six seasons. In both 1971–72 and 1972–73, Hale finished joint top goalscorer in the league as Waterford won the league title, scoring 22 and 20 goals respectively. He was awarded a benefit game in August 1971.

He scored twice against AC Omonia in the 1972–73 European Cup.

=== Cork Celtic ===
Hale signed for the Cork outfit in February 1974 and scored on his debut against Shamrock Rovers. He made two appearances in the 1974–75 European Cup after guiding the club to their only league title in the 1973–74 League of Ireland season.

== International career ==
Between 1962 and 1973, Hale made 14 appearances and scored two goals for the Republic of Ireland national football team. He made his senior international debut on 8 April 1962 in a 3–2 home defeat against Austria. Hale was making his first start alongside another debutant, Tony Dunne, with both men deployed on the right flank; Dunne at right back and Hale on the right wing. Hale's second cap came a few months later, a 4–2 victory at home to Iceland. Hale went on to score twice for the Republic of Ireland, both goals coming in 1968, against Poland and then Austria. He made his last appearance for the Republic of Ireland on 21 October 1973 as a substitute in a 1–0 home win against Poland.

== Managerial career ==
Hale would return to Waterford F.C. as a manager for two further spells. His first tenure at the club, newly renamed to Waterford United, began in 1982 and lasted until 1986. In this time, he guided the club to victory in the League of Ireland Cup in 1985 and to the FAI Cup final in 1986. He returned to manage the club again between 1991 and 1993 and helped them achieve promotion from the First Division in 1992. In 2005, he briefly returned to Waterford United once again, this time acting as special advisor.

Aside from Waterford, Hale has also coached several other teams in the League of Ireland. He was appointed player/manager of Thurles Town in May 1981 where he made history by becoming the League of Ireland's oldest ever goalscorer, and also the only player to score in four different League of Ireland decades. As manager of Cobh Ramblers, Hale signed Roy Keane upon the recommendation of youth team coach, Eddie O'Rourke.

Timing was everything when it came to Roy becoming a Cobh player. That summer, the Irish government had established a new FÁS academy programme that young League of Ireland players were eligible for. Every club in the league was asked to recommend a player or two for the scheme... Cork City wanted to sign Roy but... the fact that they’d given their FÁS slot to another player played into Cobh’s hands. And once Roy knew he could sit the course through Cobh, that made up his mind.

— Alfie Hale, True Blue — The Alfie Hale Story

Between 1995 and 1999 he was manager of Kilkenny City and in 1997, with a team that included his nephew Richie Hale, Brendan Rea, Paul Cashin and Pascal Keane, he guided them to the First Division title. After leaving Kilkenny, Hale remained active in junior football working with Waterford Crystal F.C. and Tramore F.C, winning the first league in 50 years with Tramore in 2000–01.

== Legacy ==
As of 2019, Hale is the tenth highest League of Ireland goalscorer of all time with 153 league goals.

At the same time as managing various League of Ireland clubs, Hale also established himself as a businessman in the Waterford area. In 1978, he opened a sports shop, later trading under the name Alfie Hale's Intersport and located at Arundal Square. He also owns a chain of pubs including Alfie Hale's Bar in Ballybricken and Alfie Hale's Sports Bar on Lombard Street. In December 2008, he settled with the Revenue Commissioners for over €100,000.

== Honours ==
=== Player ===
Waterford

- League of Ireland: 1967–68, 1968–69, 1969–70, 1971–72, 1972–73
- League of Ireland Shield: 1968–69
- Top Four Cup: 1967–68, 1968–69, 1969–70, 1970–71, 1972–73
- Munster Senior Cup: 1965–66, 1966–67
- SWAI Personality of the Year: 1972–73

Cork Celtic

- League of Ireland: 1973–74

=== Manager ===
Waterford United

- League of Ireland Cup: 1984–85
- Munster Senior Cup: 1985–86

Kilkenny City

- League of Ireland First Division: 1996–97
