= Frank Davis (sports administrator) =

Frank Davis (1921 – 17 April 2006) was a sports administrator who was president of the Football Association of Ireland and also associated with Waterford United FC and Gorey Rangers FC.

Davis was chairman of Waterford United during a period of relative success, including when the club won its first League of Ireland title in the 1965–66 season. He was responsible for bringing Johnny Matthews and Peter Thomas to the club from Coventry City. He also brought Jimmy McGeough to Waterford United from Derry City FC. Waterford went on to win six titles in eight years.

He was president of the Football Association of Ireland from 1976 to 1978. During his tenure, there was discussion between the Football Association of Ireland (FAI) and Irish Football Association (IFA) about potentially forming an "All-Ireland Football Federation".

Davis, who operated pub and amusement venue businesses in Courtown, County Wexford, died in April 2006.
