= 1974–75 League of Ireland =

League of Ireland
- Season: 1974–75
- Champions: Bohemians (6th title)

Below are the statistics of League of Ireland in the 1974–75 season.

== Overview ==
It was contested by 14 teams, and Bohemians won the championship.

== Final classification ==
| Pos | Team | Pld | W | D | L | GF | GA | GD | Pts | Qualification or relegation |
|---|---|---|---|---|---|---|---|---|---|---|
| 1 | Bohemians (C) | 26 | 18 | 6 | 2 | 36 | 12 | +24 | 42 | Qualification to European Cup first round |
| 2 | Athlone Town A.F.C. | 26 | 13 | 7 | 6 | 45 | 32 | +13 | 33 | Qualification to UEFA Cup first round |
| 3 | Finn Harps F.C. | 26 | 10 | 10 | 6 | 59 | 50 | +9 | 30 | |
| 4 | Cork Hibernians F.C. | 26 | 10 | 9 | 7 | 42 | 26 | +16 | 29 | |
| 5 | Dundalk F.C. | 26 | 10 | 8 | 8 | 37 | 36 | +1 | 28 | |
| 6 | Waterford F.C. | 26 | 10 | 7 | 9 | 48 | 46 | +2 | 27 | |
| 7 | Cork Celtic F.C. | 26 | 8 | 10 | 8 | 43 | 44 | −1 | 26 | |
| 8 | Shamrock Rovers F.C. | 26 | 10 | 5 | 11 | 40 | 38 | +2 | 25 | |
| 9 | Drogheda F.C. (Note: Drogheda F.C. changed their club name to Drogheda United F.C. for next season.) | 26 | 6 | 12 | 8 | 32 | 37 | −5 | 24 | |
| 10 | St Patrick's Athletic F.C. | 26 | 8 | 7 | 11 | 30 | 37 | −7 | 23 | |
| 11 | Home Farm F.C. | 26 | 7 | 6 | 13 | 31 | 43 | −12 | 20 | Qualification to Cup Winners' Cup first round |
| 12 | Limerick F.C. | 26 | 7 | 6 | 13 | 28 | 46 | −18 | 20 | |
| 13 | Shelbourne F.C. | 26 | 6 | 7 | 13 | 33 | 38 | −5 | 19 | |
| 14 | Sligo Rovers F.C. | 26 | 7 | 4 | 15 | 27 | 46 | −19 | 18 | |

Source: www.rsssf.com
(C) Champions

== Results ==
| Home \ Away | ATH | BOH | CCF | CHF | DRO | DUN | FHA | HOM | LIM | SHM | SHE | SLI | StP | WAT |
|---|---|---|---|---|---|---|---|---|---|---|---|---|---|---|
| Athlone Town | — | 1–1 | 2–3 | 1–0 | 0–0 | 2–0 | 4–4 | 2–2 | 4–0 | 2–1 | 2–1 | 4–2 | 2–0 | 3–1 |
| Bohemians | 1–0 | — | 1–0 | 1–0 | 2–0 | 3–1 | 3–0 | 0–1 | 2–1 | 2–0 | 1–0 | 0–0 | 1–0 | 1–0 |
| Cork Celtic | 1–0 | 1–1 | — | 2–2 | 1–1 | 3–1 | 2–3 | 0–0 | 2–2 | 2–2 | 2–1 | 2–1 | 3–1 | 2–3 |
| Cork Hibernians | 3–0 | 2–1 | 3–0 | — | 3–1 | 4–1 | 4–1 | 2–2 | 7–0 | 1–0 | 0–2 | 0–1 | 1–1 | 2–2 |
| Drogheda | 3–3 | 0–0 | 0–0 | 0–1 | — | 0–0 | 4–3 | 2–1 | 0–1 | 0–2 | 0–0 | 2–4 | 1–1 | 4–2 |
| Dundalk | 0–0 | 0–1 | 3–2 | 1–0 | 1–1 | — | 1–2 | 4–1 | 2–3 | 1–0 | 3–2 | 1–0 | 3–0 | 2–2 |
| Finn Harps | 1–1 | 1–1 | 3–3 | 1–1 | 4–4 | 2–2 | — | 1–0 | 3–1 | 2–3 | 2–2 | 4–1 | 4–0 | 5–1 |
| Home Farm | 2–1 | 0–2 | 1–1 | 0–2 | 4–2 | 0–2 | 2–3 | — | 2–0 | 0–2 | 0–0 | 0–1 | 0–1 | 3–5 |
| Limerick | 0–2 | 0–1 | 0–4 | 0–0 | 0–1 | 0–1 | 2–2 | 3–1 | — | 3–1 | 3–1 | 1–0 | 0–1 | 2–3 |
| Shamrock Rovers | 2–3 | 1–2 | 1–2 | 2–2 | 0–1 | 1–1 | 1–0 | 3–2 | 1–1 | — | 2–3 | 4–1 | 2–1 | 2–1 |
| Shelbourne | 0–1 | 0–2 | 4–0 | 2–2 | 1–1 | 1–2 | 1–2 | 0–1 | 0–0 | 2–2 | — | 2–1 | 2–1 | 0–2 |
| Sligo Rovers | 0–2 | 0–2 | 2–1 | 1–0 | 1–1 | 2–2 | 1–3 | 1–2 | 1–0 | 0–2 | 1–5 | — | 1–2 | 2–1 |
| St Patrick's Athletic | 4–1 | 1–2 | 3–3 | 0–0 | 0–2 | 3–1 | 1–1 | 1–2 | 2–2 | 3–1 | 1–0 | 2–1 | — | 0–1 |
| Waterford | 0–2 | 2–2 | 3–1 | 3–0 | 2–1 | 1–1 | 4–2 | 2–2 | 2–3 | 0–2 | 4–1 | 1–1 | 0–0 | — |

Legend: Blue = home team win; Yellow = draw; Red = away team win.

== Top scorers ==
| Rank | Player | Club | Goals |
|---|---|---|---|
| 1 | Brendan Bradley | Finn Harps | 21 |
| 2 | Mick Leech | Waterford | 11 |
| 3 | Frank Devlin | Home Farm | 10 |
| 3 | Tony Marsden | Cork Hibernians | 10 |
| 3 | Johnny Matthews | Waterford | 10 |
| 6 | Hillary Carlyle | Finn Harps | 9 |
| 6 | Eugene Davis | Athlone Town | 9 |
| 6 | Jim 'Chang' Smith | Finn Harps | 9 |
| 9 | Charlie Ferry | Finn Harps | 8 |
| 9 | Paul Martin | Athlone Town | 8 |
| 9 | Noel Mitten | Bohemians | 8 |
| 9 | Bobby Tambling | Cork Celtic | 8 |
| 9 | Dave Wigginton | Cork Hibernians | 8 |
