= 1968–69 League of Ireland =

Football league season

League of Ireland
- Season: 1968–69
- Champions: Waterford (3rd Title)
- Top goalscorer: Mick Leech; Shamrock Rovers 19 goals

Statistics of League of Ireland in the 1968/1969 season.

== Overview ==
It was contested by 12 teams, and Waterford won the championship for the 3rd time.

== Final classification ==
Pos	Team	Pld	W	D	L	GF	GA	GD	Pts	Qualification
1	Waterford	22	16	4	2	68	30	+38	36	1969–70 European Cup
2	Shamrock Rovers	22	14	3	5	56	28	+28	31	
3	Cork Hibernians	22	14	2	6	39	27	+12	30	
4	Dundalk	22	13	3	6	54	29	+25	29	
5	St Patrick's Athletic	22	10	4	8	41	42	−1	24	
6	Drogheda	22	8	6	8	35	30	+5	22	
7	Limerick	22	9	4	9	30	36	−6	22	
8	Sligo Rovers	22	8	4	10	29	32	−3	20	
9	Drumcondra	22	6	5	11	38	44	−6	17	
10	Shelbourne	22	2	8	12	30	69	−39	12	
11	Cork Celtic	22	3	5	14	28	52	−24	11	
12	Bohemians	22	3	4	15	21	50	−29	10	

Source: www.rsssf.org

Athlone Town and Finn Harps were elected to the league for next season, 1969/70.

== Results ==
Home \ Away	BOH	CCF	CHF	DRO	DRU	DUN	LIM	SHM	SHE	SLI	StP	WAT
Bohemians	—	4–2	1–2	0–4	1–0	1–1	1–2	0–3	5–1	1–2	0–1	2–2
Cork Celtic	1–0	—	1–2	1–0	2–4	3–3	2–0	0–2	1–1	1–3	1–3	1–1
Cork Hibernians	2–0	2–0	—	3–2	2–0	1–2	0–2	2–0	3–1	1–0	6–1	1–0
Drogheda United	1–1	3–3	1–2	—	2–1	1–2	3–1	2–1	4–1	1–0	1–1	0–2
Drumcondra	5–1	5–0	2–2	0–1	—	0–5	0–1	2–2	4–2	2–1	1–1	1–2
Dundalk	6–0	3–0	0–2	0–1	3–1	—	2–0	1–5	4–0	3–2	2–1	2–3
Limerick	2–0	2–1	0–2	2–1	2–2	0–3	—	3–1	3–3	0–2	2–1	1–1
Shamrock Rovers	2–2	4–2	3–1	2–2	2–0	2–1	2–0	—	4–0	2–1	3–0	1–2
Shelbourne	1–0	2–1	1–1	2–2	3–4	2–2	1–1	1–7	—	1–1	1–4	2–5
Sligo Rovers	2–0	1–1	2–1	1–1	1–0	1–5	1–3	0–1	2–2	—	4–1	0–2
St Patrick's Athletic	2–0	4–2	4–0	1–0	1–1	0–3	2–1	1–6	6–2	2–0	—	1–1
Waterford	6–1	3–2	4–1	3–2	7–3	3–1	5–2	5–1	5–0	1–2	5–3	—

Legend: Blue = home team win; Yellow = draw; Red = away team win.

== Top scorers ==
Rank	Player	Club	Goals
1	Mick Leech	Shamrock Rovers	19
2	Turlough O'Connor	Dundalk	17
3	Alfie Hale	Waterford	16
3	John N. O'Neill	Waterford	16
5	Carl Davenport	Cork Hibernans	13
5	Johnny Matthews	Waterford	13
7	Derek Stokes	Dundalk	12
7	Danny Trainor	Waterford	12
9	Frank O'Neill	Shamrock Rovers	11
10	Noel Campbell	St Patrick's Athletic	10
