= 1971–72 Blaxnit Cup =

Tournament details
- Country: Northern Ireland; Republic of Ireland
- Teams: 2

Final positions
- Champions: Cork Hibernians (1st title)
- Runners-up: Coleraine

Tournament statistics
- Matches played: 2
- Goals scored: 8 (4 per match)

The 1971–72 Blaxnit Cup was the 5th edition of the Blaxnit Cup, an association football cup competition featuring teams from Northern Ireland and the Republic of Ireland. Only two teams competed due to the security situation in Northern Ireland.

Cork Hibernians won the title for the 1st time, defeating Coleraine 5–3 on aggregate in the two-legged final.

== Results ==
=== Final ===
13 May 1972

Cork Hibernians	3–2	Coleraine
Dennehy 20', 71'; Wigginton 37'	Report	Curley 68'; Mullan 83'

Flower Lodge, Cork
Attendance: 10,000

18 May 1972

Coleraine	1–2	Cork Hibernians
Jennings 32'	Report	Wigginton 40'; Herrick 66'

The Showgrounds, Coleraine
Attendance: 6,000
Referee: H. Wilson (Belfast)

Cork Hibernians win 5–3 on aggregate.
