= Peter Fitzgerald (footballer) =

Irish footballer (1937–2013)

Personal information
- Full name: Peter Joseph Fitzgerald
- Date of birth: 16 June 1937
- Place of birth: Waterford, Ireland
- Date of death: 29 June 2013 (aged 76)
- Position: Forward

Youth career
- –1959: Waterford Bohemians

Senior career*
| Years | Team | Apps | (Gls) |
| 1956–1959 | Waterford | 41 | (25) |
| 1959—1960 | Sparta Rotterdam | 14 | (7) |
| 1960—1961 | Leeds United | 8 | (0) |
| 1961—1963 | Chester | 80 | (12) |
| 1963–1967 | Waterford | 50 | (10) |
| 1965 | → Cork Hibernians (loan) | 6 | (0) |
| Total | | 199 | (54) |

International career
| 1960–1961 | Republic of Ireland | 5 | (2) |
| 1963–1964 | League of Ireland XI | 3 | (0) |
- * Club domestic league appearances and goals

Peter Joseph Fitzgerald (16 June 1937 – 29 June 2013) was an Irish professional footballer who played as a forward.

== Career ==
Fitzgerald was one of the famous six Waterford brothers who played for the Waterford Blues. Tommy, Jack, Ned, Denny and Paul were the others. Along with Alfie Hale, he made a League of Ireland scoring debut at Kilcohan Park on St Patrick's Day 1957 in a 3–1 win over Bohemians. He started alongside his brother, Jack Fitzgerald, and became the fifth member of the family to play for the club. His brother Jack setting up his goal which Peter finished with a grand header

Along with two of his brothers Peter played in the 1959 FAI Cup Final against St Patrick's Athletic. He scored in the first game at Dalymount Park and in the replay which the Blues lost 2–1.

In May 1959 Fitzgerald was signed by Dutch champions Sparta Rotterdam. In the 1959–60 European Cup Fitzgerald played against Rangers in the quarter finals where they were eliminated after a playoff at Highbury Stadium.

He was signed by Leeds Manager Jack Taylor as his final signing before the start of the 1960–61 season. He was in the first-ever team selected by Don Revie. On 18 March 1961, Fitzgerald was at inside right, with Jack Charlton the emergency centre forward, in a 3–1 loss to Portsmouth.

Fitzgerald moved on to Chester City F.C. for a fee of £5,500 in July 1961. After a good two years, scoring 12 goals in 80 games, he returned home to Ireland in September 1963 to play for Waterford.

The following month Fitzgerald made his debut for the League of Ireland XI. In what was one of the greatest results for a League of Ireland selection they beat their English counterparts, who included Bobby Moore, 2–1 in front of 25,000 at Dalymount.

In August 1967 Fitzgerald had his testimonial game against Leeds.

Fitzgerald later had a spell as caretaker manager of Waterford United at the end of the 1995–96 League of Ireland season.

He also played five times for the Republic of Ireland national team, scoring twice in his second appearance, against Norway.

His brother Jack scored 130 League of Ireland goals. and his father Michael was Chairman of Waterford.

== Honours ==
Cork Hibernians

- Munster Senior Cup: 1964–65

Waterford

- League of Ireland: 1965–66
- Munster Senior Cup: 1965–66
