= 1970–71 League of Ireland =

League of Ireland
- Season: 1970–71
- Champions: Cork Hibernians (1st title)
- Top goalscorer: Brendan Bradley, Finn Harps 20 goals

Below are the statistics of League of Ireland in the 1970/1971 season.

== Overview ==
The championship was contested by 14 teams. Cork Hibernians won the title after beating Shamrock Rovers 3–1 in a play-off. The play-off was held on 25 April 1971 in Dalymount Park. Miah Dennehy (2) and Dave Wigginton scored for Cork Hibernians. Mick Leech scored for Shamrock Rovers.

== Final classification ==
| Pos | Team | Pld | W | D | L | GF | GA | GD | Pts | Qualification or relegation |
|---|---|---|---|---|---|---|---|---|---|---|
| 1 | Cork Hibernians (C) | 26 | 12 | 11 | 3 | 38 | 17 | +21 | 35 | Qualification to European Cup first round |
| 2 | Shamrock Rovers | 26 | 14 | 7 | 5 | 49 | 38 | +11 | 35 | |
| 3 | Waterford | 26 | 13 | 8 | 5 | 49 | 34 | +15 | 34 | |
| 4 | Bohemians | 26 | 12 | 9 | 5 | 38 | 25 | +13 | 33 | |
| 5 | Cork Celtic | 26 | 11 | 9 | 6 | 44 | 27 | +17 | 31 | |
| 6 | Finn Harps | 26 | 13 | 4 | 9 | 54 | 42 | +12 | 30 | |
| 7 | Limerick | 26 | 10 | 8 | 8 | 36 | 31 | +5 | 28 | Qualification to Cup Winners' Cup first round |
| 8 | Shelbourne | 26 | 10 | 7 | 9 | 32 | 30 | +2 | 27 | Qualification to UEFA Cup first round |
| 9 | Dundalk | 26 | 7 | 11 | 8 | 37 | 33 | +4 | 25 | |
| 10 | Athlone Town | 26 | 8 | 5 | 13 | 35 | 43 | −8 | 21 | |
| 11 | Sligo Rovers | 26 | 7 | 7 | 12 | 36 | 58 | −22 | 21 | |
| 12 | St Patrick's Athletic | 26 | 5 | 7 | 14 | 34 | 55 | −21 | 17 | |
| 13 | Drogheda | 26 | 6 | 4 | 16 | 27 | 46 | −19 | 16 | |
| 14 | Drumcondra | 26 | 3 | 5 | 18 | 26 | 56 | −30 | 11 | |

Source: www.rsssf.com
(C) Champions

== Results ==
| Home \ Away | ATH | BOH | CCF | CHF | DRO | DRU | DUN | FHA | LIM | SHM | SHE | SLI | StP | WAT |
|---|---|---|---|---|---|---|---|---|---|---|---|---|---|---|
| Athlone Town | — | 1–1 | 1–0 | 1–1 | 1–4 | 4–0 | 0–0 | 3–5 | 1–3 | 2–4 | 0–0 | 1–0 | 3–4 | 0–3 |
| Bohemians | 3–2 | — | 1–0 | 0–0 | 6–2 | 1–0 | 1–0 | 1–3 | 1–0 | 1–0 | 3–2 | 0–0 | 2–0 | 1–1 |
| Cork Celtic | 1–0 | 1–1 | — | 1–2 | 2–0 | 5–2 | 2–0 | 3–1 | 3–2 | 1–3 | 0–0 | 2–2 | 2–1 | 1–1 |
| Cork Hibernians | 0–0 | 1–0 | 2–1 | — | 3–1 | 3–0 | 2–1 | 3–0 | 0–0 | 0–1 | 1–1 | 0–0 | 5–0 | 0–1 |
| Drogheda United | 0–1 | 0–0 | 1–0 | 1–2 | — | 0–0 | 2–4 | 1–1 | 0–1 | 1–3 | 0–1 | 0–1 | 3–1 | 1–0 |
| Drumcondra | 1–2 | 0–2 | 0–2 | 1–2 | 1–4 | — | 0–3 | 1–3 | 0–1 | 2–2 | 0–1 | 3–1 | 5–3 | 1–4 |
| Dundalk | 2–0 | 0–0 | 0–2 | 0–3 | 1–1 | 1–1 | — | 3–0 | 0–0 | 1–2 | 2–0 | 4–1 | 3–0 | 2–2 |
| Finn Harps | 1–2 | 0–1 | 1–1 | 2–1 | 5–1 | 3–1 | 1–0 | — | 4–3 | 2–3 | 4–0 | 4–1 | 2–1 | 4–0 |
| Limerick | 2–1 | 3–2 | 1–1 | 0–0 | 1–0 | 2–3 | 1–1 | 1–2 | — | 0–0 | 0–0 | 5–0 | 4–2 | 0–1 |
| Shamrock Rovers | 1–4 | 2–2 | 1–1 | 0–0 | 2–0 | 2–1 | 3–3 | 3–1 | 3–1 | — | 1–0 | 1–2 | 4–2 | 2–0 |
| Shelbourne | 2–1 | 2–1 | 1–4 | 0–0 | 2–1 | 2–1 | 0–0 | 2–1 | 1–2 | 5–0 | — | 3–0 | 4–1 | 0–1 |
| Sligo Rovers | 0–1 | 0–4 | 1–6 | 1–3 | 3–1 | 0–0 | 5–2 | 2–2 | 3–0 | 4–3 | 2–2 | — | 4–3 | 2–2 |
| St Patrick's Athletic | 2–1 | 1–1 | 1–1 | 2–2 | 0–1 | 0–0 | 2–2 | 1–1 | 1–1 | 1–2 | 2–0 | 1–0 | — | 1–0 |
| Waterford | 3–2 | 4–2 | 1–1 | 2–2 | 4–1 | 3–2 | 2–2 | 3–1 | 1–2 | 1–1 | 2–1 | 5–1 | 2–1 | — |

Legend: Blue = home team win; Yellow = draw; Red = away team win.

== League Title play-off ==
League Title play-off
25 April 1971
15:30

| Cork Hibernians | 3–1 | Shamrock Rovers |
|---|---|---|
| Miah Dennehy (2), Dave Wigginton | TBA | Mick Leech |

Dalymount Park, Dublin
Attendance: 28,000

== Top scorers ==
| Rank | Player | Club | Goals |
|---|---|---|---|
| 1 | Brendan Bradley | Finn Harps | 20 |
| 2 | Johnny Matthews | Waterford | 17 |
| 3 | Turlough O'Connor | Dundalk | 16 |
| 4 | Damien Richardson | Shamrock Rovers | 15 |
| 5 | Val Wallace | Athlone Town | 14 |
| 6 | Ray Gaston | Finn Harps | 12 |
| 7 | Sean Coyle | Finn Harps | 11 |
| 8 | Alfie Hale | Waterford | 10 |
| 8 | John Murray | Shelbourne | 10 |
| 10 | Mick Leech | Shamrock Rovers | 9 |
| 10 | Harry Quinn | St Patrick's Athletic | 9 |
| 10 | Dave Wigginton | Cork Hibernians | 9 |
