= Dixie Hale =

Irish footballer (1935–2021)

Personal information
- Full name: Richard Hale
- Date of birth: 29 May 1935
- Place of birth: Waterford, Ireland
- Date of death: 12 May 2021 (aged 85)
- Place of death: Swansea, Wales
- Position: Central midfielder

Youth career
- St. Joseph's Juniors

Senior career*
Years	Team	Apps	(Gls)
1951–1952	Waterford		
1952–1953	Shamrock Rovers		
1953–1959	Waterford		
1959–1961	Swansea Town	34	(3)
1961–1964	Barrow	118	(16)
1964–1967	Workington	131	(10)
1967–1971	Watford	113	(10)

International career
- League of Ireland XI
- * Club domestic league appearances and goals

Richard "Dixie" Hale (29 May 1935 – 12 May 2021) was an Irish footballer and manager who played for several clubs in both the League of Ireland and the English League, most notably Waterford, Shamrock Rovers, Swansea Town and Watford. As an international, he also played for the League of Ireland XI.

== Career ==
Born in Waterford City, Hale started his footballing career when he joined his three brothers, Alfie, George, and Harry, at St Joseph's where he had a successful underage career, winning two cup finals on the same day at under-15 and senior level in 1950. Hale had just turned 16 when he joined Waterford F.C., and a year later he became the first professional player signed by Shamrock Rovers. His time in Dublin didn't last long and he moved back to play in Waterford, before leaving for Swansea Town in September 1959. He played there for two years before subsequently joining Barrow and Workington. Hale signed for Watford in 1968 and won the Third Division title that season. After retiring professionally at 35, he went into management in the Welsh League.

== Death ==
Hale died in Swansea on 12 May 2021.

== Honours ==
Watford

- Football League Third Division: 1968–69
