= 1969–70 League of Ireland =

Irish League season

League of Ireland
- Season: 1969–70
- Champions: Waterford (4th title)
- Top goalscorer: Brendan Bradley (Finn Harps); 18 goals

Statistics of League of Ireland in the 1969/1970 season.

== Overview ==
The league was contested by 14 teams, after Finn Harps and Athlone Town were elected to the league. Waterford won the championship.

== Final classification ==
Pos	Team	Pld	W	D	L	GF	GA	GD	Pts	Qualification
1	Waterford (C)	26	16	6	4	55	33	+22	38	1970–71 European Cup
2	Shamrock Rovers	26	14	8	4	55	29	+26	36	
3	Cork Hibernians	26	13	9	4	35	20	+15	35	
4	Limerick	26	12	6	8	35	24	+11	30	
5	Dundalk	26	12	6	8	42	37	+5	30	
6	Shelbourne	26	10	7	9	38	32	+6	27	
7	Finn Harps	26	10	6	10	48	51	−3	26	
8	Sligo Rovers	26	11	4	11	37	41	−4	26	
9	Cork Celtic	26	8	6	12	34	38	−4	22	
10	Athlone Town	26	9	4	13	40	49	−9	22	
11	Bohemians	26	8	4	14	39	45	−6	20	
12	Drogheda	26	5	9	12	26	37	−11	19	
13	St Patrick's Athletic	26	8	1	17	35	54	−19	17	
14	Drumcondra	26	5	6	15	35	64	−29	16	

Source: www.rsssf.org
(C) Champions

== Results ==
Home \ Away	ATH	BOH	CCF	CHF	DRO	DRU	DUN	FHA	LIM	SHM	SHE	SLI	StP	WAT
Athlone Town	—	3–2	2–0	2–1	2–1	4–0	1–2	1–3	1–2	2–2	1–2	1–0	1–3	1–1
Bohemians	3–2	—	0–1	0–2	1–1	4–4	3–0	4–1	1–4	1–2	1–0	1–0	2–0	1–2
Cork Celtic	1–1	4–1	—	0–1	3–1	1–0	0–1	2–3	1–1	0–2	0–1	3–0	2–1	1–1
Cork Hibernians	3–1	2–2	1–0	—	1–0	0–0	0–0	1–1	1–1	1–1	3–0	1–0	3–1	0–0
Drogheda United	1–3	1–1	3–0	0–1	—	2–0	0–1	1–0	0–1	2–2	0–0	2–2	2–0	1–1
Drumcondra	3–1	0–3	2–2	0–1	1–1	—	1–3	4–4	2–1	0–5	3–2	6–4	4–2	0–2
Dundalk	1–2	3–1	1–2	1–4	0–3	2–1	—	2–0	0–0	1–1	2–2	2–0	2–1	6–1
Finn Harps	1–0	2–0	2–1	3–1	1–1	3–2	6–2	—	1–0	2–2	2–1	2–2	2–2	2–4
Limerick	6–1	0–1	2–1	1–0	0–0	3–0	1–1	3–1	—	1–0	2–1	0–1	1–0	1–0
Shamrock Rovers	2–0	2–1	1–3	2–2	2–0	0–0	3–1	4–0	2–0	—	1–1	4–1	3–1	4–1
Shelbourne	2–0	3–2	1–1	1–2	6–1	2–0	1–2	2–1	1–1	1–0	—	0–0	3–1	2–3
Sligo Rovers	1–3	2–1	2–0	0–1	2–1	4–1	2–1	3–2	2–1	3–1	1–1	—	3–0	1–5
St Patrick's Athletic	3–4	1–0	3–2	2–1	2–1	2–0	1–5	3–1	2–1	2–3	1–2	0–1	—	1–4
Waterford	1–0	3–2	4–1	1–1	4–0	6–1	0–0	3–2	3–1	2–4	1–0	1–0	1–0	—

Legend: Blue = home team win; Yellow = draw; Red = away team win.

== Top scorers ==
Rank	Player	Club	Goals
1	Brendan Bradley	Finn Harps	18
2	Dave Wigginton	Cork Hibernians	17
3	Eric Barber	Shamrock Rovers	15
3	Johnny Matthews	Waterford	15
5	Alfie Hale	Waterford	12
5	Jimmy O'Connor	Shelbourne	12
7	Billy Duffy	Athlone Town	11
7	Mick Lawlor	Shamrock Rovers	11
7	Mick Leech	Shamrock Rovers	11
7	John N. O'Neill	Waterford	11
7	Paddy Turner	Dundalk	11
