= 1967–68 League of Ireland =

League of Ireland
- Season: 1967–68
- Champions: Waterford (2nd Title)
- Matches played: 132
- Goals scored: 410 (3.11 per match)
- Top goalscorer: Carl Davenport; Cork Celtic; Ben Hannigan; Dundalk 15 goals

Statistics of League of Ireland in the 1967/1968 season.

== Overview ==
It was contested by 12 teams, and Waterford won the championship.

== Final classification ==
Pos	Team	Pld	W	D	L	GF	GA	GD	Pts	Qualification
1	Waterford	22	16	2	4	59	18	+41	34	1968–69 European Cup
2	Dundalk	22	14	2	6	44	24	+20	30	
3	Cork Celtic	22	12	6	4	40	27	+13	30	
4	Shamrock Rovers	22	11	5	6	44	26	+18	27	
5	Drogheda	22	10	6	6	33	29	+4	26	
6	Limerick	22	9	2	11	35	45	−10	20	
7	Shelbourne	22	8	3	11	32	36	−4	19	
8	Drumcondra	22	6	7	9	31	35	−4	19	
9	St Patrick's Athletic	22	7	4	11	29	46	−17	18	
10	Cork Hibernians	22	6	5	11	19	28	−9	17	
11	Sligo Rovers	22	6	4	12	24	48	−24	16	
12	Bohemians	22	2	4	16	20	48	−28	8	

Source: www.rsssf.org

== Results ==
Home \ Away	BOH	CCF	CHF	DRO	DRU	DUN	LIM	SHM	SHE	SLI	StP	WAT
Bohemians	—	0–0	0–1	1–0	2–3	1–5	1–2	1–2	0–2	0–0	4–1	1–3
Cork Celtic	1–0	—	1–0	2–0	3–2	3–2	3–1	1–4	1–1	3–0	2–0	2–0
Cork Hibernians	5–2	1–2	—	0–0	2–1	2–1	1–2	0–2	1–1	1–2	1–0	0–5
Drogheda United	2–1	1–1	2–1	—	3–0	1–0	2–5	1–1	2–2	3–1	2–1	0–2
Shelbourne	4–1	1–1	1–0	0–1	—	1–2	1–2	2–0	2–2	4–0	2–3	0–4
Dundalk	4–1	1–3	1–0	3–2	3–1	—	5–1	2–1	1–0	3–0	0–0	0–2
Limerick	2–1	3–2	1–1	1–2	1–1	2–3	—	3–2	1–2	3–0	4–0	0–1
Shamrock Rovers	4–1	2–1	1–1	0–1	1–2	1–1	2–1	—	4–0	7–0	2–1	3–2
Drumcondra	2–0	2–0	0–1	2–2	0–1	0–1	2–0	3–3	—	3–2	1–2	1–4
Sligo Rovers	0–0	1–3	2–0	2–2	0–1	2–1	1–0	1–2	1–1	—	7–1	2–0
St Patrick's Athletic	2–2	2–2	1–0	1–4	2–1	0–4	8–0	0–0	2–1	1–0	—	0–1
Waterford	3–0	3–3	0–0	2–0	3–1	0–1	4–0	1–0	4–3	9–0	6–1	—

Legend: Blue = home team win; Yellow = draw; Red = away team win.

== Top scorers ==
Rank	Player	Club	Goals
1	Carl Davenport	Cork Celtic	15
1	Ben Hannigan	Dundalk	15
3	Alfie Hale	Waterford	14
4	Andy McEvoy	Limerick	13
4	John N. O'Neill	Waterford	13
6	Mick Leech	Shamrock Rovers	10
6	Joe McGrath	Limerick	10
6	Damien Richardson	Shamrock Rovers	10
9	Mick Conroy	Shelbourne	8
9	Johnny Matthews	Waterford	8
