= Frank O'Neill (footballer, born 1953) =

Irish footballer (1953–2024)

Personal information
- Date of birth: 1953
- Place of birth: Cobh, County Cork, Ireland
- Date of death: 14 April 2024 (aged 70)
- Place of death: Cobh, County Cork, Ireland
- Position: Striker

Youth career
- Springfield

Senior career*
Years	Team	Apps	(Gls)
1971–1972	Cobh Ramblers		
1972–1974	Cork Celtic		
1974–1975	Cobh Ramblers		
1975–1976	Cork Celtic		
1976–1988	Cobh Ramblers		
- * Club domestic league appearances and goals

Frank "Sniffer" O'Neill (1953 – 14 April 2024) was an Irish footballer who played for several clubs, most notably Cork Celtic and Cobh Ramblers.

== Career ==
O'Neill began his football career with local side Springfield. 1972 proved to be a very successful year for the 19-year-old O'Neill. He was selected for the Cork AUL Youths squad that represented the Republic of Ireland in an international tournament in Coventry, won a Munster Senior League title with Cobh Ramblers before signing for Cork Celtic. O'Neill was the club's leading scorer with 12 goals when Celtic won the 1973–74 League of Ireland.

O'Neill returned to Cobh Ramblers shortly after the league title success, however, he was coaxed back to Cork Celtic for the 1975–76 league before returning to Cobh Ramblers for good. He averaged 30 goals a season as Cobh Ramblers won six successive Munster Senior League titles from 1979–80 to 1984–85. O'Neill also won two FAI Intermediate Cup titles during this period.

When his playing career ended, O'Neill became involved in administration and refereeing affairs. He returned to Cobh Ramblers as assistant manager to George Mellerick in 1993.

== Death ==
O'Neill died after a period of ill health in Cobh, on 14 April 2024, at the age of 70.

== Honours ==
Cork Celtic

- League of Ireland: 1973–74
