= Páirc Uí Rinn =

Stadium in Cork, Ireland

- Interactive map of Páirc Uí Rinn
- Former names: Flower Lodge
- Location: Boreenmanna Road; Cork; Ireland
- Coordinates: 51.891378°N 8.436749°W
- Owner: Cork GAA; Ancient Order of Hibernians
- Capacity: 16,440
- Surface: Grass
- Field size: 144 m x 88 m
- Public transit: Bus Éireann routes: 202, 215, 215A

Construction
- Opened: 1957
- Renovated: 1989 to 1993
- Expanded: 2015

Tenants
- Cork Hibernians (1957–1976); Albert Rovers (1976–1977) → Cork Albert (1977–1978) → Cork Alberts (1979–1980); Cork City (1984–1986)

Páirc Uí Rinn (pronounced [ˈpˠaːɾʲc iː ˈɾˠiːn̠ʲ]), also known as Páirc Chríostóir Uí Rinn, is a Gaelic Athletic Association stadium located between Ballinlough and Ballintemple in Cork. It was previously known as Flower Lodge and was used as an association football stadium. During the 1960s, 1970s and 1980s, Flower Lodge served as the home ground of three League of Ireland clubs – Cork Hibernians, Albert Rovers and Cork City. It also hosted friendly matches featuring Manchester United, Liverpool and the Republic of Ireland national football team. In 1989 it was purchased by Cork GAA and subsequently renamed after Christy Ring, a former Cork and Glen Rovers hurler. During the 1990s, 2000s and 2010s, Páirc Uí Rinn has served as Cork GAA's second home after Páirc Uí Chaoimh. It regularly hosts National Hurling League, National Football League, National Camogie League and All-Ireland Senior Camogie Championship fixtures.

== History ==
=== Early years ===
In 1947 members of AOH F.C., the association football club of the Ancient Order of Hibernians which later became Cork Hibernians, formed a committee to acquire a ground for the club. The AOH subsequently purchased 11.5 acres at Flower Lodge, a local big house, for £5,800. To further raise funds to develop the ground, the committee also organised lotteries and football pools and held fundraising dances at Cork City Hall featuring, among others, Joe Loss and Victor Silvester. An English grounds expert was employed, a Cork firm undertook the work of laying the pitch and an elaborate drainage system was also installed. The first competitive game at the ground was played in February 1957 when Sligo Rovers defeated AOH F.C. 1–0 in a 1956–57 FAI Cup first-round game.

=== League of Ireland era ===
AOH F.C. changed their name to Cork Hibernians and joined the League of Ireland for the 1957–58 season. They initially played their League of Ireland games at The Mardyke before moving to Flower Lodge for the 1962–63 season. They continued to play at Flower Lodge until they withdrew from the league at the end of the 1975–76 season. During this era Cork Hibernians were 1970–71 League of Ireland champions. Flower Lodge hosted several European games featuring Cork Hibernians, including in a 1970–71 Inter-Cities Fairs Cup game against Valencia and a 1973–74 European Cup Winners' Cup game against Baník Ostrava. Cork Hibernians also won the 1972–73 FAI Cup after defeating Shelbourne 1–0 in a replayed final at the Flower Lodge. In 1973–74 Flower Lodge also hosted the LFA President's Cup final which saw Cork Hibernians lose 2–0 to Waterford.

On 28 December 1975 Cork Celtic also staged one significant 1975–76 League of Ireland home game against Drogheda United at Flower Lodge. The occasion marked the League of Ireland debut of George Best. In expectation of a big crowd, Cork Celtic moved the game from their regular home ground, Turners Cross, to the much larger Flower Lodge. An estimated 12,500 fans turned out, with Celtic receiving over £6,000 in gate receipts. Three other Cork clubs who played in the League of Ireland also played home games at Flower Lodge. When Albert Rovers replaced Cork Hibernians in the League of Ireland, they also replaced them as tenants at Flower Lodge. They continued playing there from 1976 until 1980, playing under the names Cork Albert and Cork Alberts. In their 1982–83 FAI Cup semi-final four match marathon encounter with Sligo Rovers, Cobh Ramblers played their two home ties at Flower Lodge. When Cork City joined the League of Ireland they spent their first two seasons, 1984–85 and 1985–86, playing at Flower Lodge. The last game Cork City played at Flower Lodge was a 1985–86 FAI Cup semi-final tie against Shamrock Rovers.

=== Friendlies and internationals ===
During the Big Freeze of 1963 when fixtures in England were cancelled due to poor weather conditions, Manchester United, Bolton Wanderers, Coventry and Wolves played a series of friendlies at Flower Lodge. In one such game Johnny Giles scored as Manchester United defeated Bolton Wanderers 2–0. In the same game Paddy Crerand made his United debut. On 14 May 1965 Flower Lodge hosted a match between the League of Ireland XI and the Irish League XI which the latter team won 1–0. The Republic of Ireland national football team also played at Flower Lodge. On 26 May 1985 they drew 0–0 in a friendly with Spain. The game was part of the Cork 800 celebrations. Also as part of the Cork 800 celebrations the Republic of Ireland women's national football team played a 1987 Euro qualifier against England at Flower Lodge on 22 September 1985. The visitors won 6–0. On 18 August 1986 a Republic of Ireland XI also played Liverpool at Flower Lodge. This match was originally scheduled to take place in 1985 as part of Cork 800 celebrations but was rescheduled because of the post-Heysel Stadium disaster ban. Jan Mølby and Kevin MacDonald scored for Liverpool as they won 2–1.

Ireland Men's International Football Matches
Date	Home	Score	Opponent	Competition	Attendance
26 May 1985	Republic of Ireland	0–0	Spain	Friendly	12,000

=== Cork GAA ===
In 1989, Flower Lodge was purchased by Cork GAA from the Ancient Order of Hibernians for a figure estimated to be between £240,000 and £260,000. The GAA used the money from the two 1989 Michael Jackson concerts at Páirc Uí Chaoimh to complete the purchase. Cork GAA faced a rival bid from Cork City F.C. and during the complex bidding process, they remained anonymous, using three sets of solicitors and making two bids. Cork GAA subsequently renamed the ground Páirc Uí Rinn in honour of Christy Ring, a former Cork and Glen Rovers hurler. It took four years for the Cork GAA to redevelop Páirc Uí Rinn, costing close to £1 million. On 23 May 1993 it was officially re-opened by GAA president, Peter Quinn. The occasion was marked by two challenge games – a hurling match between Cork and Kilkenny and a Gaelic football match between Cork and Meath. Floodlights were added a decade later and the first time they were used was on 1 February 2003 when Cork played Kerry in a 2003 National Football League game.

During the 1990s, 2000s and 2010s Páirc Uí Rinn has served as Cork GAA's second home after Páirc Uí Chaoimh. It regularly hosts National Hurling League, National Football League, National Camogie League and All-Ireland Senior Camogie Championship fixtures. Páirc Uí Rinn has only occasionally hosted Senior Championship level hurling and Gaelic football matches. In 1999 it hosted a Munster Senior Football Championship semi-final between Cork and Limerick. However it had to wait until 2015 to host its second. During 2015 and 2016, while Páirc Uí Chaoimh was being redeveloped, Páirc Uí Rinn hosted further Senior Championship level games. To bring Páirc Uí Rinn up to Senior Championship level standard the ground was refurbished in early 2015. This included moving 1,500 seats from Páirc Uí Chaoimh to the Páirc Uí Rinn main covered stand. During the 2015 Munster Senior Football Championship it hosted a semi-final between Cork and Clare. In 2016 it hosted an All-Ireland hurling qualifier between Cork and Dublin.

=== Capacity ===
During the 1971–72 League of Ireland season it has been estimated that a crowd of up to 26,000 attended a match between Cork Hibernians and Waterford. The current capacity is approximately 16,440. The main covered stand has a capacity of 5,200. The uncovered stand can hold 2,800. The two terraces hold 6,200 and 2,200 and the wheelchair area can accommodate forty people.

== See also ==
- List of Gaelic Athletic Association stadiums
- List of association football venues in the Republic of Ireland
- List of stadiums in Ireland by capacity
