= Tommy Jackson (footballer, born 1946) =

Northern Irish footballer and manager

Personal information
- Full name: Thomas Jackson
- Date of birth: 3 November 1946 (age 79)
- Place of birth: Belfast, Northern Ireland
- Position: Midfielder

Youth career
- Ewart's Rec

Senior career*
Years	Team	Apps	(Gls)
1964–1967	Glentoran	?	(?)
1967	Detroit Cougars	12	(0)
1967–1971	Everton	32	(0)
1970–1975	Nottingham Forest	81	(6)
1975–1977	Manchester United	19	(0)
1978–1982	Waterford United	?	(?)
1983–1985	Crusaders	?	(?)

International career
1968–1977	Northern Ireland	35	(0)
1968	Northern Ireland U23	1	(0)

Managerial career
- 1978–1982: Waterford United
- 1980: League of Ireland XI
- 1983–1986: Crusaders
- 1987–1993: Glentoran
- 1993–1994: Ballymena United
- * Club domestic league appearances and goals

Thomas Jackson (born 3 November 1946) is a Northern Irish former footballer, who played as a midfielder for Everton, Nottingham Forest and Manchester United. He also amassed a total of 35 caps for the Northern Ireland national football team. Following his playing career, he went into management, taking charge of various clubs in both Northern Ireland and the Republic of Ireland.

Jackson began his professional football career playing for Glentoran. He became a regular in the Glentoran side by the age of 21, and won league-winners' medals in 1967 and 1968 before signing for Everton in February 1968. In just over two seasons with the Toffees, Jackson picked up yet another league-winners' medal in 1970. His performances as understudy to the likes of Alan Ball and Howard Kendall attracted the attention of other clubs and, after just 32 league appearances for Everton, Jackson was signed by Nottingham Forest in October 1970.

Forest were struggling for survival in the First Division, but Jackson still only managed to make 81 appearances, albeit scoring six goals. The arrival of Brian Clough and the emergence of Martin O'Neill saw Jackson's opportunities become even fewer and further between, and he was granted a free transfer in the summer of 1975. He was then signed by Manchester United manager Tommy Docherty with the intention of Jackson captaining the club's reserve team and instilling a level of professionalism in the club, which had just been promoted back into the First Division. However, Jackson made such a good impression that he was rewarded with 17 league starts that season, helping the team to an impressive third-place finish. Nevertheless, he spent the 1976–77 season back in his intended reserve team role before retiring back to Ireland to become the player-manager at Waterford United. There, he led the club to two consecutive FAI Cup finals, winning the competition in 1980.

Despite the FAI Cup win, one trophy in four years was not enough for the Waterford United board, and Jackson was sacked in 1982. It was a whole year before he got another management job, returning to Northern Ireland as manager of Crusaders in July 1983. The team won the Gold Cup in 1985, beating Linfield 2–1 in the final, but Jackson left the club in October of the following season, before returning to his first club, Glentoran, three months later. In 6 1/2 years at Glentoran, Jackson led the team to 16 major trophies, including the Double in 1988, but the team's form began to dip after their title win in 1992, and Jackson was sacked in July 1993. He then spent a further year in charge of Ballymena United.

== Honours ==
=== As a player ===
- Irish League: 2
  - Glentoran 1966/67, 1967/68
- Football League First Division (1892–1992)
  - Everton – 1969–70 Football League

=== As a manager ===
- FAI Cup
  - Waterford – 1980
- Gold Cup
  - Crusaders – 1985/86
- Irish League: 2
  - Glentoran 1987/88, 1991/92
- Irish Cup: 3
  - Glentoran 1986/87, 1987/88, 1989/90
- Gold Cup (Northern Ireland): 2
  - Glentoran 1986/87, 1991/92
- Ulster Cup: 2
  - Glentoran 1988/89, 1989/90
- County Antrim Shield: 3
  - Glentoran 1986/87, 1987/88, 1989/90
- Irish League Cup: 2
  - Glentoran 1988/89, 1990/91
- Irish League Floodlit Cup: 2
  - Glentoran 1987/88, 1989/90
