= John Herrick (footballer) =

Irish footballer and manager (1946–2025)

Personal information
- Date of birth: 26 July 1946
- Place of birth: Cork, Ireland
- Date of death: 26 March 2025 (aged 78)
- Place of death: Galway, Ireland
- Position: Defender

Senior career*
Years	Team	Apps	(Gls)
1965–1972	Cork Hibernians	144	(3)
1972–1973	Shamrock Rovers	11	(0)
1973–1976	Cork Hibernians	44	(2)
1976–1978	Limerick	44	(1)
1978–1979	Drogheda United	29	(1)
1979–1983	Galway United	97	(8)
Total		369	(15)

International career
1971–1973	Republic of Ireland	3	(0)
- League of Ireland XI

Managerial career
- 1979–1983: Galway United
- 1980s: Westport United
- 1988: Galway United
- Limerick
- * Club domestic league appearances and goals

John Herrick (26 July 1946 – 26 March 2025) was an Irish league of Ireland and international football player, who played as a defender and who went on to be player-manager at Limerick City and Galway United.

== Club career ==
Herrick made his debut for Cork Hibernians in 1965 having an immediate impact scoring in a 4–0 win over Drogheda. By the 1969–70 season Herrick had become the backbone of a Hibs defensive line up which saw the team have the most successful season in their short history, finishing third in the league. Herrick was the only player to play in all 49 games that season. Herrick was selected on the League of Ireland Team who played the Irish League on St. Patrick's Day 1970.

Herrick was a key member of the Hibs team which would go on to win the league of Ireland in the 1970–71.

Herrick was also a key member of the Hibs team which would win the FAI Cup in 1972. In that year he was also a member of The League of Ireland Team which drew 1–1 with the Italian League in Dalymount Park.

Herrick signed for Shamrock Rovers from Cork Hibernians in December 1972 and made his debut on the 17th of that month. He also played for Galway United, going on to manage the Galway club twice (1979–1983, and 1988). He also managed Limerick.

== International career ==
In 1971 Herrick became the first Cork Hibernians player to be capped at senior international level against Austria in the European Nations Cup. He won a further two caps, against Chile in June 1972 and against France in a 1–1 draw in a world cup qualifying game in Paris in May 1973.

== Personal life and death ==
Herrick's son Mark played for Cork City and Galway United in the 1990s.

Herrick died on 26 March 2025, at the age of 78.

== Honours ==
Cork Hibernians

- League of Ireland: 1970–71
- FAI Cup: 1972
- League of Ireland Shield: 1972
- Blaxnit Cup: 1972
- Dublin City Cup: 1971
