= 1972–73 League of Ireland =

League of Ireland
- Season: 1972–73
- Teams: 14
- Champions: Waterford (6th title)
- Matches: 182
- Top goalscorer: Alfie Hale, Waterford; Terry Harkin, Finn Harps 20 goals

Below are the statistics of League of Ireland in the 1972/1973 season.

== Overview ==
It was contested by 14 teams, and Waterford won the championship.

== Final classification ==
Pos	Team	Pld	W	D	L	GF	GA	GD	Pts	Qualification or relegation
1	Waterford (C)	26	20	2	4	67	21	+46	42	Qualification to European Cup first round
2	Finn Harps	26	19	3	4	59	32	+27	41	Qualification to UEFA Cup first round
3	Bohemians	26	16	5	5	46	25	+21	37	
4	Cork Hibernians	26	13	8	5	53	27	+26	34	Qualification to Cup Winners' Cup first round
5	Shamrock Rovers	26	12	6	8	45	32	+13	30	
6	Athlone Town	26	13	4	9	38	31	+7	30	
7	St Patrick's Athletic	26	7	11	8	37	43	−6	25	
8	Shelbourne	26	9	6	11	50	40	+10	24	
9	Limerick	26	8	6	12	32	35	−3	20 (Note: After the Limerick 2-1 Sligo Rovers game, both points were awarded to Sligo Rovers.)	
10	Sligo Rovers	26	8	2	16	25	51	−26	20	
11	Home Farm Drumcondra (Note: Home Farm Drumcondra changed their club name to Home Farm for next season.)	26	6	7	13	29	60	−31	19	
12	Cork Celtic	26	7	4	15	29	50	−21	18	
13	Dundalk	26	4	6	16	19	48	−29	14	
14	Drogheda	26	1	8	17	22	56	−34	10	

Source: www.rsssf.com
(C) Champions

== Results ==
Home \ Away	ATH	BOH	CCF	CHF	DRO	DUN	FHA	HOM	LIM	SHM	SHE	SLI	StP	WAT
Athlone Town	—	1–2	2–0	2–1	4–1	1–0	1–3	2–4	4–1	1–2	3–3	1–0	1–0	0–1
Bohemians	2–0	—	1–0	1–1	3–1	2–1	2–3	5–3	1–0	3–2	1–0	0–1	3–0	0–3
Cork Celtic	1–2	0–2	—	2–2	1–1	3–0	0–2	4–1	3–1	0–1	1–5	1–2	0–1	1–5
Cork Hibernians	2–0	2–1	4–0	—	1–1	2–0	2–0	6–0	0–0	2–1	1–1	2–3	1–2	3–1
Drogheda United	0–1	1–6	4–2	0–1	—	2–2	0–0	1–1	0–2	1–3	1–1	2–3	1–2	1–4
Dundalk	1–2	0–1	2–0	0–4	1–1	—	1–2	0–1	2–1	1–0	0–1	0–1	1–1	0–4
Finn Harps	1–2	3–2	0–0	2–1	2–1	1–1	—	4–2	2–1	5–0	3–0	2–1	4–2	3–2
Home Farm Drumcondra	1–1	0–1	0–0	0–4	1–1	0–3	3–1	—	0–2	1–1	0–6	2–0	2–3	1–0
Limerick	1–1	1–1	1–2	1–3	4–1	2–0	1–2	2–0	—	0–2	3–1	2–1 (Note: The points from the match between Limerick and Sligo Rovers (2–1) were awarded to Sligo.)	1–1	0–0
Shamrock Rovers	1–0	0–0	2–0	2–2	3–0	6–0	1–3	4–0	0–0	—	1–0	3–0	3–3	1–3
Shelbourne	0–1	1–4	2–4	1–1	3–0	3–0	1–2	1–3	3–0	3–0	—	6–1	2–2	0–1
Sligo Rovers	0–3	1–2	0–2	1–2	1–0	1–1	1–4	1–1	0–3	3–2	1–4	—	0–2	1–3
St Patrick's Athletic	1–1	0–0	0–1	3–3	2–0	1–1	1–3	2–2	3–2	1–1	2–2	0–1	—	2–3
Waterford	2–1	0–0	7–1	2–0	2–0	5–1	3–2	5–0	2–0	0–3	4–0	1–0	4–0	—

Legend: Blue = home team win; Yellow = draw; Red = away team win.

== Top scorers ==
Rank	Player	Club	Goals
1	Alfie Hale	Waterford	20
1	Terry Harkin	Finn Harps	20
3	Johnny Matthews	Waterford	14
4	Eric Barber	Shelbourne	13
4	John Lawson	Cork Hibernians	13
4	Kevin Murray	St Patrick's Athletic	13
7	Joe Nicholl	Finn Harps	12
8	Turlough O'Connor	Bohemians	11
8	Jim 'Chang' Smith	Finn Harps	11
10	Phil Buck	Waterford	10
10	Des Kennedy	Limerick	10
10	Mick Leech	Shamrock Rovers	10
