= Tony Marsden =

English footballer

Personal information
- Full name: Anthony Joseph Marsden
- Date of birth: 11 September 1948
- Place of birth: Bolton, England
- Date of death: 2010 (aged 61–62)
- Position: Forward

Senior career*
| Years | Team | Apps | (Gls) |
| 1966–1969 | Blackpool | 5 | (0) |
| 1969–1971 | Doncaster Rovers | 17 | (2) |
| 1969 | → Grimsby Town (loan) | 2 | (0) |
| 1971–1972 | Cork Hibernians | | |
| 1972–1973 | Bangor City | | |
| 1973–197? | Wigan Athletic | | |
- * Club domestic league appearances and goals

Anthony Joseph Marsden (11 September 1948 – 2010) was an English professional footballer who played as a forward.
