= Miah Dennehy =

Irish footballer (1950–2023)

Personal information
- Full name: Jeremiah Dennehy
- Date of birth: 29 March 1950
- Place of birth: Cork, Ireland
- Date of death: 10 November 2023 (aged 73)
- Place of death: Cork, Ireland
- Position: Winger

Senior career*
Years	Team	Apps	(Gls)
1968–1973	Cork Hibernians	80	(31)
1973–1975	Nottingham Forest	41	(4)
1973	→ Shamrock Rovers XI (guest)	1	(0)
1975–1978	Walsall	128	(22)
1978–1980	Bristol Rovers	52	(6)
1980	Trowbridge Town		
1980	Cardiff City	0	(0)
1980–1981	Cork United	19	(0)
1981–1982	Waterford	25	(3)
1982–1983	Limerick United	8	(4)
1985	Drogheda United	4	(0)
1985	Newcastle West	2	(0)

International career
1972–1977	Republic of Ireland	11	(2)
- * Club domestic league appearances and goals

Jeremiah Dennehy (29 March 1950 – 10 November 2023) was an Irish footballer whose teams included Cork Hibernians, Nottingham Forest, Walsall and Bristol Rovers. In 1972, he became the first-ever player to score a hat-trick in an FAI Cup final.

== Career ==
=== Cork Hibernians ===
Dennehy was signed for Cork Hibernians in 1969 by manager Amby Fogarty. However it was under Fogarty's successor, Dave Bacuzzi, that he became a prominent member of the successful Hibs team of the early 1970s. Other members of team included John Herrick. Dennehy helped Hibs win several trophies including the League of Ireland title in 1971, scoring twice in the play-off decider against Shamrock Rovers. In 1972, he also scored a hat-trick in the FAI Cup final as he helped Hibs defeat Waterford United. This was the first ever hat-trick in an FAI Cup final. He also helped them win the all-Ireland competition, the Blaxnit Cup in 1972 On 29 September 1971, Dennehy also scored for Hibs in a European Cup game against Borussia Mönchengladbach. Hibs had earlier lost the away game 5–0 and then lost the home leg 2–1 with Dennehy scoring Hibs' only goal of the tie. Dennehy netted again in a home win at Flower Lodge against Pezoporikos Larnaca in the 1972–73 European Cup Winners' Cup.

=== English League ===
In January 1973 Dennehy was signed by Nottingham Forest for a fee of £20,000. Under manager Dave Mackay he established himself as a first team regular but lost his place under Brian Clough. After 41 Second Division appearances and four goals, Dennehy was transferred to Walsall in July 1975. In three years with Walsall he made a further 128 league appearances and scored 22 goals. In July 1978 he joined Bristol Rovers where he made 52 league appearances, scoring 6 goals. After just one season with Rovers he signed for Cardiff City but never made any first team appearances and was released from his contract in January 1979. Throughout his time in England, Dennehy regularly played Gaelic football and in 1976 he won a championship medal with Warwickshire. Their opponents in the final were a London team featuring Tony Grealish.

=== Return to Ireland ===
Dennehy returned to the League of Ireland in November 1980 to play for Cork United and went to play for Waterford United, Limerick United, Drogheda United and Newcastle West before retiring.

=== Republic of Ireland international ===
Between 1972 and 1977 Dennehy made 11 appearances and scored two goals for the Republic of Ireland. He made his international debut during Brazilian Independence Cup tournament while still playing for Cork Hibernians. On 18 June 1972, he came on as a substitute in a 3–2 win against Ecuador. This was the first of seven appearances as a substitute. He scored both of his international goals in 1973. The first came on 6 June in a 1–1 away draw with Norway. Then on 10 October he scored the only goal in a 1–0 win against Poland at Dalymount Park. Both of these games were friendlies. He made his last appearance for the Republic in another friendly against Poland on 24 April 1977. On 3 July 1973, at Lansdowne Road, Dennehy also came on as a late substitute for a Shamrock Rovers XI in a 4–3 defeat against Brazil. The Rovers XI was actually an All-Ireland XI which featured both Republic of Ireland and Northern Ireland internationals

== Later years ==
Dennehy eventually returned to Cork where he coached junior soccer teams and played hurling for St Vincent's GAA (Cork). On 17 August 2007, Dennehy was the victim of a serious assault outside a public house in Mayfield, Cork. He spent four months in Cork University Hospital, including five weeks in intensive care. Beginning in February 2008 he underwent therapy in the National Rehabilitation Institute in Dún Laoghaire. On 6 March 2009, David Naughton was sentenced to six years in jail for the assault.

Miah Dennehy died on 10 November 2023, at the age of 73.
