= Peter Thomas (footballer, born 1944) =

Football player and manager (1944–2023)

Personal information
- Date of birth: 20 November 1944
- Place of birth: Coventry, England
- Date of death: 19 January 2023 (aged 78)
- Place of death: Waterford, Ireland
- Position: Goalkeeper

Youth career
- 1962–1966: Coventry GEC

Senior career*
Years	Team	Apps	(Gls)
1966–1967	Coventry City	1	(0)
1967	→ Waterford (loan)	10	(0)
1967–1975	Waterford	193	(0)
1975	Washington Diplomats	6	(0)
1975–1976	Waterford	26	(0)
1976	Utah Golden Spikers	20	(0)
1976–1977	Waterford	24	(0)
1977	Las Vegas Quicksilvers	4	(0)
1977–1978	Waterford	28	(0)
1978	Sacramento Gold	17	(0)
1978–1982	Waterford	114	(0)
1982–1984	Galway United	52	(0)
1984–1985	Drogheda United	18	(0)

International career
1973–1974	Republic of Ireland	2	(0)

Managerial career
- 1988: Waterford United
- * Club domestic league appearances and goals

Peter Thomas (20 November 1944 – 19 January 2023) was a footballer who played as a goalkeeper in England, Ireland and United States. Born in England, he made two international appearances for the Republic of Ireland. He holds Waterford's appearance record in the League of Ireland, having played 392 games for the club.

== Club career ==
In 1962, Thomas joined Coventry G.E.C., playing with them until 1966. That year, he played one game for Coventry City. He went on loan to Waterford F.C. in 1967 where he made thirteen appearances. Coventry City transferred him to Waterford in the summer of 1967 and he stayed with the Blues until 1975. Thomas is associated with bringing a new style of goalkeeping to the League of Ireland. He rarely kicked the ball on the offensive, throwing when possible with great accuracy. He also represented the League of Ireland XI and won five league medals and a FAI Cup medal and played in twelve European Cup matches for Waterford.

In 1975, he moved to the United States where he played for the Washington Diplomats of the North American Soccer League. In 1976, he moved to the Utah Golden Spikers of the American Soccer League. He returned to the NASL in 1977 with the Las Vegas Quicksilvers. The Diplomats had traded the rights to Thomas and Gerry Ingram to the Quicksilver in exchange for Peter Silvester in November 1976. He finished his North American career with the Sacramento Gold of the ASL in 1978. In the fall of 1978, he returned to Ireland where he rejoined Waterford F.C.

== International career ==
Born in England, Thomas earned two caps with the Republic of Ireland after becoming an Irish citizen. He made his debut in 1973 against Poland, keeping a clean sheet but having to come off at half time due to a pulled muscle in his stomach. His second cap came against Brazil in 1974. He was back down in the ASL in 1975, this time with the Sacramento Gold.

== Managerial career ==
Thomas took over as manager of Waterford United in August 1988 but resigned in December due to work pressures.

== Honours ==
Waterford United

- League of Ireland: 1967–68, 1968–69, 1969–70, 1971–72, 1972–73
- FAI Cup: 1980

Individual

- SWAI Personality of the Year: 1969–70

== See also ==
- List of Republic of Ireland international footballers born outside the Republic of Ireland
