= Mick Leonard (Scottish footballer) =

Scottish footballer

Personal information
- Date of birth: 19 October 1953 (age 73)
- Position: Striker

Senior career*
Years	Team	Apps	(Gls)
- Glasgow Perthshire
1973–1974	Celtic	0	(0)
1974–1977	Sligo Rovers		
1976	→ Welland Lions (loan)		
1977–1981	Dunfermline Athletic	101	(37)
- Pollok
Total		101+	(37+)
- * Club domestic league appearances and goals

Mick Leonard (born 19 October 1953) is a Scottish former professional footballer who played as a striker.

== Career ==
Born in Glasgow, Leonard played for Glasgow Perthshire, Celtic, Sligo Rovers, Dunfermline Athletic and Pollok. In the summer of 1976 he played in the National Soccer League with Welland Lions Croatia.
