= Albert Rovers F.C. =

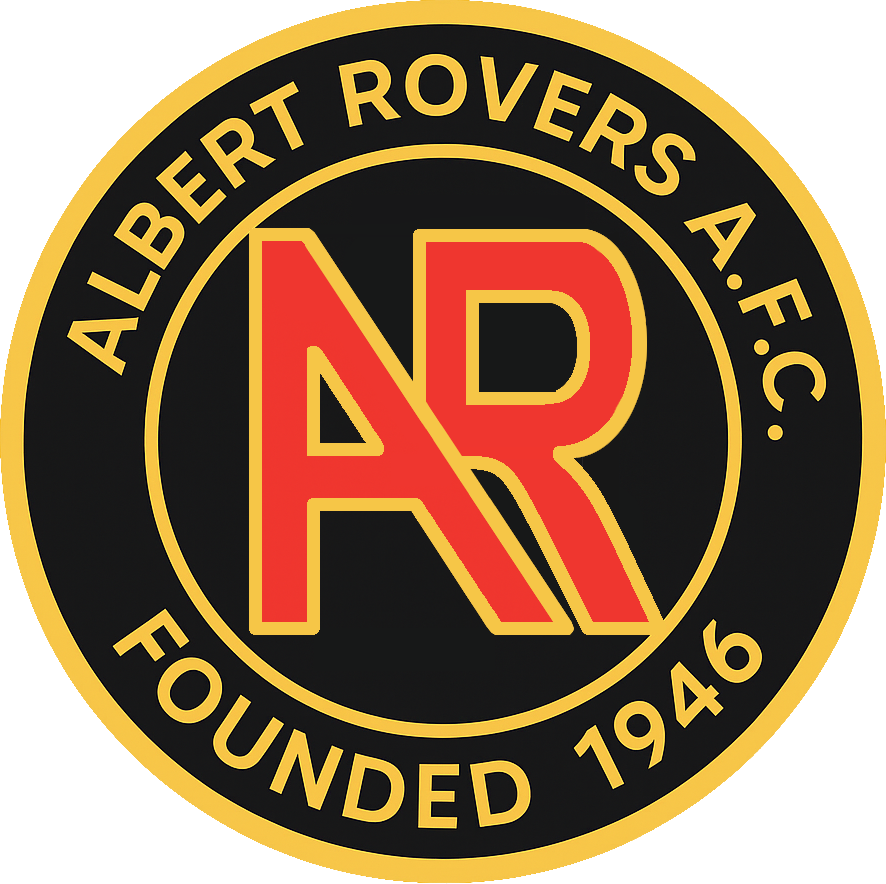
- Full name: Albert Rovers Football Club
- Founded: 1946
- Ground: Flower Lodge (1976–1980); Turners Cross (1980–1982)
- League: League of Ireland; Munster Senior League; Cork Athletic Union League
- Website: homepage.eircom.net/%7Ealbertrovers/2001/index.html
| Home colours | Away colours | Third colours |

Albert Rovers F.C. were an Irish association football club based in Cork. Between 1976–77 and 1981–82 the club played in the League of Ireland. During this time the club also played under the names Cork Albert, Cork Alberts and Cork United. The club has also fielded teams in the Munster Senior League and the Cork Athletic Union League. Throughout their history, the club colours were red and black and occasionally white. They were used in various combinations, including stripes and hoops.

== History ==
=== Early years ===
Albert Rovers F.C. was founded in 1946 and was originally based in the Albert Road and Marina area of Ballintemple, Cork. In 1947, together with Cobh Ramblers, they became founding members of the Cork Athletic Union League. They subsequently joined the Munster Senior League and were Premier Division champions in 1953–54, 1954–55 and 1958–59. The club also enjoyed success in cup competitions. In 1949–50 they defeated League of Ireland teams Waterford and Cork Athletic on their way to winning the Munster Senior Cup. In 1949–50 they were also quarter-finalists in the FAI Cup. In the round of sixteen, they took three games to defeat Longford Town before they were knocked out by Sligo Rovers. They also won the FAI Intermediate Cup in 1953–54 and 1958–59, defeating Jacobs and Bray Wanderers in the respective finals.

=== League of Ireland ===
Between 1976–77 and 1981–82 Albert Rovers played in the League of Ireland. In September 1976 Albert Rovers were elected to the league as replacements for Cork Hibernians. The team was managed by Noel O'Mahony and they made their League of Ireland debut against Shamrock Rovers at Flower Lodge on 3 October 1976. Albert Rovers had requested the game be moved to avoid a clash with the Cork Senior Hurling Championship final but Shamrock Rovers refused. The visitors won 2–1 with Larry Wyse and Mick Leech scoring their goals. The 1977–78 season saw the League of Ireland team adopt the name Cork Albert and for 1978–79 they became Cork Alberts. As Cork Albert the club won the Munster Senior Cup for a second time in 1977–78, defeating Limerick in the final. They were finalists in the 1977–78 League of Ireland Cup but lost out to Dundalk on penalties. England international Bobby Tambling finished his playing career with Cork Alberts while John Meyler also played for the club during this era. Following the demise of Cork Celtic in 1979, the club was Cork city's sole representative in the League of Ireland and the team adopted the name Cork United for the 1979–80 season. The club retained the Cork United name for the 1980–81 and 1981–82 seasons. Cork United managed to sign some notable players including Miah Dennehy, Ian Callaghan and Ian Hutchinson but they never managed to make the move beyond mid-table. As Cork United the club won the Munster Senior Cup for a third and fourth time in 1979–80 and 1981–82. In the finals they defeated Crosshaven and Waterford respectively. In December 1981 the club invested heavily in bringing Manchester City to Turners Cross for a friendly. Hampered by postponements and cancellations, the club slipped into debt and they were unable to pay Manchester City their £8,000 appearance fee. As a result, they were subsequently expelled from the League of Ireland.

Chart of yearly table positions for Cork Alberts in League of Ireland

Season placings

| Season | Position |
|---|---|
| 1976–77 | 13th |
| 1977–78 | 9th |
| 1978–79 | 11th |
| 1979–80 | 14th |
| 1980–81 | 9th |
| 1981–82 | 10th |

=== Later years ===
Throughout their time in the League of Ireland, Albert Rovers continued to field teams in both the Munster Senior League and the Cork Athletic Union League. After their senior team was expelled from the League of Ireland, the club continued to operate at intermediate and junior levels using the Albert Rovers name. The club remained active into the 2000s. One of the last trophies they won was the Cork AUL's President's Cup in 1999–2000, defeating Doneraile in the final at Turners Cross.

== Grounds ==
Albert Rovers played their home games at various grounds throughout Cork city and County Cork. During their early years they played at Southern Park in Blackrock. They also played at grounds in Ballinure, Knockraha, Bottle Hill, Midleton, Farmer's Cross and in Lakewood. When they replaced Cork Hibernians in the League of Ireland, Albert Rovers also replaced them as tenants at Flower Lodge. They continued playing at Flower Lodge from 1976 until 1980. After Cork Celtic vacated Turners Cross, Albert Rovers, now playing as Cork United, replaced them as tenants. In their final days in the League of Ireland, Cork United also played some home games at Kilcohan Park. During the early 1980s, Albert Rovers made plans to develop a facility on the Carrigrohane Road but this was eventually abandoned due to the prohibitive costs. The club subsequently played games on the AUL Number One pitch, off the Skehard Road in Blackrock and at a pitch located at the Douglas Community School on Clermont Avenue, Douglas.

== Notable former players ==
Republic of Ireland internationals

- (Republic of Ireland) Brian Carey
- (Republic of Ireland) Miah Dennehy

England internationals

- (England) Bobby Tambling
- (England) Ian Callaghan

England U23 international

- (England) Ian Hutchinson

Inter-county hurler

- (County Cork) John Meyler

== Managers ==
- (Republic of Ireland) Noel O'Mahony

== Honours ==
- Munster Senior League
  - Winners: 1953–54, 1954–55, 1958–59: 3
- Munster Senior Cup
  - Winners: 1949–50, 1977–78, 1979–80, 1981–82: 4
  - Runners-up: 1953–54: 1
- FAI Intermediate Cup
  - Winners: 1953–54, 1958–59: 2
- League of Ireland Cup
  - Runners-up: 1977–78: 1

== See also ==
- League of Ireland in Cork city
