= Brendan Bradley (footballer) =

Irish footballer (born 1949)

Personal information
- Date of birth: 7 June 1949 (age 77)
- Place of birth: Derry, Northern Ireland
- Height: 6 ft 1 in (1.85 m)
- Position: Forward

Senior career*
Years	Team	Apps	(Gls)
1966–1969	Derry City	4	(0)
1969–1972	Finn Harps	79	(58)
1972–1973	Lincoln City	31	(12)
1973–1978	Finn Harps	115	(82)
1976	→ Toronto Metros-Croatia (loan)	1	(0)
1978–1979	Athlone Town	21	(6)
1979–1982	Sligo Rovers	90	(44)
1982–1985	Finn Harps	74	(41)
1985–1986	Derry City	10	(4)
Total		425	(247)

International career
1976–1978	League of Ireland XI	3	(0)
- * Club domestic league appearances and goals

Brendan Bradley (born 7 June 1949) is an Irish former footballer who played as a forward. He holds the record for the highest number of goals scored by an individual in the League of Ireland with 235. He also scored a club record 181 goals for Finn Harps.

== Early life ==
Brendan Bradley was born on 7 June 1949. He grew up on Malin Gardens road in the Creggan, Derry. A street footballer, he played his first organised match at school when a teacher, who had arranged a trial match, asked him to join. At the age of fifteen, Bradley began playing in the Derry and District League. The youngster started out as a defender before being moved into midfield.

== Career ==
=== Derry City ===
Bradley signed for Derry City at the age of sixteen. Although a regular in the club's reserve team he only made a handful of first team appearances during his three seasons with the club; his route to the first team being blocked by the form of regular striker Danny Hale.

He played four matches in the Irish League and scored in the North-West Cup final against Coleraine, but the lack of first team football left Bradley disillusioned at the club.

=== Finn Harps ===
Despite his limited appearances for Derry, Bradley had impressed Finn Harps manager Patsy McGowan. Harps were in their debut season of the League of Ireland and a fee of £100 secured Bradley's services. In his first season with Harps, Bradley scored his, and his club's, first hat-trick in senior football in an away fixture against Athlone Town, and his tally of 18 goals was the highest in the league. The following season saw Bradley top the list of leading scorers once more, this time with 20 league goals, whilst his goal in the 1971–72 Dublin City Cup was the difference as Finn Harps secured their first major honour with a 1–0 victory over Cork Hibernians. He finished his third season with another 18 goals.

=== Lincoln City ===
In July 1972, Bradley moved to the Football League with Lincoln City manager David Herd paying £6,000 for his services. He made his league debut for the club in the 1–1 away draw with Darlington on 19 August 1972. His first goals for the club came in his third league game, when he netted twice in the 3–0 away victory over Workington on 30 August 1972. He then scored in the following four league fixtures, scoring 11 goals in his first 18 league appearances before Herd left as manager following the 3–1 defeat at Bradford City on 2 December 1972. Although he found the net in new manager Graham Taylor's first game in charge, a 2–2 draw at Newport County on 16 December 1972, that would prove to be his final goal for the Imps as he failed to score in his final 12 appearances that season.

=== Return to Finn Harps ===
With Graham Taylor rebuilding the Sincil Bank based club, Bradley returned to Finn Harps for £4,000 on 22 March 1973. At the time, Finn Harps were involved in a title race but finished a point behind champions Waterford at the end of the season. He ended the 1973–1974 season by scoring the final two goals as Harps won the FAI Cup with a 3–1 victory against St Patrick's Athletic at Dalymount Park. The victory also qualified Harps for the following season's European Cup Winners Cup where they were drawn against Bursaspor. Although Bradley scored in the away leg, a 4–2 defeat on 18 September 1974, a 0–0 draw at home on 2 October 1974 was not enough to keep Harps in the competition. His total of 21 league goals saw him head the league scorers chart for a third time. The 1975–76 season saw him head the scoring charts for a fourth time with 29 league goals, which included all six in the 6–1 victory over Sligo Rovers at Finn Park. These exploits saw him voted the Soccer Writers' Association of Ireland Personality of the Year for 1976. In the close season he headed for the North American Soccer League where he became a teammate of Eusebio at Canadian side Toronto Metros-Croatia, although he only made a single appearance for the club.

=== Later career ===
In 1978, he moved to Athlone Town, before linking once more with his erstwhile Finn Harps manager Patsy McGowan at Sligo Rovers in 1979. Although Bradley would score just 11 in his first season, he notched 19 goals the following season. He followed that up with a further 21 in his final season, netting 44 league goals in total for the club, and collected a FAI Cup runners-up medal from the 1981 final with Dundalk. His total of 51 goals puts him among Rovers top scorers despite only playing three seasons at the Showgrounds. He returned to Harps for the 1982–83 season, staying a further four seasons to become their all-time top goalscorer. He then re-joined Derry City in the January 1986 season, helping the club capture the League of Ireland First Division Shield. Bradley's total of 235 league goals is a League of Ireland record.

== Post-playing career ==
After retiring as a player, he decided against a career in football management, commenting that "it would never take the place of playing for me". Bradley resides in Derry, where he enjoys playing golf and walking. He is an occasional visitor to the Brandywell Stadium in Derry and, after 13 years at Finn Park, he retains "a soft spot for Harps".

In 2019, Bradley was honoured at the FAI International Football Awards, with a Special Merit Award for his outstanding contributions to domestic club football in Ireland.

== Honours ==
=== Club ===
Derry City

- League of Ireland First Division Shield: 1985–86

Finn Harps

- FAI Cup: 1974
- Dublin City Cup: 1971–72

=== Individual ===
- Soccer Writers’ Association of Ireland (SWAI) Personality of the Year: 1976
- Football Association of Ireland (FAI) Special Merit Award: 2018
