= Johnny Matthews =

English footballer and manager (1946–2019)

Personal information
- Date of birth: 27 August 1946
- Place of birth: Coventry, England
- Date of death: 25 December 2019 (aged 73)
- Position: Forward

Youth career
- 1965: Coventry City

Senior career*
Years	Team	Apps	(Gls)
1966–1979	Waterford	327	(143)
1979–1981	Limerick United	41	(6)
1981–1982	Cork United	18	(3)
1982–1983	Waterford United	11	(4)
1983–1984	Galway United	4	(0)
1985–1986	Longford Town	2	(0)
1986–1987	Newcastle West	15	(0)

International career
1970–1971	League of Ireland XI	2	(1)

Managerial career
- 1986–1987: Newcastle West
- 1989–1990: Waterford United
- * Club domestic league appearances and goals

Johnny Matthews (27 August 1946 – 25 December 2019) was an English footballer and manager. Originally playing for Coventry City, he moved to Ireland in the 1960s and played with Waterford United for a number of years. He won several League of Ireland titles with Waterford, and one with Limerick FC. He was subsequently a manager.

== Career ==
Matthews started his career playing with his hometown club of Coventry City.

He moved to Waterford United during the 1965/66 season (at the age of 19) under the impression from Jimmy Hill that it was for just a six-week loan period. Matthews played in the last seven games of the season, scoring twice and his loan period was extended. During the following season, he signed for Waterford on a permanent basis and played the next 13 seasons with the club.

In total, Matthews won 5 league medals with Waterford, and was awarded a sixth many years later after not playing enough games in his first season. He also won three runners-up medals in the FAI Cup. Matthews played in 16 European Cup matches and scored against Celtic at Parkhead and against Manchester United. While playing for a League of Ireland XI against an English League XI in 1971 at Lansdowne Road, Matthews scored a penalty against Gordon Banks.

After also playing for Limerick FC, Cork United and other League of Ireland clubs, Matthews entered management with Newcastlewest FC, in 1986, while still a player. He later returned to Waterford to take a managerial role. He was Waterford manager during the 1989–90 League of Ireland First Division season, when the club won the First Division Title.

Following his playing and managerial career, Matthews became involved in refereeing. He was also involved in other sports, and captained the Munster cricket team.

Matthews died in December 2019. At the time of his death, the 156 goals he had scored made him the "ninth highest goal scorer in the history of the League of Ireland".

== Honours ==
=== As a player ===
- League of Ireland:
  - Waterford: 1965–66, 1967–68, 1968–69, 1969–70, 1971–72, 1972–73
  - Limerick United: 1979–80

=== As a manager ===
- League of Ireland First Division
  - Waterford United: 1989/90

== See also ==
- List of League of Ireland top scorers#All–Time
