= Turlough O'Connor (footballer) =

Irish footballer and manager

Personal information
- Date of birth: 22 July 1946 (age 80)
- Place of birth: Athlone, Ireland
- Position: Striker

Youth career
- Gentex
- Athlone Town

Senior career*
Years	Team	Apps	(Gls)
1963–1964	Limerick	1	(0)
1964–1965	Athlone Town	?	(?)
1965–1966	Bohemians	26	(14)
1966–1968	Fulham	1	(0)
1968–1972	Dundalk	91	(54)
1972–1979	Bohemians	165	(106)
1979–1985	Athlone Town	17	(4)

International career
1967–1972	Republic of Ireland	7	(2)

Managerial career
- 1979–1985: Athlone Town
- 1985–1993: Dundalk
- 1993–1998: Bohemians
- * Club domestic league appearances and goals

Turlough O'Connor (born 22 July 1946) is an Irish former footballer and manager.

His two brothers, Padraig O'Connor and Michael O'Connor, also played for Athlone Town.

== Playing career ==
He has spells as player at Limerick, where he made a scoring debut in a League of Ireland Shield game at Sligo on 25 August 1963, Bohemians, Fulham, Bohemians again, Dundalk and Athlone Town. He made 191 league appearances (scoring 120 times) and 15 appearances in European competition for Bohs (scoring one goal) against Rangers in the European Cup. He was top scorer in the League of Ireland in 1973–74 and 1977–78. O'Connor scored 24 times in 29 league appearances in the latter season. He was Bohemian's top scorer in seven different seasons, his first being in 1964–65 when he scored eight goals in just seven games. He is a member of the Bohemians Hall of Fame.

As of the end of the 2012 season, O'Connor is fourth in the all time League of Ireland goalscoring chart with 178 league goals – 120 with Bohemians, 54 with Dundalk, four with Athlone. He also netted 15 goals in the FAI Cup (14 with Bohs, one with Dundalk) and two goals for the Republic of Ireland. O'Connor was capped twice at youth level.

== Managerial career ==
He was also a very successful manager and has managed Athlone Town, Dundalk and Bohemians. His best period as manager came during his five-year tenure at Athlone, where the League Championship was won twice and the League Cup was won three times, with the Tyler All-Ireland Cup also making its way to St. Mels Park. O'Connor then took over Dundalk in time for the 1985–86 season. He picked up more silverware during his time at Dundalk winning two League Championships, an FAI Cup and two League Cups until he left Oriel Park in October 1993. He was not out of football long as he returned to Bohemians on 14 December 1993, where he stayed until the summer of 1998. During this time, he also managed the Republic of Ireland under-17 team in the 1994 European Under-16 Championship held in Ireland in May 1994.

== Career statistics ==
=== International goals ===
#	Date	Venue	Opponent	Score	Result	Competition
1.	22 November 1967	Stadión Slavia, Prague, Czechoslovakia	Czechoslovakia	1–2	Win	Euro 1968 qual.
2.	18 June 1972	Machadão, Natal, Brazil	Ecuador	3–2	Win	Brazil Independence Cup
Correct as of 22 February 2017
