= Cork Hibernians F.C. =

Defunct association football club in Ireland

Cork Hibernians
- Full name: Cork Hibernians Football Club
- Dissolved: 1977
- Ground: The Mardyke (1957–1962); Flower Lodge (1962–1976)
- Capacity: 26,000
- League: League of Ireland
Home colours

Cork Hibernians F.C. was an Irish football club based in Cork. They played in the League of Ireland between 1957 and 1976 and, from 1962, played their home games at Flower Lodge. In 1971, they were League of Ireland champions. The club was dissolved in 1977 due to financial trouble.

== History ==
The club was originally formed by members of the Ancient Order of Hibernians and had previously played as AOH in the Cork Athletic Union League. Under this name the club won the FAI Intermediate Cup in 1952 and were runners-up in the same competition in 1957. 1957 also saw them change their name, turn semi-professional and join the League of Ireland, replacing Cork Athletic. They played at The Mardyke until 1962, when they moved to Flower Lodge. During the late 1960s and early 1970s Hibs enjoyed a local rivalry with Cork Celtic. Both clubs enjoyed moderate success on the field and support for both teams was very strong. Average gates of 10,000 were not unfamiliar. Indeed, at one game at Flower Lodge against Waterford United, a league decider, an attendance of 26,000 was recorded.

Hibernians enjoyed their most successful era under player-manager Dave Bacuzzi, a former Arsenal and Manchester City defender. Bacuzzi joined the club in May 1970. Initially, he thought he had been approached from a mysterious exotic location when he received a misspelled telegram asking him to contact Cork Island instead of Cork, Ireland. Bacuzzi subsequently guided Hibs to several trophies including the League of Ireland title in 1971, beating Shamrock Rovers in a play-off. In 1972 they won the FAI Cup when Miah Dennehy scored a hat-trick in the final against Waterford United and in 1973 they retained the same trophy. This win earned Cork a place in the 1973–74 European Cup Winners' Cup. In the first round, Hibernians met Czechoslovak outfit Banik Ostrava. In the opening game, away in Ostrava as Cork lost 1–0 on 13 September 1973. On 3 October 1973, Hibs lost 2–1 at Flower Lodge, exiting the competition. Carl Humphries scored the home side's only goal. They also won the all-Ireland competition, the Blaxnit Cup in 1972.

After Bacuzzi left to manage Home Farm in 1974, Hibs remained a top-five club but dramatically folded just before the start of the 1976–77 season. Their crowds had dwindled, and they had lost money fielding ex-England international Rodney Marsh. The club was replaced by another Cork team, Albert Rovers for that season.

In 1985 former player-manager Amby Fogarty attempt to revive the Cork Hibernians name, with the club elected to join the new League of Ireland First Division. However the club was removed from the League of Ireland without playing a game, as the Munster F.A. refused the new team a lease on Turners Cross unless they had their own public liability insurance, which Hibernians could not afford.

== Colours ==
The club wore green shirts, white shorts, and green socks.

== Honours ==
- League of Ireland: 1
  - 1970–71
- FAI Cup: 2
  - 1971–72, 1972–73
- League of Ireland Shield: 2
  - 1969–70, 1972–73
- Blaxnit Cup: 1
  - 1971-72
- Dublin City Cup: 3
  - 1965–66, 1970–71, 1972–73
- Munster Senior League: 5
  - 1942–43, 1949–50, 1950–51, 1952–53, 1962–63
- Munster Senior Cup: 8
  - 1960–61, 1964–65, 1967–68, 1968–69, 1969–70, 1970–71, 1972–73, 1974–75
- FAI Intermediate Cup: 1
  - 1951–52

== Team records ==
- Record Win:
  - 10–1 V's Transport. 20 March 1960, Mardyke.
- Record Defeat:
  - 2–8 V's Dundalk. 10 November 1957, Oriel Park.
- Highest Scorer in One Season:
  - Tony Marsden 22 goals (1971–72)
- Highest League Scorer Aggregate:
  - Dave Wigginton 73 goals;
  - John Lawson 41 goals
  - Tony Marsden 38 goals
  - Donie Wallace 33 goals
  - Miah Dennehy 31 goals.
- Leading Scorer in all Competitions:
  - Dave Wigginton 130.
- Highest Attendance:
  - 26,000 V's Waterford United, April 1972, Flower Lodge.

== Season placings ==
Chart of yearly table positions for Cork Hibernians in League of Ireland

| Season | Position |
|---|---|
| 1975–76 | 5th |
| 1974–75 | 4th |
| 1973–74 | 3rd |
| 1972–73 | 4th |
| 1971–72 | 2nd |
| 1970–71 | 1st |
| 1969–70 | 3rd |
| 1968–69 | 3rd |
| 1967–68 | 10th |
| 1966–67 | 9th |
| 1965–66 | 4th |
| 1964–65 | 4th |
| 1963–64 | 6th |
| 1962–63 | 6th |
| 1961–62 | 5th |
| 1960–61 | 9th |
| 1959–60 | 6th |
| 1958–59 | 10th |
| 1957–58 | 12th |

== European record ==
=== Overview ===
| Competition | Matches | W | D | L | GF | GA |
|---|---|---|---|---|---|---|
| European Cup | 2 | 0 | 0 | 2 | 1 | 7 |
| Inter-Cities Fairs Cup | 2 | 0 | 0 | 2 | 1 | 6 |
| European Cup Winners' Cup | 6 | 2 | 1 | 3 | 7 | 8 |
| TOTAL | 10 | 2 | 1 | 7 | 9 | 21 |

=== Matches ===
| Season | Competition | Round | Opponent | Home | Away | Aggregate |
|---|---|---|---|---|---|---|
| 1970–71 | Inter-Cities Fairs Cup | 1R | (Spain) Valencia | 0–3 | 1–3 | 1–6 |
| 1971–72 | European Cup | 1R | (West Germany) Borussia Mönchengladbach | 0–5 | 1–2 | 1–7 |
| 1972–73 | European Cup Winners' Cup | 1R | (Cyprus) Pezoporikos | 4–1 | 2–1 | 6–2 |
| 1972–73 | European Cup Winners' Cup | 2R | (West Germany) Schalke 04 | 0–0 | 0–3 | 0–3 |
| 1973–74 | European Cup Winners' Cup | 1R | (Czechoslovakia) Baník Ostrava | 0–1 | 1–2 | 1–3 |

== Notable former players ==
- Dinny Allen
- Frankie Connolly
- Patsy Dorgan
- Carl Humphries
- Charlie Tully

== Former managers ==
- George Lax: 1957–59
- John McGowan: 1959–61
- Tommy Moroney: 1961–64
- George O'Sullivan 1963–64
- John Maloney 1965–66
- Amby Fogarty: 1967–69
- Austin Noonan: 1969–70, 1974–76
- Dave Bacuzzi: 1970–74

== See also ==
- League of Ireland in Cork city
