= Waterford F.C. =

Association football club in the Republic of Ireland

Waterford
- Full name: Waterford Football Club
- Nickname: The Blues
- Founded: 1930; 96 years ago
- Ground: Waterford RSC, Waterford, Ireland
- Capacity: 5,154 (3,052 seats)
- Chairman: Jamie Pilley
- Manager: Graham Coughlan
- League: League of Ireland Premier Division
- 2026: 7th of 10
- Website: www.waterfordfc.ie
Home colours	Away colours	Third colours

Waterford Football Club formerly Waterford United Football Club is an Irish association football club based in Waterford who play in the League of Ireland Premier Division. The club was founded and elected to the league in 1930. Originally the club was based at the greyhound stadium known as Kilcohan Park, but moved to the Waterford Regional Sports Centre in the 1993–94 season. In 2018 the club and its players became fully professional.

== History ==
Chart of yearly table positions for Waterford in League of Ireland

=== Early years ===
Waterford first participated in the league in the 1930–31 season finishing ninth and again from 1931 to 1932 before dropping out of the league for two seasons. Waterford re-entered the league in the 1935–36 season along with Sligo Rovers. Waterford won the Shield in their first season. Waterford won the FAI Cup for the first time in their history in 1937 beating St James's Gate and also won the Shield.

The club were league runners up in 1937–38 season and again in the 1940–41 season. Both Waterford and League winners Cork United finished on equal points but Cork were awarded the title as Waterford were unable to compete in the play-off due to a dispute regarding payment to players. At the end of the campaign, the original Waterford resigned from the League of Ireland, only for a new entity, with the same name, to be elected in, for 1944–45 season. Waterford won the Shield again in the 1952–53 season and were again runners-up in the League this time to St Patrick's Athletic in the 1954–55 season and again in the 1962–63 season.

The club eventually won the league title for the first time in the 1965–66 season. The following season they played in the preliminary round of the Champions cup against Vorwärts Berlin, an East German and Army side, losing 6–1 at Dalymount Park and 6–0 in East Berlin. They won the Shield once again in 1968–69 season. Waterford won the league title three times in a row, in 1968,1969 and in 1970. The title was won by Cork Hibernians in 1971 but returned to Waterford in the 1971–1972 season and again in the 1972–73 season. The following season Waterford won the League of Ireland Cup, however failed to regain the league title.

The club won the FAI Cup for the second time under Tommy Jackson in 1980 beating St Patrick's Athletic with the winner coming from a Brian Gardner header.

Waterford's success in the league over the years brought European football where they played against famous clubs such as Manchester United and Celtic. Bobby Charlton had a brief spell at the club in 1976, playing three times and scoring one goal.

=== Early 1980s to mid-2010s ===
In May 1982, the club changed its name to Waterford United. Alfie Hale was appointed manager. In 1985 the league's membership rose to 22 clubs with the election of six new clubs in 1985. This resulted in the introduction of the present two-Division (Premier and First) structure in 1985–86 of which Waterford was a member of the Premier Division. Waterford were relegated to the First Division in the 1988–89 season. Their stay there was short, gaining promotion and winning the First Division title the following season 1989–90. They were unable to retain their Premier Division status the following season finishing in eleventh.

The club was promoted to the top flight in the 1991–92 season finishing as runners up to Limerick. But again the club were unable to remain in the Premier Division for more than a single season suffering relegation on goal difference to Drogheda United.

Waterford United were promoted to the Premier Division, finishing top of the First Division in the 1997–98 season and remained there until the 1999–00 season suffering relegation in the playoffs to Kilkenny City.

Jimmy McGeough was appointed manager in 2002. In his first season he led the club to promotion to the League of Ireland Premier Division in the 2002–03 season.

The League of Ireland changed from a winter league to a summer league for the 2003 season. Waterford finished 6th under Jimmy McGeough. Despite the good season he was controversially sacked, the decision was very unpopular with the club's supporters.

In 2004, The Blues finished 5th and they reached the FAI Cup Final, their first since 1986 under Alan Reynolds as player-manager and Paul McGrath as director of football but lost 2–1 to Longford Town.

In 2006, Waterford United were relegated to the First Division. The FAI took over the running of the League of Ireland at the end of the 2006 season. Part of this takeover involved the assessment of all League of Ireland sides and the manner in which they were being run including finances, infrastructure, future plans, marketability and previous finishing positions since the 2002 season, (this was due to Kildare County only joining the Eircom League in 2002). Despite finishing in 11th and last place ( Dublin City being the 12th team in the league and subsequently folding during the season) the club were forced to play a relegation/promotion playoff against Dundalk. Despite being defeated Waterford United still stood a chance of remaining a Premier Division side due to the FAI assessment. However, on 8 December 2006 the FAI decided to relegate Waterford to the First Division with Shamrock Rovers and Galway United replacing them and the now defunct Dublin City. Dundalk, despite beating Waterford in a playoff, were controversially overlooked and remained in the First Division. However, on 20 February 2007 it was announced that Waterford United had been invited to participate in the Premier Division for the forthcoming season. Club secretary Larry Gough stated that "the club considered the proposal carefully and decided to accept the invitation in the best interests of football in Waterford and the eircom league". However, the Blues were relegated that season via the play-offs, after losing 6–3 on aggregate to Finn Harps.

After the club's relegation, Waterford went into the 2008 season knowing that only one team from the First Division would be promoted. The Blues fell away towards the business end of the season leaving Dundalk and Shelbourne to compete for promotion on the final day of the season.

In 2009, former Bohemians player, Stephen Henderson took over as boss at the club and in his first season, the Blues narrowly missed out yet again for the playoffs and reached the EA Sports Cup Final where they were defeated 3–1 by Bohemians and the FAI Cup semi-finals. The club also finished in 4th in the League, missing out on the playoffs.

Henderson signed a one-year extension to his contract for the 2010 season. His side finished in 2nd place, three points off champions Derry City. His side came up against Monaghan United in the playoffs but were defeated 3–1 in the RSC.

In May 2011, Henderson was sacked after a run of poor form. Waterford native, Paul O'Brien was appointed manager for the duration of the season. Waterford United finished 5th in the 2011 League of Ireland First Division. The board in the off season then appointed Paul as full-time manager on a year contract for the 2012 season.

Paul O'Brien's side fell short of promotion, they defeated champions Limerick four times in four games but still finished 4 points behind them. This meant the playoffs once again for Waterford. In the first section of the playoffs Waterford beat 3rd placed Longford Town 3–1 on aggregate. This set up a tie with Dundalk of the League of Ireland Premier Division. The first leg ended in a 2–2 draw in Oriel Park but Waterford were defeated 2–0 in the second leg at the RSC and would once again remain in the First Division.

The Blues were favourites to lift the title in 2013 but during the season O'Brien resigned due to poor form. Waterford finished in 4th, missing out on the playoffs. During the 2013 season former manager Stephen Henderson was seeking compensation from his previous contract, Henderson claimed he was sacked despite the club claiming he resigned, the club's supporters were forced to step in and raise the money Henderson was owed before the club could be wound up. Tommy Griffin was appointed manager for the 2014 season. The club encountered financial difficulties once again, and the club slipped down the table to a 7th-place finish.

After a disappointing start to 2015, Griffin stepped aside into a new role in the club and Roddy Collins was appointed as manager on a two-and-a-half-year deal. Collins side finished 7th in his first season. In the 2016 season, Collins signed a lot of players he worked with before such as Philip Gorman, James O'Brien and his son, Roddy Collins Jr, and many others. With two games left in the 2016 season and Waterford in 6th it was announced Roddy Collins would leave the club.

=== Modern day ===
After weeks of speculation on social media, the club officially announced in mid-November 2016 that Swindon Town chairman Lee Power had assumed control. Shortly after taking control, he outlined his plan to rebrand the club, removing 'United' from the club's name, going back to the original name of Waterford FC. He also wished to change the club's crest and jersey to something more traditional. On 2 January 2017, the club announced the new managerial team for the coming season. The new head coach was former player and manager Alan Reynolds and Pat Fenlon was appointed as the club's director of football. As the squad started to take shape, the club officially announced on 20 January 2017 that they would change back to the original Waterford FC name. They also unveiled the new crest which was a modernised version of the club's first ever crest from 1930. Under the new leadership, Waterford FC signed several high-profile players. After Waterford beat Wexford 3–0 and Cobh Ramblers were defeated 3–0 by Cabinteely, Waterford were officially crowned league champions and promoted back to the Premier Division for 2018.

Waterford qualified for the Europa League first qualifying round by finishing fourth in the 2018 League of Ireland Premier Division, but were ruled by UEFA to have not passed the "three-year rule" as the club were reformed in 2016. As a result, the berth was given to the fifth-placed team of the league, St Patrick's Athletic.

Reynolds resigned as manager on 16 June 2020.

On 4 June 2021, with the club bottom of the table, it was announced that Lee Power had sold the club to R&S Holdings Ltd, fronted by UK entrepreneur Richard Forrest who had bought the remaining stakes in the club having previously bought 33% earlier in the year. The club finished 9th in the table in 2021, meaning they entered a relegation playoff. Manager Marc Bircham was sacked just days before the relegation play-off with UCD AFC and the team subsequently lost the playoff 2–1, returning Waterford to the First Division. On 14 June 2022, Waterford appointed Danny Searle as manager. Searle had previously been Aldershot Town manager.

In August 2022, Andrew Pilley, then Fleetwood Town F.C. owner, bought out Richard Forrest to become the owner & Chairman of Waterford F.C. In March 2023, Searle was removed from his position just five games into the 2023 season. Two days later, former Bohemians manager Keith Long was appointed as Searle's replacement.

In July 2023, the Waterford FC owner Andrew Pilley was sentenced to 13 years in prison in the UK. In November 2023, following a playoff with Cork City, Waterford FC earned promotion back to the Premier Division. In May 2024, The Willows 96 Holdings Limited took over ownership of Waterford F.C. from Andrew Pilley. This holding company is 100% owned by Jamie Pilley, the son of the former owner.

== Players ==
As of 11 November 2026

=== Current squad ===
Note: Flags indicate national team as defined under FIFA eligibility rules; some limited exceptions apply. Players may hold more than one non-FIFA nationality.

No.	Pos.	Nation	Player
3	DF	POR	Benny Couto
5	DF	IRL	John Mahon
7	MF	ENG	Noah Mawene (on loan from Fleetwood Town)
8	MF	IRL	Evan McLaughlin
9	FW	IRL	Pádraig Amond (captain)
10	MF	IRL	Conan Noonan
16	DF	ENG	Hayden Cann
18	FW	IRL	Tommy Lonergan

No.	Pos.	Nation	Player
20	MF	NOR	Jørgen Voilås
21	GK	IRL	Arlo Doherty
22	DF	IRL	Ronan Mansfield
29	FW	IRL	Zak O'Sullivan
42	FW	IRL	Orion Cala
50	DF	IRL	Noah O'Brien
56	DF	IRL	Aaron Brennan
—	GK	IRL	Igor Bacela

==== Out on loan ====
Note: Flags indicate national team as defined under FIFA eligibility rules; some limited exceptions apply. Players may hold more than one non-FIFA nationality.

No.	Pos.	Nation	Player
14	DF	IRL	Jesse Dempsey (on loan at Fleetwood Town)

== Technical staff ==
As of 2026, the club's technical staff included:

Position	Staff
Head coach	Graham Coughlan

== Stadium ==
=== Regional Sports Centre ===
Waterford FC plays their home games at the Waterford Regional Sports Centre, more commonly referred to as the RSC. They have played at the RSC since the 1992–93 season. The stadium has two stands and holds a capacity of 5,154 with 3,052 seats. The record attendance at the RSC was for an FAI Cup semi-final game in 1997 against Shelbourne where Waterford was defeated 2–1 in front of 8,500 people, this was when spectators were permitted to stand on the running track in the ground. The RSC also hosted the 2009 League of Ireland Cup final where Bohemians defeated Waterford 3–1.

== Supporters and rivalries ==
=== Supporters ===
The club draws its support from Waterford City.

=== Groups ===
The Blues Supporters Club is the official Waterford FC fans group.

An "Ultras" group had previously been formed in 2006.

Waterford FC do often have fans of Lyngby BK in Denmark come to their games, and in turn also go to Lyngby matches.

=== Rivals ===
Waterford contest the Munster Derby with Cork City. Waterford had big derbies with Cork City in the 2000s when Waterford were in the Premier Division and then again when Cork City Foras entered the First Division in the early 2010s. The derby with Cork always being Munsters biggest clash died off when Cork City started challenging the top of the table in the Premier Division and Waterford plummeted to the bottom end of the First Division around 2014. When Waterford drew Cork in the cups the club would usually be easily beaten. When Waterford played Cork in Turners Cross in the EA Sports Cup in 2016 they were beaten 7–0. However the rivalry was somewhat rekindled in 2017 after Waterford were taken over by Lee Power, a heavy challenge by Patrick McClean on Cork's Sean Maguire caused controversy, it led to a huge dispute on social media between Waterford and Cork players with Irish internationals James McClean and Shane Duffy also getting involved defending Patrick's tackle. And despite Waterford being in the First Division they manage to secure the signing of Waterford born Cork centre back Kenny Browne who was on the back of a great season where he starred for the rebels as they won the FAI Cup. The move caused huge controversy with Cork manager John Caulfield.

Waterford have also had a local south east derby game against near neighbours Wexford since 2007 but there has never been any significant rivalry between the clubs. In the 1960s and 1970s,

== Honours ==
- League of Ireland: 6
  - 1965–66, 1967–68, 1968–69, 1969–70, 1971–72, 1972–73
- FAI Cup: 2
  - 1936–37, 1979–80
- League of Ireland First Division: 4
  - 1989–90, 1997–98, 2002–03, 2017
- League of Ireland Cup: 2
  - 1973–74, 1984–85
- League of Ireland Shield: 5
  - 1930–31, 1936–37, 1952–53, 1958–59, 1968–69
- LFA President's Cup: 1
  - 1973–74
- Top Four Cup : 5
  - 1967–68, 1968–69, 1969–70, 1970–71, 1972–73
- Texaco Cup: 1
  - 1974–75
- Munster Senior League: 1
  - 1932–33
- Munster Senior Cup: 16
  - 1934–35, 1945–46, 1947–48, 1955–56, 1956–57, 1965–66, 1966–67, 1975–76, 1980–81, 1985–86, 1986–87, 2007, 2009, 2010, 2013, 2024
- Dr Tony O'Neill Cup: 1
  - 2000–01
- Enda McGuill Cup: 1
  - 2001–02

== European record ==
=== Overview ===
Competition	P	W	D	L	GF	GA	GD
European Cup	14	3	0	11	15	47	32
European Cup Winners' Cup	8	1	1	6	6	14	8
TOTAL	22	4	1	17	21	61	40

=== Matches ===
Season	Competition	Round	Opponent	Home	Away	Aggregate
1966–67	European Cup	PR	(East Germany) Vorwärts Berlin	1–6	0–6	1–12
1968–69	European Cup	1R	(England) Manchester United	1–3	1–7	2–10
1969–70	European Cup	1R	(Turkey) Galatasaray	2–3	0–2	2–5
1970–71	European Cup	1R	(Northern Ireland) Glentoran	1–0	3–1	4–1
1970–71	European Cup	2R	(Scotland) Celtic	0–7	2–3	2–10
1972–73	European Cup	1R	(Cyprus) Omonia	0–2	2–1	2–3
1973–74	European Cup	1R	(Hungary) Újpest	2–3	0–3	2–6
1979–80	European Cup Winners' Cup	1R	(Sweden) Göteborg	1–1	0–1	1–2
1980–81	European Cup Winners' Cup	1R	(Malta) Hibernians	4–0	0–1	4–1
1980–81	European Cup Winners' Cup	2R	(Soviet Union) Dinamo Tbilisi	0–1	0–4	0–5
1986–87	European Cup Winners' Cup	1R	(France) Bordeaux	1–2	0–4	1–6

Notes

- PR: Preliminary round
- 1R: First round
- 2R: Second round

== Notable former players ==
Republic of Ireland internationals

- (Republic of Ireland) Shay Brennan
- (Republic of Ireland) Shamie Coad
- (Republic of Ireland) Paddy Coad
- (Republic of Ireland) Terry Conroy
- (Republic of Ireland) Damien Delaney
- (Republic of Ireland) Miah Dennehy
- (Republic of Ireland) Peter Desmond
- (Republic of Ireland) Al Finucane
- (Republic of Ireland) Peter Fitzgerald
- (Republic of Ireland) Alfie Hale
- (Republic of Ireland) Noel Hunt
- (Republic of Ireland) Mick Leech
- (Republic of Ireland) Tony Macken
- (Republic of Ireland) Seán Maguire
- (Republic of Ireland) Con Martin
- (Republic of Ireland) Tommy McConville
- (Republic of Ireland) Paul McGee
- (Republic of Ireland) Daryl Murphy
- (Republic of Ireland) Jackie O'Driscoll
- (Republic of Ireland) Frank O'Neill
- (Republic of Ireland) Noel Synnott
- (Republic of Ireland) Peter Thomas
- (Republic of Ireland) Tommy Taylor
- (Republic of Ireland) Eddie Nolan

League of Ireland XI representatives

- (Republic of Ireland) Shay Brennan
- (Republic of Ireland) Jody Byrne
- (Republic of Ireland) Mattie Clarke
- (Republic of Ireland) Billy Dixon
- (Republic of Ireland) Tommy Farrel
- (Republic of Ireland) Peter Fitzgerald
- (Republic of Ireland) Liam Hennessy
- (Republic of Ireland) Noel King
- (Republic of Ireland) Alan Kirby
- (Republic of Ireland) Mick Leech
- (Republic of Ireland) Tommy McConville
- (Republic of Ireland) Pat Morley
- (Republic of Ireland) David Parkes
- (Republic of Ireland) Noel Synnott
- (Northern Ireland) Jimmy McGeough
- (England) Johnny Matthews
- (England) Bobby Tambling
- (England) Sid Wallace
- (England) Freddie Haycock

Republic of Ireland U23 internationals

- (Republic of Ireland) Shane Duggan
- (Republic of Ireland) Derek McGrath

Republic of Ireland U21 internationals

- (Republic of Ireland) Dan Connor
- (Republic of Ireland) Dean Delaney
- (Republic of Ireland) Neale Fenn
- (Republic of Ireland) Michael Foley
- (Republic of Ireland) Stephen Grant
- (Republic of Ireland) Liam Kearney
- (Republic of Ireland) Alan Kirby

Republic of Ireland B internationals

- (Republic of Ireland) Dan Connor
- (Republic of Ireland) Neale Fenn

Republic of Ireland U17 internationals

- (Republic of Ireland) Gary Dempsey

Other Internationals

- (England) Bobby Tambling
- (England) Bobby Charlton
- (Estonia) Sander Puri
- (Nigeria) Dominic Iorfa
- (Northern Ireland) Jimmy D'Arcy
- (Northern Ireland) Tommy Jackson
- (Northern Ireland) Danny Trainor
- (Chile) Lawrence Vigouroux
- (Scotland) David McCulloch
- (Scotland) David Herd
- (Wales) Bert Gray
- (United States) Ed McIlvenny
- (Saint Vincent and the Grenadines) Rodney Jack
- (Madagascar) Bastien Héry

== Former managers ==
- (Republic of Ireland) Paddy Coad (1960–1963)
- (Republic of Ireland) John Phelan (1963–1964)
- (Republic of Ireland) Paddy Coad (1964–1967)
- (Scotland) Martin Ferguson (1967–1968)
- (Republic of Ireland) Vinny Maguire (1968–1969)
- (Republic of Ireland) Alfie Hale (1969–1970)
- (Republic of Ireland) Shay Brennan (1970–1974)
- (Scotland) Jim Craig (1974–1975)
- (Republic of Ireland) Peter Fitzgerald (1975)
- (Republic of Ireland) Paul O'Donavon (1975)
- (Scotland) John McSeveney (1975–1977)
- (England) Colin Harper 1978
- (Northern Ireland) Tommy Jackson (1978–1982)
- (Republic of Ireland) Alfie Hale (1982–1988)
- (Republic of Ireland) Peter Thomas (1988)
- (England) Andy King (1988–1989)
- (Republic of Ireland) Derek Casey (1989)
- (England) Johnny Matthews (1989–1990)
- (Republic of Ireland) Shamie Coad (1990)
- (Republic of Ireland) Alfie Hale (1991–1993)
- (England) Brendan Ormsby (1993–1994)
- (England) Johnny Matthews (1994–1995)
- (Republic of Ireland) Michael Bennett (1995–1996)
- (Republic of Ireland) Peter Fitzgerald (1996)
- (Republic of Ireland) Tommy Lynch (1996–1998)
- (England) Mike Flanagan (1998–2000)
- (Republic of Ireland) Paul Power (2000–2002)
- (Northern Ireland) Jimmy McGeough (2002–2003)
- (Republic of Ireland) Giles Cheevers (2003)
- (Republic of Ireland) Alan Reynolds (2004–2005)
- (Republic of Ireland) Brendan Rea (2005)
- (Republic of Ireland) Mike Kerley (2005–2006)
- (Republic of Ireland) Gareth Cronin (2006–2008)
- (Republic of Ireland) Stephen Henderson (2008–2011)
- (Republic of Ireland) Paul O'Brien (2011–2013)
- (Republic of Ireland) Tommy Griffin (2014–2015)
- (Republic of Ireland) Roddy Collins (2015–2016)
- (Republic of Ireland) Alan Reynolds (2017–2020)
- (Republic of Ireland) John Sheridan (2020)
- (Republic of Ireland) Fran Rockett (interim) (2020)
- (Republic of Ireland) Kevin Sheedy (2021)
- (Republic of Ireland) Mike Geoghegan (interim) (2021)
- (Canada) Marc Bircham (2021)
- (England) Ian Hendon (2021)
- (Republic of Ireland) Ian Morris (2022)
- (Republic of Ireland) Gary Hunt (interim) (2022)
- (England) Danny Searle (2022–2023)
- (Republic of Ireland) Keith Long (2023–2025)
- (England) Matt Lawlor (interim) (2025)
- (England) John Coleman (2025)
- (England) Matt Lawlor (interim) (2025)
- (Republic of Ireland) Jon Daly (2025–2026)
- (Republic of Ireland) Brian Murphy (interim) (2026)
- (Republic of Ireland) Graham Coughlan (2026–)

== Colours and badge ==
The club's colours have always been primarily blue with white trim since the 1930s influenced mainly by the colours of County Waterford.

=== Badge ===
2017–2025 crest

As part of the club's decision to change from 'Waterford United' back to 'Waterford' ahead of the 2017 season, a new badge was commissioned. The new badge initially received negative feedback for its England-esque three lions, despite this symbol being a callback to a Waterford A.F.C. crest of the past, which itself was influenced by the old Waterford coat of arms.

Waterford F.C. launched a new badge in November 2025. Chairman Jamie Pilley stated that the fans' desire to replace the existing crest arose at his very first fan forum as owner. The badge features Waterford’s three ships, taken from the county’s coat of arms, sailing on the River Suir as well as the club's founding year of 1930.

=== Kits ===
As of the 2020 season, the club's kit was manufactured by Umbro and included the traditional blue home kit and a white away kit. Ahead of the 2025 season, a "multi-year partnership" was agreed with Puma for kit manufacturing, with the Whitebox Group confirmed as the club's main sponsor. The Puma-manufactured kit, planned for the 2026 season, was designed with blue, white and navy trim.

In 2010, Waterford had a rare red away kit with white trim.

== See also ==
- Frank Davis, chairman of the club and later president of the FAI
