= PFAI Players' Player of the Year =

Irish football award

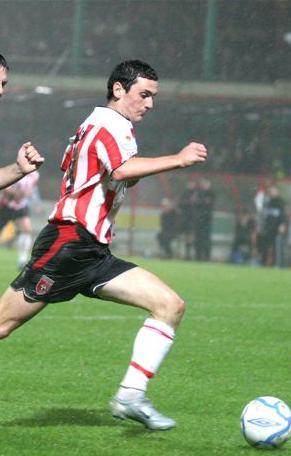
Mark Farren won the award in 2005.

The Professional Footballers' Association of Ireland Players' Player of the Year (often called the PFAI Players' Player of the Year, the Players' Player of the Year, or simply the Irish Player of the Year) award is given to the footballer the League of Ireland Premier Division, who is seen to have been the best player of the previous season.

The shortlist is compiled by the members of the Professional Footballers' Association of Ireland (the PFAI), and then the winner is voted for by the other players in the league. The prize is regarded as the highest awarded by the PFAI and is seen as the primary "Player of the Year" award in Ireland.

The award was first given in 1981, and was won by Athlone Town player Padraig O'Connor. The latest winner of the award is Michael Duffy of Derry City.

== List of winners ==
Highlighted players are winning the award for a second time.

=== 2020s ===
Year	Player	Club
2026	(Republic of Ireland) Daryl Horgan	Dundalk
2025	(Republic of Ireland) Michael Duffy	Derry City
2024	(Republic of Ireland) Dylan Watts	Shamrock Rovers
2023	(Republic of Ireland) Chris Forrester	St Patrick's Athletic
2022	(Republic of Ireland) Rory Gaffney	Shamrock Rovers
2021	(Republic of Ireland) Georgie Kelly	Bohemians
2020	(Republic of Ireland) Jack Byrne	Shamrock Rovers

=== 2010s ===
Year	Player	Club
2019	(Republic of Ireland) Jack Byrne	Shamrock Rovers
2018	(Republic of Ireland) Michael Duffy	Dundalk
2017	(Republic of Ireland) Sean Maguire	Cork City
2016	(Republic of Ireland) Daryl Horgan	Dundalk
2015	(Republic of Ireland) Richie Towell	Dundalk
2014	(Republic of Ireland) Christy Fagan	St Patrick's Athletic
2013	(Republic of Ireland) Killian Brennan	St Patrick's Athletic
2012	(Republic of Ireland) Mark Quigley	Sligo Rovers
2011	(Libya) Éamon Zayed	Derry City
2010	(Republic of Ireland) Richie Ryan	Sligo Rovers

=== 2000s ===
Year	Player	Club
2009	(Scotland) Gary Twigg	Shamrock Rovers
2008	(Republic of Ireland) Keith Fahey	St Patrick's Athletic
2007	(Republic of Ireland) Brian Shelley	Drogheda United
2006	(Cameroon) Joseph N'Do	Shelbourne
2005	(Republic of Ireland) Mark Farren	Derry City
2004	(Republic of Ireland) Jason Byrne	Shelbourne
2003	(Republic of Ireland) Jason Byrne	Shelbourne
2003	(Republic of Ireland) Glen Crowe	Bohemians
2002	(Republic of Ireland) Owen Heary	Shelbourne
2001	(Republic of Ireland) Glen Crowe	Bohemians
2000	(Republic of Ireland) Pat Fenlon	Shelbourne

=== 1990s ===
Year	Player	Club
1999	(Republic of Ireland) Paul Osam	St Patrick's Athletic
1998	(Republic of Ireland) Pat Scully	Shelbourne
1997	(Northern Ireland) Peter Hutton	Derry City
1996	(Republic of Ireland) Eddie Gormley	St Patrick's Athletic
1995	(Northern Ireland) Liam Coyle	Derry City
1994	(Republic of Ireland) Stephen Geoghegan	Shamrock Rovers
1993	(Republic of Ireland) Donal O'Brien	Derry City
1992	(Republic of Ireland) Pat Fenlon	Bohemians
1991	(Republic of Ireland) Pat Morley	Cork City
1990	(Republic of Ireland) Mark Ennis	St Patrick's Athletic

=== 1980s ===
Year	Player	Club
1989	(Republic of Ireland) Paul Doolin	Derry City
1988	(Republic of Ireland) Paddy Dillon	St Patrick's Athletic
1987	(Republic of Ireland) Mick Byrne	Shamrock Rovers
1986	(Republic of Ireland) Paul Doolin	Shamrock Rovers
1985	(Republic of Ireland) Tommy Gaynor	Limerick City
1984	(Republic of Ireland) Pat Byrne	Shamrock Rovers
1983	(Republic of Ireland) Martin Murray	Drogheda United
1982	(Republic of Ireland) Paul McGrath	St Patrick's Athletic
1981	(Republic of Ireland) Padraig O'Connor	Athlone Town

== Breakdown of winners ==
=== Winners by club ===
Club	Number of wins
St Patrick's Athletic	9 (1982, 1988, 1990, 1996, 1999, 2008, 2013, 2014, 2023)
Shamrock Rovers	9 (1984, 1986, 1987, 1994, 2009, 2019, 2020, 2022, 2024)
Derry City	7 (1989, 1993, 1995, 1997, 2005, 2011, 2025)
Shelbourne	6 (1998, 2000, 2002, 2003, 2004, 2006)
Dundalk	4 (2015, 2016, 2018, 2026)
Bohemians	4 (1992, 2001, 2003, 2021)
Cork City	2 (1991, 2017)
Sligo Rovers	2 (2010, 2012)
Drogheda United	2 (1983, 2007)
Limerick	1 (1985)
Athlone Town	1 (1981)

=== Winners by country ===
Country	Number of wins
Republic of Ireland	41 (1981, 1982, 1983, 1984, 1985, 1986, 1987, 1988, 1989, 1990, 1991, 1992, 1993, 1994, 1996, 1998, 1999, 2000, 2001, 2002, 2003, 2004, 2005, 2007, 2008, 2010, 2012, 2013, 2014, 2015, 2016, 2017, 2018, 2019, 2020, 2021, 2022, 2023, 2024, 2025, 2026)
Northern Ireland	2 (1995, 1997)
Cameroon	1 (2006)
Scotland	1 (2009)
Libya	1 (2011)

== See also ==
- PFAI Young Player of the Year
- PFAI Team of the Year
