= John Toal (association footballer) =

Irish footballer

Personal information
- Date of birth: 5 November 1967 (age 58)
- Place of birth: Dublin, Ireland
- Position: Midfielder

Senior career*
Years	Team	Apps	(Gls)
1986–1988	Shamrock Rovers	23	(2)
1988–1992	Drogheda United		
1992–1997	Shamrock Rovers	126	(20)
1997–1999	Portadown	22	(0)
2000–2001	Home Farm	8	(1)
2001–2002	Dundalk	1	(0)

International career
1994 1995	League of Ireland XI	2	(0)

Managerial career
- 2002–2003: Dublin City
- * Club domestic league appearances and goals

John Toal (born 5 November 1967) is an Irish retired footballer.

Toal was born in Dublin, Ireland. He made his competitive debut for Shamrock Rovers in the FAI League Cup on 14 September 1986. He made his League of Ireland debut for Shamrock Rovers at Home Farm on 14 April 1987.

Toal played for Shamrock Rovers in the last game at Glenmalure Park in a game that decided the League of Ireland B Division title on 19 May 1987.

He played in the 1987–88 FAI League Cup Final loss to Cork City.

He signed for Drogheda United in time to make his debut on the opening day of the 1988–89 League of Ireland First Division season.

In June 1992 he re-joined Rovers under manager Ray Treacy and scored once in 17 league appearances in his first season. In his second season that he really came to the fore in the centre of midfield as he scored 10 goals in 31 league appearances as Rovers stormed to their 15th League title.

Toal was named in the best league XI for the 1993–94 League of Ireland Premier Division and 1994–95 League of Ireland Premier Division seasons. That season he was also in the PFAI Inaugural Premier Division XI.

He played twice in the 1994–95 UEFA Cup for the Hoops.

Toal managed doomed Dublin City for the 2002–03 season.

== Honours ==
- League of Ireland Premier Division
  - Shamrock Rovers 1993–94
- League of Ireland First Division: 2
  - Drogheda United 1988–89 1990–91
- League of Ireland First Division Shield
  - Drogheda United 1991
- LFA President's Cup
  - Shamrock Rovers – 1987–88
- PFAI First Division Player of the Year
  - Drogheda United F.C. – 1990–91
- Irish Cup
  - Portadown 1999
