= Peter Hanrahan =

Irish footballer

Personal information
- Date of birth: 23 February 1968 (age 58)
- Place of birth: Limerick, Ireland
- Position: Forward

Senior career*
| Years | Team | Apps | (Gls) |
| 1986–1989 | UCD | | |
| 1989–1990 | Limerick | | |
| 1990–1994 | Dundalk | 124 | (38) |
| 1994–1999 | Bohemians | 115 | (16) |
| 1999–2000 | UCD | | |

International career
- Irish Universities
- League of Ireland XI
- * Club domestic league appearances and goals

Peter Hanrahan (born 23 February 1968) was an Irish soccer player during the 1980s and 1990s. He was a midfielder or forward who played for UCD, Dundalk, Limerick City and Bohemians during his career in the League of Ireland.

== Career ==
Hanrahan began his career at UCD, making his League of Ireland debut at Newcastlewest F.C. on 19 October 1986, and helped them to promotion in 1988–89. During his time at UCD he also played for Irish Universities.

He then moved to his home town club and made his debut for his home club on the opening day of the 1989–90 in a controversial game where the referee was assaulted as the home side lost.

After only one season Hanrahan moved to Dundalk where he was Player of the Month in October 1990. He was top scorer in the 1990–91 League of Ireland Premier Division with 18 league goals and was awarded the SWAI Personality of the Year for that season. He also picked a league winners medal that season with Dundalk. He moved to Bohs in the mid 90s and made 115 league appearances (16 goals) during his 5 seasons at the club. In 1999, he returned to UCD to finish his career.

He is the brother of fellow footballer Joe with whom he played alongside at Bohs for a short spell.
