= League of Ireland First Division Shield =

Association football competition

- Founded: 1985
- Region: (Republic of Ireland) Ireland
- Most championships: UCD: 2 Galway United: 2

The League of Ireland First Division Shield was an association football competition featuring teams from the League of Ireland First Division. The inaugural winners were Derry City. It was also the first competition Derry City won after they joined the League of Ireland.

== Format ==
The 1994–95 format saw the 10 participating teams divided into two groups of five – a northern group and a southern group. The teams played a single round of games against the other teams in their group. The two winners, UCD and Drogheda United, then played off in a two legged final. UCD won 2-1 on aggregate. The competition was played during the first half of the season with the two legged final played in October 1994.

== List of Finals ==
Possibly incomplete

| Season | Winner | Score | Runners-up | Venue |
|---|---|---|---|---|
| 1985–86 | Derry City | 6–1 | Longford Town | ^{(Note 1)} |
| 1986–87 | EMFA | 4–2 | Finn Harps | Oriel Park |
| 1990–91 | Drogheda United | 1–0 | Home Farm | ^{(Note 1)} |
| 1991–92 | UCD | 2–1 | Waterford United | ^{(Note 1)} |
| 1992–93 | Galway United | 3–0 | Home Farm | Dalymount Park |
| 1993–94 | Sligo Rovers | 2–1 | Waterford United | ^{(Note 1)} |
| 1994–95 | UCD | 2–1 | Drogheda United | ^{(Note 1)} |
| 1995–96 | Bray Wanderers | 3–3 | Waterford United | ^{(Note 2)} |
| 1996–97 | Galway United | 2–0 | Limerick | Terryland Park |
| 1997–98 | Home Farm Everton | 5–3 | Cobh Ramblers | ^{(Note 1)} |

=== Notes ===
- ^1 Played over two legs.
- ^2 Played over two legs. Bray Wanderers won on penalties.
