= Pat Fenlon =

Irish footballer & coach (born 1969)

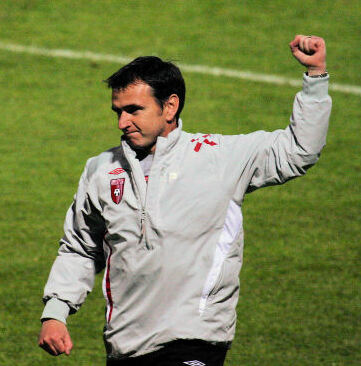
- Fenlon in 2007

Personal information
- Date of birth: 15 March 1969 (age 57)
- Place of birth: Dublin, Ireland
- Height: 5 ft 7 in (1.70 m)
- Position: Midfielder

Team information
- Current team: Bohemians (Director of Football)

Youth career
- Tolka Rovers
- Home Farm
- Lourdes Celtic
- Rivermount FC
- 1984–1987: Chelsea

Senior career*
Years	Team	Apps	(Gls)
1987–1991	St Patrick's Athletic	84	(24)
1991–1994	Bohemians	88	(29)
1994–1996	Linfield	62	(18)
1996–1997	Shamrock Rovers	31	(4)
1997–2003	Shelbourne	153	(27)
Total		418	(102)

International career
1988–1992	Republic of Ireland U21	3	(0)
1992	Republic of Ireland B	1	(1)

Managerial career
- 2002–2006: Shelbourne
- 2007: Derry City
- 2007–2008: Republic of Ireland U23
- 2008–2011: Bohemians
- 2011–2013: Hibernian
- 2014–2016: Shamrock Rovers
- 2017–2018: Waterford (Director of Football)
- 2018–2023: Linfield (General Manager)
- 2023–: Bohemians (Director of Football)
- * Club domestic league appearances and goals

Patrick Fenlon (born 15 March 1969) is an Irish football coach and former player.

Fenlon played as a midfielder for St Patrick's Athletic, Bohemians, Linfield, Shamrock Rovers and Shelbourne. As a manager he won five League of Ireland titles with Shelbourne and Bohemians between 2003 and 2009. During his time with Bohemians Fenlon also won the FAI Cup in 2008, the League of Ireland Cup in 2009 and the Setanta Sports Cup in 2010. Fenlon moved to Scottish club Hibernian in November 2011, who he helped reach two Scottish Cup Finals, although both were lost heavily.

== Playing career ==
Fenlon was born in Dublin. After playing as a schoolboy with four local clubs, he was with London club Chelsea as a young trainee. A midfielder, he returned home and signed for Brian Kerr's St Patrick's Athletic in 1987 and made his League of Ireland debut on 13 September 1987, against Shelbourne at Harold's Cross Stadium.

Fenlon won the League of Ireland championship with St Pats in 1989–90. In September 1990 he scored against Dinamo Bucharest in the European Cup. After four seasons at St Pats, he signed for Bohemians in the summer of 1991. He scored 29 goals in 88 appearances for Bohs and won the FAI Cup in 1992, as well as the PFAI Player of the Year accolade. In February 1992, Fenlon scored for the Republic of Ireland in a 'B' international against Denmark.

Fenlon signed for Linfield in January 1994, a club supported mainly by fans drawn from Belfast's Protestant community, becoming the first Dublin catholic to do so. Speaking about his time with Linfield twenty years later, Fenlon said he had been abused by fellow Irish Catholics for his decision to join Linfield based on their history. Fenlon won two Irish Cups and one Irish Premier League championship with Linfield. It was Fenlon's goal against Glentoran on the final day of the 1993–94 season which sealed the title for Linfield. He also scored the second goal in the 2–0 win against Bangor in the Irish Cup Final a week later.

In June 1996, he signed for another Dublin club, Shamrock Rovers. But after one season he transferred to Shelbourne,. Whilst playing for Shels he suffered a triple fracture of the shin in a match against Rovers in Tolka Park on 12 February 1999. He recovered from this to help fire Shelbourne to the league and cup double the following season, and secure a second PFAI Player of the Year award. He scored the winning goal for Shelbourne in the 1999/00 FAI Cup final replay, as Shelbourne beat Bohemians 1–0.

== Management career ==
=== Shelbourne ===
Fenlon started out his management career as player/manager of Shelbourne in 2002. He guided the club to second place in his first season in charge. By the start of the 2003 season, Fenlon had retired from playing to focus solely on the management of the club. The rewards were immediate, and Fenlon took the club to their first ever back-to-back league titles, in 2003 and 2004.

The 2004 season also saw Fenlon lead his squad past Icelandic champions KR Reykjavík and Croatian high-flyers Hajduk Split and into the third (final) qualifying round of the UEFA Champions League, where his Shelbourne side were eventually overturned by Spanish giants Deportivo la Coruña. Following this amazing run, and participation in the First Round of the UEFA Cup against Lille OSC, Fenlon was rewarded with a contract extension. This made him the first manager to reach the third qualifying round of the competition with an Irish club.

2005 promised big things for Fenlon and Shelbourne. However, things did not go exactly as planned. In spite of several big name signings, Shelbourne staggered past the season's finishing-line in a disappointing third place. One of Fenlon's former clubs, Linfield, also beat Shelbourne in the first Setanta Cup final. 2006 saw the return of success. Dogged by continuous rumours involving a move from Tolka Park during the 2006 season, Fenlon guided the club to their third league title in 4 years on 17 November 2006, with a 2–1 victory over rivals Bohemians, which saw the Dubliners claim the title on goal difference.

=== Derry City ===
This was followed by reports linking Fenlon to the vacant hot-seat at Derry City left by Stephen Kenny, who had departed the Brandywell Stadium to take up the managers position at Scottish side Dunfermline Athletic. Fenlon resigned from his position as Shelbourne manager on 5 December 2006 and the reports proved true when Derry concluded an agreement with him. In January 2007, Fenlon was awarded the eircom/Soccer Writers Association of Ireland (SWAI) 'Personality of the Year' award after his success during the 2006 season with Shelbourne. However, results at Derry did not favour Fenlon and he resigned his position after just five months. Fenlon was also manager for a series of games for the Republic of Ireland under-23 national team, consisting entirely of League of Ireland players.

=== Bohemians ===
On 22 December 2007, he was appointed manager of Bohemians. In 2008, within a year of his appointment, he guided Bohs to their second League of Ireland/FAI Cup double in a decade. The 19 points winning margin in the League was a new record. He won the league in 2009 with Bohs beating arch rivals Shamrock Rovers by 4 points. Bohs also won the League of Ireland Cup that year. Scottish Premier League club Dundee United attempted to appoint him as their manager in January 2010, although their compensation offer of £90,000 was rejected, with Bohemians looking for over £200,000. Bohemians won the Setanta Sports Cup in 2010, but then suffered financial problems.

=== Hibernian ===
Fenlon was linked with the manager's position at Hibernian in November 2011. Hibernian were struggling badly in the SPL at the time and were in danger of relegation. Bohemians gave Hibernian permission to talk to Fenlon on 23 November and he was appointed two days later. Unusually, what would be Fenlon's debut game as manager away to Motherwell was abandoned at half time, when one of the Fir Park floodlights caught fire.

Hibs earned only one point from Fenlon's first five matches in charge. On 14 January 2012, Hibs won their first league game under Fenlon, against Dunfermline. With the club still struggling, Fenlon decided to shake up the squad in January 2012 by releasing some players and replacing them with loan signings, including James McPake. The team's form improved and Hibernian made progress in the battle to avoid relegation. Furthermore, a late goal by Leigh Griffiths gave Fenlon's side a 2–1 victory against Aberdeen and a place in the 2012 Scottish Cup Final. Fenlon then guided Hibs to safety in the SPL, but they lost 5–1 in the Scottish Cup Final to Edinburgh derby rivals Hearts and Fenlon was sent to the stand by referee Craig Thomson late in the game.

The 2012–13 season began with 10 new faces in to replace the majority of the side that lost the cup final. Hibs pushed on in the first half of the season and found themselves top of the league after their 3–0 win over Dundee. After a slump in the middle of the season, a 1–0 victory against Dundee on the final day resulted in Hibs finishing 7th in Fenlon's first full season in charge. Hibs also beat Hearts to progress into the 5th round of the Scottish Cup. Wins against Aberdeen, Kilmarnock and Falkirk meant that Hibs reached a second successive Scottish Cup final, which they lost 3–0 to Celtic.

The 2013–14 season began with a humiliating 9–0 aggregate defeat to Swedish side Malmö in the second qualifying round of the Europa League, including a 7–0 reverse at Easter Road in the home leg. Fenlon apologised to the supporters, but the defeats against Malmö placed him under pressure. A run of just one defeat in nine matches left Hibernian safely in mid-table and eased that pressure, but some Hibs fans protested against Fenlon after the team lost a League Cup quarter-final against Hearts. Fenlon resigned on 1 November 2013.

=== Shamrock Rovers ===
Fenlon was appointed manager of Shamrock Rovers in August 2014.

=== Waterford ===
On 2 January 2017 Fenlon was appointed in a Director of Football role at Waterford. Waterford native Alan Reynolds was also appointed as the club's Head Coach on the same day. Fenlon had worked with Reynolds before at Shelbourne in 2005–2006 where they won the League of Ireland Premier Division together. Waterfords promotion was sealed after Waterfords 3–0 win over Wexford was coupled with nearest challengers Cobh Ramblers 3–0 defeat to Cabinteely and the First Division title was secured with two games to spare and for the first time in ten years Waterford returned to the League of Ireland Premier Division. Fenlon left his post at Waterford in February 2018 to work with the chairman of the club Lee Power as a consultant on his worldwide projects.

=== Linfield ===
In November 2018, Fenlon was appointed to a general manager position with Linfield.

=== Return to Bohemians ===
In January 2023, Fenlon returned to Bohemians as their Director of Football.

== Managerial statistics ==
As of 3 July 2016 (UTC)

Team	Nat	From	To	Record				
Team	Nat	From	To	G	W	D	L	Win %
Shelbourne^{1}	(Republic of Ireland)	26 April 2002	5 December 2006	135	76	38	21	56.30
Derry City	(Republic of Ireland)	8 December 2006	22 May 2007	11	4	3	4	36.36
Republic of Ireland U23	(Republic of Ireland)	15 October 2007	22 October 2008	3	2	0	1	66.67
Bohemians	(Republic of Ireland)	22 December 2007	25 November 2011	174	106	35	33	60.92
Hibernian	(Scotland)	25 November 2011	1 November 2013	87	31	19	37	35.63
Shamrock Rovers	(Republic of Ireland)	6 August 2014	3 July 2016	69	36	19	14	52.17
Total				478	254	114	110	53.14

- 1.Includes only league record.

== Honours ==
=== Player ===
St Patrick's Athletic

- League of Ireland Premier Division (1): 1989–90

Bohemians

- FAI Cup (1): 1991–92
- Leinster Senior Cup (1): 1993

Linfield

- Irish League (1): 1993–94
- Irish Cup (2): 1993–94, 1994–95

Shamrock Rovers

- Leinster Senior Cup (1): 1997

Shelbourne

- League of Ireland Premier Division (2): 1999–00, 2001–02
- FAI Cup (1): 1999–00

=== Manager ===
Shelbourne

- League of Ireland Premier Division (3): 2003, 2004, 2006

Bohemians

- League of Ireland Premier Division (2): 2008, 2009
- FAI Cup (1): 2008
- Setanta Sports Cup (1): 2009–10
- League of Ireland Cup (1): 2009

Hibernian

- Scottish Cup
  - Runners-up (2): 2011–12, 2012–13

=== Individual ===
- PFAI Players' Player of the Year (2): 1991–92, 1999–2000
- SWAI Personality of the Year (2): 2004, 2006
