= 1987–88 League of Ireland First Division =

League of Ireland First Division
- Season: 1987–88
- Champions: Athlone Town A.F.C.
- Promoted: Cobh Ramblers F.C.
- Top goalscorer: Con McLoughlin: 19 (Finn Harps)

The 1987–88 League of Ireland First Division season was the third season of the League of Ireland First Division.

== Overview ==
The First Division was contested by 10 teams and Athlone Town A.F.C. won the division.

== Final table ==
Pos	Team	Pld	W	D	L	GF	GA	GD	Pts	Promotion
1	Athlone Town A.F.C.	27	19	1	7	42	22	+20	39	Promoted to Premier Division
2	Cobh Ramblers F.C.	27	17	4	6	41	24	+17	38	Promoted to Premier Division
3	Finn Harps F.C.	27	13	7	7	45	33	+12	33	
4	Home Farm F.C.	27	12	5	10	50	42	+8	29	
5	University College Dublin A.F.C.	27	9	7	11	37	36	+1	25	
6	Drogheda United F.C.	27	12	0	15	38	48	−10	24	
7	Longford Town F.C.	27	8	7	12	23	35	−12	23	
8	Monaghan United F.C.	27	7	7	13	34	43	−9	21	
9	Newcastlewest F.C.	27	7	5	15	36	42	−6	19	
10	E.M.F.A.	27	7	5	15	34	55	−21	19	

== See also ==
- 1987–88 League of Ireland Premier Division
