= Newcastle United (disambiguation) =

Newcastle United F.C. is an English men's professional association football club.

Newcastle United may also refer to:

- Newcastle KB United, a defunct Australian men's association football club
- Newcastle Rosebud United, former name used by Adamstown Rosebud FC, an Australian men's semi-professional association football club in Northern NSW
- Newcastle United, the original name of Newcastle West Town F.C., an Irish men's semi-professional association football club
- Newcastle Jets FC, an Australian men's professional association football club
- Newcastle Jets FC (women), an Australian women's semi-professional association football club
- Newcastle United W.F.C., an English women's semi-professional association football club
- Newcastle United F.C., former name of Gibraltarian semi-professional association football club Lincoln Red Imps F.C.

== See also ==
- Newcastle F.C., an intermediate association football club in Northern Ireland
