= John Toal =

John Toal may refer to:

- John Toal (broadcaster), BBC Radio Ulster and BBC Radio 3 presenter
- John Toal (association footballer), retired Shamrock Rovers midfielder
- John Toal (Gaelic footballer), Armagh player
