= League of Ireland Premier Division Manager of the Year =

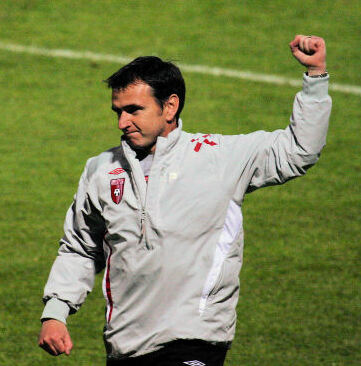
Fenlon has won the award four times in the last six years

The League of Ireland Premier Division Manager of the Year Award is an award handed out annually to a League of Ireland Premier Division manager, voted best in the league for that particular year. The last winner of the award was Pat Fenlon, who guided Bohemians to a league and cup double in 2008.

== Past winners ==
Year	Nationality	Player	Club	Notes	Ref(s)
2008	Ireland	Pat Fenlon	Bohemians	Winning the league and cup double with Bohemians.	
2007	Ireland	Paul Doolin	Drogheda United	Winning Drogheda's first ever Premier Division title.	
2006	Ireland	Pat Fenlon	Shelbourne	Manager of Shelbourne's last league-winning team	
2005	Ireland	Damien Richardson	Cork City	Cork's first league-winning manager for 12 years	
2004	Ireland	Pat Fenlon	Shelbourne	Reclaimed the title and progressed significantly in Europe	
2003	Ireland	Pat Fenlon	Shelbourne	Won league title with Shelbourne	
