= Padraig O'Connor =

Irish footballer

Pádraig O'Connor
Personal information
- Full name: Pádraig O'Connor
- Place of birth: Athlone, Ireland
- Position: Midfielder

Senior career*
Years	Team	Apps	(Gls)
1970—1972	St Patrick's Athletic	24	(3)
1972	Athlone Town	9	(1)
1972—1979	Bohemians	147	(11)
1979—1985	Athlone Town	166	(14)
1985—1986	St Patrick's Athletic	13	(0)
1986—1989	Athlone Town	70	(0)
1989—1990	Bohemians	4	(0)
- * Club domestic league appearances and goals

Padraig O'Connor was an Irish soccer player in the League of Ireland during the 1970s and 1980s.

He played for Bohemians from 1973 to 1978 winning 2 league titles and making 147 league appearances (8 as sub), scoring 11 goals. He also made 14 appearances in European competition for the club scoring 1 goal in the European Cup. He is the brother of Bohemian legend Turlough O'Connor and Michael O'Connor. O'Connor won the PFAI Players' Player of the Year award in the 1980–81 season, the first time it was awarded.

He had a spell as player/manager of Bohemians for the 1989–90 League of Ireland Premier Division season after the departure of Billy Young. He also managed Athlone Town previous to his spell in charge at Bohs.

O'Connor shared a testimonial with Tom Conway in May 1985.

In 2009, he was a Gaelic football coach, co-managing the Na Fianna under 15 team.
