= 1988–89 League of Ireland First Division =

League of Ireland First Division
- Season: 1988–89
- Champions: Drogheda United F.C.
- Promoted: UCD
- Top goalscorer: Pat O'Connor: 14 (Home Farm)

The 1988–89 League of Ireland First Division season was the fourth season of the League of Ireland First Division.

== Overview ==
The First Division was contested by 10 teams and Drogheda United F.C. won the division.

== Final table ==
Pos	Team	Pld	W	D	L	GF	GA	GD	Pts	Promotion
1	Drogheda United F.C.	27	16	7	4	38	22	+16	39	Promoted to Premier Division
2	University College Dublin A.F.C.	27	11	12	4	36	16	+20	34	Promoted to Premier Division
3	Bray Wanderers A.F.C.	27	13	8	6	41	25	+16	34	
4	Finn Harps F.C.	27	12	8	7	30	19	+11	32	
5	Home Farm F.C.	27	9	10	8	38	28	+10	28	
6	Newcastlewest F.C.	27	7	13	7	33	37	−4	27	
7	Monaghan United F.C.	27	6	11	10	28	42	−14	23	
8	Longford Town F.C.	27	9	5	13	25	43	−18	23	
9	E.M.F.A. (Note: E.M.F.A. changed their club name to Kilkenny City A.F.C. for the 1989–90 season.)	27	4	8	15	18	41	−23	16	
10	Sligo Rovers F.C.	27	4	6	17	23	37	−14	14	

== See also ==
- 1988–89 League of Ireland Premier Division
