= Limerick Desmond League =

Association football league (amateur, youth) in Ireland

- Founded: 1955
- Country: (Republic of Ireland) Ireland
- Provincial FA: Munster Football Association
- Divisions: Premier Division; Division 1 Division 2 Division 3 Youth Division 1 Youth Division 2 Under 17 Division 1 Under 17 Division 2
- Number of clubs: 58 (2017–18)
- Level on pyramid: 7–10
- Domestic cup(s): FAI Junior Cup; FAI Youth Cup
- League cup(s): Desmond Cup; Richard Hogan Cup; Riedy Cup
- Website: limerickdesmondfootballleague.com

The Limerick Desmond Football League (LDFL) is one of two association football leagues in County Limerick, along with the Limerick District League. Featuring amateur and junior clubs located west of the N20, the league also runs divisions at youth and Under-17 levels. Its top division, the Premier Division, is a seventh level division in the Republic of Ireland football league system. The name Desmond is historically associated with both Limerick and Munster, as it is derived from an anglicisation of the Irish place-name Deas-Mhumhna (meaning "South Munster"). (Note: See also the Kingdom of Desmond and the Earl of Desmond)

The headquarters of the league are located at Mick Hanley Park in Clounreask, Askeaton.

== History ==
The Limerick Desmond Football League (LDFL) was founded in January 1955 following a meeting at Desmond Castle in Newcastle West. In its early years, the league also included teams from County Kerry. Originally called the Desmond League – Desmond meaning South Munster in Irish – the founding members included Killonan F.C., Newcastle West A.F.C., Tralee Dynamos and A.F.C. Askeaton. These four teams contested the first league championship which was won by Killonan. They were joined by Killarney Athletic at the start of 1966.

The Desmond League was re-organised following a meeting in October 1966. Attended by the general secretary of the Football Association of Ireland (FAI), Joe Wickham, the reforms aimed to improve the league's structures and help increase its independence from the Limerick District Management Committee (LDMC), who ran the Limerick District League. By 1969, the league featured twenty teams including Celtic Rangers, Kilcolman Rovers and Glin Rovers. In 1971, Tralee Dynamos and Killarney Athletic left the Desmond League to become founder members of the Kerry District League. Celtic Rangers and Foynes became the two clubs who dominated the league in the early seventies. The league then lost both Newcastle West and Foynes to the LDMC's league.

Between 1978 and 1981, Kilcolman won four league titles in a row.

Recent seasons has seen the number of teams affiliated to the league and as a result, the number of divisions. The 2018/19 season saw the league reduced to three divisions (Premier Division, Division One, Division Two). The league also saw a number of club mergers. Killeany AFC merged with Bally Rovers to form Killeany/Bally Rovers FC. Also, Newcastle West Rovers and Newcastle West AFC merged to form Newcastle West Town. Adare United and Kilcornan merged at underage but at junior level AK United and Adare United remained separate entities.

In 2019/20, just three divisions of ten teams affiliated. Ferry Rangers, Ballysteen, Feenagh, Rockhill Rovers and Killeaney/Bally Rovers all withdrew from junior football. Mountcollins and a number of B teams took their place.

The league also entered the Oscar Traynor Trophy after a number of years absence.

== League pyramid ==
The league forms a division based on the number of applications from clubs. The aim is to create divisions with an even number of teams, therefore the format can be subject to change each year. Below is the format for the 2023–24 season:

County Level	League(s) / division(s)
1	Premier Division 8 clubs – 2 relegations
2	Division One 8 clubs – 2 promotions, 2 relegations
3	Division Two 8 clubs – 2 promotions, 1 relegation
4	Division Three 5 clubs – 1 promotion

== Teams ==
Premier Division (as of 2024/2025 season)

Team	Home town/suburb	Ground
Ballingarry A.F.C.	Ballingarry, County Limerick	Astropark Ballingarry
Breska Rovers A.F.C.	Clarina, County Limerick	
Broadford United	Broadford, County Limerick	
Creeves Celtic	Newbridge, County Limerick	
Glin Rovers	Glin, County Limerick	
Newcastle West	Newcastle West	Ballygowan Park
Rathkeale A.F.C.	Rathkeale	
St. Itas	Ashford, Kileedy	

== List of winners by season ==
As of 2022, former winners included:

Season	Winner	Runners-up
2021-22	Abbeyfeale Utd	Rathkeale
2020-21		
2018-19	Rathkeale	
2017–18	Abbeyfeale Utd	Rathkeale
2016–17	Rathkeale	Broadford Utd
2015–16	Abbeyfeale Utd	Broadford Utd
2014–15	Abbeyfeale Utd	Newcastle West Rovers
2013–14	Broadford Utd	Rathkeale
2012–13	Newcastle West AFC	
2011–12	Broadford Utd	
2010–11	Abbeyfeale Utd	Shannonside F.C.
2009–10	Rathkeale	Newcastle West
2008–09	Newcastle West	Abbyefeale Utd
2007–08	Newcastle West	Glin Rovers
2006–07	Abbeyfeale United	Kildimo United
2005–06	Newcastle West	Glin Rovers
2004–05	Rathkeale	Newcastle West
2003–04	Ballingarry	Rathkeale
2002–03	Broadford	Rathkeale
2001–02	Newcastle West	Broadford
2000–01	Newcastle West AFC	
1999–00	Abbeyfeale	Newcastle West
1998–99	Rathkeale	Newcastle West
1997–98	Foynes	Rathkeale
1996–97	Rathkeale	Newcastle West
1995–96	Rathkeale	Newcastle West
1994–95	Rathkeale	St.Bens
1993–94	Askeaton	Abbey United
1992–93	Newcastle West	Askeaton
1991–92	Newcastle West	Villa Rovers
1990–91	Newcastle West	
1989–90	Newcastle West	
1988–89	Rathkeale	
1987–88	Askeaton	
1986–87	Park Utd	
1985–86	Glin Rovers	
1984–85	Askeaton	
1983–84	Askeaton	
1982–83	Kilcolman Rovers	
1981–82	Askeaton	
1980–81	Kilcolman Rovers	
1979–80	Kilcolman Rovers	
1978–79	Kilcolman Rovers	
1977–78	Kilcolman Rovers	
1976–77	Shannon United	
1975–76	Broadford	
1974–75	Foynes	
1973–74	Foynes	
