= 1987–88 League of Ireland Premier Division =

League of Ireland Premier Division
- Season: 1987–88
- Champions: Dundalk F.C. (7th title)
- Relegated: Bray Wanderers; Sligo Rovers
- European Cup: Dundalk F.C.
- UEFA Cup: St Patrick's Athletic
- UEFA Cup Winners' Cup: Derry City
- Top goalscorer: Jonathan Speak:24 (Derry City)

The 1987–88 League of Ireland Premier Division was the third season of the League of Ireland Premier Division. The Premier Division was made up of 12 teams.

== Overview ==
The Premier Division was contested by 12 teams and Dundalk F.C. won the championship.

== Final Table ==
Pos	Team	Pld	W	D	L	GF	GA	GD	Pts	Qualification or relegation
1	Dundalk (C)	33	19	8	6	54	32	+22	46	Qualification to 1988–89 European Cup
2	St Patrick's Athletic	33	18	9	6	52	25	+27	45	Qualification to 1988–89 UEFA Cup
3	Bohemians	33	17	11	5	57	32	+25	45	
4	Shamrock Rovers	33	16	9	8	53	30	+23	41	
5	Galway United	33	15	10	8	48	34	+14	40	
6	Waterford United	33	10	14	9	40	31	+9	34	
7	Cork City	33	12	10	11	41	47	−6	34	
8	Derry City	33	13	5	15	59	44	+15	31	Qualification to 1988–89 European Cup Winners' Cup (Note: Derry City qualified for the 1988–89 European Cup Winners' Cup after reaching the 1987–88 FAI Cup final.)
9	Limerick City	33	9	7	17	33	60	−27	25	
10	Shelbourne	33	8	8	17	31	44	−13	24	
11	Bray Wanderers (R)	33	4	10	19	27	65	−38	18	Relegation to League of Ireland First Division
12	Sligo Rovers (R)	33	4	5	24	30	81	−51	13	Relegation to League of Ireland First Division

Source: www.rsssf.com
(C) Champions; (R) Relegated

== Results ==
=== Matches 1–22 ===
Home \ Away	BOH	BRW	COR	DER	DUN	GAL	LIM	SHM	SHE	SLI	StP	WAT
Bohemians	—	1–1	5–1	3–1	3–2	0–0	3–0	1–4	1–0	4–2	2–0	0–0
Bray Wanderers	0–4	—	1–3	0–1	2–3	1–3	0–0	1–3	0–1	3–3	1–3	0–0
Cork City	2–2	2–1	—	1–0	0–2	1–3	1–0	0–0	2–1	3–1	0–0	1–2
Derry City	3–2	0–0	7–2	—	3–0	3–0	5–0	0–1	0–0	4–0	0–3	1–2
Dundalk	0–0	2–0	3–1	2–0	—	2–1	2–1	1–1	3–1	1–0	0–2	1–0
Galway United	1–1	2–0	1–1	3–1	1–0	—	0–2	3–2	0–2	5–1	1–0	2–2
Limerick City	0–2	0–0	1–1	2–2	0–3	3–0	—	1–4	2–0	1–0	0–3	2–1
Shamrock Rovers	1–1	7–1	2–2	2–1	0–1	1–0	2–0	—	0–1	2–1	0–2	1–1
Shelbourne	1–3	1–1	1–2	0–1	0–2	1–1	4–1	1–2	—	1–1	1–0	0–2
Sligo Rovers	3–2	1–2	0–2	0–3	2–2	1–0	1–2	2–0	1–0	—	1–3	1–7
St Patrick's Athletic	2–2	0–1	3–0	3–0	2–2	0–0	4–1	2–0	2–1	4–2	—	1–1
Waterford United	0–1	1–1	1–2	3–1	2–3	1–1	1–1	0–0	2–1	3–0	0–1	—

Legend: Blue = home team win; Yellow = draw; Red = away team win.

=== Matches 23–33 ===
Home \ Away	BOH	BRW	COR	DER	DUN	GAL	LIM	SHM	SHE	SLI	StP	WAT
Bohemians	—	1–0	—	—	—	0–1	2–0	1–1	—	3–2	—	—
Bray Wanderers	—	—	—	—	—	1–2	—	1–3	1–2	—	—	—
Cork City	0–1	1–1	—	—	1–1	—	0–0	—	—	—	0–1	3–0
Derry City	0–1	6–0	0–1	—	—	—	3–2	—	0–3	—	—	—
Dundalk	0–2	5–1	—	3–2	—	—	4–0	—	—	—	1–1	1–1
Galway United	—	—	3–1	1–1	2–0	—	—	—	1–0	3–1	2–2	—
Limerick City	—	3–0	—	—	—	1–5	—	0–4	5–0	2–0	—	—
Shamrock Rovers	—	—	2–0	1–3	0–1	0–0	—	—	2–0	2–0	—	—
Shelbourne	2–2	—	1–1	—	0–1	—	—	—	—	—	2–0	1–1
Sligo Rovers	—	0–3	0–3	2–7	0–0	—	—	—	1–1	—	0–1	0–2
St Patrick's Athletic	1–0	1–1	—	1–0	—	—	3–0	1–1	—	—	—	0–2
Waterford United	1–1	0–1	—	0–0	—	1–0	0–0	0–2	—	—	—	—

Legend: Blue = home team win; Yellow = draw; Red = away team win.

== See also ==
- 1987–88 League of Ireland First Division
