= 1994–95 League of Ireland First Division =

League of Ireland First Division
- Season: 1994–95
- Champions: UCD
- Promoted: Drogheda United
- Top goalscorer: Michael O'Byrne: 14 (UCD); Philip Power: 14 (Home Farm)

The 1994–95 League of Ireland First Division season was the 10th season of the League of Ireland First Division. The division was contested by 10 teams and University College Dublin A.F.C. finished as champions. UCD completed a First Division double having already won the League of Ireland First Division Shield. Drogheda United finished as runners up in both competitions.

== Shield ==
The League of Ireland First Division Shield saw the 10 participating teams divided into two groups of five – a Northern Group and a Southern Group. The teams played a single round of games against the other teams in their group.

=== Final tables ===
==== Northern Group ====
Pos	Team	Pld	W	D	L	GF	GA	GD	Pts	Qualification
1	Drogheda United F.C.	4	3	0	1	9	4	+5	9	Qualified for Shield final
2	Finn Harps F.C.	4	2	2	0	6	4	+2	8	
3	Sligo Rovers F.C. (Note: RSSSF lists Sligo Rovers F.C. as entering Shield in place of St James's Gate F.C.)	4	1	2	1	5	6	−1	5	
4	Bray Wanderers A.F.C.	4	1	0	3	7	7	0	3	
5	Longford Town F.C.	4	0	2	2	3	9	−6	2	

==== Southern Group ====
Pos	Team	Pld	W	D	L	GF	GA	GD	Pts	Qualification
1	University College Dublin A.F.C.	4	3	1	0	11	3	+8	10	Qualified for Shield final
2	Waterford United F.C.	4	2	1	1	7	5	+2	7	
3	Home Farm F.C.	4	1	1	2	4	6	−2	4	
4	Limerick F.C.	4	1	1	2	7	10	−3	4	
5	Kilkenny City A.F.C.	3	1	0	2	3	8	−5	3	

=== Final ===
The two group winners, UCD and Drogheda United, played off in a two legged final.

=== 1st leg ===
25 October 1994	UCD	0–0	Drogheda United

=== 2nd leg ===
30 October 1994	Drogheda United	1–2	UCD
	O'Connor		O'Byrne; Palmer

UCD won 2-1 on aggregate.

== Regular season ==
=== Final table ===
Pos	Team	Pld	W	D	L	GF	GA	GD	Pts	Promotion or qualification
1	University College Dublin A.F.C.	27	20	4	3	56	12	+44	64	Promoted to Premier Division
2	Drogheda United F.C.	27	16	8	3	48	23	+25	56	Promoted to Premier Division
3	Finn Harps F.C.	27	12	7	8	44	30	+14	43	Lost promotion/relegation play-off
4	Limerick F.C.	27	11	10	6	30	22	+8	43	
5	Waterford United F.C.	27	11	8	8	31	24	+7	41	
6	Home Farm F.C. (Note: Home Farm F.C. changed their club name to Home Farm Everton F.C. for the 1995–96 season after agreeing a sponsorship deal with Everton F.C.)	27	9	6	12	43	47	−4	33	
7	Longford Town F.C.	27	8	9	10	26	39	−13	33	
8	Bray Wanderers A.F.C.	27	8	8	11	33	31	+2	32	
9	St James's Gate F.C.	27	4	10	13	35	49	−14	22	
10	Kilkenny City A.F.C.	27	0	2	25	14	83	−69	2	

== Promotion/relegation play-off ==
Third placed Finn Harps F.C. played off against Athlone Town who finished in tenth place in the 1994–95 League of Ireland Premier Division. The winner would compete in the 1995–96 League of Ireland Premier Division.

=== 1st leg ===
Finn Harps F.C.	0–0	Athlone Town

=== 2nd leg ===
Athlone Town	0–0	Finn Harps F.C.

Athlone Town won 5–3 on penalties and retain their place in the Premier Division

== See also ==
- 1994–95 League of Ireland Premier Division
