= Ballingarry A.F.C. =

Soccer club in County Limerick, Ireland

Coordinates: 52°28′11″N 8°52′11″W

- Full name: Ballingarry Association Football Club
- Short name: Ballingarry
- Founded: February 1984 (42 years ago)
- Ground: The Paddocks, Ballingarry, County Limerick
- Capacity: 200 (seated)
- League: Limerick Desmond League
- Website: www.ballingarryafc.com
Home colours

Ballingarry Association Football Club is an amateur Irish football (soccer) club from Ballingarry, County Limerick, Ireland. Founded in 1984, their senior men's team competes in the Limerick Desmond League.

== History ==
Ballingarry Association Football Club was formed in February 1984. The club decided to enter a team in the Limerick Desmond League for the 1984–85 season and chose yellow and green as the club's colours. Their first home ground was known as the ‘Canon's Field’ after the land was secured by an archdeacon. The club's first team started at Division 2B of the league and their first competitive game was held on 2 September 1984. The match, played away in Askeaton against the local B team, ended with a 4–3 victory. At the end of the 2025–26 season, Ballingarry won the Limerick Desmond League for the first time in 22 years.

== Club crest ==
Following the club's Annual General Meeting in June 1989, a suggestion to create a crest for Ballingarry A.F.C. was proposed and agreed. The crest is divided into three sections, with the top scroll showing the name of the club and the year of formation.

The middle section consists of a shield subdivided into three parts and joined by a football. The top half of the shield references Knockfierna hill, a local landmark. A lion is depicted in the bottom left, a symbol taken from the De Lacy family crest. The De Lacy family were the owners of Ballingarry Castle, which is displayed in the lower right half.

The bottom scroll contains the club motto in Latin, "Meritis Augentur Honores", meaning "Rewards increase with effort".

== Ground ==
The club play their home games at the Paddocks.

By August 1998, the first spectator stand in the ground had been built. 200 seats were installed in 2022 and the stand was also renamed the James Clancy Stand after club secretary and founding member, James Clancy. In 2025, the club began the process of resurfacing the grass pitch with artificial turf.

The ground also houses a separate 50m x 22m artificial turf pitch, referred to as Astropark Ballingarry. The pitch was renovated in August 2020 and is used for training, 5-a-side and 7-a-side games.

== Roll of honour ==
Ballingarry A.F.C. has had several successes in the Desmond League. The first silverware won was when the team won the Division 3 League title for season 1985/86. Further success came with victory in the Munster Junior Area Cup in 1988/89. Other competitions and honours won by the club include:

- 1985/86 – Division 3 League Champions
- 1987 – Park United Tournament Winners
- 1988/89 – Munster Junior Cup Area Winners
- 2001/02 – Desmond Cup Winners
- 2002/03 – Division 1 League Champions
- 2003/04 – Premier Division League Champions (won play-off)
- 2006/07 – Desmond Cup Winners
- 2007/08 – Division 1 Double Winners (League & League Cup)
- 2008/09 – Division 3 League Champions (B Team)

== Notable players ==
Republic of Ireland U21 internationals

- (Republic of Ireland) Anthony Forde
