= 1990–91 League of Ireland First Division =

League of Ireland First Division
- Season: 1990–91
- Champions: Drogheda United
- Promoted: Bray Wanderers
- Top goalscorer: Jim Barr:12 (Monaghan United); Con McLoughlin:12 (Finn Harps)

The 1990–91 League of Ireland First Division season was the sixth season of the League of Ireland First Division.

== Overview ==
The First Division was contested by 10 teams and Drogheda United F.C. won the division.

== Final table ==
Pos	Team	Pld	W	D	L	GF	GA	GD	Pts	Promotion
1	Drogheda United F.C.	27	15	11	1	38	14	+24	41	Promoted to Premier Division
2	Bray Wanderers A.F.C.	27	16	6	5	40	17	+23	38	Promoted to Premier Division
3	Cobh Ramblers F.C.	27	12	8	7	31	20	+11	32	
4	Finn Harps F.C.	27	14	4	9	40	30	+10	32	
5	St James's Gate F.C. (Note: St James's Gate F.C. replaced Newcastlewest F.C.)	27	13	3	11	37	38	−1	29	
6	University College Dublin A.F.C.	27	11	5	11	32	25	+7	27	
7	Kilkenny City A.F.C.	27	7	11	9	29	32	−3	25	
8	Home Farm F.C.	27	5	7	15	26	46	−20	17	
9	Longford Town F.C.	27	5	7	15	20	44	−24	17	
10	Monaghan United F.C.	27	4	4	19	27	54	−27	12	

== See also ==
- 1990–91 League of Ireland Premier Division
