= 1990–91 League of Ireland Premier Division =

Former sixth season of the Ireland Premier Division

League of Ireland Premier Division
- Season: 1990–91
- Champions: Dundalk F.C. (8th title)
- Relegated: Waterford United; Limerick City
- European Cup: Dundalk F.C.
- UEFA Cup: Cork City
- UEFA Cup Winners' Cup: Galway United
- Top goalscorer: Peter Hanrahan:18 (Dundalk)

The 1990–91 League of Ireland Premier Division was the sixth season of the League of Ireland Premier Division. The Premier Division was made up of 12 teams.

== Overview ==
The Premier Division was contested by 12 teams and Dundalk F.C. won the championship.

== Final Table ==
Pos	Team	Pld	W	D	L	GF	GA	GD	Pts	Qualification or relegation
1	Dundalk (C)	33	22	8	3	52	17	+35	52	Qualification to 1991–92 European Cup
2	Cork City	33	19	12	2	45	18	+27	50	Qualification to 1991–92 UEFA Cup
3	St Patrick's Athletic	33	17	10	6	46	21	+25	44	
4	Shelbourne	33	18	6	9	59	30	+29	42	
5	Sligo Rovers	33	13	12	8	34	22	+12	38	
6	Shamrock Rovers	33	14	9	10	51	37	+14	37	
7	Derry City	33	13	9	11	51	28	+23	35	
8	Galway United	33	9	5	19	34	61	−27	23	Qualification to 1991–92 European Cup Winners' Cup (Note: Galway United qualified for the 1991–92 European Cup Winners' Cup after winning the 1990–91 FAI Cup final.)
9	Bohemians	33	7	8	18	27	42	−15	22	
10	Athlone Town	33	6	7	20	22	53	−31	19	
11	Waterford United (R)	33	6	5	22	22	62	−40	17	Relegation to League of Ireland First Division
12	Limerick City (R)	33	6	5	22	21	73	−52	17	Relegation to League of Ireland First Division

Source: www.rsssf.com
(C) Champions; (R) Relegated

== Results ==
=== Matches 1–22 ===
Home \ Away	ATH	BOH	COR	DER	DUN	GAL	LIM	SHM	SHE	SLI	StP	WAT
Athlone Town	—	3–0	1–1	1–4	0–1	0–1	0–1	0–2	0–5	0–2	1–1	1–1
Bohemians	0–1	—	0–1	0–0	0–2	3–0	2–0	2–3	1–0	0–2	0–1	1–1
Cork City	2–0	1–0	—	1–1	1–1	1–0	1–0	1–1	0–0	1–0	0–0	1–0
Derry City	5–0	1–1	0–0	—	0–1	6–1	1–0	0–0	2–0	1–1	0–1	6–2
Dundalk	3–0	4–1	0–0	1–0	—	2–0	3–0	0–0	1–5	0–2	3–0	0–0
Galway United	0–2	1–0	1–3	3–1	2–3	—	1–2	2–4	2–1	0–2	0–4	2–1
Limerick City	0–0	0–2	1–6	0–4	0–4	0–3	—	2–1	0–4	1–1	2–1	1–2
Shamrock Rovers	0–0	0–2	4–0	1–1	0–0	2–0	4–1	—	2–3	2–1	0–0	3–1
Shelbourne	0–0	1–1	0–2	1–0	1–2	3–1	5–0	3–0	—	2–1	1–2	4–0
Sligo Rovers	1–0	1–0	0–1	0–0	2–0	3–1	1–1	2–1	2–2	—	0–0	1–0
St Patrick's Athletic	3–0	2–0	1–1	1–0	0–0	4–0	3–0	2–1	1–1	2–0	—	2–0
Waterford United	3–1	1–1	0–2	0–2	1–3	0–1	1–0	0–3	0–1	0–1	0–5	—

Legend: Blue = home team win; Yellow = draw; Red = away team win.

=== Matches 23–33 ===
Home \ Away	ATH	BOH	COR	DER	DUN	GAL	LIM	SHM	SHE	SLI	StP	WAT
Athlone Town	—	1–0	—	—	1–3	2–2	—	—	0–1	1–2	2–1	—
Bohemians	—	—	1–1	—	—	0–0	—	1–2	0–1	1–1	2–1	—
Cork City	2–1	—	—	—	0–1	1–0	2–2	0–0	—	—	—	2–0
Derry City	0–1	2–1	1–3	—	0–1	—	—	—	—	—	1–0	—
Dundalk	—	3–0	—	—	—	2–0	—	—	2–0	—	0–0	1–0
Galway United	—	—	—	2–1	—	—	4–1	0–1	3–5	—	—	1–1
Limerick City	1–0	2–3	—	0–2	0–3	—	—	0–3	—	—	—	0–2
Shamrock Rovers	3–1	—	—	2–5	1–2	—	—	—	—	0–0	2–4	—
Shelbourne	—	—	0–2	1–0	—	—	3–1	1–0	—	1–1	—	3–0
Sligo Rovers	—	—	1–2	0–0	0–0	0–0	0–1	—	—	—	—	3–0
St Patrick's Athletic	—	—	0–3	—	—	0–0	1–1	—	1–0	1–0	—	—
Waterford United	2–1	2–1	—	1–4	—	—	—	0–3	—	—	0–1	—

Legend: Blue = home team win; Yellow = draw; Red = away team win.

== See also ==
- 1990–91 League of Ireland First Division
