= League of Ireland Premier Division =

Irish association football league

League of Ireland Men's Premier Division
- Founded: 1985; 41 years ago
- Country: (Republic of Ireland) Ireland (9 teams)
- Other club from: Northern Ireland (1 team)
- Confederation: UEFA (Europe)
- Number of clubs: 10
- Level on pyramid: 1
- Relegation to: League of Ireland First Division
- Domestic cup(s): FAI Cup; President's Cup
- International cup(s): UEFA Champions League; UEFA Europa League; UEFA Conference League
- Current champions: Shamrock Rovers (11th title) (2026)
- Most championships: Shamrock Rovers (11 titles)
- Broadcasters: LOITV (Worldwide); Virgin Media (Ireland)
- Website: leagueofireland.ie
- Current: 2026 League of Ireland Premier Division

The League of Ireland Men's Premier Division, commonly known as the League of Ireland Premier Division or simply the Premier Division, is a professional association football league in the Republic of Ireland, the top division of the League of Ireland, and the highest level of the Republic of Ireland football league system. It is organised and administrated by the Football Association of Ireland (FAI). Contested by ten clubs, it operates on a system of promotion and relegation with the League of Ireland First Division. Seasons usually run from February to November, with each team playing 36 matches: four against each other team, two home and two away.

Formed in 1985 following a restructuring of the League of Ireland, the Premier Division replaced the old single-division format as the national top flight. Shamrock Rovers won the first two Premier Division titles and, as of the end of the 2025 season, hold a record 10 League of Ireland Premier Divisions and 22 Irish top-flight championships. The league has been won on two occasions by Northern Ireland-based club Derry City, the presence of which within the league makes it a cross-border competition. St Patrick's Athletic and Bohemians are the only current League of Ireland clubs never to have been relegated from the Premier Division.

For sponsorship reasons the league has carried the title SSE Airtricity Men's Premier Division since 2010, continuing a series of naming-rights deals dating back to the early 1990s.

Rising attendances, increased television and streaming coverage, and improved performances in European competition in the early 2020s have led to the Premier Division being described as one of the fastest-growing domestic leagues in UEFA's middle tier, with a 20% increase in aggregate attendance between 2022 and 2023 and further growth into 2024 and 2025. The 2025 season became the first year that the league was entirely made up of full-time professional clubs and players.

== History ==
=== Origins ===
Organised league football in the Irish republic dates to the foundation of the League of Ireland in 1921, following a split from the Belfast-based Irish Football Association (IFA). For over six decades the League of Ireland operated as a single-division competition. By the early 1980s, concerns about standards, fixture congestion, and a lack of competitive balance led the FAI and the clubs to explore the creation of a two-tier national structure.

In 1985 the League of Ireland was reorganised into a 12-team Premier Division and a 10-team First Division. The Premier Division became the national top tier, with promotion and relegation between the two divisions introduced from the outset. Derry City, who were based in Northern Ireland and had been admitted to the First Division in 1985, subsequently gained promotion to the Premier Division in 1987, giving the new league a cross-border dimension with the support of FIFA and the IFA.

=== Formation and early years (1980s) ===
The inaugural Premier Division in 1985–86 was made up of the top 12 teams from the 1984–85 League of Ireland and included the League of Ireland's traditional powers – Shamrock Rovers, Shelbourne, Bohemians and Dundalk. Shamrock Rovers, who had already won the final two championships of the old League of Ireland era, claimed the first two Premier Division titles and completed a record run of four consecutive league championships from 1983–84 to 1986–87.

Dundalk were champions in 1987–88 and Derry City achieved a treble in 1988–89 by also winning the League of Ireland Cup and the FAI Cup. However, throughout this period attendances and facilities remained uninspiring, European victories were rare, and most clubs continued to operate with part-time squads.

=== Consolidation and Dublin revival (1990s and 2000s) ===
The 1990s saw the re-emergence of St Patrick's Athletic following years of obscurity. They won four league titles between 1989–90 and 1998–99, and became synonymous with attacking, possession-based football under Brian Kerr, Pat Dolan, and Liam Buckley. Cork City claimed their first championship in 1992–93 after a dramatic three-way play-off series with Shelbourne and Bohemians, underlining the increasing geographic spread of the title race.

In the late 1990s and early 2000s Shelbourne and Bohemians became the league's leading clubs. Shelbourne won five titles between 1999–2000 and 2005. They won the 2001–02 title in controversial circumstances, being declared champions after St Patrick's Athletic were deducted 15 points for fielding Charles Livingstone Mbabazi while he was ineligible. Bohemians completed a league and cup double in 2000–01 and added further championships in 2002–03 and 2008.

In May 2001 the League of Ireland clubs voted in favour of switching from an autumn–spring calendar to a summer season running from March to October. The aim of this was to reduce fixture clashes with English football on television, boost attendances as well as commercial and marketing opportunities, improve playing conditions, and encourage better preparation for the teams competing in European competition. The change occurred in the 2003 League of Ireland Premier Division, with the season beginning in March and finishing at the end of October. This eight and a half month season was preceded by a short, concentrated season in 2002–03 from July to January, the first featuring a ten-team Premier Division.

Pat Fenlon, who had been a prominent player for Shelbourne from 1997–2002, had significant success as a manager in the period after the switch to summer football. He won titles with Shelbourne in 2003, 2004 and 2006, before guiding Bohemians to league success in 2008 and 2009. Cork City denied Shelbourne a third league title in a row when they claimed their second title in 2005, defeating fellow challengers Derry City in a final-game decider at Turners Cross.

Financial instability became a recurring theme during the second half of the decade. Shamrock Rovers entered examinership in 2005 after it was revealed that the club had debts of nearly €3 million. It was also discovered that Rovers were not paying PAYE and PRSI taxes. As a result of these financial irregularities, they were deducted eight points, ultimately resulting in the club being relegated to the First Division after they lost the relegation/promotion playoff to Dublin City. This was the first time Rovers' senior team had dropped out of the top level of the Republic of Ireland football league system since the club had joined the League of Ireland in 1922–23.

During the 2006 season the Revenue Commissioners took High Court action and threatened to have Shelbourne wound up after the club failed to pay more than €104,000 in outstanding taxes. Shelbourne also struggled to pay their players during the season. Despite winning the title, Shelbourne were subsequently demoted to the First Division due to their financial difficulties. Midway through the season Dublin City also went out of business and withdrew from the league, unable to complete the season.

During the 2008 season both Cork City and Drogheda United were deducted ten points after going into administration.

Following the conclusion of the 2009 season both Derry City and Cork City were expelled from the League of Ireland. Derry City were accused of making extra payments to players using unofficial secondary contracts. This was against league rules which placed limits on the amount clubs could spend on players' wages. Cork City had been in serious financial difficulties for several seasons and its holding company was eventually wound up by the High Court. However, both clubs were effectively reformed and subsequently allowed to join the 2010 First Division. These crises prompted reforms to licensing and financial regulation within the league.

=== Dundalk and Cork City era (2010s) ===
The early 2010s opened with Shamrock Rovers winning back-to-back titles in 2010 and 2011 under Michael O'Neill. In 2011 Rovers also became the first team in League of Ireland history to qualify for the group stages of the UEFA Europa League. In 2012, Sligo Rovers won their first Premier Division title and their first top level title in thirty five years. St. Patrick's Athletic won their fifth Premier Division in 2013.

From 2014 the balance of power shifted decisively to Dundalk. Under Stephen Kenny, Dundalk won four titles in five seasons between 2014 and 2018. They were renowned for playing an attractive possession-based style, scoring the most Irish top-flight league goals in history in 2015 with 78, and setting a Premier Division record of 87 points in 2018.

In 2016 Dundalk emulated Shamrock Rovers by reaching the Europa League group stage. A draw away to AZ Alkmaar in their opening game saw them gain the first point for an Irish club in the Europa League group stage, and they followed this up with a win over Maccabi Tel-Aviv, becoming the first Irish team to earn a European group stage victory.

Cork City emerged as Dundalk's main rival, finishing runners-up three years in succession before winning the league and cup double in 2017.

In contrast, three Premier Division clubs – Sporting Fingal, Galway United and Monaghan United – all withdrew from the League of Ireland due to financial difficulties. Sporting Fingal subsequently went out of business completely.

=== Shamrock Rovers dominance and recent developments (2020s) ===
Shamrock Rovers re-established themselves as the league's dominant club in the 2020s. Under Stephen Bradley they won four consecutive titles from 2020 to 2023, matching their own national record for successive championships and extending their all-time tally of top-flight titles to 21.

Rovers were also successful in navigating the qualifying rounds of UEFA club competition on numerous occasions. They appeared in the group phase of the 2022–23 UEFA Europa Conference League, the league phase of the 2024–25 UEFA Conference League, and the league phase of the 2025–26 UEFA Conference League. In their 2024–25 UEFA Conference League campaign, they became the first Irish side to qualify for the knockout stages of European competition.

The 2024 title race was widely regarded as one of the most exciting in League of Ireland history, concluding with Shelbourne ending Rovers' run by winning their first title in 18 years under former Republic of Ireland winger Damien Duff. At the other end of the table Dundalk were relegated after 16 consecutive seasons in the top flight. Shamrock Rovers responded to Shelbourne's victory in 2024 by reclaiming the championship in 2025, their fifth title in six seasons.

Throughout this period the league experienced a sharp rise in attendances and profile off the pitch. A 2023 UEFA report placed the Premier Division 28th among 54 European top flights by aggregate crowd and highlighted a 20% year-on-year increase in attendances, while an FAI-commissioned study by BDO estimated the overall value of the League of Ireland to the Irish economy at €164.7million per year. In 2024 the League of Ireland reported that attendances across its three national divisions passed 500,000 by the mid-season break for the first time.

The 2025 season marked the first time that every club in the Premier Division operated on a full-time professional basis, a status change viewed as essential for competing more successfully in UEFA competitions and retaining talented young players for longer. A league match between Bohemians and Shamrock Rovers which was held at the Aviva Stadium in February 2025 set an all-time League of Ireland attendance record with 33,208 spectators.

Two of the leagues players would represent their countries at the 2026 FIFA World Cup, Shamrock Rovers' Irish born defender Pico Lopes was called up to the Cape Verde Squad for their World Cup debut and St Patrick's Athletic Goalkeeper Joseph Anang will represent Ghana while former Sligo Rovers defender Nando Pijnaker will play for New Zealand.

== Corporate structure ==
The Premier Division forms the top tier of the League of Ireland, which is owned and administered by the FAI through its League of Ireland department headquartered at the National Sports Campus in Abbotstown, Dublin.

The League of Ireland Director, currently Mark Scanlon, leads a small central staff responsible for competition management, commercial rights, broadcast deals and strategic development, while each member club is a separate legal entity.

Most Premier Division clubs are privately owned companies limited by guarantee or by shares, though several – including Shamrock Rovers, Bohemians and Sligo Rovers – have significant supporter ownership and community-based shareholding structures. Two clubs – Drogheda United and Waterford – operate within a multi-club ownership model.

Clubs negotiate their own sponsorships and player contracts but must comply with FAI Club Licensing regulations aligned with UEFA's Club Licensing and Financial Sustainability framework.

The Premier Division shares some commercial arrangements with the other men's and women's national leagues under a single League of Ireland brand, including the title sponsorship with SSE Airtricity and partnerships with EA Sports, Virgin Media, Extra.ie, and Evoke.ie.

=== Criticism of governance ===
Governance of the League of Ireland has attracted periodic criticism. The financial crises of the 2000s, which saw several prominent clubs enter examinership or collapse, led to accusations that licensing rules were too weak and inconsistently enforced.

In 2019 the wider governance crisis within the FAI, which required a government-brokered rescue package, prompted concerns within the league that the financial stability of the association and its domestic competitions were interdependent.

Successive reviews have recommended greater independence for the League of Ireland in its strategic decision-making and revenue generation. Advocates of reform have argued for a separate league company under the overall authority of the FAI, while others have proposed an all-island league in cooperation with the Northern Ireland Football League. In response, the FAI has emphasised investment in league academies and facilities, backed by increased state funding, as a key pillar in its strategic plan for the 2020s.

== Competition format ==
=== Competition ===
The Premier Division is contested by ten clubs. Each club plays every other club four times over the course of the season, twice at home and twice away, for a total of 36 matches per team and 180 league fixtures in all. Seasons follow a spring-to-autumn calendar, typically beginning in mid-February and ending in late October or early November; this format was adopted in 2003.

Clubs receive three points for a win, one point for a draw and no points for a defeat. Teams are ranked by total points, then by goal difference and goals scored. If teams remain level, head-to-head record is used, with points scored in the matches between the teams taking priority over away goals scored in those matches.

=== Promotion and relegation ===
The Premier Division operates a one-up, one-down promotion and relegation system with the League of Ireland First Division, supplemented by a promotion/relegation play-off. The club finishing tenth in the Premier Division is relegated automatically and replaced by the First Division champions. The ninth-placed Premier Division club plays the winners of the First Division promotion play-offs; the victor takes a place in the following season's Premier Division.

In 1992–93 a promotion/relegation play-off was also introduced. In 2008 Cobh Ramblers were relegated directly from the Premier Division to the 2009 A Championship after they failed to obtain a First Division license. In 2017, to even up the numbers of clubs in the Premier Division and First Division to 10 teams each, the bottom three Premier League teams were relegated and only the First Division champion were promoted.

=== Video assistant referee ===
Unlike the majority of European leagues, the League of Ireland has not introduced the video assistant referee system in domestic league fixtures as of the 2025 season. VAR has been used in some UEFA club competition matches involving Irish clubs at Tallaght Stadium and Tolka Park, but the costs of installing the necessary technology in all Premier Division grounds and training match officials to UEFA standards have been cited as barriers to adoption. Debate has taken place within Irish football about whether the benefits of VAR – such as correcting clear errors in major decisions – justify the financial outlay and potential impact on the flow of games in relatively small, atmospheric stadia. League officials have indicated that VAR could be introduced in phases if sufficient funding became available.

== Clubs ==
Twenty-four clubs have played in the League of Ireland Premier Division from its inception in 1985, up to and including the 2025 season.

=== Champions ===
As of 2025, nine clubs have been crowned champions in the Premier Division era: Shamrock Rovers, Dundalk, Shelbourne, Bohemians, St Patrick's Athletic, Cork City, Sligo Rovers, Derry City and Drogheda United.

Shamrock Rovers are the most successful club with 10 championships, followed by Dundalk and Shelbourne with 8 and 7 respectively. Shamrock Rovers have had two extended eras of dominance: in the mid-1980s and again in the early 2020s. Dundalk's sustained success in the 2010s and Shelbourne's strong run in the late 1990s and early 2000s underpin their tallies.

By club

| Club | Titles | Seasons |
|---|---|---|
| Shamrock Rovers | 11 | 1985–86, 1986–87, 1993–94, 2010, 2011, 2020, 2021, 2022, 2023, 2025, 2026 |
| Dundalk | 8 | 1987–88, 1990–91, 1994–95, 2014, 2015, 2016, 2018, 2019 |
| Shelbourne | 7 | 1991–92, 1999–00, 2001–02, 2003, 2004, 2006, 2024 |
| St Patrick's Athletic | 5 | 1989–90, 1995–96, 1997–98, 1998–99, 2013 |
| Bohemians | 4 | 2000–01, 2002–03, 2008, 2009 |
| Cork City | 3 | 1992–93, 2005, 2017 |
| Derry City | 2 | 1988–89, 1996–97 |
| Sligo Rovers | 1 | 2012 |
| Drogheda United | 1 | 2007 |

By province

| Province | Championships | Clubs |
|---|---|---|
| Leinster | 36 | Shamrock Rovers (11), Dundalk (8), Shelbourne (7), St Patrick's Athletic (5), Bohemians (4), Drogheda United (1) |
| Munster | 3 | Cork City (3) |
| Ulster | 2 | Derry City (2) |
| Connacht | 1 | Sligo Rovers (1) |

By county

| County | Championships | Clubs |
|---|---|---|
| County Dublin | 27 | Shamrock Rovers (11), Shelbourne (7), St Patrick's Athletic (5), Bohemians (4) |
| County Louth | 9 | Dundalk (8), Drogheda United (1) |
| County Cork | 3 | Cork City (3) |
| County Londonderry | 2 | Derry City (2) |
| County Sligo | 1 | Sligo Rovers (1) |

By city/town

| City / Town | Championships | Clubs |
|---|---|---|
| Dublin | 27 | Shamrock Rovers (11), Shelbourne (7), St Patrick's Athletic (5), Bohemians (4) |
| Dundalk | 8 | Dundalk (8) |
| Cork | 3 | Cork City (3) |
| Derry | 2 | Derry City (2) |
| Sligo | 1 | Sligo Rovers (1) |
| Drogheda | 1 | Drogheda United (1) |

By season

| Season | Champions | Runners-up | Third place |
|---|---|---|---|
| 1985–86 | Shamrock Rovers | Galway United | Dundalk |
| 1986–87 | Shamrock Rovers | Dundalk | Bohemians |
| 1987–88 | Dundalk | St Patrick's Athletic | Bohemians |
| 1988–89 | Derry City | Dundalk | Limerick City |
| 1989–90 | St Patrick's Athletic | Derry City | Dundalk |
| 1990–91 | Dundalk | Cork City | St Patrick's Athletic |
| 1991–92 | Shelbourne | Derry City | Cork City |
| 1992–93 | Cork City | Bohemians | Shelbourne |
| 1993–94 | Shamrock Rovers | Cork City | Galway United |
| 1994–95 | Dundalk | Derry City | Shelbourne |
| 1995–96 | St Patrick's Athletic | Bohemians | Sligo Rovers |
| 1996–97 | Derry City | Bohemians | Shelbourne |
| 1997–98 | St Patrick's Athletic | Shelbourne | Cork City |
| 1998–99 | St Patrick's Athletic | Cork City | Shelbourne |
| 1999–00 | Shelbourne | Cork City | Bohemians |
| 2000–01 | Bohemians | Shelbourne | Cork City |
| 2001–02 | Shelbourne | Shamrock | St Patrick's Athletic |
| 2002–03 | Bohemians | Shelbourne | Shamrock Rovers |
| 2003 | Shelbourne | Bohemians | Cork City |
| 2004 | Shelbourne | Cork City | Bohemians |
| 2005 | Cork City | Derry City | Shelbourne |

| Season | Champions | Runners-up | Third place |
|---|---|---|---|
| 2006 | Shelbourne | Derry City | Drogheda United |
| 2007 | Drogheda United | St Patrick's Athletic | Bohemians |
| 2008 | Bohemians | St Patrick's Athletic | Derry City |
| 2009 | Bohemians | Shamrock Rovers | Cork City |
| 2010 | Shamrock Rovers | Bohemians | Sligo Rovers |
| 2011 | Shamrock Rovers | Sligo Rovers | Derry City |
| 2012 | Sligo Rovers | Drogheda United | St Patrick's Athletic |
| 2013 | St Patrick's Athletic | Dundalk | Sligo Rovers |
| 2014 | Dundalk | Cork City | St Patrick's Athletic |
| 2015 | Dundalk | Cork City | Shamrock Rovers |
| 2016 | Dundalk | Cork City | Derry City |
| 2017 | Cork City | Dundalk | Shamrock Rovers |
| 2018 | Dundalk | Cork City | Shamrock Rovers |
| 2019 | Dundalk | Shamrock Rovers | Bohemians |
| 2020 | Shamrock Rovers | Bohemians | Dundalk |
| 2021 | Shamrock Rovers | St Patrick's Athletic | Sligo Rovers |
| 2022 | Shamrock Rovers | Derry City | Dundalk |
| 2023 | Shamrock Rovers | Derry City | St Patrick's Athletic |
| 2024 | Shelbourne | Shamrock Rovers | St Patrick's Athletic |
| 2025 | Shamrock Rovers | Derry City | Shelbourne |
| 2026 | Shamrock Rovers | Bohemians | St Patrick's Athletic |

=== 2027 season ===
Ten clubs are due to compete in the 2027 League of Ireland Premier Division – the top eight from the previous season with two promoted from the First Division:

| 2027 Club | 2026 Position | First season in top division | First season in LOI Premier Division | Seasons in top division | Seasons in LOI Premier Division | First season of current spell in top division | No. of seasons of current spell in LOI Premier Division | Top division titles | Most recent top division title |
|---|---|---|---|---|---|---|---|---|---|
| Bohemians | 2nd | 1921–22 | 1985–86 | 107 | 43 | 1921–22 | 107 | 11 | 2009 |
| Cork City | 1st (FD) | 1984–85 | 1985–86 | 39 | 39 | 2027 | 1 | 3 | 2017 |
| Dundalk | 6th | 1926–27 | 1985–86 | 90 | 32 | 2026 | 2 | 14 | 2019 |
| Derry City | 5th | 1987–88 | 1987–88 | 40 | 40 | 2011 | 17 | 2 | 1996–97 |
| Galway United | 8th | 1977–78 | 1985–86 | 20 | 10 | 2024 | 4 | 0 | N/A |
| Shamrock Rovers | 1st | 1922–23 | 1985–86 | 103 | 42 | 2007 | 20 | 23 | 2026 |
| Shelbourne | 4th | 1921–22 | 1985–86 | 91 | 29 | 2022 | 6 | 13 | 2024 |
| St Patrick's Athletic | 3rd | 1951–52 | 1985–86 | 76 | 43 | 1951–52 | 76 | 9 | 2013 |
| UCD | 2nd (FD) | 1979–80 | 1985–86 | 30 | 24 | 2027 | 1 | 0 | N/A |
| Waterford | 7th | 1930–31 | 1985–86 | 76 | 19 | 2024 | 4 | 6 | 1972–73 |

- Sligo Rovers and Drogheda United were relegated to the First Division for the 2027 season, while Cork City, as winners, and UCD, through the Promotion/Relegation playoff final, were promoted from the 2026 season.

=== Seasons in Irish top flight ===
Bohemians are the only club to have competed in every season of the top-flight division since its formation in 1921.

=== Seasons in Premier Division ===
Since the creation of the Premier Division in 1985, Bohemians and St Patrick's Athletic are the only current clubs never to have been relegated from the top tier.

== International competitions ==
=== Qualification for European competitions ===
Qualification for UEFA club competitions is determined by the final league table placings and the result of the FAI Cup, as well as by the Republic of Ireland's position in the UEFA coefficient rankings over the previous five seasons. For the 2026–27 UEFA season, the Republic of Ireland is projected to be ranked 31st in Europe with a five-year coefficient of 14.968, following a record-breaking 2024–25 campaign in which League of Ireland clubs earned 21.375 points (an average of 5.343) in UEFA competitions. This position elevates the FAI Cup winners into the UEFA Europa League first qualifying round and confirms a total of four European places for Irish clubs in 2026–27.

The league champions qualify for the subsequent season's UEFA Champions League first qualifying round. The champions enter the Champions Path and, if eliminated, can drop into the UEFA Europa League and then UEFA Europa Conference League qualifying rounds depending on which stage they exit. The FAI Cup winners qualify for the subsequent season's UEFA Europa League first qualifying round – since the national cup is open to clubs from all divisions, the Europa League place is awarded to the cup winners regardless of their domestic tier, provided they meet UEFA licensing and eligibility criteria.. The second-placed team in the Premier Division qualifies for the subsequent season's UEFA Conference League second qualifying round, and the third-placed team in the Premier Division qualifies for the UEFA Conference League first qualifying round.

If the FAI Cup winners also finish in one of the league positions that would otherwise qualify for Europe, the places are reallocated down the Premier Division table. If the cup winners finish second or third in the league, the vacant Europa Conference League place is passed to the team finishing fourth. If the cup winners complete a league–and–cup double, the league runners-up are promoted into the Europa League first qualifying round, and the clubs finishing third and fourth enter into the UEFA Europa Conference League second and first qualifying rounds respectively.

As with other European leagues, the number of places and the entry round for League of Ireland clubs are subject to change in line with UEFA competition reforms and fluctuations in the UEFA association coefficient rankings. In addition, clubs must obtain a UEFA licence and may be refused entry on regulatory grounds, for example under UEFA’s multi-club ownership rules.

=== Performance in international competition ===
A total of 13 clubs from the Premier Division have represented the Republic of Ireland in UEFA competitions since 1985. Cork City were the first Premier Division club to progress through a round, when they eliminated Cwmbrân Town on away goals rule in the 1993–94 UEFA Champions League preliminary round. Shelbourne became the first Premier Division club to win two consecutive European ties when they defeated KR and Hajduk Split in the 2004–05 UEFA Champions League first and second qualifying rounds before they were eliminated by Deportivo La Coruña in the third qualifying round.

A breakthrough moment came in 2011–12, when league champions Shamrock Rovers defeated Partizan Belgrade 3–2 on aggregate in the UEFA Europa League play-off round to become the first Irish club to reach the group stage of a major UEFA competition.

Dundalk matched and extended this achievement in 2016–17. They advanced through two rounds of UEFA Champions League qualifying, defeating FH and BATE Borisov, before losing to Legia Warsaw in the play-off and dropping into the UEFA Europa League group stage. In the Europa League they recorded the first points ever earned by a League of Ireland club at group-stage level, drawing 1–1 away to AZ Alkmaar before beating Maccabi Tel Aviv 1–0 at Tallaght Stadium.

Dundalk returned to the UEFA Europa League group stage in 2020–21, qualifying via the Champions Path after dropping out of the UEFA Champions League in the first qualifying round. Shamrock Rovers subsequently reached the group stage of the newly created UEFA Europa Conference League in 2022–23, taking two points from a group that included Djurgårdens, Molde and Gent.

In the 2024–25 season Shamrock Rovers again qualified for the UEFA Europa Conference League, this time in the new league-phase format. They finished tenth in the 36-team table and progressed to the knockout round play-off before being eliminated by Molde on penalties. During that season they amassed a total of 14.375 coefficient points – the highest ever single-season contribution by a League of Ireland club.

The following season Drogheda United became the first club in history to be expelled from UEFA competition for breaching their regulations around multi-club ownership. In August 2025 Shelbourne became the third Premier Division side to qualify for the UEFA Conference League league phase/group stage. On the same night, Shamrock Rovers became the first team to qualify for the UEFA Conference League league phase without starting in the Champions Path.

== Sponsorship ==
League naming rights have been a feature of the Premier Division since the early 1990s. There have been four sponsors since the league's formation.

| Period | Sponsor | Brand |
|---|---|---|
| 1991–1996 | Bord Gáis | Bord Gáis National League Premier Division |
| 1996–1999 | Harp Lager | Harp Lager National League Premier Division |
| 1999–2008 | Eircom | Eircom Premier League |
| 2009 | No sponsor | League of Ireland Premier Division |
| 2010–2013 | SSE Airtricity | Airtricity League Premier Division |
| 2014–present | SSE Airtricity | SSE Airtricity League Premier Division |

The league has a number of official partners and suppliers including EA Sports (title sponsor of the LOI Academies and associate sponsor of the League of Ireland), Virgin Media and Off The Ball (broadcast partners), Extra.ie and Evoke.ie (both official media partners of the League of Ireland and Sports Direct Men's FAI Cups), Rockshore (official beer of the League of Ireland), and Club (official soft drink partner of the League of Ireland). The official ball supplier for the league is Umbro – the ball which will be used in the 2026 season is the Swerve Pro Laminar. In addition to the title sponsor, individual clubs maintain their own shirt sponsorships and commercial partnerships.

== Finances ==
=== Revenue ===
Compared with major European leagues, the Premier Division operates on a modest financial scale. Clubs derive revenue from gate receipts, local and national sponsorships, central league distributions, merchandising and prize money from domestic and European competitions. €125,000 is paid to the Premier Division champions. Each Premier Division club in 2024 earned €356,399 in UEFA solidarity funding.

A 2024 BDO report commissioned by the FAI estimated that the League of Ireland generated €164.7million in economic activity and directly employed over 1,600 people, with match-day spending by supporters providing significant local economic benefits.

Qualification for UEFA competitions can represent a transformative revenue source. Participation in the league or group phases of Europa League and Conference League has brought substantial central payments and increased visibility to the clubs involved.

=== Costs and wages ===
Player and staff wages, combined with stadium operating costs, account for the bulk of Premier Division club expenditure. Historically, several clubs overspent in pursuit of success, contributing to the financial crises of the 2000s. Modern licensing rules require audited accounts and place limits on overdue payables, but there is no formal salary cap beyond UEFA's financial sustainability regulations.

In the mid-2020s some Premier Division clubs have reported operating losses despite rising attendances, reflecting increased investment in full-time squads and academy structures. In 2025 Shelbourne chief executive Tomás Quinn warned that cumulative losses of around €3.5million over three seasons were unsustainable without continued owner support, even as the club enjoyed on-field success.

=== Comparison with other leagues ===
UEFA benchmarking reports and independent analyses place the League of Ireland in the lower half of Europe's top divisions by aggregate revenue but note relatively strong recent growth from a low base. A UEFA report referenced by Irish media in 2024 ranked the League of Ireland 28th out of 54 top flights for aggregate attendance and 25th for average attendance, with a 20% year-on-year increase between 2022 and 2023.

While financial disparities with the major European leagues remain stark, the combination of rising crowds, improved television and streaming deals and stronger youth development has led some analysts to view the League of Ireland as a potential growth market for investors, particularly given Ireland's young population and strong interest in football.

== Media coverage ==
The first league game to be broadcast live was on RTÉ2 as they showed the Tolka Park meeting of Shelbourne and Derry City during the 1996–97 season. League of Ireland matches continued to be intermittently shown live on RTÉ Two and, for a period, on Setanta Sports. Eircom League Weekly, hosted by Trevor Welch, was a weekly highlights package for the league running from 2002–2007 on TV3. In 2008, RTÉ gained the rights for a highlights programme, first broadcasting Monday Night Soccer until 2013, followed by Soccer Republic from 2014–2021. RTÉ subsequently scrapped their highlights show, explaining that this was a necessary step to allow them to fund the streaming of more matches. In January 2025, Virgin Media Television secured a four-year deal worth around €500,000 per season to become the exclusive free-to-air broadcaster of the Premier Division in the Republic of Ireland, committing to show at least one live game from each round as well as highlights programming.

In addition to domestic television coverage, league matches are streamed globally via the LOITV platform, which offers individual match passes and season-long subscriptions. The BDO economic impact report highlighted a "massive jump" in streaming viewership between 2022 and 2023, reflecting both diaspora interest and improved production standards.

Irish and UK newspapers, websites and radio stations provide varying levels of coverage of the Premier Division, with outlets such as RTÉ, BBC Northern Ireland, Newstalk, the Irish Independent, the Irish Times, The 42, and Extratime.com carrying regular match reports, analysis and features. In February 2025, Off The Ball signed an exclusive national radio deal which saw the radio and online broadcaster air 30 live Premier Division matches across that season. As well as the live broadcasts, their coverage also featured a weekly League of Ireland podcast, LOI Late Night on X Spaces along with pre and post-match analysis on Off The Ball’s morning and evening shows.

== Stadia and Attendance Figures ==
Premier Division clubs play at a mix of traditional inner-city grounds and more modern municipal stadiums, with capacities between 3,500 and 10,547. Tallaght Stadium, home of Shamrock Rovers, is the largest regular venue with an all-seated capacity of 10,547. Occasional league and European fixtures have been held at the 51,700-capacity Aviva Stadium.

Many grounds have undergone phased redevelopment in the 21st century, including Dalymount Park, the Brandywell, Turners Cross and the Showgrounds, though the FAI and League of Ireland officials have acknowledged that stadium infrastructure has not kept pace with rising demand. Plans for further redevelopments – such as the redevelopment of Dalymount Park, the redevelopment of the Showgrounds, and Drogheda United's proposed new stadium – form part of wider discussions about state investment in sports facilities.

| Season | Total | Average | Highest | Ref. |
|---|---|---|---|---|
| 2005 | – | – | 7,000 | |
| 2006 | 257,745 | 1,562 | 6,080 | |
| 2007 | – | – | – | |
| 2008 | – | – | 6,870 | |
| 2009 | – | – | 6,000 | |
| 2010 | – | – | 5,500 | |
| 2011 | 290,340 | 1,613 | 5,916 | |
| 2012 | 281,925 | 1,575 | 6,097 | |
| 2013 | 307,355 | 1,552 | 4,703 | |
| 2014 | 295,384 | 1,523 | 6,219 | |
| 2015 | 324,332 | 1,638 | 6,900 | |
| 2016 | 291,258 | 1,471 | 5,453 | |
| 2017 | 377,362 | 1,906 | 6,983 | |
| 2018 | 384,520 | 2,136 | 6,672 | |
| 2019 | 375,705 | 2,087 | 7,021 | |
| 2020 | 65,700 | 2,986 | 7,522 | (Note: Total attendance and average attendance figures only account for the first four weeks of the season after which no spectators were allowed due to the COVID-19 pandemic) |
| 2021 | – | – | 7,765 | |
| 2022 | 486,365 | 2,687 | 7,726 | |
| 2023 | 596,196 | 3,294 | 8,021 | |
| 2024 | 628,020 | 3,490 | 10,094 | |
| 2025 | 683,208 | 3,775 | 33,208 | |

Key
| | Record high |
| | Record low |
| * | Affected by the COVID-19 pandemic |

== Managers ==
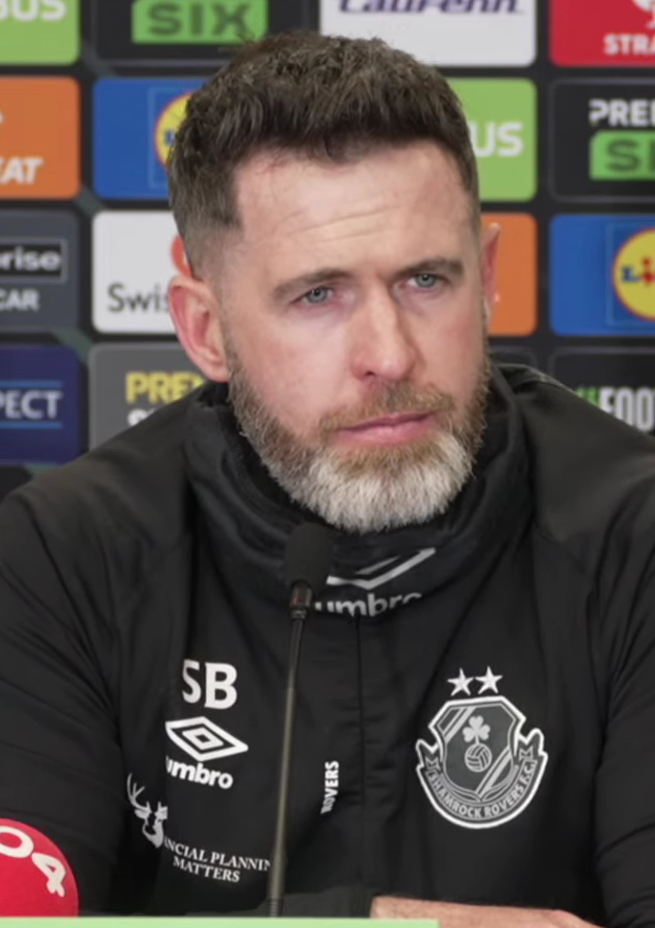
The joint most successful manager in the League of Ireland Premier Division era is Stephen Bradley, winning five titles with Shamrock Rovers.

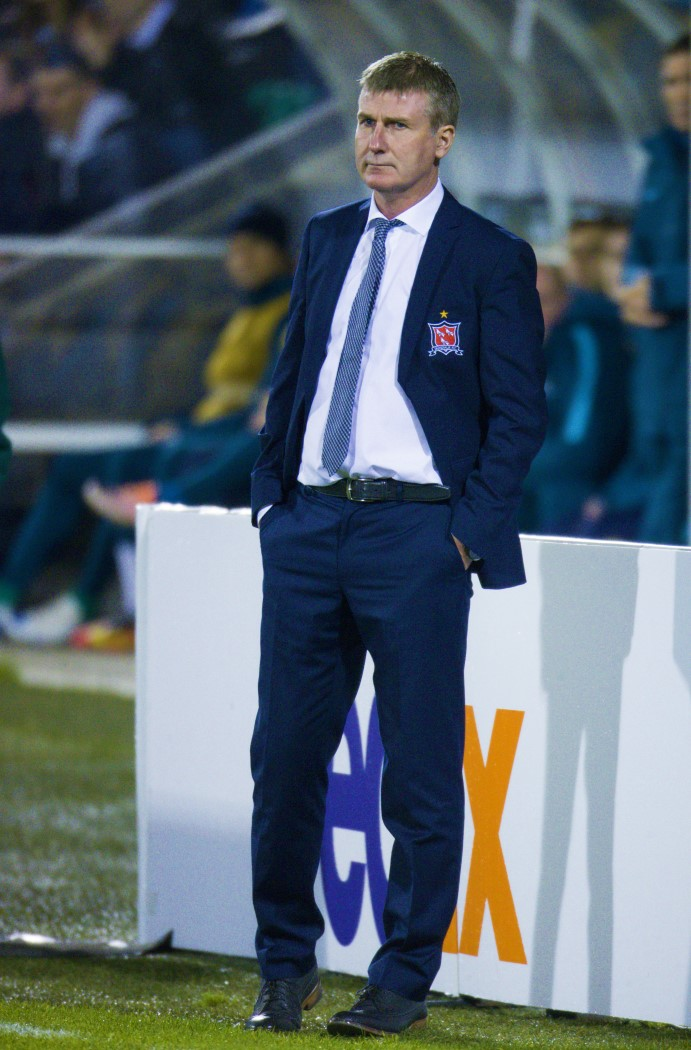
Stephen Kenny has also lifted the trophy on five occasions, once with Bohemians and four times with Dundalk.

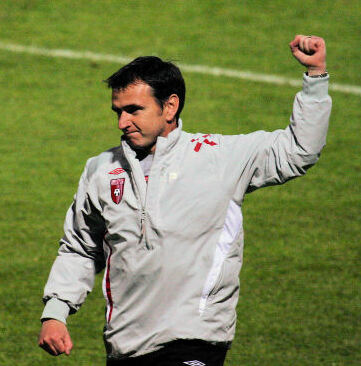
Pat Fenlon also has five titles to his name – three with Shelbourne and two with Bohemians.

The Premier Division has produced a number of notable international managers. Stephen Kenny, who guided Dundalk to four league titles and the Europa League group stage, later became manager of the Republic of Ireland men's national football team. Brian Kerr, twice league winner at St. Patrick's Athletic, also managed the Republic of Ireland national team. Michael O'Neill, former Shamrock Rovers manager, went on to manage the Northern Ireland men's national football team at their first European Championship finals, Euro 2016. Lawrie Sanchez began his managerial career at Sligo Rovers before later managing the Northern Ireland national team to an all-time high position of 27th in the FIFA World Rankings.

Domestically, other successful managers have included Pat Fenlon (Bohemians and Shelbourne), Stephen Bradley (Shamrock Rovers), Dermot Keely (Shelbourne), and Jim McLaughlin (Shamrock Rovers, Derry City, and Shelbourne). Damien Duff, at Shelbourne from 2021–2025, has perhaps been the highest profile manager in the history of the league, and was credited with increasing the profile and visibility of the league both at home and abroad. Other former Republic of Ireland internationals who have managed in the league include Paddy Mulligan, Turlough O'Connor, Pat Byrne, Synan Braddish, Eoin Hand, Mick Leech, Mick Lawlor, Paul McGee, Damien Richardson, Liam Buckley, Ray Treacy, Pat Scully, Noel Synnott, Gareth Farrelly, Jeff Kenna, Colin Healy, Mark Kinsella, Kevin Sheedy, and Joey O'Brien. Former Northern Ireland internationals to have managed in the league include Jim McLaughlin, Billy Hamilton, Roy Coyle, Tony O'Doherty, Felix Healy, Lawrie Sanchez, Michael O'Neill, and Jim Magilton.

Maciej Tarnogrodzki was the first person from outside Ireland or Britain to manage in the league when he was appointed at Bray Wanderers in 2015. Ian Baraclough remains the only manager from outside the island of Ireland to have won the league, doing so with Sligo Rovers in 2012.

=== Current managers ===
Current League of Ireland Premier Division managers
| Manager | Nationality | Club | Appointed | Time as manager |
|---|---|---|---|---|
| Stephen Bradley | Ireland | Shamrock Rovers | 7 July 2016 | 10 years, 126 days |
| John Caulfield | Ireland | Galway United | 21 August 2020 | 6 years, 81 days |
| William O'Connor | Ireland | UCD | 1 January 2024 | 2 years, 313 days |
| Alan Reynolds | Ireland | Bohemians | 26 March 2024 | 2 years, 229 days |
| Stephen Kenny | Ireland | St Patrick's Athletic | 16 May 2024 | 2 years, 178 days |
| Ciarán Kilduff | Ireland | Dundalk | 6 November 2024 | 2 years, 4 days |
| Barry Robson | Scotland | Cork City | 10 January 2026 | 304 days |
| Graham Coughlan | Ireland | Waterford | 6 May 2026 | 188 days |
| John Russell | Ireland | Shelbourne | 13 July 2026 | 120 days |
| Mark Connolly (interim) | Ireland | Derry City | 5 August 2026 | 97 days |

=== List of wins by manager ===
| Club | Titles | Seasons |
|---|---|---|
| (Republic of Ireland) Stephen Bradley | 6 | 2020, 2021, 2022, 2023, 2025, 2026 |
| (Republic of Ireland) Stephen Kenny | 5 | 2002–03, 2014, 2015, 2016, 2018 |
| (Republic of Ireland) Pat Fenlon | 5 | 2003, 2004, 2006, 2008, 2009 |
| (Republic of Ireland) Dermot Keely | 4 | 1986–87, 1994–95, 1999–00, 2001-02 |
| (Northern Ireland) Jim McLaughlin | 3 | 1985–86, 1988–89, 1991–92 |
| (Republic of Ireland) Liam Buckley | 2 | 1998–99, 2013 |
| (Northern Ireland) Michael O'Neill | 2 | 2010, 2011 |
| (Republic of Ireland) Brian Kerr | 2 | 1989–90, 1995–96 |
| (Republic of Ireland) Turlough O'Connor | 2 | 1987–88, 1990–91 |
| (Republic of Ireland) Damien Duff | 1 | 2024 |
| (Republic of Ireland) Vinny Perth | 1 | 2019 |
| (Republic of Ireland) John Caulfield | 1 | 2017 |
| (England) Ian Baraclough | 1 | 2012 |
| (Republic of Ireland) Paul Doolin | 1 | 2007 |
| (Republic of Ireland) Damien Richardson | 1 | 2005 |
| (Republic of Ireland) Roddy Collins | 1 | 2000–01 |
| (Republic of Ireland) Pat Dolan | 1 | 1997–98 |
| (Northern Ireland) Felix Healy | 1 | 1996–97 |
| (Republic of Ireland) Ray Treacy | 1 | 1993–94 |
| (Republic of Ireland) Noel O'Mahony | 1 | 1992–93 |

== Players ==
=== Appearances ===
Peter Hutton holds the record for most appearances in the League of Ireland Premier Division, playing 530 top-flight matches between 1990 and 2009 for Derry City, his hometown club, and Shelbourne.

Most appearances
| Rank | Player | Apps |
|---|---|---|
| 1 | Peter Hutton (NIR) | 530 |
| 2 | Gary Rogers (IRL) | 517 |
| 3 | Ronan Finn (IRL) | 457 |
| 4 | John Caulfield (IRL) | 455 |
| 5 | Jason Byrne (IRL) | 447 |
| 6 | **Aaron Greene (IRL)** | 437 |
| 7 | Owen Heary (IRL) | 436 |
| 8 | Alan McNally (IRL) | 427 |
| 9 | Ian Bermingham (IRL) | 420 |
| 10 | Ollie Cahill (IRL) | 419 |
As of 29 June 2026; Italicised players still playing professional football. **Bolded** players still playing in Premier Division.

=== Transfer regulations and foreign players ===
Player registrations in the League of Ireland Premier Division are governed by FIFA and FAI regulations on transfer windows and registration periods. The competition operates with two registration windows each year: a longer pre-season window before the start of the domestic campaign – 1st December until 22nd February (inclusive) – and a shorter mid-season window in the summer – 1st July to 28th July. Outside these windows, transfers are generally not permitted except in limited cases such as the signing of unattached players or emergency goalkeepers.

Players from countries within the European Economic Area have no restrictions placed upon their registration as per the freedom of movement for workers. For players from outside the EEA, League of Ireland clubs rely on Ireland’s employment permit system. Non-EEA professional footballers require a Sport and Cultural Employment Permit, issued by the Department of Enterprise, Tourism and Employment, to work in the State. These permits are intended to facilitate “the employment in the State of foreign nationals with the relevant qualifications, skills, experience or knowledge for the development, operation and capacity of sporting and cultural activities”.

To obtain such a permit, the applicant and club must meet a number of criteria:

- The player must be employed and paid directly by the club, which must be a registered Irish employer and comply with employment law.
- The club’s workforce must be at least 50% EEA nationals at the time of application, reflecting broader Irish employment-permit rules designed to prevent an over-reliance on non-EEA workers.
- The player’s remuneration must be at or above the Irish National Minimum Wage, and the permit is normally granted for up to two years initially, with the possibility of renewal.

In addition to this, FAI regulations permit that clubs can only sign four players who are from a country outside the EEA or UK. The current system stipulates that only non-EEA or non-UK players who have played the majority of games of the previous season in either a top-flight or second tier league can obtain a work permit, however in October 2025 the National League Executive Committee agreed to review and relax these criteria.

Changes in British work-permit rules after Brexit have altered traditional migration patterns for Irish players. Whereas many young Irish footballers previously moved to British academies as teenagers, post-Brexit restrictions on signing under-18 foreign players has put an end to such moves. This has encouraged some prospects to remain longer in the League of Ireland system, allowing Premier Division clubs to benefit from and showcase local talent before any move abroad, however transfers to continental Europe are now potentially seen as more attractive than before.

=== Top scorers ===
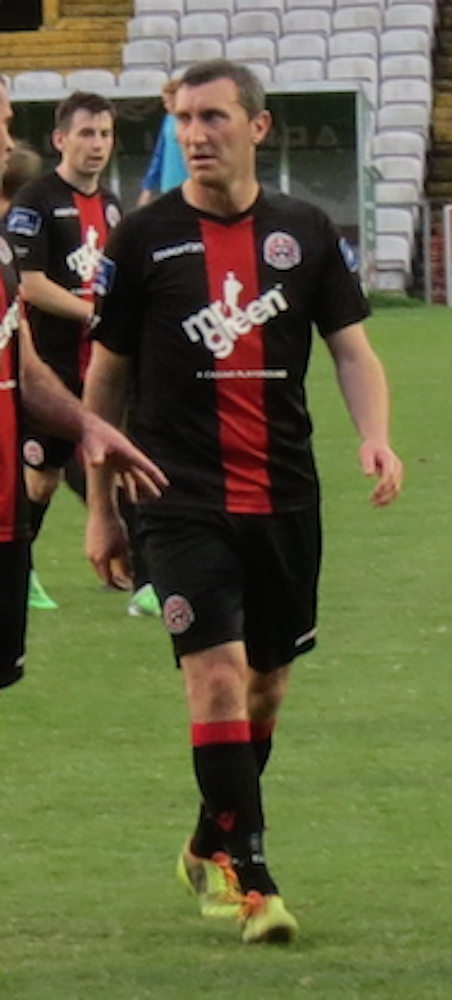
Jason Byrne is the top scorer in League of Ireland Premier Division history with 210 goals.

As of 29 June 2026.

| Rank | Player | Years | Goals | Apps | Ratio |
|---|---|---|---|---|---|
| 1 | (Republic of Ireland) Jason Byrne | 1998, 2000–2006, 2008–2015 | 210 | 447 | 0.47 |
| 2 | (Republic of Ireland) Pat Morley | 1985–1988, 1989–2002 | 172 | 409 | 0.42 |
| 3 | (Republic of Ireland) Glen Crowe | 1999–2010 | 160 | 360 | 0.44 |
| 4 | (Republic of Ireland) Stephen Geoghegan | 1989–1991, 1992–2003 | 139 | 314 | 0.44 |
| 5 | (Republic of Ireland) Patrick Hoban | 2013–2014, 2018–2025 | 136 | 269 | 0.51 |
| 6 | (Republic of Ireland) John Caulfield | 1986–2001 | 129 | 455 | 0.28 |
| 7 | (Republic of Ireland) Declan O'Brien | 2002–2009, 2012–2014 | 103 | 285 | 0.36 |
| 8 | (Republic of Ireland) **Aaron Greene** | 2009–2015, 2017– | 96 | 437 | 0.22 |
| 9 | (Republic of Ireland) David McMillan | 2008, 2010–2017, 2020–2022 | 92 | 277 | 0.33 |
| 10 | (Republic of Ireland) **Michael Duffy** | 2012–2015, 2017- | 87 | 328 | 0.27 |

Italics denotes players still playing professional football,
Bold denotes players still playing in the Premier Division.

=== Wages ===
When the Premier Division was created in 1985 most League of Ireland players remained semi-professional, combining football with other employment and receiving comparatively modest match fees and expenses. Contemporary accounts of the domestic game in the 1980s and early 1990s describe a culture of part-time training and limited pay, with players often expected to report for work the morning after league fixtures. When Shelbourne won the league in 1992, it cost the equivalent of €250,000 to run the club, with the players' wages accounting for approximately €112,000 of that. At the time, a total of two players were employed as full-time professionals, and wages were paid for the duration of the playing season only, which was roughly 40 weeks.

The early 2000s saw a rapid move towards full-time professionalism at leading clubs, underpinned by Ireland’s Celtic Tiger economic boom. Clubs such as Shelbourne, Bohemians, Cork City, Drogheda United, Derry City, and St Patrick’s Athletic assembled full-time squads, and wage inflation accelerated sharply. When Shelbourne completed the league and cup double in 2000, the cost of running the club had risen to €750,000, there were still only two full-time players, but all staff were paid for the 52 weeks of the year. Players' wages accounted for approximately €528,000 that season. By 2004, when Shelbourne had progressed to a totally full-time setup, the cost of running the club had risen to €1.8m, with players' wages accounting for almost half of that figure. During this era, some leading Premier Division players at clubs such as Cork City, Drogheda United and St Patrick’s Athletic were reportedly earning between €4,000 and €5,000 per week. In the Celtic Tiger boom years, wages in the league rose around ten times faster than the industrial average between 2005 and 2008.

The global financial crisis and the collapse of the Irish property boom in 2008–09 brought this period of aggressive spending to an abrupt end. Several Premier Division clubs entered examinership, administration or liquidation, and wage bills were slashed across the division. By 2010, only Bohemians and Sporting Fingal were operating as fully professional clubs, with most of the league reverting to part-time status and many players either moving on, or accepting significantly reduced terms or short-term contracts. The Professional Footballers’ Association of Ireland responded by organising off-season training camps for out-of-contract players and highlighting the insecurity of wages in the domestic game. In the 2010s, wage levels stabilised at a lower base and the league entered what was described as a “false market” era, in which some clubs were sustained by benefactor funding while others rebuilt on more modest, sustainable budgets.

From around 2020 onwards, rising attendances, improved commercial deals and increased UEFA solidarity payments began to feed through into higher wage bills. A 2024 analysis of club accounts reported that total revenue at Premier Division level in 2022 had reached approximately €26 million, with wage spending of about €15 million and gate receipts accounting for 26 per cent of income. In 2022 the PFAI and FAI agreed to introduce a minimum wage for senior professional players: from the 2023 season, full-time players aged 20 and over became entitled to at least €430 per week, with a minimum of €130 per week for registered part-time professionals.

This minimum translated to an annual salary of €22,360, with most Premier Division professionals earning in the region of €27,000–€50,000 per year and a small number of leading players on six-figure contracts. Prior to the 2023 season, Shelbourne manager Damien Duff noted that “a player with a lot [of] experience in the league that has a bit of quality costs €1,200 a week”, equating to about €62,400 per year for a leading Premier Division regular.

By the mid-2020s, Premier Division wage levels were generally regarded as being at or near their highest in the history of the league. All clubs in the 2025 Premier Division employed full-time professional squads for the first time, marking the formal end of the semi-professional era at the top tier. In the same season it was reported that between five and ten players in the league earned €150,000-a-year and that, while the lowest earner in the Premier Division earned around €400-a-week, the overwhelming majority of players earned at least twice that amount. Furthermore, the PFAI highlighted that clubs were agreeing substantial performance-related bonuses in player contracts, offering between €1,000 and €3,000 for players who make the Team of the Year, with clauses worth between €5,000 and €7,000 being inserted to reward the overall Player of the Year. A compensation survey from the Economic Research Institute estimated the average annual salary for a professional football player in Ireland in 2025 at around €42,461, with typical earnings falling between roughly €31,000 and €51,000. Prior to the 2026 season, the minimum wage for professional footballers was increased further, on a rising scale ranging from €300 per week for 16 and 17-year-olds, up to €450 per week for players aged 20 and over. With the vast majority of professional players earning well above the minimum wage, particularly those aged 20 and above, this increase was primarily viewed as a protection for young players.

While basic salaries remain modest compared to those on offer in Europe’s top leagues, the combination of a collectively agreed minimum wage, increasing numbers of full-time contracts, growing prize money from UEFA competitions and rising match-day and broadcast revenues has substantially improved the earning power and job security of League of Ireland Premier Division players relative to earlier decades.

=== Player transfer fees ===
Top transfer fees paid by League of Ireland Premier Division clubs
| Rank | Player | Fee (€ thousand) | Year | Transfer | | Reference(s) |
|---|---|---|---|---|---|---|
| 1 | Odhrán Casey (NIR) | €115 | 2026 | (Northern Ireland) Cliftonville | (Republic of Ireland) Shelbourne | |
| 2 | Eamon Zayed (LBY) | €80 | 2006 | (Republic of Ireland) Bray Wanderers | (Republic of Ireland) Drogheda United | |
| 3 | John McGovern (NIR) | €78 | 2025 | (Northern Ireland) Dungannon Swifts | (Republic of Ireland) Shamrock Rovers | |
| 4 | Will Fitzgerald (IRL) | €75 | 2026 | (Republic of Ireland) Sligo Rovers | (Republic of Ireland) Shamrock Rovers | |
| 4 | Jason Byrne (IRL) | €75 | 2003 | (Republic of Ireland) Bray Wanderers | (Republic of Ireland) Shelbourne | |
| 5 | Matt Healy (IRL) | €70 | 2025 | (Belgium) Francs Borains | (Republic of Ireland) Shamrock Rovers | |
| 6 | Trevor Molloy (IRL) | €51 | 2000 | (Republic of Ireland) St Patrick's Athletic | (Republic of Ireland) Bohemians | |
| 7 | Conan Noonan (IRL) | €50 | 2025 | (Republic of Ireland) Shamrock Rovers | (Republic of Ireland) Waterford | |
| 8 | Kevin Holt (SCO) | €48 | 2025 | (Scotland) Dundee United | (Republic of Ireland) Derry City | |
| 9 | Jamie McGonigle (NIR) | €41 | 2021 | (Northern Ireland) Crusaders | (Republic of Ireland) Derry City | |
| 10 | Rodrigo Freitas (POR) | €40 | 2026 | (Portugal) Varzim | (Republic of Ireland) Shelbourne | |
| 10 | Conor Carty (IRL) | €40 | 2025 | (Republic of Ireland) St Patrick's Athletic | (Republic of Ireland) Waterford | |
| 10 | Dylan Connolly (IRL) | €40 | 2017 | (Republic of Ireland) Bray Wanderers | (Republic of Ireland) Dundalk | |
| 10 | Kieran Sadlier (IRL) | €40 | 2017 | (Republic of Ireland) Sligo Rovers | (Republic of Ireland) Cork City | |

Top transfer fees received by League of Ireland Premier Division clubs
| Rank | Player | Fee (€ million) | Year | Transfer | | Reference(s) |
|---|---|---|---|---|---|---|
| 1 | Victor Ozhianvuna (IRL) | €2 (Note: Initial €2 million plus agreed a reported potential €2 million in bonuses) | 2025 | (Republic of Ireland) Shamrock Rovers | (England) Arsenal | |
| 2 | Mason Melia (IRL) | €1.8 (Note: Initial €1.8 million plus agreed a reported potential €2.4 million in bonuses) | 2025 | (Republic of Ireland) St Patrick's Athletic | (England) Tottenham Hotspur | |
| 3 | Liam Scales (IRL) | €0.6 | 2021 | (Republic of Ireland) Shamrock Rovers | (Scotland) Celtic | |
| 4 | Gavin Bazunu (IRL) | €0.5 (Note: Initial €500,000 plus received a reported €2.5 million in bonuses) | 2018 | (Republic of Ireland) Shamrock Rovers | (England) Manchester City | |
| 4 | Josh Honohan (IRL) | €0.5 (Note: Initial €500,000 plus agreed a reported potential €500,000 in bonuses) | 2025 | (Republic of Ireland) Shamrock Rovers | (England) Lincoln City | |
| 4 | Roy O'Donovan (IRL) | €0.5 | 2007 | (Republic of Ireland) Cork City | (England) Sunderland | |
| 7 | Naj Razi (IRL) | €0.45 | 2024 | (Republic of Ireland) Shamrock Rovers | (Italy) Como | |
| 8 | James McClean (IRL) | €0.42 (Note: Initial €420,000 plus received a reported €570,000 in bonuses) | 2011 | (Republic of Ireland) Derry City | (England) Sunderland | |
| 9 | Owen Elding (IRL) | €0.4 (Note: Initial €400,000 plus agreed a reported potential €600,000 in bonuses) | 2026 | (Republic of Ireland) Sligo Rovers | (Scotland) Hibernian | |
| 9 | James Abankwah (IRL) | €0.4 (Note: Initial €400,000 plus agreed a reported potential €600,000 in bonuses) | 2022 | (Republic of Ireland) St Patrick's Athletic | (Italy) Udinese | |
| 9 | Vinnie Leonard (IRL) | €0.4 (Note: Initial €400,000 plus agreed undisclosed potential bonuses) | 2026 | (Republic of Ireland) Dundalk | (England) Norwich City | |

== Awards ==
=== Trophy ===
The trophy

The current League of Ireland trophy was unveiled on 31 October 2007 by the FAI. It stands at 91 centimetres tall with a circumference of 83 centimetres. It is made from sterling silver. The design of the trophy consists of a silver football at the top, which is encompassed by the cup itself. Drogheda United were the first team to receive the newly created trophy on 2 November 2007. A replica trophy was commissioned towards the conclusion of the 2024 season as, with the champions not being decided until the final game, the FAI wished to ensure that there would be a trophy on-site and ready to present at both stadiums where each potential winner was playing – the Ryan McBride Brandywell Stadium and Tallaght Stadium.

=== Player and manager awards ===
In addition to the winner's trophy and the individual winner's medals awarded to players who win the title, the FAI also issue other awards throughout the season.

A man-of-the-match award is awarded to the player who has the greatest impact in an individual match. Monthly awards are also given for the Player of the Month and Goal of the Month. Awards are issued annually for Manager of the Year, Player of the Year and Goal of the Season. The Young Player of the Year award is given to the most outstanding U-21 player. Individual players are voted into the PFAI Team of the Year by their fellow professionals. The SWAI Personality of the Year is awarded by the Soccer Writers' Association of Ireland to the individual who is considered to have made the most positive impact on the domestic season. The Golden Boot award is given to the top goalscorer of every season.

== See also ==
- League of Ireland
- League of Ireland First Division
- League of Ireland Cup
- FAI Cup
- Football Association of Ireland
- Republic of Ireland football league system
- Football records and statistics in the Republic of Ireland
