= 1988–89 League of Ireland Premier Division =

League of Ireland Premier Division
- Season: 1988–89
- Teams: 12
- Champions: Derry City (1st title)
- Relegated: Cobh Ramblers; Waterford United
- European Cup: Derry City
- UEFA Cup: Dundalk F.C.
- UEFA Cup Winners' Cup: Cork City
- Top goalscorer: Billy Hamilton (Limerick City); 21 goals

The 1988–89 League of Ireland Premier Division was the fourth season of the League of Ireland Premier Division.

The Premier Division was made up of 12 teams.

== Overview ==
The Premier Division was contested by 12 teams and Derry City F.C. won the championship.

== Final Table ==
Pos	Team	Pld	W	D	L	GF	GA	GD	Pts	Qualification or relegation
1	Derry City (C)	33	24	5	4	70	21	+49	53	Qualification to 1989–90 European Cup
2	Dundalk	33	20	11	2	55	27	+28	51	Qualification to 1989–90 UEFA Cup
3	Limerick City	33	18	9	6	57	37	+20	45	
4	St Patrick's Athletic	33	16	11	6	40	19	+21	43	
5	Bohemians	33	12	6	15	41	43	−2	30	
6	Athlone Town	33	11	7	15	30	33	−3	29	
7	Shamrock Rovers	33	8	13	12	34	42	−8	29	
8	Cork City	33	8	10	15	29	36	−7	26	Qualification to 1989–90 European Cup Winners' Cup (Note: Cork City qualified for the 1989–90 European Cup Winners' Cup after reaching the 1988–89 FAI Cup final.)
9	Shelbourne	33	8	10	15	26	40	−14	26	
10	Galway United	33	8	9	16	34	56	−22	25	
11	Cobh Ramblers (R)	33	6	9	18	29	54	−25	21	Relegation to League of Ireland First Division
12	Waterford United (R)	33	6	6	21	21	58	−37	18	Relegation to League of Ireland First Division

Source: www.rsssf.com
(C) Champions; (R) Relegated

== Results ==
=== Matches 1–22 ===
Home \ Away	ATH	BOH	COB	COR	DER	DUN	GAL	LIM	SHM	SHE	StP	WAT
Athlone Town	—	0–2	0–0	1–0	1–0	1–2	0–0	0–0	3–1	0–1	1–1	0–1
Bohemians	0–1	—	2–0	3–0	0–2	1–1	1–1	4–2	2–2	1–0	1–3	3–0
Cobh Ramblers	0–0	0–2	—	0–1	2–5	1–0	0–0	0–1	1–1	2–2	1–2	4–0
Cork City	1–2	0–0	3–0	—	0–1	1–2	0–0	0–2	0–0	2–1	0–1	3–0
Derry City	3–0	3–0	5–0	4–2	—	1–1	5–1	1–1	1–1	2–3	1–0	2–0
Dundalk	0–0	1–1	3–1	2–0	1–1	—	5–2	2–0	2–1	2–2	2–1	3–0
Galway United	2–4	2–1	0–1	2–1	0–3	1–3	—	1–5	1–1	0–2	1–1	0–0
Limerick City	1–0	3–1	3–3	2–0	1–1	1–2	2–1	—	4–1	1–0	0–0	2–2
Shamrock Rovers	0–1	3–1	1–2	2–2	0–2	1–1	0–2	3–2	—	1–1	0–4	1–0
Shelbourne	1–0	0–2	3–2	0–1	0–5	0–0	2–0	2–3	0–0	—	0–0	1–0
St Patrick's Athletic	0–0	2–0	3–0	2–1	1–0	0–1	3–0	0–0	0–0	1–1	—	2–0
Waterford United	0–2	0–3	2–0	0–0	1–2	1–1	0–3	1–2	2–0	0–0	1–4	—

Legend: Blue = home team win; Yellow = draw; Red = away team win.

=== Matches 23–33 ===
Home \ Away	ATH	BOH	COB	COR	DER	DUN	GAL	LIM	SHM	SHE	StP	WAT
Athlone Town	—	4–1	—	—	0–1	1–2	—	0–3	—	—	0–1	1–2
Bohemians	—	—	—	1–1	1–2	0–1	—	—	—	1–0	0–1	4–0
Cobh Ramblers	2–1	0–2	—	—	—	—	1–2	1–2	1–1	—	—	—
Cork City	2–1	—	1–1	—	0–2	—	4–0	—	0–1	0–0	—	—
Derry City	—	—	2–0	—	—	2–0	2–1	—	0–1	—	1–0	2–0
Dundalk	—	—	3–1	1–0	—	—	1–1	—	2–1	1–0	—	—
Galway United	1–2	4–0	—	—	—	—	—	0–3	2–0	—	—	2–1
Limerick City	—	1–0	—	1–1	1–3	2–5	—	—	—	—	3–1	2–1
Shamrock Rovers	2–1	3–0	—	—	—	—	—	0–0	—	—	0–1	4–0
Shelbourne	0–2	—	0–2	—	1–3	—	1–0	0–1	1–1	—	—	—
St Patrick's Athletic	—	—	0–0	0–0	—	0–1	1–1	—	—	2–1	—	—
Waterford United	—	—	1–0	1–2	—	1–1	—	—	—	2–0	1–2	—

Legend: Blue = home team win; Yellow = draw; Red = away team win.

== See also ==
- 1988–89 League of Ireland First Division
