= 1989–90 League of Ireland First Division =

League of Ireland First Division
- Season: 1989–90
- Champions: Waterford United
- Promoted: Sligo Rovers
- European Cup Winners' Cup: Bray Wanderers
- Top goalscorer: John Ryan: 16 (Bray Wanderers)

The 1989–90 League of Ireland First Division season was the fifth season of the League of Ireland First Division.

== Overview ==
The First Division was contested by 10 teams and Waterford United F.C. won the division.

== Final table ==
Pos	Team	Pld	W	D	L	GF	GA	GD	Pts	Promotion or qualification
1	Waterford United F.C.	27	16	5	6	58	28	+30	37	Promoted to Premier Division
2	Sligo Rovers F.C.	27	13	11	3	30	12	+18	37	Promoted to Premier Division
3	Bray Wanderers A.F.C.	27	15	5	7	41	23	+18	35	Qualified for 1990–91 European Cup Winners' Cup (Note: Bray Wanderers A.F.C. qualified for the 1990–91 European Cup Winners' Cup after winning the 1989–90 FAI Cup final.)
4	Kilkenny City A.F.C.	27	14	7	6	40	24	+16	35	
5	Home Farm F.C.	27	12	5	10	27	16	+11	29	
6	Finn Harps F.C.	27	11	5	11	32	30	+2	27	
7	Cobh Ramblers F.C.	27	10	5	12	33	31	+2	25	
8	Longford Town F.C.	27	4	9	14	15	46	−31	17	
9	Newcastlewest F.C. (Note: Newcastlewest F.C. resigned from the League of Ireland at the end of the season.)	27	5	4	18	23	51	−28	14	
10	Monaghan United F.C.	27	5	4	18	23	61	−38	14	

== First Division play-off ==
After Waterford United and Sligo Rovers finished level on points, a play-off was held to decide the overall title winners.

=== 1st leg ===
Sligo Rovers	1–0	Waterford United

=== 2nd leg ===
Waterford United	2–0	Sligo Rovers

Waterford United won 2–1 on aggregate and were declared champions.

== See also ==
- 1989–90 League of Ireland Premier Division
