= 1991–92 League of Ireland First Division =

League of Ireland First Division
- Season: 1991–92
- Champions: Limerick City
- Promoted: Waterford United
- Top goalscorer: Con McLoughlin:12 (Finn Harps); Barry Ryan:12 (Limerick City)

The 1991–92 League of Ireland First Division season was the seventh season of the League of Ireland First Division, the second tier of the league system.

== Overview ==
The First Division was contested by 10 teams and Limerick City F.C. won the division. Limerick were managed by Sam Allardyce, who was player-manager for one season only, taking Limerick back to the Premier Division a year after they were relegated.

== Final table ==
| Pos | Team | Pld | W | D | L | GF | GA | GD | Pts | Promotion |
|---|---|---|---|---|---|---|---|---|---|---|
| 1 | Limerick City F.C. (Note: Limerick City F.C. changed their club name to Limerick F.C. for the 1992–93 season.) | 27 | 14 | 10 | 3 | 47 | 27 | +20 | 38 | Promoted to Premier Division |
| 2 | Waterford United F.C. | 27 | 11 | 11 | 5 | 39 | 25 | +14 | 33 | Promoted to Premier Division |
| 3 | Cobh Ramblers F.C. | 27 | 10 | 12 | 5 | 29 | 22 | +7 | 32 | |
| 4 | University College Dublin A.F.C. | 27 | 11 | 8 | 8 | 37 | 25 | +12 | 30 | |
| 5 | St James's Gate F.C. | 27 | 9 | 7 | 11 | 23 | 32 | −9 | 25 | |
| 6 | Finn Harps F.C. | 27 | 8 | 8 | 11 | 36 | 42 | −6 | 24 | |
| 7 | Monaghan United F.C. | 27 | 6 | 12 | 9 | 32 | 39 | −7 | 24 | |
| 8 | Kilkenny City A.F.C. | 27 | 7 | 8 | 12 | 35 | 44 | −9 | 22 | |
| 9 | Home Farm F.C. | 27 | 5 | 11 | 11 | 26 | 33 | −7 | 21 | |
| 10 | Longford Town F.C. | 27 | 7 | 7 | 13 | 26 | 41 | −15 | 21 | |

== See also ==
- 1991–92 League of Ireland Premier Division
