= 1991–92 League of Ireland Premier Division =

League of Ireland Premier Division
- Season: 1991–92
- Champions: Shelbourne F.C. (8th title)
- Relegated: Athlone Town; Galway United
- European Cup: Shelbourne F.C.
- UEFA Cup: Derry City
- UEFA Cup Winners' Cup: Bohemian F.C.
- Top goalscorer: John Caulfield: 16 (Cork City)

The 1991–92 League of Ireland Premier Division was the seventh season of the League of Ireland Premier Division. The Premier Division was made up of 12 teams.

== Overview ==
The Premier Division was contested by 12 teams and Shelbourne F.C. won the championship.

== Final Table ==
Pos	Team	Pld	W	D	L	GF	GA	GD	Pts	Qualification or relegation
1	Shelbourne (C)	33	21	7	5	57	29	+28	49	Qualification to Champions League preliminary round
2	Derry City	33	17	10	6	49	21	+28	44	Qualification to UEFA Cup first round
3	Cork City	33	16	11	6	47	30	+17	43	
4	Dundalk	33	14	12	7	44	31	+13	40	
5	Bohemians	33	14	9	10	45	34	+11	37	Qualification to Cup Winners' Cup first round (Note: Bohemians qualified for the 1991–92 European Cup Winners' Cup after winning the 1991–92 FAI Cup final.)
6	Shamrock Rovers	33	9	15	9	33	30	+3	33	
7	St Patrick's Athletic	33	9	11	13	38	46	−8	29	
8	Bray Wanderers	33	8	10	15	17	37	−20	26	
9	Sligo Rovers	33	7	11	15	33	42	−9	25	
10	Drogheda United (Note: Drogheda United were docked 1 point for a player registration irregularity.)	33	6	13	14	23	46	−23	24	
11	Athlone Town (R)	33	6	11	16	31	50	−19	23	Relegation to League of Ireland First Division
12	Galway United (R)	33	7	8	18	37	58	−21	22	Relegation to League of Ireland First Division

Source: www.rsssf.com
(C) Champions; (R) Relegated

== Results ==
=== Matches 1–22 ===
Home \ Away	ATH	BOH	BRW	COR	DER	DRO	DUN	GAL	SHM	SHE	SLI	StP
Athlone Town	—	0–0	0–0	0–0	0–1	1–1	1–2	2–1	2–2	0–2	0–0	2–3
Bohemians	2–0	—	2–0	2–1	0–1	2–0	1–2	2–1	1–1	0–0	1–1	2–1
Bray Wanderers	1–1	1–0	—	0–0	0–3	1–1	0–2	2–0	0–0	0–1	1–2	0–1
Cork City	1–1	1–1	2–0	—	0–0	0–0	4–0	2–0	0–0	2–2	1–0	3–1
Derry City	2–0	0–1	2–0	2–0	—	7–1	0–0	1–0	0–0	3–2	0–0	1–1
Drogheda United	2–1	0–3	0–1	1–3	0–2	—	2–2	0–0	0–0	0–3	1–1	0–0
Dundalk	4–1	0–1	4–0	3–0	1–1	1–1	—	2–1	0–0	0–2	1–0	1–0
Galway United	1–0	4–4	1–1	1–2	0–2	1–2	0–2	—	0–2	1–3	5–1	4–0
Shamrock Rovers	2–0	1–3	2–0	1–3	0–1	0–1	1–1	3–0	—	1–2	2–0	1–1
Shelbourne	2–0	1–2	3–0	3–3	1–0	1–0	1–1	1–1	0–1	—	1–0	1–0
Sligo Rovers	1–2	0–0	1–2	2–1	2–2	2–3	1–2	5–1	0–1	1–4	—	0–0
St Patrick's Athletic	1–1	3–2	2–1	2–4	0–1	3–1	1–0	1–1	1–1	1–1	1–1	—

Legend: Blue = home team win; Yellow = draw; Red = away team win.

=== Matches 23–33 ===
Home \ Away	ATH	BOH	BRW	COR	DER	DRO	DUN	GAL	SHM	SHE	SLI	StP
Athlone Town	—	—	—	3–2	—	—	2–1	0–1	—	1–2	1–1	—
Bohemians	1–0	—	—	—	1–2	1–1	2–3	—	0–0	—	—	—
Bray Wanderers	0–1	1–0	—	2–1	—	—	—	0–2	—	0–2	—	0–0
Cork City	—	1–0	—	—	—	0–0	—	2–1	1–0	—	—	2–1
Derry City	2–2	—	0–0	0–1	—	—	0–2	—	3–1	—	3–1	—
Drogheda United	1–2	—	0–1	—	1–0	—	—	1–0	0–0	—	0–3	—
Dundalk	—	—	0–0	1–1	—	0–0	—	—	—	1–3	0–1	—
Galway United	—	3–2	—	—	1–1	—	2–2	—	2–2	0–5	—	1–0
Shamrock Rovers	2–1	—	1–1	—	—	—	1–1	—	—	—	1–2	2–1
Shelbourne	—	2–1	—	0–1	0–5	2–1	—	—	2–1	—	0–0	—
Sligo Rovers	—	1–2	0–1	0–2	—	—	—	3–0	—	—	—	0–0
St Patrick's Athletic	6–3	1–3	—	—	2–1	2–1	0–2	—	—	1–2	—	—

Legend: Blue = home team win; Yellow = draw; Red = away team win.

== See also ==
- 1991–92 League of Ireland First Division
