= League of Ireland First Division =

Association football league in Ireland

- Founded: 1985
- Country: (Republic of Ireland) Ireland
- Number of clubs: 10
- Level on pyramid: 2
- Promotion to: League of Ireland Premier Division
- Relegation to: FAI National League (starting from 2027)
- Domestic cup: FAI Cup
- International cup: UEFA Europa League (via FAI Cup)
- Current champions: Cork City (4th title) (2026)
- Most championships: Drogheda United (5 titles)
- Website: SSEAirtricityLeague.ie
- Current: 2026 League of Ireland First Division

The League of Ireland First Division, also known as the SSE Airtricity League First Division for sponsorship reasons, is the second-highest division in both the League of Ireland and the Republic of Ireland football league system. The division was formed in 1985 as it replaced the League of Ireland B Division as the League of Ireland's second level division. Since 2003 the First Division has operated as a summer league. The division is contested by 10 clubs.

== History ==
=== Inaugural season ===
In 1985 five teams – Bray Wanderers, Cobh Ramblers, Derry City, EMFA and Newcastle United – were elected to join the League of Ireland. All five subsequently participated in the inaugural 1985–86 First Division season, along with Monaghan United from the League of Ireland B Division and four clubs – Drogheda United, Finn Harps, Longford Town and Sligo Rovers – who were relegated following the 1984–85 League of Ireland season. Bray Wanderers were the inaugural First Division champions.

=== Europe ===
As a second level division, clubs playing in the First Division cannot qualify directly for Europe. However First Division clubs have qualified for Europe after winning the FAI Cup. In 1989–90 Bray Wanderers qualified for the 1990–91 European Cup Winners' Cup after winning the 1989–90 FAI Cup final. As a result, they became the first First Division team to play in Europe. In 1993–94 Sligo Rovers qualified for the 1994–95 European Cup Winners' Cup after winning the 1993–94 FAI Cup final. Rovers were also the 1993–94 First Division champions and were promoted to the 1994–95 Premier Division. As a result, they were actually a Premier Division club when they played in Europe. Bray Wanderers qualified for the 1999–2000 UEFA Cup after winning the 1999 FAI Cup Final. However, after finishing eleventh in the 1998–99 Premier Division, they were relegated to 1999–2000 First Division and as a result they were playing in the First Division when they subsequently embarked on their European campaign.

In 2009 Sporting Fingal qualified for the 2010–11 UEFA Europa League after winning the 2009 FAI Cup Final. They were also promoted to the 2010 Premier Division after winning the promotion/relegation play-off. In 2015 UCD qualified for the 2015–16 UEFA Europa League via the UEFA Respect Fair Play ranking system. After the FAI finished third in the 2014–15 rankings, they nominated UCD for the extra European place.

=== Promotion and relegation ===
A promotion and relegation system has existed between the League of Ireland Premier Division and the First Division since 1985–86. In 1992–93 a promotion/relegation play-off was also introduced. Between 2008 and 2011, A Championship teams were also eligible for promotion to the First Division. During this time both Mervue United and Salthill Devon were both promoted to the First Division from the A Championship. There is no formal promotion and relegation relationship between the First Division and the three third level provincial leagues – the Leinster Senior League Senior Division, the Munster Senior League and the Ulster Senior League. However provincial level teams have been invited to join the division. In 1990–91 St James's Gate were invited to join and in 1996–97 they were replaced by St Francis. In 2015, Cabinteely became the most recent team to accept an invite. All three clubs were recruited from the Leinster Senior League. Treaty United from the Munster senior league joined the first division in 2021, replacing Shamrock Rovers second team. Newly established Kerry were awarded their license in November 2022, confirming their place for the 2023 season.

== 2026 clubs ==
Team	Location	Stadium	Capacity
Athlone Town	Athlone	Athlone Town Stadium	5,000
Bray Wanderers	Bray	Carlisle Grounds	4,000
Cobh Ramblers	Cobh	St. Colman's Park	3,000
Cork City	Cork	Turners Cross	7,485
Finn Harps	Ballybofey	Finn Park	6,000
Kerry	Tralee	Mounthawk Park	1,200
Longford Town	Longford	Bishopsgate	5,097
Treaty United	Limerick	Markets Field	5,000
UCD	Dublin	UCD Bowl	3,000
Wexford	Crossabeg	Ferrycarrig Park	2,500

== List of winners by season ==
Season	Champions	Runners-up	Third place
1985–86	Bray Wanderers	Sligo Rovers	Longford Town
1986–87	Derry City	Shelbourne	Drogheda United
1987–88	Athlone Town	Cobh Ramblers	Finn Harps
1988–89	Drogheda United	UCD	Bray Wanderers
1989–90	Waterford United	Sligo Rovers	Bray Wanderers
1990–91	Drogheda United (2)	Bray Wanderers	Cobh Ramblers
1991–92	Limerick City	Waterford United	Cobh Ramblers
1992–93	Galway United	Cobh Ramblers	Monaghan United
1993–94	Sligo Rovers	Athlone Town	Finn Harps
1994–95	UCD	Drogheda United	Finn Harps
1995–96	Bray Wanderers (2)	Finn Harps	Home Farm Everton
1996–97	Kilkenny City	Drogheda United	Waterford United
1997–98	Waterford United (2)	Bray Wanderers	Limerick
1998–99	Drogheda United (3)	Galway United	Cobh Ramblers
1999–2000	Bray Wanderers (3)	Longford Town	Kilkenny City
2000–01	Dundalk	Monaghan United	Athlone Town
2001–02	Drogheda United (4)	Finn Harps	Dublin City
2002–03	Waterford United (3)	Finn Harps	Galway United
2003	Dublin City	Bray Wanderers	Finn Harps
2004	Finn Harps	UCD	Bray Wanderers
2005	Sligo Rovers (2)	Dublin City	Cobh Ramblers
2006	Shamrock Rovers	Dundalk	Galway United
2007	Cobh Ramblers	Finn Harps	Dundalk
2008	Dundalk (2)	Shelbourne	Waterford United
2009	UCD (2)	Shelbourne	Sporting Fingal
2010	Derry City (2)	Waterford United	Monaghan United
2011	Cork City	Shelbourne	Monaghan United
2012	Limerick (2)	Waterford United	Longford Town
2013	Athlone Town (2)	Longford Town	Mervue United
2014	Longford Town	Shelbourne	Galway
2015	Wexford Youths	Finn Harps	UCD
2016	Limerick (3)	Drogheda United	UCD
2017	Waterford (4)	Cobh Ramblers	UCD
2018	UCD (3)	Finn Harps	Shelbourne
2019	Shelbourne	Drogheda United	Longford Town
2020	Drogheda United (5)	Bray Wanderers	UCD
2021	Shelbourne (2)	Galway United	UCD
2022	Cork City (2)	Waterford	Galway United
2023	Galway United (2)	Waterford	Cobh Ramblers
2024	Cork City (3)	UCD	Wexford
2025	Dundalk (3)	Cobh Ramblers	Bray Wanderers
2026	Cork City (4)	UCD	Bray Wanderers

== Attendance ==
Season	Total	Average	Highest	Ref.
2011	102,630	622	3,433	
2016	52,987	477	–	
2017	53,342	476	–	
2018	59,946	422	–	
2019	75,795	561	–	
2020	–	–	–	
2021	–	–	–	
2022	178,000	1,193	–	
2023	196,050	1,089	4,300	
2024	165,163	918	5,507	
2025	157,095	872	3,358	

Key
	Record high
	Record low
*	Affected by the COVID-19 pandemic

== List of winners by club ==
Club	Titles	Seasons
Drogheda United	5	1988–89, 1990–91, 1998–99, 2001–02, 2020
Cork City	4	2011, 2022, 2024, 2026
Waterford	4	1989–90, 1997–98, 2002–03, 2017
Dundalk	3	2000–01, 2008, 2025
UCD	3	1994–95, 2009, 2018
Limerick (D)	3	1991–92, 2012, 2016
Bray Wanderers	3	1985–86, 1995–96, 1999–00
Athlone Town	2	1987–88, 2013
Derry City	2	1986–87, 2010
Galway United	2	1992–93, 2023
Shelbourne	2	2019, 2021
Sligo Rovers	2	1993–94, 2005
Wexford Youths	1	2015
Longford Town	1	2014
Cobh Ramblers	1	2007
Shamrock Rovers	1	2006
Finn Harps	1	2004
Dublin City (D)	1	2003
Kilkenny City (D)	1	1996–97

(D): Club Dissolved

== Top scorers ==
Season	Player	Club	Goals
1985–86	(Republic of Ireland) Con McLoughlin	Finn Harps	11
1985–86	(Republic of Ireland) Harry McLoughlin	Sligo Rovers	11
1986–87	(Socialist Federal Republic of Yugoslavia) Aleksandar Krstić	Derry City	18
1987–88	(Republic of Ireland) Con McLoughlin	Finn Harps	19
1988–89	(Republic of Ireland) Pat O'Connor	Home Farm	14
1989–90	(Republic of Ireland) John Ryan	Bray Wanderers	16
1990–91	(Republic of Ireland) Jim Barr	Monaghan United	12
1990–91	(Republic of Ireland) Con McLoughlin	Finn Harps	12
1991–92	(Republic of Ireland) Con McLoughlin	Finn Harps	12
1991–92	(Republic of Ireland) Barry Ryan	Limerick City	12
1992–93	(Republic of Ireland) Mick Byrne	Monaghan United	15
1992–93	(Republic of Ireland) Richie Parsons	Longford Town	15
1993–94	(Republic of Ireland) Karl Gannon	Home Farm	16
1994–95	(Republic of Ireland) Michael O'Byrne	UCD	14
1994–95	(Republic of Ireland) Philip Power	Home Farm	14
1995–96	(Northern Ireland) Jonathan Speak	Finn Harps	17
1996–97	(Republic of Ireland) Richie Hale	Kilkenny City	13
1996–97	(Republic of Ireland) Tony Izzi	Cobh Ramblers	13
1997–98	(Republic of Ireland) Fergal Coleman	Galway United	13
1998–99	(Republic of Ireland) Tony Izzi	Cobh Ramblers	13
1999–00	(Republic of Ireland) Robbie Farrell	Home Farm Fingal	17
1999–00	(Republic of Ireland) Andrew Myler	Monaghan United	17
1999–00	(Republic of Ireland) Keith O'Connor	Longford Town	17
2000–01	(Republic of Ireland) Andrew Myler^{(Note 1)}	Athlone Town	29
2001–02	(Republic of Ireland) Kevin McHugh^{(Note 2)}	Finn Harps	27
2002–03	(Republic of Ireland) Willie Bruton	Cobh Ramblers	14
2002–03	(Republic of Ireland) Kevin McHugh	Finn Harps	14
2003	(Republic of Ireland) Alan Murphy	Galway United	21
2004	(Republic of Ireland) Kevin McHugh	Finn Harps	24
2005	(Republic of Ireland) Kieran O'Reilly	Cobh Ramblers	17
2006	(Republic of Ireland) Philip Hughes	Dundalk	21
2007	(Republic of Ireland) Conor Gethins	Finn Harps	15
2008	(Republic of Ireland) Robbie Doyle	Sporting Fingal	17
2009	(Republic of Ireland) Conan Byrne	Sporting Fingal	21
2010	(Republic of Ireland) Graham Cummins	Cork City	18
2010	(Republic of Ireland) Mark Farren	Derry City	18
2010	(Republic of Ireland) Willie John Kiely	Waterford United	18
2011	(Republic of Ireland) Graham Cummins	Cork City	24
2012	(Republic of Ireland) Sean Maguire	Waterford United	13
2012	(Republic of Ireland) Kevin McHugh	Finn Harps	13
2012	(Republic of Ireland) Daniel Furlong	Wexford Youths	13
2013	(Republic of Ireland) David O'Sullivan	Longford Town	21
2014	(Republic of Ireland) David O'Sullivan	Longford Town	21
2015	(Republic of Ireland) Daniel Furlong	Wexford Youths	30
2016	(Republic of Ireland) Gary O'Neill	UCD	13
2017	(Republic of Ireland) Georgie Kelly	UCD	17
2018	(Republic of Ireland) David O'Sullivan	Shelbourne	15
2019	(Republic of Ireland) Rob Manley	Cabinteely	17
2020	(Egypt) Yousef Mahdy	UCD	15
2021	(Republic of Ireland) Colm Whelan	UCD	19
2022	(Scotland) Phoenix Patterson	Waterford	17
2023	(Republic of Ireland) Ronan Coughlan	Waterford	33
2024	(Republic of Ireland) Dean Ebbe	Athlone Town	15
2025	(Republic of Ireland) Barry Coffey	Cobh Ramblers	26
2026	(Republic of Ireland) Sean Maguire	Cork City	19

Notes

- ^1 Including 2 goals in playoffs
- ^2 Including 3 goals in playoffs

== See also ==
- League of Ireland
- League of Ireland Premier Division
- Republic of Ireland football league system
- List of foreign League of Ireland players
