= 1989–90 League of Ireland Premier Division =

League of Ireland Premier Division
- Season: 1989–90
- Champions: St Patrick's Athletic (4th title)
- Relegated: Drogheda United; UCD
- European Cup: St Patrick's Athletic
- UEFA Cup: Derry City
- UEFA Cup Winners' Cup: Bray Wanderers (Note: Bray Wanderers A.F.C. who played in the First Division qualified for the 1990–91 European Cup Winners' Cup after winning the 1989–90 FAI Cup final.)
- Top goalscorer: Mark Ennis: 19 (St. Patrick's Athletic)

The 1989–90 League of Ireland Premier Division was the fifth season of the League of Ireland Premier Division. The Premier Division was made up of 12 teams.

== Overview ==
The Premier Division was contested by 12 teams and St Patrick's Athletic F.C. won the championship.

== Final Table ==
Pos	Team	Pld	W	D	L	GF	GA	GD	Pts	Qualification or relegation
1	St Patrick's Athletic (C)	33	22	8	3	51	22	+29	52	Qualification to 1990–91 European Cup
2	Derry City	33	20	9	4	72	18	+54	49	Qualification to 1990–91 UEFA Cup
3	Dundalk	33	17	8	8	50	26	+24	42	
4	Shamrock Rovers	33	16	8	9	45	37	+8	40	
5	Cork City	33	14	9	10	35	24	+11	37	
6	Bohemians	33	14	7	12	35	32	+3	35	
7	Shelbourne	33	10	13	10	39	39	0	33	
8	Galway United	33	10	9	14	39	61	−22	29	
9	Limerick City	33	7	8	18	28	50	−22	22	
10	Athlone Town	33	5	12	16	28	53	−25	22	
11	Drogheda United (R)	33	5	8	20	20	44	−24	18	Relegation to League of Ireland First Division
12	UCD (R)	33	6	5	22	25	61	−36	17	Relegation to League of Ireland First Division

Source: www.rsssf.com
(C) Champions; (R) Relegated

== Results ==
=== Matches 1–22 ===
Home \ Away	ATH	BOH	COR	DER	DRO	DUN	GAL	LIM	SHM	SHE	StP	UCD
Athlone Town	—	1–1	0–0	0–3	1–1	0–1	3–3	3–2	0–3	1–1	1–0	1–1
Bohemians	2–1	—	0–0	1–3	4–0	0–2	1–0	2–1	1–2	1–0	1–2	3–0
Cork City	2–0	0–2	—	0–0	1–1	0–1	0–0	2–1	1–1	0–1	0–3	2–0
Derry City	6–1	1–0	2–0	—	2–0	0–0	9–1	2–0	5–0	1–0	0–1	2–0
Drogheda United	0–0	0–1	0–1	2–0	—	0–1	0–2	1–0	2–1	1–1	0–1	1–0
Dundalk	2–0	1–1	1–2	0–2	1–0	—	3–0	4–0	1–0	4–3	2–1	5–0
Galway United	2–1	2–3	2–1	0–6	2–0	1–0	—	3–0	1–2	1–4	2–2	2–0
Limerick City	2–2	0–1	2–1	1–2	0–0	0–1	4–0	—	0–1	0–0	0–1	3–1
Shamrock Rovers	2–0	3–1	0–1	1–1	2–1	0–0	1–1	0–1	—	1–4	1–1	2–1
Shelbourne	1–1	0–0	0–1	0–0	2–0	0–0	1–0	2–0	1–3	—	1–1	1–1
St Patrick's Athletic	2–1	1–0	1–0	2–0	2–1	2–1	3–2	2–1	0–3	1–0	—	1–0
UCD	0–2	3–1	2–1	0–3	1–0	3–3	0–1	1–2	1–3	1–2	1–2	—

Legend: Blue = home team win; Yellow = draw; Red = away team win.

=== Matches 23–33 ===
Home \ Away	ATH	BOH	COR	DER	DRO	DUN	GAL	LIM	SHM	SHE	StP	UCD
Athlone Town	—	—	0–4	0–1	—	—	—	0–0	0–1	—	—	2–1
Bohemians	1–0	—	—	0–0	—	1–0	—	0–0	—	—	—	1–2
Cork City	—	1–0	—	2–0	2–0	—	—	—	—	4–0	0–1	—
Derry City	—	—	—	—	2–2	—	3–0	7–0	1–1	1–1	—	3–0
Drogheda United	0–1	1–2	—	—	—	—	—	—	1–0	2–2	0–2	—
Dundalk	3–2	—	0–0	1–3	3–1	—	—	0–1	1–2	—	—	—
Galway United	3–1	1–2	1–1	—	2–1	1–1	—	—	—	—	1–1	—
Limerick City	—	—	1–3	—	1–1	—	1–1	—	—	2–0	0–3	—
Shamrock Rovers	—	2–1	0–0	—	—	—	1–1	2–1	—	2–3	—	1–0
Shelbourne	1–1	0–2	—	—	—	0–4	4–0	—	—	—	0–3	—
St Patrick's Athletic	1–1	0–0	—	1–1	—	0–0	—	—	3–1	—	—	4–0
UCD	—	—	1–2	—	1–0	0–3	1–0	1–1	—	1–1	—	—

Legend: Blue = home team win; Yellow = draw; Red = away team win.

== See also ==
- 1989–90 League of Ireland First Division
