= Newcastle West Town F.C. =

Soccer club in County Limerick, Ireland

- Former Newcastle West Town F.C. logo
- Full name: Newcastle West Town Football Club
- Founded: 1948; 77 years ago (as Newcastle United); 2017; 8 years ago (as Newcastle West Town F.C.)
- Ground: Ballygowan Park Newcastle West
- Coordinates: 52.4527°N 9.0655°W
- League: Limerick Desmond League
- Website: ncwtownfc.ie
Home colours

Newcastle West Town F.C. is a youth association football club based in Newcastle West in the Republic of Ireland. It was formed in 2017 by the merger of Newcastle West A.F.C. (founded 1948 as a senior men's club) and Newcastle West Rovers F.C. (founded 1987). As of 2024, the club fields a team in the Premier Division of the Limerick Desmond League. The club plays its home games at Ballygowan Park.

== History ==
The club was founded in 1948 and was originally called Newcastle United. They were founding members of the Limerick Desmond League in 1955, and were its first champions. In 1985 they became one of the founding members of the League of Ireland First Division, finishing eighth in their first season in the league. The following season the club adopted the name Newcastle West A.F.C. (sometimes listed as Newcastlewest).

During their spell in the League of Ireland, the club twice reached the quarter-final of the FAI Cup, in 1988 and 1990. The first occasion was controversial; they faced Cobh Ramblers in the fifth round. The first match was drawn, and Newcastle West won the replay on their own ground 4–2 after extra time. According to the Irish Times' correspondent, "the style they put on in this nail biting thriller that produced four stunning goals in extra time made one wonder just why such a fine football side was having its troubles at league level." However, Cobh's protest, on the grounds that their former player Billy Daly had signed for Newcastle West too late to be eligible to play in the match, was upheld by the Football Association of Ireland (FAI) and Cobh were awarded the tie. In response, Newcastle West decided to pull out of the League with immediate effect. After urgent meetings involving all parties, a compromise was reached which saw Newcastle West remain in the league and the cup game replayed again. This time Newcastle West beat Cobh 1–0, with Daly scoring the winning goal, but lost to Longford Town in the quarter-final and missed out on a potentially lucrative semi-final meeting with Derry City. In the 1989–90 season, they produced "a shock victory" away to Sligo Rovers in a match where "high-flying tackles and off-the-ball confrontations marred the day", before losing at home in the quarter-final to intermediate club St Francis, who had already knocked out two other League of Ireland clubs in their first FAI Cup campaign.

After finishing ninth in the 1989–90 League of Ireland First Division, the club resigned from the league in order to make improvements to their Demesne ground, and were replaced in the league by St James's Gate. They had continued to run a team in the Limerick Desmond League and promptly won that league's top tier for four consecutive seasons between 1989–90 and 1992–93. The top tier was renamed from Division One to the Premier Division the following season but it wasn't until 2001–02 that Newcastle West captured their next league title. The club went on to secure three more titles that decade, winning the league in 2005–06, 2007–08 and 2008–09. A further title was won in 2012–13.

In 2017, Newcastle West A.F.C. amalgamated with Newcastle West Rovers. The combined clubs compete under the new name of Newcastle West Town.

== Managers ==
- (Republic of Ireland) Noel O'Mahony

== Honours ==
- Limerick Desmond League
  - Premier Division champions 2001–02
  - Division One champions 1955–56, 1989–90, 1990–91, 1991–92, 1992–93, 2001–02, 2005–06, 2007–08, 2008–09 2012–13
  - Desmond Cup winners 1993–94, 1999–2000, 2000–01, 2003–04, 2004–05, 2005–06, 2007–08
  - Premier Division Cup winners 1998–99, 1999–2000, 2005–06, 2006–07
  - Division One Cup winners 1991–92
