= Trevor Molloy =

Irish footballer (born 1977)

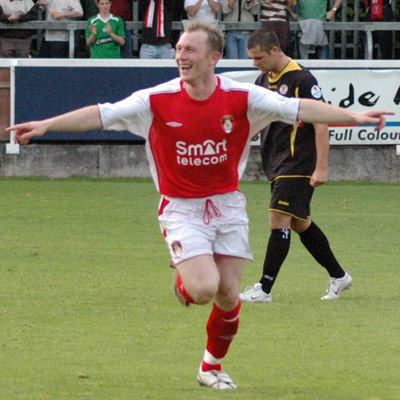
- Trevor Molloy after scoring for Pats v Sligo in 2006

Personal information
- Full name: Trevor Molloy
- Date of birth: 14 April 1977 (age 49)
- Place of birth: Dublin, Ireland
- Position: Forward

Youth career
- 19xx–1996: Stella Maris

Senior career*
Years	Team	Apps	(Gls)
1996	Shamrock Rovers	4	(0)
1996–1997	Athlone Town	18	(12)
1997–2000	St Patrick's Athletic	93	(32)
2000–2002	Bohemians	58	(17)
2002	Carlisle United	7	(1)
2002–2003	Shelbourne	2	(1)
2003–2006	Shamrock Rovers	106	(23)
2006	St Patrick's Athletic	27	(6)
2006–2007	Motherwell	6	(0)
2007–2011	Glenavon	115	(31)

International career
1997–1999	Republic of Ireland U21	3	(0)
- * Club domestic league appearances and goals

Trevor Molloy (born 14 April 1977 in Dublin) is an Irish former professional footballer. He played in the League of Ireland for Shamrock Rovers (2 seasons), Athlone Town, St Patrick's Athletic (2 seasons), Bohemians and Shelbourne. He also played for English Football League side Carlisle United, Scottish Premiership side Motherwell and for Glenavon in the NIFL Premiership. He is the father of Aaron Molloy, who is also a professional footballer.

== Career ==
Molloy started his league career with Shamrock Rovers at 18 making his League of Ireland debut at St Mel's Park on 7 January 1996 but after only a handful of appearances he moved to First Division club Athlone Town in 1996. He immediately hit his stride and ended up the division's second top scorer in 1996–97 season earning him a move to St Patrick's Athletic and a shock call up by Brian Kerr to the Republic of Ireland national football team for the 1997 FIFA World Youth Championships. Molloy played every game and was Ireland's joint top scorer (2) as they reached the semi-final stage only to lose to eventual winners Argentina. Ireland won bronze medals after beating Ghana in the 3rd/4th place play-off game.

At St. Pats he linked up with Ireland teammates Colin Hawkins and Thomas Morgan, who had been added to the nucleus of the squad that had won the 1995–96 League of Ireland Premier Division, and a lot was expected of the obviously talented squad. All three players made an immediate impact with Molloy enjoying a terrific partnership with Ian Gilzean as St. Pats won the league with a dramatic last day win in Kilkenny while arch-rivals Shelbourne lost to Dundalk. During this season Molloy won the first of his Under 21 caps. In 1998–99 Molloy finished as the League of Ireland Premier Division top scorer as St. Pats raced to another league title.

After a disappointing 1999–2000 season, Molloy was transferred to Bohemians for a St. Pats record of IR£40,000. Molloy repaid that fee instantly by scoring the winner as Bohemians knocked out Aberdeen in the UEFA Cup. However he then got sent off against FC Kaiserslautern in the next round. He would go on to play a vital role as Bohs won the League and FAI Cup double under manager Roddy Collins. The following year was not as successful for Bohs but they did reach the FAI Cup final only to lose to Dundalk.

In July 2002, Molloy was again signed by Roddy Collins, this time for Carlisle United of the English Third Division. After only a handful of appearances yielding a solitary goal against Lincoln City (a game in which he also got sent off), Molloy returned to Ireland to play for Shelbourne FC (and become one of a select few players to have played for Dublin football's 'Big 4'. Although Shelbourne finished 2nd in the league that season, it was not a successful season for Molloy and he moved on again, this time to his first club, Shamrock Rovers in October 2002.

A self-confessed Shamrock Rovers fan with a Rovers crest tattooed on his arm (now removed), commentators saw this as a dream move for Molloy. However he joined a club that had been struggling both on and off the field, as they fought to find a permanent home for themselves. For three years Molloy performed admirably (he was top club goalscorer in 2003 and the Player of the Year in 2004) and his dynamic displays saw him become a hero for the Rovers fans who had a love/hate relationship with him for years. His best efforts, though, were not enough to stop Rovers being relegated to the First Division as they lost a two legged play-off to Dublin City FC. In total he made 4 appearances in the 2003 UEFA Intertoto Cup for the Hoops.

With Rovers relegation came financial restraints and Molloy was permitted a move away from Rovers. In January 2006, he re-signed for St. Patrick's Athletic and immediately set about scoring goals, winning April's League of Ireland Goal of the Month.

Molloy scored in the 2006 FAI Cup final.

In January 2007 he joined Motherwell for an undisclosed fee. He left Motherwell by mutual consent in October 2007, having been informed he did not feature in the future plans of manager Mark McGhee.

Molloy signed for Glenavon in December 2007. and was released by the club in June 2011 having not been offered a new contract.

== Honours ==
- League of Ireland Premier Division: 3
  - St Patrick's Athletic 1997–98, 1998–99
  - Bohemians F.C. 2000–01
- FAI Cup:
  - Bohemians F.C. 2001
- FAI Super Cup:
  - St Patrick's Athletic 1999
- Leinster Senior Cup:
  - St Patrick's Athletic 1999/2000
- SRFC Player of the Year:
  - Shamrock Rovers – 2004

Republic of Ireland

- FIFA World Youth Championship Third Place: 1997
