= 1995–96 League of Ireland First Division =

League of Ireland First Division
- Season: 1995–96
- Champions: Bray Wanderers
- Promoted: Finn Harps; Home Farm Everton
- Top goalscorer: Jonathan Speak: 17 (Finn Harps)

The 1995–96 League of Ireland First Division season was the 11th season of the League of Ireland First Division.

== Overview ==
The First Division was contested by 10 teams and Bray Wanderers won the division.

== Final table ==
Pos	Team	Pld	W	D	L	GF	GA	GD	Pts	Promotion
1	Bray Wanderers A.F.C.	27	16	7	4	53	21	+32	55	Promoted to Premier Division
2	Finn Harps F.C.	27	14	7	6	50	25	+25	49	Promoted to Premier Division
3	Home Farm Everton F.C.	27	14	4	9	43	34	+9	46	Promoted to Premier Division after play-off
4	Cobh Ramblers F.C.	27	10	13	4	30	15	+15	43	
5	St James's Gate F.C.	27	9	11	7	35	30	+5	38	
6	Limerick F.C.	27	10	6	11	36	34	+2	36	
7	Kilkenny City A.F.C.	27	9	8	10	33	38	−5	35	
8	Waterford United F.C.	27	9	7	11	37	40	−3	34	
9	Longford Town F.C.	27	5	6	16	26	46	−20	21	
10	Monaghan United F.C.	27	2	5	20	10	70	−60	11	

== Promotion/relegation play-off ==
Third placed Home Farm Everton played off against Athlone Town who finished in tenth place in the 1995–96 League of Ireland Premier Division. The winner would compete in the 1996–97 League of Ireland Premier Division.

=== 1st leg ===
Home Farm Everton	2–0	Athlone Town

=== 2nd leg ===
Athlone Town	2–0	Home Farm Everton

Home Farm Everton won 4–3 on penalties and were promoted to the Premier Division

== See also ==
- 1995–96 League of Ireland Premier Division
