= 1995–96 League of Ireland Premier Division =

League of Ireland Premier Division
- Season: 1995–96
- Champions: St Patrick's Athletic (5th title)
- Relegated: Athlone Town; Drogheda United; Galway United
- UEFA Cup: St Patrick's Athletic; Bohemians
- UEFA Cup Winners' Cup: Shelbourne
- UEFA Intertoto Cup: Sligo Rovers
- Top goalscorer: Stephen Geoghegan: 19 (Shelbourne)

The 1995–96 League of Ireland Premier Division was the 11th season of the League of Ireland Premier Division. The division was made up of 12 teams. St Patrick's Athletic F.C. won the title.

== Regular season ==
This season saw each team playing three rounds of games, playing every other team three times, totalling 33 games.

=== Final table ===
Pos	Team	Pld	W	D	L	GF	GA	GD	Pts	Qualification or relegation
1	St Patrick's Athletic (C)	33	19	10	4	53	34	+19	67	Qualification to UEFA Cup preliminary round
2	Bohemians	33	18	8	7	60	29	+31	62	Qualification to UEFA Cup preliminary round
3	Sligo Rovers	33	16	7	10	45	38	+7	55	Qualification to Intertoto Cup group stage
4	Shelbourne	33	15	9	9	45	33	+12	54	Qualification to Cup Winners' Cup qualifying round (Note: Shelbourne qualified for the Cup Winners' Cup qualifying round after winning the 1995–96 FAI Cup final.)
5	Shamrock Rovers	33	14	8	11	32	32	0	50	
6	Derry City	33	11	13	9	50	38	+12	46	
7	Dundalk	33	11	9	13	38	39	−1	42	
8	UCD	33	12	6	15	38	40	−2	42	
9	Cork City (Note: Cork City F.C. were docked 3 points for fielding an ineligible player. The club went into liquidation in January 1996 but were saved from extinction after moving from Bishopstown Stadium to Turners Cross.)	33	12	8	13	37	41	−4	41	
10	Athlone Town (R)	33	8	7	18	38	59	−21	31	Qualification to Relegation play-off
11	Drogheda United (R)	33	7	9	17	39	51	−12	30	Relegation to League of Ireland First Division
12	Galway United (R)	33	5	6	22	26	67	−41	21	Relegation to League of Ireland First Division

Source: www.rsssf.com
(C) Champions; (R) Relegated

=== Results ===
==== Matches 1–22 ====
Home \ Away	ATH	BOH	COR	DER	DRO	DUN	GAL	SHM	SHE	SLI	StP	UCD
Athlone Town	—	2–5	2–4	1–1	0–2	0–0	0–2	2–0	1–2	1–2	0–1	1–0
Bohemians	3–1	—	1–1	1–0	6–0	3–2	3–0	1–1	1–0	2–0	0–1	0–0
Cork City	2–0	1–0	—	0–1	1–2	0–2	1–1	2–0	1–1	2–1	1–0	2–1
Derry City	5–3	1–1	2–0	—	1–0	1–1	2–0	1–1	1–2	1–2	5–1	3–1
Drogheda United	0–1	2–5	2–2	2–2	—	3–2	3–0	1–2	1–1	0–0	1–3	0–1
Dundalk	2–1	1–2	0–0	2–1	2–2	—	2–0	1–0	1–1	0–1	3–2	2–0
Galway United	2–2	1–5	3–1	1–1	0–3	0–1	—	1–1	1–1	2–3	0–1	1–1
Shamrock Rovers	1–1	1–0	1–1	2–0	1–1	1–0	2–1	—	0–1	0–2	0–1	0–2
Shelbourne	1–0	1–0	1–1	1–2	0–0	3–1	2–0	3–0	—	1–0	1–1	1–1
Sligo Rovers	4–2	0–0	3–1	1–1	1–0	3–3	3–2	0–1	0–0	—	0–0	2–0
St Patrick's Athletic	3–2	3–3	2–1	3–3	1–0	2–1	1–2	1–0	2–1	1–0	—	2–1
UCD	3–0	3–1	0–1	2–0	0–0	1–2	2–0	0–1	0–3	2–1	0–2	—

Legend: Blue = home team win; Yellow = draw; Red = away team win.

==== Matches 23–33 ====
Home \ Away	ATH	BOH	COR	DER	DRO	DUN	GAL	SHM	SHE	SLI	StP	UCD
Athlone Town	—	0–3	—	—	—	0–0	1–0	—	4–3	—	2–2	—
Bohemians	—	—	1–0	1–1	—	—	—	1–0	—	1–2	0–0	3–1
Cork City	0–2	—	—	—	2–1	—	3–0	—	2–1	—	0–0	—
Derry City	1–1	—	2–1	—	1–1	0–1	—	—	—	4–0	—	1–1
Drogheda United	0–1	0–1	—	—	—	2–1	6–1	—	1–3	0–1	—	—
Dundalk	—	2–4	0–1	—	—	—	—	0–0	—	0–1	1–2	—
Galway United	—	0–2	—	0–3	—	2–1	—	0–2	1–3	—	—	0–2
Shamrock Rovers	2–1	—	2–0	2–1	1–0	—	—	—	—	—	—	2–0
Shelbourne	—	1–0	—	1–0	—	0–1	—	1–2	—	2–1	—	—
Sligo Rovers	2–1	—	4–1	—	—	—	0–2	3–1	—	—	1–1	—
St Patrick's Athletic	—	—	—	1–1	3–2	—	3–0	2–2	3–0	—	—	2–0
UCD	1–2	—	2–1	—	4–1	0–0	—	—	3–2	3–1	—	—

Legend: Blue = home team win; Yellow = draw; Red = away team win.

== Promotion/relegation play-off ==
Athlone Town who finished in tenth place played off against Home Farm Everton, the third placed team from the 1995–96 League of Ireland First Division.

=== 1st leg ===
Home Farm Everton	2–0	Athlone Town

=== 2nd leg ===
Athlone Town	2–0	Home Farm Everton

Home Farm Everton won 4–3 on penalties and were promoted to the Premier Division.

== See also ==
- 1995–96 League of Ireland First Division
