= 1998–99 League of Ireland First Division =

League of Ireland First Division
- Season: 1998–99
- Champions: Drogheda United
- Promoted: Galway United
- Top goalscorer: Tony Izzi: 13 (Cobh Ramblers)

The 1998–99 League of Ireland First Division season was the 14th season of the League of Ireland First Division.

== Overview ==
The First Division was contested by 10 teams and Drogheda United F.C. won the division.

== Final table ==
Pos	Team	Pld	W	D	L	GF	GA	GD	Pts	Promotion or qualification
1	Drogheda United F.C.	36	17	13	6	57	32	+25	64	Promoted to Premier Division
2	Galway United F.C.	36	16	16	4	53	34	+19	64	Promoted to Premier Division
3	Cobh Ramblers F.C.	36	17	7	12	55	43	+12	58	Lost promotion/relegation play-off
4	Longford Town F.C.	36	15	9	12	41	33	+8	54	
5	Kilkenny City A.F.C.	36	14	11	11	49	46	+3	53	
6	Limerick F.C.	36	13	13	10	39	35	+4	52	
7	Monaghan United F.C.	36	10	14	12	44	44	0	44	
8	Athlone Town A.F.C.	36	10	10	16	45	61	−16	40	
9	Home Farm Everton F.C. (Note: In 1999 when their sponsorship deal with Everton F.C. ended, Home Farm effectively split into two separate clubs. The amateur and youth sections became Home Farm F.C. and they eventually re–joined the Leinster Senior League. Meanwhile a new professional team, Home Farm Fingal F.C. continued to play in the League of Ireland First Division, starting in the 1999–2000 season. They later became Dublin City.)	36	11	5	20	42	54	−12	38	
10	St Francis F.C.	36	2	12	22	25	68	−43	18	

== Promotion/relegation play-off ==
Third placed Cobh Ramblers F.C. played off against Bohemians who finished in tenth place in the 1998–99 League of Ireland Premier Division. The winner would compete in the 1999–2000 League of Ireland Premier Division.

=== 1st leg ===
5 May 1999	Cobh Ramblers	0–5	Bohemians

=== 2nd leg ===
8 May 1999	Bohemians	2–0	Cobh Ramblers

Bohemians won 7–0 on aggregate and retained their place in the Premier Division.

== See also ==
- 1998–99 League of Ireland Premier Division
