= 2017 Dundalk F.C. season =

Dundalk
2017 season
- Manager: Stephen Kenny
- Premier Division: 2nd
- FAI Cup: Runners-up
- League Cup: Winners
- President's Cup: Runners-up
- Leinster Senior Cup: Runners-up
- Champions League: 2Q
- Top goalscorer: League: David McMillan (16); All: David McMillan (18)
- Highest home attendance: 4,746 (vs. Shamrock Rovers, 24 February 2017)
Home colours	Away colours

Dundalk entered the 2017 season as the reigning League Champions from 2016, having won the title for the third year in a row, and having come off a successful Europa League run that saw them become the first Irish club to both win points and win a match in the group stage of European competition. 2017 was Stephen Kenny's fifth season at the club as manager. It was Dundalk's ninth consecutive season in the top tier of Irish football, their 82nd in all, and their 91st in the League of Ireland.

== Season summary ==
The new season's curtain raiser - the President's Cup - was played on 17 February in Turners Cross between Dundalk and Cork City - the winners of the FAI Cup the previous year. Cork City won on a scoreline of 3-0. The 33 round League programme commenced on 24 February 2017, and was completed on 27 October 2017. Dundalk relinquished their title to Cork City, finishing as runners-up. They subsequently lost the 2017 FAI Cup Final to Cork City in a penalty shoot-out after the match finished 1-1. However, Kenny's side did pick up the club's sixth League Cup, with a 3-0 victory over Shamrock Rovers in the final. They were also runner-up in the Leinster Senior Cup, losing 4-2 to Shelbourne in the final.

In Europe they were knocked out at the first hurdle, losing to Rosenborg after extra-time in the Champions League second qualifying round. This was a disappointment after the club's exploits in 2016, even with the financial and organisational disparity between the sides.

=== First-Team Squad (2017) ===
Squad No.	Name	Date of Birth	Position	Debut season	League appearances	Goals
1	(Republic of Ireland) Gary Rogers	25 September 1981	GK	2015	29	0
2	(Republic of Ireland) Seán Gannon	11 July 1991	DF	2014	25	2
3	(Republic of Ireland) Brian Gartland	4 November 1986	DF	2013	26	3
4	(Republic of Ireland) Paddy Barrett	22 July 1993	DF	2015	15	0
5	(Republic of Ireland) Chris Shields	27 December 1990	MF	2012	26	0
6	(Republic of Ireland) Stephen O'Donnell	15 January 1986	MF	2013	20	1
7	(Northern Ireland) Michael Duffy	28 July 1994	MF	2017	32	8
8	(Republic of Ireland) John Mountney	22 February 1993	MF	2012	16	1
9	(Republic of Ireland) David McMillan	14 December 1988	FW	2015	30	16
10	(Republic of Ireland) Jamie McGrath	30 September 1996	MF	2017	28	6
11	(Republic of Ireland) Patrick McEleney	26 September 1992	MF	2016	26	10
12	(Republic of Ireland) Shane Grimes	9 March 1987	DF	2005	5	0
14	(Republic of Ireland) Dane Massey	17 April 1988	DF	2013	26	2
15	(Republic of Ireland) Seán Hoare	15 March 1994	DF	2017	17	0
16	(Republic of Ireland) Ciarán Kilduff (Note: Transferred to Jacksonville Armada in July.)	29 September 1988	FW	2015	20	6
16	(Republic of Ireland) Dylan Connolly (Note: Signed from Bray Wanderers in July and took the departed Kilduff's squad number.)	2 May 1995	MF	2017	9	1
18	(Republic of Ireland) Robbie Benson	7 May 1992	MF	2016	27	9
19	(Denmark) Niclas Vemmelund	2 October 1992	DF	2017	24	4
21	(Republic of Ireland) Conor Clifford	1 October 1991	MF	2017	15	0
22	(Romania) Gabriel Sava	15 September 1986	GK	2014	4	0
24	(Republic of Ireland) Stephen Kinsella	22 August 1998	MF	2017	9	1
26	(Northern Ireland) Thomas Stewart	12 November 1986	FW	2017	23	2

== Competitions ==
=== President's Cup ===
17 February 2017	Cork City	3 - 0	Dundalk	Turners Cross
19:45	Maguire 15'; O'Connor 68'; Sheppard 90+5'	Report		Attendance: 3,140; Referee: Anthony Buttimer

=== Premier Division ===
Pos	Team	Pld	W	D	L	GF	GA	GD	Pts	Qualification or relegation
1	Cork City (C)	33	24	4	5	67	23	+44	76	Qualification for Champions League first qualifying round
2	Dundalk	33	22	3	8	72	24	+48	69	Qualification for Europa League first qualifying round
3	Shamrock Rovers	33	17	3	13	49	41	+8	54	Qualification for Europa League first qualifying round
4	Derry City	33	14	9	10	49	40	+9	51	Qualification for Europa League first qualifying round
5	Bohemians	33	14	5	14	36	40	−4	47	

Source: SSE Airtricity League, Soccerway
Rules for classification: 1) Points; 2) Goal difference; 3) Goals scored.
(C) Champions

=== FAI Cup ===
First round

13 August 2017	Dundalk	4–0	Derry City	Dundalk
	Mountney 1', 81'; McMillan 51' (pen.); Duffy 90'			Stadium: Oriel Park

Second round

26 August 2017	Crumlin United	1–3	Dundalk
		Report

Quarter Final

8 September 2017	Dundalk	4–0	Drogheda United
		Report

Semi-final

1 October 2017	Dundalk	1–1	Shamrock Rovers
16:45		Report

Replay

10 October 2017	Shamrock Rovers	2–4 (a.e.t.)	Dundalk
		Report

Final

5 November 2017	Dundalk	1–1 (a.e.t.) (3–5 p)	Cork City	Aviva Stadium

=== League Cup ===
Second round

17 April 2017	Dundalk	1-1 (a.e.t.) (6–5 p)	UCD	Oriel Park
17:00	Conor Clifford 76'		Gary O'Neil 22'

Quarter Final

1 May 2017	Dundalk	3-0	Waterford	Oriel Park
17:00	Ciarán Kilduff 57'; Thomas Stewart 72'; Conor Clifford 79'

Semi-final

7 August 2017	Galway United	0-3	Dundalk	Eamonn Deacy Park
		Report	McGrath 11'; Benson 56'; Kevin Devaney (o.g.) 78'	Attendance: 1,017; Referee: Ray Matthews

Final

16 September 2017	Shamrock Rovers	0–3	Dundalk	Tallaght Stadium
15:00	Bolger (yellow card) 48' (yellow-red card) 65'	Report	McMillan 5'; McEleney 81'; Stewart 90+3'	Attendance: 4,102; Referee: Derek Tomney

=== Leinster Senior Cup ===
Fourth round

9 February 2017	St Patrick's CYFC	2–4	Dundalk	Dublin
19:45 GMT	David Cassidy 64'; Dean Gannon 81'	Report	Carlton Ubaezuonu 37'; Ciarán Kilduff 59'; Ciarán Kilduff 70'; Patrick McEleney 90'	Stadium: Irishtown Stadium; Attendance: 100 (est.)

Quarter Final

15 May 2017	Dundalk	6–0	Thomastown United	Dundalk
19:45 GMT	Ciarán Kilduff 11'; Shane Grimes 21'; Ciarán Kilduff 23'; Thomas Stewart 30'; Ciarán Kilduff 66'; Ciarán Kilduff 90'	Report		Stadium: Oriel Park

Semi-final

19 September 2017	UCD	1–1 (a.e.t.) (5–6 p)	Dundalk	Dublin
19:45 GMT	Gary O'Neill 42'	Report	Conor Clifford 84'	Stadium: UCD Bowl; Attendance: 200 (est.)

Final

4 October 2017	Dundalk	2–4 (a.e.t.)	Shelbourne	Dundalk
19:45 GMT	Conor Clifford 42'; Jake O'Connor 89'	Report	Dale Rooney 55'; Adam Evans; 81'; Adam Evans 95'; James English 105'	Stadium: Oriel Park; Attendance: 1000 (est.); Referee: Paul Mc Laughlin

=== Europe ===
==== Champions League ====
Second qualifying round

12 July 2017
20:45
(19:45 UTC+1)

Dundalk (Republic of Ireland)	1–1	(Norway) Rosenborg
McMillan 18'	Report	Reginiussen 44'

Oriel Park, Dundalk
Attendance: 3,100
Referee: Radu Petrescu (Romania)
19 July 2017
19:15
(19:15 UTC+2)

Rosenborg (Norway)	2–1 (a.e.t.)	(Republic of Ireland) Dundalk
De Lanlay 43'; Vilhjálmsson 98'	Report	Gartland 12'

Lerkendal Stadion, Trondheim
Attendance: 14,817
Referee: Aliyar Aghayev (Azerbaijan)

Rosenborg won 3–2 on aggregate.

== Awards ==
=== Player of the Month ===
Month	Player	References
June	(Republic of Ireland) Patrick McEleney	
