= Stephen Kenny (football manager) =

Irish football manager (born 1971)

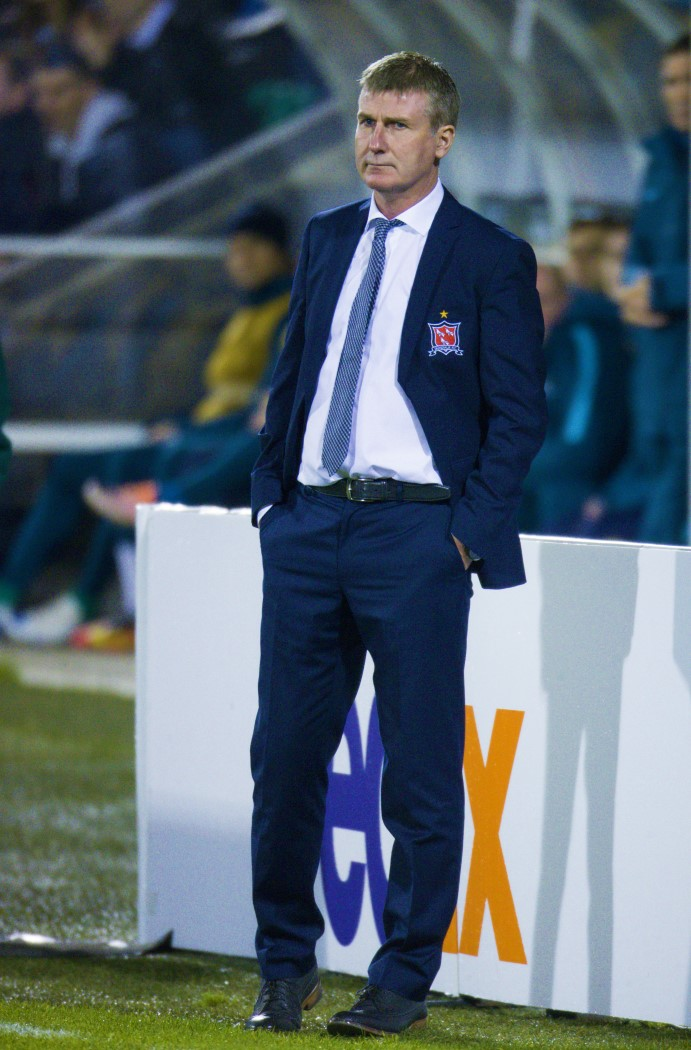
- Kenny managing in the UEFA Europa League in 2016

Personal information
- Full name: Stephen Kenny
- Date of birth: 30 October 1971 (age 55)
- Place of birth: Dublin, Ireland

Team information
- Current team: St Patrick's Athletic (manager)

Youth career
- Tallaght United
- Belvedere
- St Patrick's Athletic

Senior career*
Years	Team	Apps	(Gls)
1994	Home Farm	4	(0)
1994–1997	Tallaght Town		

Managerial career
- 1994–1997: Tallaght Town (player-manager)
- 1997–1998: St Patrick's Athletic U21
- 1998–2001: Longford Town
- 2001–2004: Bohemians
- 2004–2006: Derry City
- 2006–2007: Dunfermline Athletic
- 2007–2011: Derry City
- 2011–2012: Shamrock Rovers
- 2012–2018: Dundalk
- 2018–2020: Republic of Ireland U21
- 2020–2023: Republic of Ireland
- 2024–: St Patrick's Athletic
- * Club domestic league appearances and goals

Stephen Kenny (born 30 October 1971) is an Irish football manager and former player who is the manager of League of Ireland Premier Division side St Patrick's Athletic. He has formerly managed Longford Town, Bohemians, Derry City, Dunfermline Athletic, Shamrock Rovers, Dundalk, the Republic of Ireland U21 side and the senior Republic of Ireland national team. He is one of Republic of Ireland's most successful domestic league managers, having won eight trophies with Dundalk.

== Early life ==
Kenny grew up in Tallaght and lived there for the first 18 years of his life. He attended Our Lady of Loreto Boys National School and Old Bawn Community School. Kenny ran a successful meat-production business in the late 1990s before moving into football management full-time.

== Playing career ==
During his playing career, Kenny spent two years at Belvedere as a schoolboy before signing for St Patrick's Athletic. Without making an appearance he then transferred to Home Farm, playing just four games in the League of Ireland First Division, making his League of Ireland debut on 13 March 1994. Following time at Home Farm, Kenny had an offer to sign for Kilkenny City, before choosing to sign for hometown club Tallaght Town as player-manager. Starting in Senior 1B of the Leinster Senior League, Kenny guided the club to three successive promotions, before Shamrock Rovers merged with Tallaght Town.

== Coaching career ==
=== Early career ===
Following his time at Tallaght Town, Kenny moved to St Patrick's Athletic when he took charge of the Dublin side's under-21 squad in the Athletic Union League, guiding the team to a league win.

=== Longford Town ===
In the summer of 1998, Kenny became the youngest manager in National League history when he took over Longford Town at the age of 26. He led Longford to huge success during his three-year tenure as they won promotion to the League of Ireland Premier Division for the first time and subsequently reached the 2001 FAI Cup Final, qualifying for the 2001–02 UEFA Cup. During his time at Longford, his budget for the entire squad was £1,000 and he spent money out of his own pocket on transfer fees for Richie Parsons and Robbie Coyle with money that was supposed to be for wooden floors in the new house he and his wife had bought. He also organised a family holiday to Dungarvan, County Waterford, so he could speak face to face with Waterford natives Alan Kirby and Alan Reynolds, both of whom he convinced to sign for the club.

=== Bohemians ===
In December 2001, Kenny left the midlands club and became manager of Bohemians, taking over at Dalymount Park. Bohemians were then the champions of the Eircom League, having won the Double the previous season. However, the club was in something of a crisis, with former manager Roddy Collins' successor Pete Mahon struggling after a strong start to the season. Kenny's impact at Bohemians was immediate, as the side steadily moved away from the lower end of the league table. Kenny's squad reached that year's FAI Cup final, which saw Dundalk FC seal a close 2–1 victory over Bohemians.

In the 2002–2003 season, Kenny made some changes within the first-team squad and led Bohemians to a Premier Division title win, granting the side qualification for the 2003–04 UEFA Champions League first qualifying round. Although Bohemians did not progress to the second qualifying round, Kenny's revitalised squad celebrated a 3–0 win over FC BATE Borisov, the record-holders for the most Belarusian Premier League titles won.

The following season, Bohemians placed second to winners Shelbourne FC in the league, securing the club's place in the 2003–04 UEFA Cup first qualifying round. Kenny left Bohemians on 27 July 2004 with a league record of 49 wins in 96 games.

=== Derry City (first spell) ===
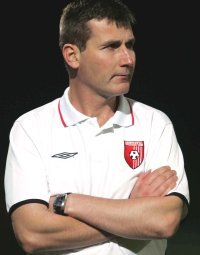
Kenny as Derry City manager

After just three weeks out of the game, Kenny returned to management at Derry City following the departure of Gavin Dykes, taking over from caretaker manager Peter Hutton. His time at the club was hugely successful and he has been credited for turning a team battling against relegation in the 2004 season into one which challenged for the Premier Division title in 2005, finishing runners-up.

Kenny also guided Derry City to their first advancement in European competition in over 40 years, the last seeing Norwegian side Lyn Oslo being knocked out. Derry qualified for the 2006–07 UEFA Cup by finishing runners-up in the Premier Division in the 2005 season. On 13 July 2006, Derry overcame two-time winners IFK Göteborg in the UEFA Cup first qualifying round 2–0 on aggregate. A 79th-minute header from Sean Hargan was enough to give Derry a shock win in the first leg, and Stephen O'Flynn ensured a 1–0 home victory from the penalty spot. Kenny was delighted with the win, stating:

They have won the UEFA Cup twice and only a few years ago were in the group stages of the Champions League, so this is a great night for everyone connected with Derry City. We were worthy winners. It is not as if we got a goal and held on. I think we played the better football.

This marked Derry City's first progression in European football since defeating Lyn Oslo more than 40 years ago.

Derry City were subsequently drawn against Scottish second-level side Gretna in the second qualifying round. On 10 August 2006, Derry claimed a 5–1 away win to gain a considerable advantage going into the home leg. This result is the largest away winning margin for a League of Ireland team in Europe. Following a 2–2 home draw with Gretna in the second leg and a 7–3 win on aggregate, Derry advanced to the UEFA Cup First Round. In the draw, held on 25 August 2006, Derry City were handed a tough tie against Paris Saint-Germain FC. The first leg was played at home at Brandywell Stadium on the evening of 14 September 2006 and ended in a 0–0 draw. The second leg was played at Parc des Princes on 28 September. PSG won the second leg 2–0 with goals from Pauleta and Edouard Cisse.

Kenny remained in charge of Derry City until 17 November 2006 for their final league game before moving to Dunfermline Athletic. Derry finished second in the league behind Shelbourne, who had a stronger goal difference. Kenny then made a return to Derry City to manage the club for the FAI Cup final win against St. Patrick's Athletic.

Kenny's total managerial record at Derry included 112 games managed, 65 games won, 29 games drawn, 18 games lost, 170 goals for, 80 goals against, and 57 clean sheets. His win percentage was 58%. During his time in charge, a total of 32 players represented the club, and 7 players that he managed went on to represent their country at international level.

=== Dunfermline Athletic ===
Kenny was confirmed as the new Dunfermline Athletic manager on 10 November 2006 and took up his position on 18 November 2006 where he was to watch Dunfermline's game against Dundee United from the stand.

Following his departure from the League of Ireland, his contributions during the 2006 season were still recognised by eircom / Soccer Writers Association of Ireland (SWAI) who nominated the former Derry City manager for their 'Personality of the Year' award on 13 December 2006.

In January 2007, Kenny brought in Jim O'Brien, Adam Hammill, Bobby Ryan, Jamie Harris and Stephen Glass to the club and later recruited released Falkirk striker Tam McManus. Kenny and his coaching team led Dunfermline to the Scottish Cup Final on 24 April 2007 having defeated Rangers, Hearts, and Partick Thistle, securing a 1–0 win over Hibernian in the semi-final replay. The Cup Final ended with a narrow 1–0 loss to Celtic. A 2–1 defeat at Inverness Caledonian Thistle coupled with St Mirren's 3–2 win at Motherwell saw the Fife club relegated to the First Division, despite having previously won four league games in a row.

On 4 December 2007, Kenny departed the club and striker Jim McIntyre, injured for much of Kenny's time at the club, took charge as caretaker.

=== Derry City (second spell) ===
Following his departure from Dunfermline Athletic and the exit of Derry City manager John Robertson, Kenny was strongly linked with a return to the League of Ireland club. Kenny was confirmed to have returned to Derry City on 28 December 2007.

In 2008, Derry City won the League of Ireland Cup with a confident 6–1 win over Wexford Youths. The club ended the season in third place in the league table, securing its entry to the 2009–10 UEFA Europa League second qualifying round.

After the club was relegated to the League of Ireland First Division in 2009 for entering administration, Kenny stayed on as Derry City manager, winning the 2010 First Division title and guiding the side back to the Premier Division. In 2011, Derry City's return to the Premier Division saw them claim a third-place finish in the league table and a League Cup win with a 1–0 victory over Cork City. Kenny left the club on 24 December 2011 to join Shamrock Rovers.

=== Shamrock Rovers ===
Following the departure of former manager Michael O'Neill, Kenny was confirmed as the new manager of Shamrock Rovers on 27 December 2011. The side ended the 2012 League of Ireland Premier Division in fourth place, three points behind closest rivals St Patrick's Athletics. Kenny departed the club on 11 September 2012.

=== Dundalk ===
In November 2012, Dundalk confirmed Kenny as its new first-team manager. The side mounted an unexpected title challenge in Kenny's first season and would finish runners-up, with a defeat to eventual champions St Patrick's Athletic ultimately costing them the title. But Kenny kept the nucleus of the new side together for the following season and in 2014, led the club to its first league title since 1994–95, landing a place in the 2013–14 UEFA Champions League second qualifying round. Dundalk also won 2014's League of Ireland Cup, the club's first League and League Cup Double.

The 2015 season saw Dundalk dominate: Kenny's squad clinched another League and FAI Cup Double, winning the title by 11 points and securing the Cup with a victory over Cork City in the 2015 FAI Cup final. They also won the Leinster Senior Cup, the club's first 'treble' since 1966–67. A third league title in a row was sealed with two games to spare in 2016.

2016 also saw the club qualify for the Champions League play-off round after they defeated FH of Iceland, then came from a goal down in the tie to defeat BATE Borisov 3–1 on aggregate. Dundalk drew Legia Warsaw for the play-off, with the first leg played in the Aviva Stadium in Dublin in front of a crowd of 30,417. They suffered a 2–0 defeat in the home leg, but shocked Legia in the return leg by taking a 1–0 lead. With Dundalk pushing for the equaliser that would have taken the tie to extra-time, Legia scored on the break and won the tie 3–1 on aggregate. As a result, Dundalk qualified for the group stage of the Europa League, making them only the second Irish team to have done so. A draw with AZ Alkmaar in the Netherlands, followed by a victory over Maccabi Tel Aviv in Tallaght Stadium, were the first points earned by an Irish club in the group stage of European competition.

In 2017, after the European run, Dundalk won the League Cup again and finished second place in the league. The club secured a place in that year's FAI Cup Final, but following a 1–1 draw that took the game to penalties, opponents Cork City ultimately took the Cup. The club's European form had attracted interest from abroad and a consortium of American investors, backed by sports-investors PEAK6, completed a takeover in January 2018. That year, Kenny's side won another League and Cup Double, the second under Kenny and fourth in the club's history, breaking points-total and goals scored-total records.

In 2017, after the European run, Dundalk won the League Cup again and finished second place in the league. The club secured a place in that year's FAI Cup Final, but following a 1–1 draw that took the game to penalties, opponents Cork City ultimately took the Cup. The club's European form had attracted interest from abroad and a consortium of American investors, backed by sports-investors PEAK6, completed a takeover in January 2018.

In 2018, Kenny's side won another League and Cup Double, the second under Kenny and fourth in the club's history, breaking points-total and goals scored-total records in the process.

=== Republic of Ireland U21 ===
On 25 November 2018, Kenny was appointed as Republic of Ireland U21 manager following the departure of Noel King.

Kenny's U21s enjoyed a record-breaking 2019, ending the year at the top of their 2021 UEFA European Championships qualifying group. The same year, Ireland achieved its highest-ever finish in the prestigious Toulon Tournament (fourth position). Kenny's team secured victories over China U23 and Bahrain U23 and a draw against Mexico U23 in the group stage, with a highly competitive semi-final ending in a 2–0 win for Brazil U23.

=== Republic of Ireland ===
On 3 September 2020, Kenny's first game in charge of the Republic of Ireland's national team against Bulgaria in the UEFA Nations League ended in a 1–1 draw. On 8 October, Ireland lost 4–2 on penalties to Slovakia in the UEFA Euro 2020 play-off semi-final in Bratislava. The Republic of Ireland completed 2020 with a record of 4 draws and 4 defeats. In March 2021, Ireland played two 2022 FIFA World Cup qualifiers, with a loss of 3–2 to Serbia and a 1–0 home defeat at the hands of Luxembourg.

On 1 September 2021, Ireland led Portugal 1–0 in their third 2022 FIFA World Cup qualifier in Estádio Algarve with two minutes to play in normal time. The side ended up losing 2–1, with Cristiano Ronaldo scoring two late goals. Next, Ireland were only able to draw 1-1 at home with Azerbaijan; a late equaliser from Shane Duffy salvaged a point for the Irish against the team ranked 117th in the world. On 9 October 2021, Ireland won 3–0 away to the same country in the reverse fixture and three days later on 12 October, Kenny's squad defeated Qatar 4–0 in a friendly. On 14 November 2021, Ireland completed their qualification campaign for the 2022 FIFA World Cup with a 3–0 win away to Luxembourg, but still came third, eight points below Portugal.

On 9 March 2022, Kenny signed a new contract with Ireland to remain in charge until after UEFA Euro 2024. In June 2022, Ireland played four 2022–23 UEFA Nations League fixtures. The campaign started with a 1–0 loss away to Armenia, ranked 92nd in the world, followed by a 1–0 loss at home to Ukraine, before defeating Scotland 3-0. The win over Scotland was Ireland's first competitive home win in three years and their first competitive win at home to a side ranked above them since the win against Bosnia in the UEFA Euro 2016 qualifying play-offs in November 2015. The last of the four games was a 1–1 draw against Ukraine in Łódź. Ireland finished their participation in 2022–23 UEFA Nations League on 27 September 2023 at home to Armenia, with Robbie Brady's penalty in additional time securing a 3-2 win.

On 27 March 2023, Ireland opened their UEFA Euro 2024 qualifying campaign with a 1–0 loss at home to France. In June 2023, they lost 2–1 away to Greece before winning 3–0 at home to Gibraltar. On 7 September 2023, the game with France at the Parc des Princes ended in a 2–0 loss for Ireland and a 2–1 defeat to the Netherlands followed three days later. Any hopes of qualifying were extinguished on 13 October 2023 with a home 2-0 loss to Greece, still with two games to play. Ireland finished campaign in the fourth place, seven points below Greece with their only points won against Gibraltar.

Kenny's contract with the Football Association of Ireland was not renewed after his final game on 22 November 2023 a day after a 1–1 draw with New Zealand. Kenny faced criticism from some media pundits during his reign, but he also had support from experienced pundits such as Johnny Giles. The attendances at games remained high and he had strong support from his players throughout his time as manager. Kenny reflected upon the criticism some months after his departure and said: "We didn't achieve everything we wanted to achieve of course but the public believed it cos they filled the stadiums, there was a sense of optimism that was different. I know we were far from perfect, but we consistently had full houses and fully believed in what we were doing, the players believed in myself as a coach and what we were doing was the right way."

=== St Patrick's Athletic ===
On 16 May 2024, Kenny returned to the League of Ireland Premier Division with the club he started his coaching career at, signing a contract until the end of 2029 with St Patrick's Athletic. After a difficult start, his first league win with the club came on 31 May 2024, a 2–1 win over Galway United at Richmond Park. On 10 June 2024, Kenny announced his former player Brian Gartland as his assistant coach. On 25 July 2024, Kenny took charge of his first European fixture with the club, beating Vaduz of Liechtenstein 3–1 in a UEFA Conference League tie at Richmond Park, with Jake Mulraney scoring a brace and captain Joe Redmond heading home a third goal. A 2–2 draw away to Vaduz then set up a tie with Sabah of Azerbaijan, who Kenny's side beat 1–0 at Tallaght Stadium before again winning 1–0 away at the Bank Respublika Arena. In the UEFA Conference League Play-Off Round, they faced Turkish side İstanbul Başakşehir, drawing 0–0 at Tallaght Stadium before narrowly being beaten 2–0 in the return leg at the Başakşehir Fatih Terim Stadium through 2 goals in the last 25 minutes while down to 10 men. On 27 September 2024, he led the team to a 3–0 win away to Shamrock Rovers at Tallaght Stadium, in what was their first win away to their rivals since 2018. On 8 October 2024, Kenny claimed his first trophy as Pats manager when his second string side beat St Mochta's 2–1 in the final of the 2023–24 Leinster Senior Cup. With the club in 8th place in the table going into their game on 1 September 2024, Kenny guided his side to a club record equalling 9 consecutive league victories to secure 3rd place at the end of his first season at the club, securing UEFA Conference League football for the following season.

The 2025 season saw Kenny's side go on another European run, as their UEFA Conference League campaign saw them beat Lithuanian side Hegelmann 1–0 at home and 2–0 away which become the club's record away victory in Europe, then beating Estonian club Nõmme Kalju 1–0 at home then drawing 2–2 away in the second leg after extra time to send them through. The Third Qualifying Round saw them face Turkish giants Beşiktaş, in which they found themselves 4–0 down at half time in the first leg at Tallaght Stadium, then won the second half by a goal, before remarkably taking a 2–0 lead at Beşiktaş Stadium in the second leg to narrow the aggregate deficit to just 1 goal with 48 minutes of the tie left, although eventually they were defeated 3–2 on the night and 7–3 on aggregate. Kenny's first full season with the club proved to be a disappointment overall, despite having the most clean sheets and least goals conceded in the league, they missed out on a European place by finishing in 5th place, lost to bottom of the table Cork City in the Semi Final of the FAI Cup and were defeated by First Division side Dundalk in the Final of the Leinster Senior Cup.

== Personal life ==
Kenny is married and has four children; two sons and two daughters. His son Eoin Kenny is a professional footballer, having signed his first professional contract on 5 March 2023, with his father's former club Dundalk. On 14 June 2025, his daughter Caoimhe was named Miss Ireland for 2026.

== Managerial statistics ==
As of match played 30 October 2026

Managerial record by team and tenure
Team	From	To	Record							
Team	From	To	G	W	D	L	GF	GA	GD	Win %
(Republic of Ireland) Longford Town	1 July 1998	7 December 2001	112	50	30	32	139	100	+39	44.64
(Republic of Ireland) Bohemians	10 December 2001	27 July 2004	128	66	35	27	229	123	+106	51.56
(Republic of Ireland) Derry City	19 August 2004	10 November 2006	110	67	26	17	165	79	+86	60.91
(Scotland) Dunfermline Athletic	13 November 2006	4 December 2007	41	8	11	22	23	57	−34	19.51
(Republic of Ireland) Derry City	28 December 2007	24 December 2011	175	93	45	37	294	137	+157	53.14
(Republic of Ireland) Shamrock Rovers	27 December 2011	11 September 2012	37	19	11	7	61	42	+19	51.35
(Republic of Ireland) Dundalk	21 November 2012	24 November 2018	298	200	42	56	622	243	+379	67.11
Republic of Ireland U21	25 November 2018	4 April 2020	12	7	2	3	20	10	+10	58.33
Republic of Ireland	4 April 2020	22 November 2023	40	11	12	17	47	41	+6	27.50
(Republic of Ireland) St Patrick's Athletic	16 May 2024	Present	126	64	30	32	205	121	+84	50.79
Total			1,079	585	244	250	1,805	953	+852	54.22

Note: Club games included are competitive games only.

== Honours ==
=== Manager ===
Longford Town

- FAI Cup
  - Runner-up (1): 2001

Bohemians

- League of Ireland Premier Division
  - Winner (1): 2002–03

Derry City

- League of Ireland First Division
  - Winner (1): 2010
- FAI Cup
  - Winner (1): 2006
  - Runner-up (1): 2008
- League of Ireland Cup
  - Winner (4): 2005, 2006, 2008, 2011

Dunfermline Athletic

- Scottish Cup
  - Runner-up (1): 2007
- Scottish Challenge Cup
  - Runner-up (1): 2008

Shamrock Rovers

- Leinster Senior Cup
  - Winner (1): 2011–12

Dundalk

- League of Ireland Premier Division
  - Winner (4): 2014, 2015, 2016, 2018
  - Runner-up (2): 2013, 2017
- FAI Cup
  - Winner (2): 2015, 2018
  - Runner-up (2): 2016, 2017
- League of Ireland Cup
  - Winner (2): 2014, 2017
- President of Ireland's Cup
  - Winner (1): 2015
  - Runner-up (3): 2016, 2017, 2018
- Leinster Senior Cup
  - Winner (1): 2014–15
  - Runner-up (1): 2016–17
- Setanta Sports Cup
  - Runner-up (1): 2014

St Patrick's Athletic

- Leinster Senior Cup
  - Winner (1): 2023–24
  - Runner-up (2): 2024–25, 2025–26

=== Individual ===
- PFAI Manager of the Year: 2013, 2014, 2015, 2018
- Irish Tatler Man of the Year: 2016
- Philips Sports Manager of the Year: 2016
- RTÉ Sports Manager of the Year Award: 2016

== See also ==
- List of football managers with the most matches
