= Derek McGrath (footballer) =

Irish footballer

Personal information
- Date of birth: 21 January 1972 (age 54)
- Place of birth: Dublin, Ireland
- Position: Midfielder

Senior career*
Years	Team	Apps	(Gls)
1989–1991	Brighton & Hove Albion	6	(0)
1992–1996	Shamrock Rovers	120	(23)
1996–1998	Bohemians	60	(6)
1998–2000	Waterford United	40	(5)
2000–2001	Kilkenny City	24	(2)
2001–2002	Monaghan United	18	(2)
2002–2003	Dublin City	?	(8)
2003	Glenavon	8	(1)
2003–2004	Armagh City	?	(?)

International career
1988–1990	Republic of Ireland U17	6	(0)
1992–1994	Republic of Ireland U21	9	(1)
- * Club domestic league appearances and goals

Derek McGrath (born 21 January 1972) is an Irish retired footballer.

== Club career ==
Derek was a midfielder who played for Shamrock Rovers, Bohemians, Waterford United, Kilkenny City and Monaghan United during his career in the League of Ireland.

He signed for Rovers in January 1992 from Brighton & Hove Albion where he had made 6 appearances and made his debut at Bray Wanderers on 19 January.

McGrath had made one appearance for Brighton in the 1990-91 FA Cup at Anfield.

He scored 7 goals in 27 league appearances as Rovers won the League in 1994. He also made 2 appearances in the 1994-95 UEFA Cup for the Hoops.

He moved to Bohemians in July 1996 and made his debut in a 1996-97 UEFA Cup tie against FC Dinamo Minsk.

He made 4 appearances for Bohs in Europe all in the UEFA Cup.

His father Joe played and managed in the League of Ireland. Derek was managed by his father briefly in 1998 while at Bohs and again at Kilkenny City.

== International career ==
McGrath scored for the Republic of Ireland national under-19 football team in May 1989 in a 1990 UEFA European Under-18 Football Championship qualifier against Malta.

He was sent off in the final qualifier in Bulgaria as Ireland lost but qualified.

Derek was capped nine times by Irish Under 21 team scoring once in October 1992 in a 1994 UEFA European Under-21 Football Championship qualifier.

He also represented his country at U15, U16 and youth level and played at the 1990 UEFA European Under-18 Football Championship and 1991 FIFA World Youth Championship

== Honours ==
- League of Ireland: 1
  - Shamrock Rovers 1993/94
