= Neil Ogden =

English footballer

Personal information
- Date of birth: 29 November 1975 (age 50)
- Place of birth: Higher End, England
- Position: Defender

Senior career*
Years	Team	Apps	(Gls)
1992–1996	Wigan Athletic	15	(0)
1995–1996	Northwich Victoria F.C.	2	(0)
1996–1997	AmaZulu F.C.	?	(?)
1997–1999	Sligo Rovers	42	(6)
1999–2000	Shelbourne	5	(0)
1999–2000	Galway United	15	(1)
2000–2003	Portadown	71	(4)
2003–2006	Larne	?	(?)
- * Club domestic league appearances and goals

Neil Ogden (born 29 November 1975 in Higher End, England) is an English former footballer. He retired football in 2006 to look after his children.

== Club career ==
Ogden was an apprentice at hometown club Wigan Athletic and made his Football League debut at Vetch Field on 4 May 1993. After three seasons Ogden briefly played in the Football Conference and the Premier Soccer League before moving to Sligo Rovers in the summer of 1997 under Nicky Reid. He made his League of Ireland debut on 30 August 1997. During that 1997–98 League of Ireland season, Sligo won their first ever FAI League Cup.

Ogden signed to the Shelbourne for the 1999-2000 League of Ireland season under Dermot Keely, and made his debut in the 1999 UEFA Intertoto Cup tie against Neuchâtel Xamax at the Stade de la Maladière (1924). However, after only 5 league appearances he moved to Galway United in November 1999. In January 2000, the Tribesmen knocked the defending League champions out of the FAI Cup and beat Sligo 5–0 with Ogden scoring.

Ogden signed for Portadown F.C. in the summer of 2000 and in his second season won the IFA Premiership. He made two appearances in the 2002–03 UEFA Champions League against FC Belshina Bobruisk At the end of the 2002–03 Irish League season, Ogden signed to Larne F.C. Under Jimmy McGeough, Larne reached the 2004–05 Irish Cup Final, where Ogden opened the scoring in a 5–1 loss. In November 2005, Ogden's contract at Inver Park was terminated by Kenny Shiels.

== Honours ==
- Irish League
  - Portadown 2001/2002
- Mid-Ulster Cup: 2
  - Portadown 2001/2002, 2002/2003
- League Cup
  - Sligo Rovers 1997/98
