= 2017 League of Ireland Cup final =

- Event: 2017 League of Ireland Cup
Shamrock Rovers	Dundalk
0	3
- Date: 16 September 2017
- Venue: Tallaght Stadium, Dublin
- Referee: Derek Tomney
- Attendance: 4,102

The 2017 League of Ireland Cup final was the final match of the 2017 League of Ireland Cup (called the EA Sports Cup for sponsorship purposes), a knock-out association football competition contested annually by clubs affiliated with the League of Ireland. It took place on 17 September 2017 at the Tallaght Stadium in Dublin, and was contested by Dundalk and Shamrock Rovers. Dundalk won 3–0 to win the competition for the sixth time.

== Background ==
The League Cup was the first trophy of the 2017 League of Ireland season. The two sides had met three times in the League already that season, with Dundalk winning the first match and Rovers the next two. Dundalk had last won the cup in 2014 (defeating Rovers in the final), and reached the final by defeating UCD in a penalty shoot-out (after a 1–1 draw), Waterford (3–0), and Galway United (3–0).

Shamrock Rovers had last won the League Cup in 2013. To get to the final they overcame Bohemians (3–1), Longford Town (1–0) and Cork City (1–0 after extra-time).

The final was broadcast live on Eir Sport.

== Match ==
=== Summary ===
David McMillan put Dundalk ahead with a header from a corner after five minutes, and there were chances for both sides in the rest of the first half, with Rovers hitting the post on one occasion. The second half saw Dundalk dominate, particularly after Aaron Bolger was sent off for a reckless challenge on Dundalk defender Niclas Vemmelund. Patrick McEleney got their second with a strike from the edge of the penalty area in the 81st minute, and deep into injury time substitute Thomas Stewart scored a third to seal the club's sixth League Cup.

=== Details ===
16 September 2017
15:00

Shamrock Rovers	0–3	Dundalk
Aaron Bolger (yellow card) 64' (yellow-red card)	Report	David McMillan 5'; Patrick McEleney 81'; Thomas Stewart 90+3'

Tallaght Stadium
Attendance: 4,102
Referee: Derek Tomney

Shamrock Rovers	Dundalk

GK		(Canada) Tomer Chencinski
DF		(Republic of Ireland) David Webster
DF		(Cape Verde) Roberto Lopes
DF		(Republic of Ireland) Simon Madden
MF		(Republic of Ireland) Trevor Clarke
MF		(Republic of Ireland) Ryan Connolly	(substituted off) 55'
MF		(Republic of Ireland) Ronan Finn
MF		(Republic of Ireland) Aaron Bolger
MF		(Republic of Ireland) Brandon Miele
MF		(Republic of Ireland) David McAllister	(substituted off) 84'
CF		(Republic of Ireland) Michael O'Connor	(substituted off) 69'
Substitutes:
MF	22	(Scotland) Cameron King	(substituted in) 55'
MF	29	(Republic of Ireland) Gary Shaw	(substituted in) 69'
FW	10	(Republic of Ireland) James Doona	(substituted in) 84'
Manager:
(Republic of Ireland) Stephen Bradley

GK	22	(Romania) Gabriel Sava
RB	2	(Republic of Ireland) Seán Gannon
CB	19	(Denmark) Niclas Vemmelund
CB	15	(Republic of Ireland) Seán Hoare
LB	12	(Republic of Ireland) Shane Grimes
RM	10	(Republic of Ireland) Jamie McGrath	(substituted off) 87'
CM	5	(Republic of Ireland) Chris Shields (c)
CM	18	(Republic of Ireland) Robbie Benson
LM	7	(Northern Ireland) Michael Duffy
CAM	11	(Republic of Ireland) Patrick McEleney	(substituted off) 88'
CF	9	(Republic of Ireland) David McMillan	(substituted off) 90'
Substitutes:
MF	24	(Republic of Ireland) Stephen Kinsella	(substituted in) 87'
MF	6	(Republic of Ireland) Stephen O'Donnell	(substituted in) 88'
FW	26	(Northern Ireland) Thomas Stewart	(substituted in) 90'
Manager:
(Republic of Ireland) Stephen Kenny
