= Jonathan Speak =

Northern Irish footballer and manager (born 1965)

Personal information
- Full name: Jonathan Speak
- Date of birth: 12 August 1965 (age 61)
- Place of birth: Sion Mills, Northern Ireland
- Position: Striker

Senior career*
Years	Team	Apps	(Gls)
1983–1984	Ballymena United	13	(6)
1984–1985	Dundalk	10	(2)
1985–1987	Ballymena United	3	(22)
1987–1992	Derry City	7	(69)
1992–1994	Ballymena United	47	(19)
1994–2003	Finn Harps	152	(64)
Total		235	(185)

Managerial career
- 2001–2003: Finn Harps
- 2004: Omagh Town
- * Club domestic league appearances and goals

Jonathan Speak (born 1965) is a Northern Irish former footballer and manager. Speak was top scorer in the 1987–88 League of Ireland Premier Division and in the 1995–96 League of Ireland First Division. He is joint thirteenth in the all-time League of Ireland goalscoring list with 135 league goals.

== Club career ==
Speak started his playing career at Limavady United in 1982 before transferring to Ballymena United in 1983 where he was top scorer with 11 league goals. He then signed for Dundalk and made his League of Ireland debu on 16 September 1984. After one season he moved back to Ballymena where in 2 seasons he was their top scorer.

He joined Derry City in August 1987. He was the 1987–88 League of Ireland Premier Division top scorer with 24 goals. Six of these goals came in one game in a 7–2 win over Sligo in April 1988. Speak also helped Derry to a domestic treble in the 1988–89 season. After 5 years at the Brandywell he moved back to Ballymena. In the 1993/94 season he again topped their scorers chart with 13 league goals.

He moved back to the League of Ireland to join Finn Harps in August 1994 for £14,000. He led the Harps gallop to promotion in 1995–96, scoring 17 goals that season. Indeed, he was the club's top scorer for the next three seasons. Speak played 209 times for Harps in all competitions and scored 81 goals, 64 league goals in 152 matches. He also scored the winner in the 1999 FAI Cup semi-final in Terryland Park against Galway to send Harps to their first Cup Final in 25 years and scored again in one of the FAI Cup Final replays in Tolka Park.

== Managerial career ==
When Gavin Dykes took over the managerial reins from Charlie McGeever in 2000, he appointed Speak as his assistant. Speak was also manager of a very talented Harps Under 21 team at the time. When Dykes resigned after an abysmal run of games that left Harps rooted to the bottom of the Premier table, Speak took over as caretaker, if somewhat reluctantly. He took Harps on an amazing unbeaten run of 14 games only to be cruelly relegated on the last day of the season.

He took on the position of player-manager on a permanent position the following season (2001/02), which would see only the champions of the First Division gain automatic promotion. Drogheda United would win the league, again on the last day of the season as Harps finished second. They faced Longford Town in the playoffs and after a one nil defeat away in Flancare Park, Harps produced one of their best displays in Finn Park since the '70s. They went one down early in the first half but they battled like warriors with Kevin McHugh scoring a superb hat-trick. Unfortunately it wasn't to be as Speak conceded an injury time penalty in extra time and Harps were then beaten on penalties.

The following season saw Waterford United make all the running to go up as champions and once more Harps had to settle for runners-up spot and a place in the playoffs which was abruptly ended by Galway United in the semi-final. Speak did lead Harps to lift their first national silverware in 28 years beating Kildare County 4–0 on aggregate in the final of the First Division Cup in September 2002.

The 2003 season would be the first to be played in the calendar year. Speak started what would be his third and final season as Harps manager and in August Harps were sitting top of the league. With Dublin City, Kildare County and Bray Wanderers all pushing hard for the coveted top spot and automatic promotion, there was to be little room for error. Unfortunately three points from twelve in Harps last four games, including a home defeat to Sligo and a draw in Finn Park against leaders Dublin City left Harps in fourth place and five points off the pace. Even though Harps had only lost two games all season, too many draws and dropped points against poor opposition signalled the end of the road for the Sion-man and his nine-year association with the club.

He managed Omagh Town in 2004.

== Honours ==
- League of Ireland Premier Division:
  - Derry City 1988–89
- FAI Cup:
  - Derry City 1989
- League of Ireland Cup: 3
  - Derry City 1988/89, 1990/91, 1991/92
- Irish Cup:
  - Ballymena United 1984
- Irish News Cup:
  - Finn Harps 1998/99
