= 1997–98 League of Ireland First Division =

League of Ireland First Division
- Season: 1997–98
- Champions: Waterford United
- Promoted: Bray Wanderers
- Top goalscorer: Fergal Coleman: 13 (Galway United)

The 1997–98 League of Ireland First Division season was the 13th season of the League of Ireland First Division.

== Overview ==
The First Division was contested by 10 teams and Waterford United won the division.

== Final table ==
| Pos | Team | Pld | W | D | L | GF | GA | GD | Pts | Promotion or qualification |
|---|---|---|---|---|---|---|---|---|---|---|
| 1 | Waterford United F.C. | 27 | 18 | 6 | 3 | 35 | 17 | +18 | 60 | Promoted to Premier Division |
| 2 | Bray Wanderers A.F.C. | 27 | 17 | 3 | 7 | 51 | 21 | +30 | 54 | Promoted to Premier Division |
| 3 | Limerick F.C. | 27 | 14 | 8 | 5 | 41 | 25 | +16 | 50 | Lost promotion/relegation play-off |
| 4 | Galway United F.C. | 27 | 13 | 4 | 10 | 38 | 29 | +9 | 43 | |
| 5 | Home Farm Everton F.C. | 27 | 9 | 11 | 7 | 28 | 22 | +6 | 38 | |
| 6 | Cobh Ramblers F.C. | 27 | 10 | 5 | 12 | 32 | 41 | −9 | 35 | |
| 7 | Athlone Town A.F.C. | 27 | 8 | 7 | 12 | 31 | 37 | −6 | 31 | |
| 8 | St Francis F.C. | 27 | 7 | 8 | 12 | 29 | 40 | −11 | 29 | |
| 9 | Monaghan United F.C. | 27 | 6 | 4 | 17 | 26 | 44 | −18 | 22 | |
| 10 | Longford Town F.C. | 27 | 2 | 6 | 19 | 12 | 47 | −35 | 12 | |

== Promotion/relegation play-off ==
Third placed Limerick F.C. played off against University College Dublin A.F.C. who finished in tenth place in the 1997–98 League of Ireland Premier Division. The winner would compete in the 1998–99 League of Ireland Premier Division.

=== 1st leg ===
| 5 May 1998 | UCD | 2–1 | Limerick F.C. |

=== 2nd leg ===
| 8 May 1998 | Limerick F.C. | 1–3 | UCD |

UCD won 5–2 on aggregate and retained their place in the Premier Division.

== See also ==
- 1997–98 League of Ireland Premier Division
