= Brian Morrisroe =

Irish footballer

Personal information
- Full name: Brian Morrisroe
- Date of birth: 17 April 1972 (age 54)
- Place of birth: Dublin, Republic of Ireland
- Height: 1.78 m (5 ft 10 in)
- Position: Midfielder

Senior career*
Years	Team	Apps	(Gls)
1993–1997	St Patrick's Athletic	61	(9)
1997–1999	Shamrock Rovers	50	(8)
1999–2001	Dundalk	39	(6)
2000–2001	Ballymena United	5	(0)
2001–2002	Athlone Town	29	(7)
2002–2003	Dublin City	?	(?)
2003	→ Limerick (loan)	?	(?)
2008	Sporting Fingal	11	(0)
- * Club domestic league appearances and goals

Brian Morrisroe (born 17 April 1972 in Dublin) is an Irish footballer who plays for Manortown Utd.

A midfielder, he made his League of Ireland debut for St Patrick's Athletic at Dundalk on 26 September 1993. Morrisroe scored the winner against Southampton F.C. in a friendly in July 1995.

Morrisroe played in two 1996–97 UEFA Cup games for the Richmond Park (football ground) side.

He moved to Shamrock Rovers in June 1997.

Morrisroe made two appearances in the 1998 UEFA Intertoto Cup for Rovers before moving to Dundalk, making his debut in a 1–0 home defeat to Longford Town on 22 August 1999. He subsequently helped the Lilywhites on their way to promotion from the First Division in 2001, before leaving Oriel Park to sign for Ballymena United in February 2001. He had a subsequent spell at Athlone Town.

He spent a few years out of the League of Ireland playing with Glenmore Dundrum in the Leinster Senior League.

He signed for Sporting Fingal in 2008 and made his Sporting debut on 4 July 2008, where he was Man of the Match and went on to make 11 total league appearances.

== Honours ==
- League of Ireland
  - St Patrick's Athletic 1995/96

FAI Cup Runner up 1995/96

- FAI Super Cup
  - Shamrock Rovers 1998
