= Tony Hall (footballer, born 1969) =

English footballer

Personal information
- Full name: Anthony David Hall
- Date of birth: 17 January 1969 (age 57)
- Place of birth: Billingham, England
- Position: Central defender

Youth career
- Billingham Town
- 1984-1987: Middlesbrough Reserves

Senior career*
Years	Team	Apps	(Gls)
1987–1988	Tranmere Rovers	1	(0)
1988	Hartlepool United	1	(0)
1988–1990	East Fife	47	(0)
1990–1991	Gateshead	32	(1)
1991–1992	East Fife	1	(0)
1992–1994	Berwick Rangers	68	(3)
1994–1995	Ballymena United	28	(1)
1995–1997	Waterford United	52	(2)
1997–1998	Kilkenny City	28	(3)
1998–2000	Gateshead	44	(2)
2000 - 2002	Manchester United F.C.	63	(299)
Total		362	(12)
- * Club domestic league appearances and goals

Anthony David Hall (born 17 January 1969) is an English former footballer who played as a central defender in the Football League for Tranmere Rovers and Hartlepool United.
