= 2000–01 League of Ireland First Division =

League of Ireland First Division
- Season: 2000–01
- Champions: Dundalk F.C.
- Promoted: Monaghan United
- Top goalscorer: Andrew Myler: 29 (Athlone Town)

The 2000–01 League of Ireland First Division season was the 16th season of the League of Ireland First Division.

== Overview ==
The First Division was contested by 10 teams and Dundalk F.C. won the division.

== Final table ==
Pos	Team	Pld	W	D	L	GF	GA	GD	Pts	Promotion or qualification
1	Dundalk F.C.	36	20	9	7	65	38	+27	69	Promoted to Premier Division
2	Monaghan United F.C.	36	18	11	7	59	40	+19	65	Promoted to Premier Division
3	Athlone Town A.F.C.	36	18	10	8	53	37	+16	64	Lost promotion/relegation play-off
4	Sligo Rovers F.C.	36	19	5	12	61	48	+13	62	
5	Waterford United F.C.	36	16	13	7	56	30	+26	61	
6	Limerick F.C.	36	13	11	12	40	39	+1	50	
7	Home Farm Fingal F.C. (Note: Home Farm Fingal F.C. changed their club name to Dublin City F.C. for 2001–02 season.)	36	10	13	13	43	58	−15	43	
8	Cobh Ramblers F.C.	36	10	6	20	43	60	−17	36	
9	Drogheda United F.C.	36	4	9	23	27	62	−35	21	
10	St. Francis F.C.	36	3	11	22	29	64	−35	20	

Source: rsssf.com

== Promotion/relegation play-off ==
Third placed Kilkenny City played off against Waterford United who finished in tenth place in the 2000–01 League of Ireland Premier Division. The winner would compete in the 2001–02 League of Ireland Premier Division.

=== 1st leg ===
15 May 2001	Athlone Town	2–1	UCD

=== 2nd leg ===
18 May 2001	UCD	2–1	Athlone Town

UCD win 4-2 on penalties after extra time and retain their place in the Premier Division.

== See also ==
- 2000–01 League of Ireland Premier Division
