= Andrew Myler =

Irish footballer (born 1975)

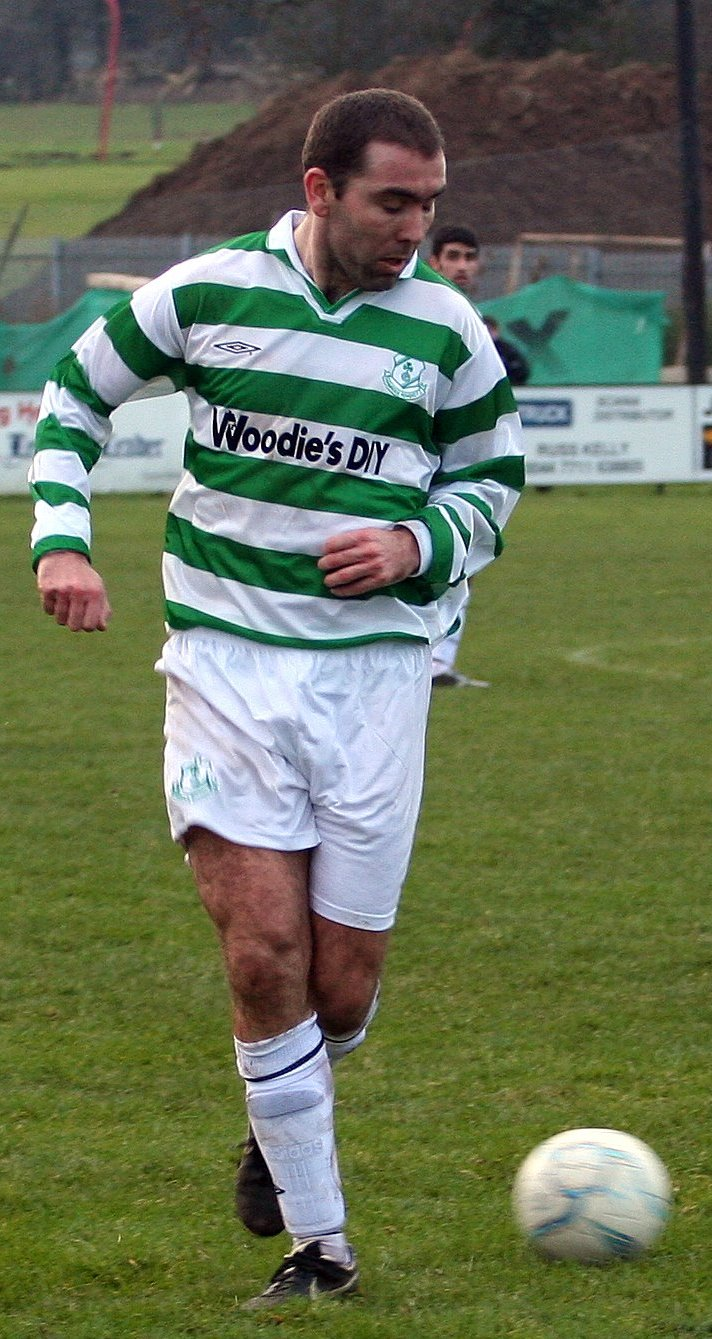

Personal information
- Full name: Andrew Myler
- Date of birth: 2 December 1975 (age 50)
- Place of birth: Dublin, Republic of Ireland
- Position: Forward

Youth career
- St Kevin's Boys

Senior career*
Years	Team	Apps	(Gls)
1994–1997	UCD	48	(13)
1997–1998	Newry Town	13	(2)
1998–2000	Monaghan United	48	(22)
2000–2002	Athlone Town	55	(38)
2001–2002	Waterford United	8	(4)
2002–2004	Drogheda United	91	(33)
2005–2006	Longford Town	30	(4)
2006–2007	Shamrock Rovers	45	(15)
2008	Bray Wanderers	15	(2)
Total		353	(133)

Managerial career
- 2009: Shamrock Rovers A
- 2010: Shamrock Rovers U20
- 2019–2023: UCD
- * Club domestic league appearances and goals

Andrew Myler (born 2 December 1975) is an Irish former footballer, and former manager of UCD. Myler left UCD at the end of the 2023 campaign, after the club was relegated back to the First Division.

== Playing career ==
He began his professional career at UCD where he made his League debut at St. James's Gate on 9 January 1994. He scored his first league goal on his first start at Longford Town on 27 March 1994. His first league hat trick was against Finn Harps on 6 September 1996.

He also played for Newry Town, Monaghan United, Athlone Town, Waterford United and Drogheda United before Longford. He claims that his happiest days as a footballer came with Drogheda United where he has officially been accepted into the club's hall of fame. He is now known as a legend in Drogheda and his name is still sung week in week out by the Drogheda fans.

Myler was signed by Shamrock Rovers from Longford Town in July 2006 making his debut against Galway United on 4 August.

Always a Rovers fan, Myler broke into the top 20 all time League of Ireland goal scorers in August 2007. His hat-trick on 14 September against Galway United brought his all-time league total to 129 goals

In his career he has been top scorer in the League of Ireland First Division for two seasons in 1999–2000 and 2000–01. In his two seasons at Rovers Myler scored 20 goals in 48 total appearances.

He signed for Bray in December 2007 Myler retired at the end of the 2008 season with a total of 131 career league goals and scored in his last game As of 2012 Myler is sixteenth in the all-time League of Ireland goalscoring list with 131 league goals.

== Coach ==
Myler moved on to managing the Shamrock Rovers reserve and youth teams. In his first season, he managed the Rovers team that won the 2009 A Championship. In his second season, he managed the U20s as they won the League of Ireland U20 Division title . He was promoted to the first team staff in 2011 where he was part of the Premier Division league winning and Europa League qualifying set up. Myler left Shamrock Rovers at the end of 2011.

He now manages first division side UCD, where he also works.

== Honours ==
=== Player ===
UCD;

- League of Ireland First Division: 1
  - 1994–95
- League of Ireland First Division Shield: 1
  - 1994–95
- Leinster Senior Cup: 2
  - 1994–95, 1995–96

Shamrock Rovers

- League of Ireland First Division: 1
  - 2006

=== Manager ===
Shamrock Rovers

- A Championship: 1
  - 2009
- League of Ireland U20 Division: 1
  - 2010

=== Individual ===
- League of Ireland First Division Top Scorer: 2
  - 1999–2000, 2000–01
