= 1999–2000 League of Ireland Premier Division =

15th season of the League of Ireland Premier Division

League of Ireland Premier Division
- Season: 1999–2000
- Dates: 13 August 1999 – 23 April 2000
- Teams: 12
- Champions: Shelbourne (9th title)
- Relegated: Waterford United; Sligo Rovers; Drogheda United
- UEFA Champions League: Shelbourne
- UEFA Cup: Cork City; Bohemians
- UEFA Intertoto Cup: UCD
- FAI Super Cup: Shelbourne; Cork City; Bohemians; UCD
- Top goalscorer: Pat Morley (Cork City); 20 goals

The 1999–2000 League of Ireland Premier Division, known as the eircom League Premier Division for sponsorship reasons, was the 15th season of the League of Ireland Premier Division, the top tier for association football clubs in the Republic of Ireland, since the establishment of the division in 1985.

The competition began on 13 August 1999 and concluded on 23 April 2000. The division was made up of 12 teams.

On 23 April 2000, after finishing tenth in the league, Waterford United qualified for the promotion / relegation playoff. Their opponents from the First Division were Kilkenny City. Waterford lost both playoff legs to confirm their relegation to the First Division on 6 May 2000.

The division was won by Shelbourne, who secured their first league title since 1991–92.

== Standings ==
The season saw each team playing three rounds of games, playing every other team three times, totalling 33 games.

=== Final Table ===
Pos	Team	Pld	W	D	L	GF	GA	GD	Pts	Qualification or relegation
1	Shelbourne (C)	33	19	12	2	49	20	+29	69	Qualification to Champions League first qualifying round
2	Cork City	33	16	10	7	53	32	+21	58	Qualification to UEFA Cup qualifying round
3	Bohemians	33	16	9	8	40	23	+17	57	Qualification to UEFA Cup qualifying round
4	UCD	33	13	12	8	40	29	+11	51	Qualification to Intertoto Cup first round
5	Shamrock Rovers	33	13	11	9	49	36	+13	50	
6	St Patrick's Athletic	33	13	11	9	40	31	+9	50	
7	Derry City	33	12	10	11	32	38	−6	46	
8	Finn Harps	33	8	10	15	39	41	−2	34	
9	Galway United	33	8	10	15	32	49	−17	34	
10	Waterford United (R)	33	7	12	14	24	38	−14	33	Qualification to Relegation play-off
11	Sligo Rovers (R)	33	5	10	18	31	60	−29	25	Relegation to League of Ireland First Division
12	Drogheda United (R)	33	4	11	18	21	53	−32	23	Relegation to League of Ireland First Division

Source: www.rsssf.com
(C) Champions; (R) Relegated

== Results ==
=== Matches 1–22 ===
Home \ Away	BOH	COR	DER	DRO	FHA	GAL	SHM	SHE	SLI	StP	UCD	WAT
Bohemians	—	3–0	0–0	2–1	1–0	1–3	0–0	0–1	3–2	0–0	1–0	0–2
Cork City	1–1	—	0–0	3–0	2–0	3–0	2–0	1–2	0–0	1–0	1–0	0–0
Derry City	0–0	1–0	—	0–2	2–0	2–0	0–0	1–0	0–0	0–3	0–2	1–1
Drogheda United	0–2	0–0	1–2	—	0–2	3–1	0–0	0–0	1–1	0–3	0–1	1–0
Finn Harps	0–0	1–1	1–1	0–0	—	1–2	1–0	0–1	2–1	1–1	0–0	4–0
Galway United	0–1	0–2	0–2	1–1	0–4	—	0–2	0–0	5–0	1–0	2–1	0–0
Shamrock Rovers	0–1	1–2	3–0	4–1	3–1	0–0	—	1–1	4–1	2–1	0–0	1–0
Shelbourne	1–0	3–2	2–0	0–0	1–1	1–1	3–0	—	1–0	1–0	0–0	1–0
Sligo Rovers	0–0	0–5	2–0	0–0	1–1	1–0	3–5	0–4	—	0–1	0–1	1–0
St Patrick's Athletic	1–3	2–0	1–1	3–0	1–0	3–0	0–0	1–1	3–2	—	0–0	0–0
UCD	0–2	2–2	1–0	3–0	1–0	0–2	1–1	0–2	1–1	2–1	—	2–1
Waterford United	0–0	1–3	2–2	1–0	1–0	0–0	0–0	0–0	1–0	3–1	0–2	—

Source: www.rsssf.org
Legend: Blue = home team win; Yellow = draw; Red = away team win.

=== Matches 23–33 ===
Home \ Away	BOH	COR	DER	DRO	FHA	GAL	SHM	SHE	SLI	StP	UCD	WAT
Bohemians	—	—	3–0	—	—	—	1–3	1–1	4–1	0–1	1–2	—
Cork City	2–1	—	—	3–1	—	—	—	—	0–1	1–1	1–1	—
Derry City	—	1–4	—	2–1	—	—	1–0	—	1–3	—	2–0	3–1
Drogheda United	0–3	—	—	—	3–2	—	0–4	—	—	1–2	0–5	1–1
Finn Harps	0–1	1–2	1–2	—	—	—	—	2–3	2–1	—	—	—
Galway United	1–2	0–4	3–2	2–2	1–3	—	—	—	—	1–2	—	—
Shamrock Rovers	—	1–3	—	—	3–3	2–1	—	2–1	4–2	—	—	1–2
Shelbourne	—	4–0	2–2	1–0	—	1–1	—	—	—	—	2–1	—
Sligo Rovers	—	—	—	1–1	—	1–1	—	2–4	—	2–2	1–2	—
St Patrick's Athletic	—	—	1–2	—	2–1	—	1–1	1–2	—	—	—	1–0
UCD	—	—	—	—	1–1	1–1	3–0	—	—	2–2	—	2–2
Waterford United	0–2	2–2	—	—	2–3	2–1	—	0–2	1–0	—	—	—

Source: www.rsssf.org
Legend: Blue = home team win; Yellow = draw; Red = away team win.

== Top scorers ==
Rank	Player	Club	Goals
1	(Republic of Ireland) Pat Morley	Cork City	20

== Promotion/relegation play-off ==
As the tenth-placed team in the Premier Division, Waterford United qualified for a play-off against Kilkenny City, the third-placed team from the First Division.

=== 1st leg ===
3 May 2000	Kilkenny City	1–0	Waterford United

=== 2nd leg ===
6 May 2000	Waterford United	0–1	Kilkenny City
		Report	Jordan 90+3'

Kilkenny City won 2–0 on aggregate and were promoted to the Premier Division.

== See also ==
- 1999–2000 League of Ireland First Division
