= 1996–97 League of Ireland Premier Division =

League of Ireland Premier Division
- Season: 1996–97
- Champions: Derry City (2nd title)
- Relegated: Bray Wanderers; Home Farm Everton
- UEFA Champions League: Derry City
- UEFA Cup: Bohemians
- UEFA Cup Winners' Cup: Shelbourne
- UEFA Intertoto Cup: Cork City
- Top goalscorer: Stephen Geoghegan: 16 (Shelbourne); Tony Cousins: 16 (Shamrock Rovers)

The 1996–97 League of Ireland Premier Division was the 12th season of the League of Ireland Premier Division. The division was made up of 12 teams. Derry City F.C. won the title.

== Regular season ==
The season saw each team playing three rounds of games, playing every other team three times, totalling 33 games.

=== Final Table ===
Pos	Team	Pld	W	D	L	GF	GA	GD	Pts	Qualification or relegation
1	Derry City (C)	33	19	10	4	58	27	+31	67	Qualification to Champions League first qualifying round
2	Bohemians	33	16	9	8	43	32	+11	57	Qualification to UEFA Cup first qualifying round
3	Shelbourne	33	15	9	9	52	36	+16	54	Qualification to Cup Winners' Cup qualifying round (Note: Shelbourne qualified for the Cup Winners' Cup qualifying round after winning the 1996–97 FAI Cup final.)
4	Cork City	33	15	9	9	38	24	+14	54	Qualification to Intertoto Cup group stage
5	St Patrick's Athletic	33	13	14	6	45	33	+12	53	
6	Sligo Rovers	33	12	11	10	43	43	0	47	
7	Shamrock Rovers	33	10	13	10	43	46	−3	43	
8	UCD	33	12	7	14	34	39	−5	43	
9	Finn Harps	33	10	9	14	41	43	−2	39	
10	Dundalk (O)	33	9	9	15	32	50	−18	36	Qualification to Relegation play-off
11	Bray Wanderers (R)	33	5	8	20	30	59	−29	23	Relegation to League of Ireland First Division
12	Home Farm Everton (R)	33	3	10	20	26	53	−27	19	Relegation to League of Ireland First Division

Source: www.rsssf.com
(C) Champions; (O) Play-off winners; (R) Relegated

=== Results ===
==== Matches 1–22 ====
Home \ Away	BOH	BRW	COR	DER	DUN	FHA	HOM	SHM	SHE	SLI	StP	UCD
Bohemians	—	1–0	1–0	0–2	0–0	3–1	1–1	1–1	1–1	0–0	0–1	1–0
Bray Wanderers	0–1	—	0–0	2–3	0–1	0–0	1–0	3–4	0–4	2–2	0–1	0–2
Cork City	0–0	3–1	—	0–1	0–0	0–1	0–0	0–1	0–1	1–0	1–1	1–0
Derry City	1–0	5–1	0–1	—	5–2	3–0	1–1	1–0	1–1	0–0	1–1	5–0
Dundalk	0–2	2–1	0–1	0–1	—	1–1	2–1	1–3	0–1	1–1	1–0	2–2
Finn Harps	1–2	0–0	0–1	0–1	0–0	—	3–0	0–0	3–2	1–1	0–1	5–1
Home Farm Everton	0–3	0–1	0–2	0–2	0–0	2–3	—	0–0	0–3	0–0	0–2	0–1
Shamrock Rovers	3–2	2–0	0–1	1–1	0–2	2–2	2–1	—	6–4	2–1	0–1	0–0
Shelbourne	0–1	1–0	3–3	2–2	0–1	1–2	2–0	2–0	—	3–0	0–1	1–0
Sligo Rovers	2–1	0–1	1–4	0–1	2–1	0–2	0–0	1–1	0–3	—	2–0	2–0
St Patrick's Athletic	5–0	2–1	0–0	1–1	2–2	2–0	1–2	0–0	1–1	2–2	—	1–1
UCD	0–2	2–1	2–1	0–1	1–0	0–0	0–0	1–0	1–3	1–1	0–1	—

Legend: Blue = home team win; Yellow = draw; Red = away team win.

==== Matches 23–33 ====
Home \ Away	BOH	BRW	COR	DER	DUN	FHA	HOM	SHM	SHE	SLI	StP	UCD
Bohemians	—	—	1–0	1–1	3–0	—	—	1–3	—	0–2	2–1	—
Bray Wanderers	1–5	—	—	—	1–0	0–1	—	—	1–1	—	—	2–0
Cork City	—	3–1	—	—	—	1–0	2–1	1–1	3–1	1–2	—	—
Derry City	—	5–2	0–2	—	—	—	3–1	1–1	—	0–2	2–0	—
Dundalk	—	—	0–4	2–4	—	—	—	4–1	—	2–1	2–2	—
Finn Harps	3–3	—	—	0–1	5–0	—	3–2	1–2	—	3–4	—	—
Home Farm Everton	2–2	1–1	—	—	0–1	—	—	—	3–0	—	1–3	2–3
Shamrock Rovers	—	2–2	—	—	—	—	2–3	—	—	—	—	1–1
Shelbourne	0–1	—	—	2–2	2–1	2–0	—	2–0	—	—	1–1	1–0
Sligo Rovers	—	3–2	—	—	—	—	3–2	3–0	1–1	—	—	2–1
St Patrick's Athletic	—	2–2	1–1	—	—	2–1	—	2–2	—	4–2	—	—
UCD	1–2	—	3–0	1–0	3–1	4–0	—	—	—	—	2–0	—

Legend: Blue = home team win; Yellow = draw; Red = away team win.

== Promotion/relegation play-off ==
Dundalk F.C. who finished in tenth place played off against Waterford United, the third placed team from the 1996–97 League of Ireland First Division.

=== 1st leg ===
Dundalk F.C.	3–0	Waterford United

=== 2nd leg ===
Waterford United	1–0	Dundalk F.C.

Dundalk F.C. won 3–1 on aggregate and retained their place in the Premier Division.

== See also ==
- 1996–97 League of Ireland First Division
