= Joe McGrath (Irish footballer) =

Irish footballer and manager

Personal information
- Place of birth: Dublin, Ireland
- Position: Striker

Senior career*
Years	Team	Apps	(Gls)
1963–1966	Dundalk	44	(13)
1966	Drumcondra	3	(0)
1966–1968	Limerick	38	(19)
1968–1970	South Coast United	?	(?)
1970–1971	Limerick	13	(3)

International career
1966	Republic of Ireland U23	1	(0)

Managerial career
- 1985–1997: Republic of Ireland U17
- 1990–1991: Kilkenny City
- 1997–1998: New Zealand
- 1998: Bohemians
- 2000–2001: Kilkenny City
- * Club domestic league appearances and goals

Joe McGrath) is an Irish former association football coach who managed the New Zealand national team. McGrath first took charge of the New Zealand side in May 1997. New Zealand won three, drew three and lost six of his 12 games in charge.

He later coached Irish sides Bohemians and Kilkenny City.

During his spell at Oriel Park McGrath won the 1964-65 LFA President's Cup. He moved to Drumcondra in March 1966 making his debut against his former club. He played twice against Eintracht Frankfurt in the 1966–67 Inter-Cities Fairs Cup.

On 5 June 1966 at Dalymount Park McGrath played in the first ever Republic of Ireland U23 game. He was also an amateur international.

In November 1966 McGrath moved to Limerick F.C. and scored twice on his debut on the 20th.

A fully qualified UEFA coach, he took over as Irish Youths team coach in 1985 in succession to Liam Tuohy (footballer) and was later appointed FAI Director of Coaching.

He managed his son Derek McGrath (footballer) during his brief stay at Bohs and again at Kilkenny City. Derek also played for Shamrock Rovers amongst others in the League of Ireland and for the Republic of Ireland national under-19 football team and Republic of Ireland national under-21 football team.
