= 1998–99 League of Ireland Premier Division =

14th season of the League of Ireland Premier Division

League of Ireland Premier Division
- Season: 1998–99
- Champions: St Patrick's Athletic (7th title)
- Relegated: Bray Wanderers; Dundalk F.C.
- UEFA Champions League: St Patrick's Athletic
- UEFA Cup: Cork City; Bray Wanderers
- UEFA Intertoto Cup: Shelbourne
- FAI Super Cup: St Patrick's Athletic; Shelbourne; Cork City; Bray Wanderers
- Top goalscorer: Trevor Molloy: 15 (St. Patrick's Athletic)

The 1998–99 League of Ireland Premier Division was the 14th season of the League of Ireland Premier Division. The division was made up of 12 teams. St Patrick's Athletic F.C. won the title. For sponsorship purposes, it was known as the FAI Harp Lager National League.

== Regular season ==
The season saw each team playing three rounds of games, playing every other team three times, totalling 33 games.

=== Final Table ===
Pos	Team	Pld	W	D	L	GF	GA	GD	Pts	Qualification or relegation
1	St Patrick's Athletic (C)	33	22	7	4	58	21	+37	73	Qualification to Champions League first qualifying round
2	Cork City	33	21	7	5	62	25	+37	70	Qualification to UEFA Cup qualifying round
3	Shelbourne	33	13	8	12	37	35	+2	47	Qualification to Intertoto Cup first round
4	Finn Harps	33	12	10	11	39	40	−1	46	
5	Derry City	33	12	9	12	34	32	+2	45	
6	UCD	33	10	12	11	31	32	−1	42	
7	Waterford United	33	11	9	13	21	37	−16	42	
8	Shamrock Rovers	33	9	13	11	34	40	−6	40	
9	Sligo Rovers	33	9	11	13	37	50	−13	38	
10	Bohemians (O)	33	10	7	16	28	37	−9	37	Qualification to Relegation play-off
11	Bray Wanderers (R)	33	8	8	17	30	45	−15	32	Relegation to League of Ireland First Division and qualification to UEFA Cup qualifying round (Note: Bray Wanderers qualified for the UEFA Cup qualifying round after winning the 1999 FAI Cup Final.)
12	Dundalk (R)	33	6	9	18	23	40	−17	27	Relegation to League of Ireland First Division

Source: www.rsssf.com
(C) Champions; (O) Play-off winners; (R) Relegated

=== Results ===
==== Matches 1–22 ====
Home \ Away	BOH	BRW	COR	DER	DUN	FHA	SHM	SHE	SLI	StP	UCD	WAT
Bohemians	—	1–2	0–2	0–1	1–0	2–3	1–1	2–0	0–1	1–1	3–0	0–1
Bray Wanderers	0–1	—	0–1	0–1	0–0	0–0	3–4	1–0	1–1	1–4	0–0	6–0
Cork City	0–0	3–0	—	2–1	4–1	2–0	3–1	2–1	1–0	1–2	1–2	5–0
Derry City	0–2	5–1	1–1	—	0–1	2–1	1–1	0–1	2–0	0–1	2–0	1–0
Dundalk	0–1	0–1	1–1	2–2	—	0–0	1–1	1–2	0–2	2–0	2–0	2–0
Finn Harps	1–0	6–2	1–1	2–2	0–0	—	2–1	3–2	1–1	2–1	0–0	1–2
Shamrock Rovers	3–0	0–1	0–3	0–0	1–1	2–0	—	2–1	1–1	2–1	2–0	0–0
Shelbourne	2–1	1–0	3–3	2–0	1–2	0–0	2–2	—	1–1	0–1	1–1	1–0
Sligo Rovers	2–2	0–0	0–2	3–3	2–0	1–1	2–3	1–3	—	1–4	0–1	1–1
St Patrick's Athletic	3–0	3–0	2–0	1–0	3–1	2–2	3–0	2–1	4–1	—	1–0	2–0
UCD	2–0	3–1	0–1	2–2	0–0	3–0	0–2	1–1	2–0	2–2	—	1–1
Waterford United	0–0	1–0	0–2	1–2	1–0	0–3	1–1	0–0	1–1	0–2	1–0	—

Source: www.rsssf.com
Legend: Blue = home team win; Yellow = draw; Red = away team win.

==== Matches 23–33 ====
Home \ Away	BOH	BRW	COR	DER	DUN	FHA	SHM	SHE	SLI	StP	UCD	WAT
Bohemians	—	0–0	0–2	—	2–1	0–1	—	—	—	—	—	0–1
Bray Wanderers	—	—	1–3	—	1–0	—	—	0–1	1–2	—	—	0–1
Cork City	—	—	—	0–1	2–0	2–1	3–0	2–1	—	—	—	0–0
Derry City	0–1	1–1	—	—	—	1–0	—	1–0	—	0–0	—	—
Dundalk	—	—	—	0–1	—	—	1–1	1–2	3–2	—	0–2	—
Finn Harps	—	0–3	—	—	1–0	—	4–1	—	—	0–3	1–0	2–0
Shamrock Rovers	1–1	0–0	—	1–0	—	—	—	—	—	0–1	0–0	—
Shelbourne	1–2	—	—	—	—	2–0	1–0	—	1–0	1–1	—	0–2
Sligo Rovers	2–1	—	2–5	2–0	—	2–0	1–0	—	—	—	—	2–1
St Patrick's Athletic	1–3	1–0	1–0	—	1–0	—	—	—	4–0	—	0–0	—
UCD	2–0	1–3	2–2	2–1	—	—	—	0–1	0–0	—	—	—
Waterford United	—	—	—	1–0	2–0	—	1–0	—	—	0–0	1–2	—

Source: www.rsssf.com
Legend: Blue = home team win; Yellow = draw; Red = away team win.

== Promotion/relegation play-off ==
Bohemians who finished in tenth place played off against Cobh Ramblers, the third placed team from the 1998–99 League of Ireland First Division.

1st Leg

5 May 1999	Cobh Ramblers	0–5	Bohemians

2nd Leg

8 May 1999	Bohemians	2–0	Cobh Ramblers

Bohemians won 7–0 on aggregate and retained their place in the Premier Division.

== See also ==
- 1998–99 League of Ireland First Division
