= FAI Super Cup =

- Organiser(s): Football Association of Ireland
- Founded: 1998
- Abolished: 2001
- Region: Republic of Ireland
- Teams: 4
- Most championships: Shamrock Rovers (1); St Patrick's Athletic (1); UCD (1); Shelbourne (1)

The FAI Super Cup was an association football super cup featuring clubs from the Republic of Ireland. It was played for between 1998 and 2001. It was a pre-season tournament played in the summer before the regular League of Ireland season began. The same four clubs that qualified to represent the Republic of Ireland in UEFA competitions also qualified for the Super Cup. League of Ireland clubs had previously played in a similar competition known as the Top Four Cup. A similar competition, the LFA President's Cup, co-existed with the FAI Super Cup. Since 2014 the FAI has organised a new super cup, the President's Cup.

== Format ==
The first three tournaments were played as a single-elimination tournament, featuring two semi-finals, a third place play-off and a final. The 2001 tournament featured a single round robin group with the group winners being awarded the cup.

== History ==
In 1998 the FAI announce their plans to establish a super cup. It was to be played during the summer and it was intended to act as a warm up and provide the clubs involved in Europe with some competitive games. However the UEFA Intertoto Cup representatives had already played their tie before the FAI Super Cup kicked off. Shamrock Rovers, St Patrick's Athletic, UCD and Shelbourne all won one tournament each.

== List of participants ==
Year	Winners	Runners up	3rd Place	4th place
1998–99	Shamrock Rovers	St Patrick's Athletic	Cork City	Shelbourne
1999–2000	St Patrick's Athletic	Shelbourne	Bray Wanderers	Cork City
2000–01	UCD	Bohemians	Cork City	Shelbourne
2001–02	Shelbourne	Bohemians	Cork City	Longford Town

== Tournaments ==
=== 1998 FAI Super Cup ===
Semi-finals

1 July 1998	Shamrock Rovers	2–1	Cork City	Morton Stadium
	Kenny 51'; Stokes 55'		Kabia 78' (pen.)	Referee: Paul McKeon

2 July 1998	Shelbourne	0–0 (4–5 p)	St Patrick's Athletic	Morton Stadium
		[ Report]		Referee: Hugh Byrne

3rd Place Playoff

5 July 1998	Shelbourne	1–1 (1–4 p)	Cork City	Tolka Park
	Baker 44'		Kabia 17'	Referee: Eddie Barr

Final

5 July 1998	Shamrock Rovers	2–0	St Patrick's Athletic	Tolka Park
	Woods 11'; Morrisroe 89'			Referee: John McDermott

=== 1999 FAI Super Cup ===
Semi-finals

1 July 1999	Cork City	0–2	St Patrick's Athletic	Turners Cross
19:30		Report	Molloy 18', 76' (pen.)	Referee: Dick O'Hanlon

1 July 1999	Shelbourne	2–0	Bray Wanderers	Tolka Park
19:30	Haylock 12'; Ogden 70'	Report		Referee: John McDermott

3rd Place Playoff

3 July 1999	Cork City	1–2	Bray Wanderers	Turners Cross
	Barry-Murphy 0'		J. Byrne 0'; Tresson 0'

Final

4 July 1999	St Patrick's Athletic	0–0 (3–2 p)	Shelbourne	Richmond Park
				Referee: Gerard Perry

=== 2000 FAI Super Cup ===
Semi-finals

30 June 2000	Cork City	2–2 (4–5 p)	Bohemians	Turners Cross
	Gamble 47'; Delaney 83'	Report	Daly 8' (o.g.); Crowe 70' (pen.)

30 June 2000	UCD	2–0	Shelbourne	Belfield Park
	McLoughlin 27'; Lynch 90+2'	Report

3rd Place Playoff

2 July 2000	Shelbourne	0–2	Cork City	Belfield Park
			Tynan 3'; Hartigan 9'

Final

2 July 2000	UCD	2–2 (5–4 p)	Bohemians	Tolka Park
15:00	Mooney 11'; Mullen 19' (o.g.)	Report	O'Driscoll 16'; Brennan 60'	Referee: John McDermott

=== 2001 FAI Super Cup ===
==== Standings ====
Pos	Team	Pld	W	D	L	GF	GA	GD	Pts	Qualification or relegation
1	Shelbourne	3	1	2	0	4	2	+2	5	2001 FAI Super Cup Champions
2	Bohemians	3	0	3	0	3	3	0	3	
3	Cork City	3	0	3	0	2	2	0	3	
4	Longford Town	3	0	2	1	3	5	−2	2	

Updated to match(es) played on 1 July 2001. Source:

==== Matches ====
27 June 2001	Longford Town	1–1	Cork City	Longford Rugby Club
19:30	Alan Reynolds 24'		James Mulligan 90'

27 June 2001	Bohemians	1–1	Shelbourne	Dalymount Park
19:45	Brian Shelley 36'		Trevor Fitzpatrick 88'

29 June 2001	Cork City	0–0	Bohemians	Knockgriffin Park
18:45

29 June 2001	Shelbourne	2–0	Longford Town	Tolka Park
19:45	Garry Haylock 7'; Pat Fenlon 55'

1 July 2001	Shelbourne	1–1	Cork City	Tolka Park
15:00	Richie Foran 88'	Report	Anthony Buckley 85'	Referee: Paul McKeon

1 July 2001	Longford Town	2–2	Bohemians	Longford Rugby Club
17:00	Keith O'Connor 11', 39'	Report	Darren Meade 18'; Alex Nesovic 40'	Referee: Ian Stokes
