= Patrick McEleney =

Irish professional footballer (born 1992)

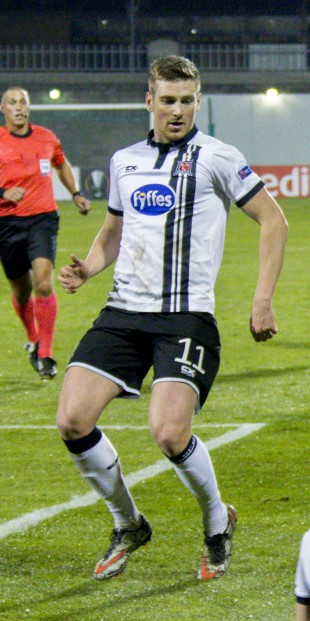
- McEleney playing against Zenit Saint Petersburg in the 2016–17 Europa League

Personal information
- Full name: Patrick McEleney
- Date of birth: 26 September 1992 (age 34)
- Place of birth: Derry, Northern Ireland
- Position: Midfielder

Team information
- Current team: Finn Harps (interim manager)

Youth career
- –2008: Foyle Harps
- 2008–2009: Sunderland

Senior career*
Years	Team	Apps	(Gls)
2010–2015	Derry City	175	(26)
2016–2017	Dundalk	49	(13)
2018	Oldham Athletic	9	(1)
2018–2021	Dundalk	64	(5)
2022–2024	Derry City	60	(2)
2025–2026	Ballymena United	25	(3)

International career^{‡}
2008	Northern Ireland U16		
2008–2009	Republic of Ireland U17	7	(1)
2009–2010	Republic of Ireland U19	4	(0)

Managerial career
- 2026–: Finn Harps (interim)
- * Club domestic league appearances and goals as of 29 July 2026 ‡ National team caps and goals as of 10 September 2012

Patrick McEleney (born 26 September 1992) is an Irish former professional footballer and current interim manager of League of Ireland First Division side Finn Harps. During his career he played for Sunderland, Derry City (over two spells), Oldham Athletic, Dundalk (over two spells) and Ballymena United.

== Club career ==
=== Sunderland ===
McEleney joined Sunderland from Foyle Harps on a scholarship in the summer of 2008. He signed a 2 1/2-year professional contract with the club in September 2008 and formed part of the under-18 and reserves teams which won their respective leagues that season under Kevin Ball. Both he and Everton youth team prospect, Shane Duffy, were granted a Civic Reception by the Mayor of Derry, Colr. Gerard Diver in the Guildhall in April 2009 to acknowledge their swift rise to prominence at their clubs. However, his time at the Stadium of Light was cut short as the player struggled with homesickness and the club agreed to release him from his contract.

=== Derry City ===
McEleney was one of the first four players signed by Stephen Kenny for Derry City following their relegation to the League of Ireland First Division, penning a two-year deal in December 2009. He was a key member of the Derry side that won the 2010 First Division title, scoring 12 league goals in 31 appearances, and he attracted interest from some English Premier League clubs and Celtic due to his performances. McEleney was nominated for the 2010 PFAI First Division Player of the Year award, ultimately losing out to Graham Cummins. McEleney was involved in a controversial incident in October 2010 when, 3 days after pulling out of the Republic of Ireland's Under 19 squad due to an ankle injury, he played and scored twice in a First Division fixture against Shelbourne. The League of Ireland Participation Agreement stated that if a player was not released for international duty, he could not play for his club during the five days after that duty. The FAI cleared Derry of any breach, however, declaring that "by the time [McEleney] had recovered from the injury, he was no longer required to fulfil his international duties and so he was eligible to play for Derry City."

In 2011, McEleney made a further 34 league appearances as Derry finished third on their return to the Premier Division. He also won the League Cup as Derry beat Cork 1–0 in the final at Turner's Cross. In May 2012, McEleney scored a penalty in the final of the Setanta Sports Cup against Crusaders, however Derry ultimately lost in the shootout. Later in the year he was a member of the team who won the FAI Cup on 4 November 2012, playing 59 minutes in their 3–2 defeat of St. Patrick's Athletic in the final.

McEleney featured in the UEFA Europa League with Derry City on a number of occasions. He played against Trabzonspor in the second qualifying round in 2013, and the following year he scored in Derry's 4–0 win over Aberystwyth Town in the first qualifying round. He also subsequently played against Shakhtyor Soligorsk in the second qualifying round. McEleney shone as Derry City reached the 2014 FAI Cup Final, however on this occasion they lost to St. Patrick's Athletic. He made his 200th appearance in all competitions for Derry in a 4–2 loss against Bohemians on 24 July 2015. At the end of 2015, McEleney was unable to agree a new deal with Derry and his contract expired.

=== Dundalk ===
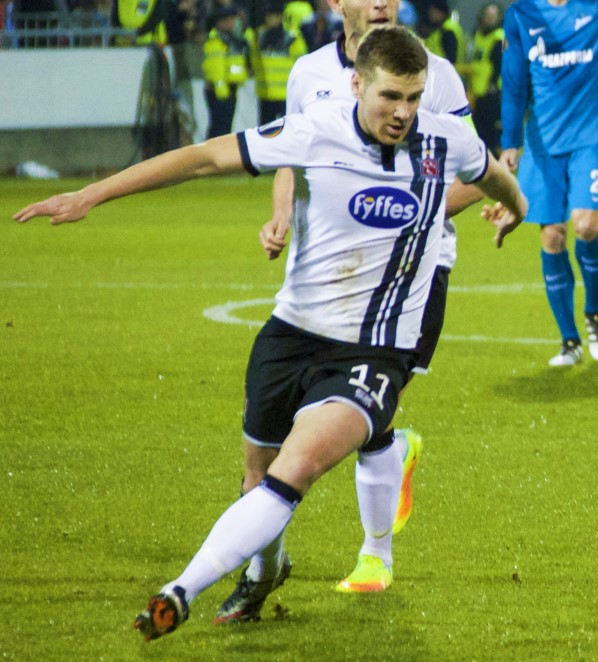
McEleney in action against Zenit Saint Petersburg in the 2016–17 Europa League.

Despite interest from Peterborough United, Brentford and St. Patrick's Athletic, McEleney signed a two-year deal with Dundalk in December 2015, linking up again with his former boss Stephen Kenny. He was primarily signed as a replacement for the departed Richie Towell who moved to Brighton and Hove Albion. Due to the fact that McEleney was under the age of 24 at the time, Dundalk had to pay a fee of €28,000 to Derry in compensation, a fee equal to one year of the player's gross salary. McEleney marked his home debut with a goal during a 3–0 defeat of Finn Harps. He picked up a groin injury after just his fourth game for the club and a hamstring injury sustained during his comeback put him out for longer, with McEleney noting that it took him until the mid-season break to gain full fitness. Following this, McEleney appeared in all six of Dundalk's UEFA Champions League qualifying ties, playing a particularly crucial role in the 3–0 defeat of BATE Borisov in the third qualifying round second leg after coming off the bench for the injured Ronan Finn and helping Dundalk qualify for the Europa League group stage. In the 2020 Europa League third qualifying round, he scored in the penalty shoot-out against Sheriff Tiraspol helping Dundalk qualify for the 2020–21 UEFA Europa League group stage. In the 2021-22 Europa Conference League 3rd round Qualifiers, He scored 2 goals to draw the game against Vitesse Arnhem.

=== Return to Derry City ===
It was announced on 8 July 2021 that McEleney had signed a pre-contract to re-join his hometown club Derry City on a two-year contract, commencing at the end of the season. On 13 November 2022 McEleney helped Derry to win the 2022 FAI Cup Final.

=== Ballymena United ===
On 15 November 2024, McEleny signed for NIFL Premiership club Ballymena United, with the move set to be completed on 1 January 2025 upon the opening of the transfer window. On 26 July 2026, McEleney announced his retirement from professional football after making 30 appearances for the club in his 18 months there.

== International career ==
McEleney played for the Northern Ireland Under-16 team before later representing the Republic of Ireland at youth level. He represented the Republic of Ireland at Under-17 level seven times and scored on his debut against Bulgaria in a 2–0 win at the Ovcha Kupel Stadium in August 2008. McEleney progressed to the Republic of Ireland Under-19 team in September 2009, making his debut against the Netherlands at the Carlisle Grounds in the Clarion Hotel Four-nation Tour. He went on to make a further 3 appearances for the Under-19s. Despite being contacted by Northern Ireland manager Michael O'Neill with a view to being called up to their senior squad, McEleney has indicated that his international future lies with the Republic of Ireland.

== Coaching career ==
On 29 July 2026, McEleney was named as interim manager of League of Ireland First Division club Finn Harps until the end of the season, with his brother Shane appointed as his interim assistant manager.

== Personal life ==
McEleney is from the Shantallow area of Derry city. His father, Henry, was also a footballer, playing for Coleraine in the Irish League. Furthermore, McEleney's older brother, Shane, is a centre back and teammate of Patrick's at Derry City, having previously played for Finn Harps, Larne, Ottawa Fury & St Patrick's Athletic. Like Patrick, Shane has featured at youth level for the Republic of Ireland and recently switched allegiance to Northern Ireland, playing and scoring for the under-21 team in August 2012 against Hungary.

McEleney was a ballboy at Derry City in his youth. In 2015, an Italian football fan travelled 5,000 km to watch Derry City play and obtain McEleney's autograph after managing the club in PC videogame Football Manager.

== Career statistics ==
=== Playing statistics ===
As of match played 7 April 2026

Appearances and goals by club, season and competition
Club	Season	League			National Cup		League Cup		Europe		Other		Total	
Club	Season	Division	Apps	Goals	Apps	Goals	Apps	Goals	Apps	Goals	Apps	Goals	Apps	Goals
Derry City	2010	LOI First Division	31	11	2	1	3	1	–		–		36	13
Derry City	2011	LOI Premier Division	34	5	1	0	3	0	–		–		38	5
Derry City	2012	LOI Premier Division	27	3	6	1	2	1	–		7 (Note: Appearances in Setanta Sports Cup)	2	42	7
Derry City	2013	LOI Premier Division	28	3	2	0	3	0	2 (Note: Appearances in UEFA Europa League)	0	2	0	37	3
Derry City	2014	LOI Premier Division	27	5	7	2	1	1	4	1	–		39	9
Derry City	2015	LOI Premier Division	28	1	4	1	1	0	–		–		33	2
Derry City	Total		175	28	22	5	13	3	6	1	9	2	225	39
Dundalk	2016	LOI Premier Division	23	3	3	0	0	0	12 (Note: 6 appearances in UEFA Champions League, 6 appearances in UEFA Europa League)	0	2 (Note: 1 appearance & 1 goal in Leinster Senior Cup, 1 appearance in President of Ireland's Cup)	1	40	4
Dundalk	2017	LOI Premier Division	26	10	3	0	2	1	2 (Note: Appearances in UEFA Champions League)	0	2 (Note: 1 appearance & 1 goal in Leinster Senior Cup, 1 appearance in President of Ireland's Cup)	1	35	12
Dundalk	Total		49	13	6	0	2	1	14	0	4	2	75	16
Oldham Athletic	2017–18	EFL League One	9	1	0	0	0	0	–		0	0	9	1
Dundalk	2018	LOI Premier Division	11	1	4	2	0	0	2	0	1 (Note: Appearance in Leinster Senior Cup)	0	18	3
Dundalk	2019	LOI Premier Division	24	2	4	0	2	1	6 (Note: 4 appearances in UEFA Champions League, 2 appearances in UEFA Europa League)	0	1 (Note: Appearance in President of Ireland's Cup)	0	37	3
Dundalk	2020	LOI Premier Division	9	0	4	1	–		8 (Note: 1 appearance in UEFA Champions League, 7 appearances in UEFA Europa League)	0	–		20	1
Dundalk	2021	LOI Premier Division	20	2	1	1	–		6 (Note: Appearances in UEFA Europa Conference League)	2	1	0	28	5
Dundalk	Total		64	5	13	4	2	1	22	2	3	0	103	12
Derry City	2022	LOI Premier Division	27	1	5	0	–		2	0	–		34	1
Derry City	2023	LOI Premier Division	20	1	2	0	–		6	0	0	0	28	1
Derry City	2024	LOI Premier Division	13	0	3	0	–		0 (Note: Appearances in UEFA Conference League)	0	–		16	0
Derry City	Total		60	2	10	0	–		8	0	0	0	78	2
Ballymena United	2024–25	NIFL Premiership	13	3	1	0	1	0	–		–		15	3
Ballymena United	2025–26	NIFL Premiership	12	0	1	0	1	0	–		1 (Note: Appearances in the County Antrim Shield)	0	15	0
Ballymena United	Total		25	3	2	0	2	0	–		1	0	30	3
Career total			383	50	47	6	16	4	50	3	16	4	518	71

=== Managerial statistics ===
As of match played on 16 October 2026

Managerial record by team and tenure
Team	From	To	Record							
Team	From	To	G	W	D	L	GF	GA	GD	Win %
Finn Harps (interim)	29 July 2026	Present	12	2	0	10	12	30	−18	16.67
Total			12	2	0	10	12	30	−18	16.67

== Honours ==
=== Club ===
Derry City

- League of Ireland First Division (1): 2010
- League of Ireland Cup (1): 2011
- FAI Cup (2): 2012, 2022
- President of Ireland's Cup (1): 2023

Dundalk

- League of Ireland Premier Division (3): 2016, 2018, 2019
- FAI Cup (2): 2018, 2020
- League of Ireland Cup (2): 2017, 2019
- President of Ireland's Cup (2): 2019, 2021
- Champions Cup (1): 2019

=== Individual ===
- PFAI Premier Division Team of the Year: 2016
