= 2001 FAI Cup final =

- Event: 2000-01 FAI Cup
| Bohemians | Longford Town |
| 1 | 0 |
- Date: 13 May 2001
- Venue: Tolka Park, Dublin
- Referee: H. Byrne

The 2001 FAI Cup final was the deciding match of the 2000-01 FAI Cup, the national association football cup of Ireland. Bohemians, who had just won the domestic league, and Longford Town contested the final. Bohemians won the match 1–0

O' Connor scored the only goal of the game in the 61st minute.
