= Liquidation in Ireland =

Liquidation is the process by which companies are wound-up, bringing their life to an end. The liquidator is the person appointed to supervise and implement the company's winding up.

The liquidation process in Ireland is governed by the Companies Act 2014 (as amended), which came into operation in June 2015 and made significant changes to the way liquidations are supervised and who can be appointed as liquidator.

The Companies Acts provide for three different types of liquidation, details of which are below:

== Members Voluntary Liquidation (MVL) ==
An MVL is the process of winding up a company that has sufficient assets to repay all of its creditors within one year of the liquidator's appointment.

In an MVL the liquidator is appointed by and reports to the company's members / shareholders. After the company's creditors have been repaid in full the liquidator distributes the balance of the company's assets to the company's members / shareholders.

== Creditors Voluntary Liquidation (CVL) ==
A CVL is the process of winding up a company that does not have sufficient assets to repay all of its creditors within one year of the liquidator's appointment.

In a CVL the liquidator is appointed by the company's creditors at a meeting convened by the company's directors for that purpose. The liquidator must call periodic meetings of creditors whilst the liquidation is ongoing and is accountable to the creditors.

It is unusual in a CVL for the company to have sufficient assets to repay all of its creditors. The liquidator realises the value of the company's assets and applies the proceeds in repayment of the company's creditors in order of their preference. Certain creditors have preferential status (e.g. secured creditors, tax creditors, & employees) and must be repaid in full to the extent that the company's assets permit them to be. The balance available, if any, after the preferential creditors are repaid is available to repay the non-preferential creditors. The balance available, if any, after the non-preferential creditors are repaid is distributed amongst the company's shareholders.

== Compulsory / Official Liquidation ==
A compulsory / official liquidation occurs when the High Court orders that a company be wound up, which most frequently occurs following a petition by one of the company's creditors. Where a liquidator is appointed by the court he is known as the "Official Liquidator". The Official Liquidator reports to an official of the High Court known as the Examiner, and may be required to account directly to the court for his actions.

An Official Liquidator deals with the company's assets in the same way as a liquidator appointed in a CVL.
