= 1996–97 League of Ireland First Division =

League of Ireland First Division
- Season: 1996–97
- Champions: Kilkenny City
- Promoted: Drogheda United
- Top goalscorer: Richie Hale: 13 (Kilkenny City); Tony Izzi: 13 (Cobh Ramblers)

The 1996–97 League of Ireland First Division season was the 12th season of the League of Ireland First Division.

== Overview ==
The First Division was contested by 10 teams and Kilkenny City won the division.

== Final table ==
Pos	Team	Pld	W	D	L	GF	GA	GD	Pts	Promotion or qualification
1	Kilkenny City A.F.C.	27	15	10	2	47	20	+27	55	Promoted to Premier Division
2	Drogheda United F.C.	27	12	8	7	44	27	+17	44	Promoted to Premier Division
3	Waterford United F.C.	27	12	8	7	41	28	+13	44	Lost promotion/relegation play-off
4	Athlone Town A.F.C.	27	10	7	10	40	39	+1	37	
5	Cobh Ramblers F.C.	27	9	8	10	34	28	+6	35	
6	Galway United F.C.	27	9	8	10	33	38	−5	35	
7	Longford Town F.C.	27	7	13	7	31	38	−7	34	
8	Monaghan United F.C.	27	7	9	11	30	46	−16	30	
9	St Francis F.C. (Note: St Francis F.C. replaced St James's Gate F.C. before the season started. The latter were expelled from the league as they were unable to meet financial guarantees.)	27	7	7	13	29	33	−4	28	
10	Limerick F.C.	27	4	8	15	23	55	−32	20	

== Promotion/relegation play-off ==
Third placed Waterford United played off against Dundalk F.C. who finished in tenth place in the 1996–97 League of Ireland Premier Division. The winner would compete in the 1997–98 League of Ireland Premier Division.

=== 1st leg ===
Dundalk F.C.	3–0	Waterford United

=== 2nd leg ===
Waterford United	1–0	Dundalk F.C.

Dundalk F.C. won 3–1 on aggregate and retained their place in the Premier Division.

== See also ==
- 1996–97 League of Ireland Premier Division
