= 1999–2000 League of Ireland First Division =

Annual soccer tournament

League of Ireland First Division
- Season: 1999–2000
- Champions: Bray Wanderers
- Promoted: Longford Town; Kilkenny City
- Top goalscorer: Robbie Farrell: 17 (Home Farm Fingal); Andrew Myler: 17 (Monaghan United); Keith O'Connor: 17 (Longford Town)

The 1999–2000 League of Ireland First Division season was the 15th season of the League of Ireland First Division.

== Overview ==
The First Division was contested by 10 teams and Bray Wanderers A.F.C. won the division.

== Final table ==
Pos	Team	Pld	W	D	L	GF	GA	GD	Pts	Promotion
1	Bray Wanderers A.F.C.	36	21	9	6	69	38	+31	72	Promoted to Premier Division
2	Longford Town F.C.	36	21	7	8	71	40	+31	70	Promoted to Premier Division
3	Kilkenny City A.F.C.	36	20	7	9	65	34	+31	67 (Note: The match between Cobh Ramblers and Kilkenny City on 23 October 1999 was abandoned after 40 minutes due to floodlight failure. The match was replayed on 1 December 1999 with Kilkenny winning 3–2.) (Note: The 3–2 result of the match between Kilkenny City and Limerick F.C. on 12 November 1999 was annulled and Kilkenny City docked three points because they fielded an ineligible player. Following arbitration, the match was replayed on 20 April 2000 with Kilkenny winning 1–0. However the decision to have the match replayed was challenged in the High Court. The judge found the "ineligible player" was not ineligible as per his interpretation of player registration rules. As a result, the 3–2 score from the original match was reinstated.)	Promoted to Premier Division after play-off
4	Dundalk F.C.	36	20	6	10	50	31	+19	66	
5	Cobh Ramblers F.C.	36	15	7	14	50	57	−7	52	
6	Athlone Town A.F.C.	36	8	14	14	31	42	−11	38	
7	Home Farm Fingal F.C.	36	8	11	17	43	60	−17	35	
8	Fingal–St. Francis F.C. (Note: St Francis F.C. changed their club name to Fingal–St. Francis F.C. at the start of the season.)	36	6	14	16	27	54	−27	32	
9	Monaghan United F.C.	36	6	12	18	46	73	−27	30	
10	Limerick F.C.	36	6	11	19	35	58	−23	29	

== Promotion/relegation play-off ==
Third placed Kilkenny City played off against Waterford United who finished in tenth place in the 1999–2000 League of Ireland Premier Division. The winner would compete in the 2000–01 League of Ireland Premier Division.

=== 1st leg ===
3 May 2000	Kilkenny City	1–0	Waterford United

=== 2nd leg ===
6 May 2000	Waterford United	0–1	Kilkenny City

Kilkenny City won 2–0 on aggregate and were promoted to the Premier Division.

== See also ==
- 1999–2000 League of Ireland Premier Division
