= 1997–98 League of Ireland Premier Division =

League of Ireland Premier Division
- Season: 1997–98
- Champions: St Patrick's Athletic (6th title)
- Relegated: Kilkenny City; Drogheda United
- UEFA Champions League: St Patrick's Athletic
- UEFA Cup: Shelbourne
- UEFA Cup Winners' Cup: Cork City
- UEFA Intertoto Cup: Shamrock Rovers
- FAI Super Cup: St Patrick's Athletic; Shelbourne
- LFA President's Cup: St Patrick's Athletic; Shelbourne; Cork City; Shamrock Rovers
- Top goalscorer: Stephen Geoghegan: 17 (Shelbourne)

The 1997–98 League of Ireland Premier Division was the 13th season of the League of Ireland Premier Division. The division was made up of 12 teams. St Patrick's Athletic F.C. won the title.

== Regular season ==
The season saw each team playing three rounds of games, playing every other team three times, totalling 33 games.

=== Final Table ===
Pos	Team	Pld	W	D	L	GF	GA	GD	Pts	Qualification or relegation
1	St Patrick's Athletic (C)	33	19	11	3	46	24	+22	68	Qualification to Champions League first qualifying round
2	Shelbourne	33	20	7	6	58	32	+26	67	Qualification to UEFA Cup first qualifying round
3	Cork City	33	14	11	8	50	40	+10	53	Qualification to Cup Winners' Cup qualifying round (Note: Cork City qualified for the Cup Winners' Cup qualifying round after winning the 1997–98 FAI Cup final.)
4	Shamrock Rovers	33	14	10	9	41	32	+9	52	Qualification to Intertoto Cup first round
5	Bohemians	33	13	11	9	50	36	+14	50	
6	Dundalk	33	12	9	12	41	43	−2	45	
7	Sligo Rovers	33	10	14	9	46	49	−3	44	
8	Finn Harps	33	12	7	14	41	43	−2	43	
9	Derry City	33	10	10	13	30	31	−1	40	
10	UCD (O)	33	9	12	12	36	38	−2	39	Qualification to Relegation play-off
11	Kilkenny City (R)	33	4	7	22	27	63	−36	19	Relegation to League of Ireland First Division
12	Drogheda United (R)	33	2	9	22	20	55	−35	15	Relegation to League of Ireland First Division

Source: www.rsssf.com
(C) Champions; (O) Play-off winners; (R) Relegated

=== Results ===
==== Matches 1–22 ====
Home \ Away	BOH	COR	DER	DRO	DUN	FHA	KLC	SHM	SHE	SLI	StP	UCD
Bohemians	—	4–2	1–0	1–1	2–0	1–0	4–3	0–1	0–1	1–1	0–0	0–0
Cork City	1–1	—	0–1	1–1	0–0	3–1	1–0	2–1	4–4	1–1	0–1	1–0
Derry City	1–0	1–1	—	3–0	0–0	0–0	1–1	0–1	1–2	0–0	1–1	0–3
Drogheda United	0–1	1–2	0–1	—	1–0	0–2	0–0	0–1	0–1	2–4	1–2	0–0
Dundalk	2–2	1–0	0–1	0–2	—	2–0	1–0	0–0	0–1	5–0	0–0	1–2
Finn Harps	3–2	1–2	1–0	1–0	0–1	—	2–1	2–1	0–0	1–1	0–2	1–0
Kilkenny City	1–1	0–2	0–5	2–1	1–2	2–2	—	1–1	1–3	0–1	0–2	1–1
Shamrock Rovers	2–1	1–3	1–0	0–0	1–2	2–1	1–0	—	0–2	0–0	0–1	2–0
Shelbourne	0–1	1–1	1–0	1–0	2–0	3–2	2–1	1–1	—	2–0	0–2	3–1
Sligo Rovers	2–1	0–2	1–1	2–1	3–0	0–2	2–0	0–1	1–1	—	1–1	2–1
St Patrick's Athletic	0–0	3–3	0–0	2–0	1–0	1–0	1–0	2–0	0–0	1–2	—	1–0
UCD	2–1	0–0	1–2	1–1	1–1	0–0	1–0	0–0	2–1	1–1	1–1	—

Legend: Blue = home team win; Yellow = draw; Red = away team win.

==== Matches 23–33 ====
Home \ Away	BOH	COR	DER	DRO	DUN	FHA	KLC	SHM	SHE	SLI	StP	UCD
Bohemians	—	—	—	2–1	—	4–2	8–1	1–1	1–0	—	—	2–0
Cork City	2–0	—	2–0	—	3–0	—	—	—	—	—	1–1	1–2
Derry City	1–0	—	—	4–1	1–2	1–0	—	—	2–2	—	—	1–1
Drogheda United	—	1–2	—	—	—	—	1–1	1–3	–	1–1	1–3	—
Dundalk	3–3	—	—	1–1	—	2–1	3–0	—	2–1	—	—	—
Finn Harps	—	2–1	—	2–0	—	—	—	—	3–1	—	1–2	1–2
Kilkenny City	—	1–2	1–0	—	—	2–3	—	1–2	—	2–1	1–2	—
Shamrock Rovers	—	2–2	3–0	—	5–2	2–2	—	—	—	1–1	0–1	—
Shelbourne	—	3–1	—	5–0	—	—	3–0	2–1	—	3–0	—	—
Sligo Rovers	2–2	4–1	3–0	—	3–3	2–2	—	—	—	—	3–4	—
St Patrick's Athletic	0–2	—	1–0	—	4–2	—	—	—	2–3	—	—	1–1
UCD	—	—	—	3–0	1–3	—	1–2	0–3	2–3	5–1	—	—

Legend: Blue = home team win; Yellow = draw; Red = away team win.

== Promotion/relegation play-off ==
University College Dublin A.F.C. who finished in tenth place played off against Limerick F.C., the third placed team from the 1997–98 League of Ireland First Division.

=== 1st leg ===
5 May 1998	UCD	2–1	Limerick F.C.

=== 2nd leg ===
8 May 1998	Limerick F.C.	1–3	UCD

UCD won 5–2 on aggregate and retained their place in the Premier Division.

== See also ==
- 1997–98 League of Ireland First Division
