= 2017 League of Ireland Cup =

EA Sports Cup

Tournament details
- Country: Ireland
- Dates: March – September
- Teams: 24

Final positions
- Champions: Dundalk
- Runners-up: Shamrock Rovers

Tournament statistics
- Matches played: 23
- Top goal scorer(s): David O'Sullivan (Longford Town) 3 Goals

The 2017 League of Ireland Cup, known for sponsorship reasons as the 2017 EA Sports Cup, was the 44th season of the League of Ireland's secondary knockout competition. The EA Sports Cup features teams from the SSE Airtricity League Premier and First Divisions, as well as some intermediate level teams.

== Teams ==
| Pool 1 | Pool 2 | Pool 3 | Pool 4 |
|---|---|---|---|
| Cobh Ramblers; Cork City *; Limerick *; Avondale United; Waterford; Wexford | Cockhill Celtic; Derry City *; Finn Harps; Galway United; Mayo League; Sligo Rovers * | Bluebell United; Bray Wanderers; Drogheda United; Dundalk *; St Patrick's Athletic; UCD * | Athlone Town; Bohemians; Cabinteely; Longford Town; Shamrock Rovers *; Shelbourne * |

Clubs denoted with * received a bye into Second Round

== First round ==
The draw for the First Round took place on 17 February 2017. Ties were scheduled to take place on 21 March 2017 but were postponed due to the sudden death of Derry City captain Ryan McBride. All ties were re-arranged to take place in the first week of April 2017, with the exception of Galway United vs Mayo League (played on 27 March 2017).

| 27 March 2017 | Galway United | 2–0 | Mayo League | Eamonn Deacy Park |
| 19:45 | David Cawley 45'; Vinny Faherty 90' |

| 4 April 2017 | Cobh Ramblers | 2–0 | Avondale United | St. Colman's Park |
| 19:45 | Matthew Whelan 52'; Shane Lowth 77' |

| 4 April 2017 | Wexford | 0–5 | Waterford | Ferrycarraig Park |
| 20:00 | | | David McDaid 26', 88'; Gary Delaney 44'; Owen Wall 87', 90' |

| 3 April 2017 | Finn Harps | 3–1 | Cockhill Celtic | Finn Park |
| 20:00 | Jonathon Bonner 29', 76'; Sean Houston 81' | | Oisin McColgan 72' |

| 4 April 2017 | Drogheda United | 0–1 | Bray Wanderers | United Park |
| 19:45 | | | Ryan Brennan 12' |

| 4 April 2017 | St Patrick's Athletic | 1–0 | Bluebell United | Richmond Park |
| 19:45 | Billy Dennehy 43' |

| 4 April 2017 | Athlone Town | 3–4 | Longford Town | Athlone Town Stadium |
| 19:45 | Conor Barry 6'; Cormac Rafferty 34'; Walter Invernizzi 70' | | David O'Sullivan 25', 69', 73'; Cody Mulhall 84' |

| 4 April 2017 | Bohemians | 1–0 | Cabinteely | Dalymount Park |
| 19:45 | Stephen Nolan 47' |

== Second round ==
The draw for the Second Round took place on 5 April 2017. The games were scheduled for Easter Monday 17 April 2017.

| 17 April 2017 | Limerick | 0–3 | Cork City | Market's Field |
| 17:00 | | | Garry Buckley 22'; Shane Tracey 62' (o.g.); Shane Griffin 68' |

| 17 April 2017 | Galway United | 2–0 | Derry City | Eamon Deacy Park |
| 19:45 | Kevin Devaney 27'; Vinny Faherty 90' |

| 17 April 2017 | Dundalk | 1–1 (a.e.t.) (6–5 p) | UCD | Oriel Park |
| 17:00 | Conor Clifford 76' | | Gary O'Neil 22' |

| 17 April 2017 | Shelbourne | 0–2 | Longford Town | Tolka Park |
| 19:00 | | | Gavin Boyne 39'; Dylan McGlade 75' |

| 17 April 2017 | Waterford | 2–0 | Cobh Ramblers | Regional Sports Centre |
| 15:00 | Dean O' Halloran 28'; Derek Daly 86' |

| 17 April 2017 | Finn Harps | 0–1 | Sligo Rovers | Finn Park |
| 19:00 | | Report | Matthew Stevens 90' |

| 17 April 2017 | Saint Patrick's Athletic | 0–0 (a.e.t.) (5–3 p) | Bray Wanderers | Richmond Park |
| 17:00 |

| 17 April 2017 | Shamrock Rovers | 3–1 | Bohemians | Tallaght Stadium |
| 19:30 | Darren Meenan 3'; Brandom Miele 69', 75' | | Ian Morris 12' |

== Quarter-finals ==
The draw for the quarter-finals took place on 19 April 2017 with the ties due to be played on 1 May 2017 and 2 May 2017.

| 1 May 2017 | Sligo Rovers | 2–2 (a.e.t.) (1–3 p) | * Galway United | Showgrounds |
| 15:00 | Matt Stevens 93'; Kieran Sadlier 115' (pen.) | Report | Ronan Murray 95'; Gavan Holohan 105' |
| | Penalties |
| | (penalty missed) Craig Roddan; (penalty missed) Liam Martin; (penalty scored) Kieran Sadlier; (penalty missed) Jonah Ayunga | | Stephen Folan (penalty scored); Ronan Murray (penalty missed); Colm Horgan (penalty missed); Padraic Cunningham (penalty scored); Gavan Holohan (penalty scored) |

| 1 May 2017 | Cork City | 2–0 | St Patrick's Athletic | Turners Cross |
| 16:00 | Connor Ellis 67'; Stephen Dooley 90' |

| 1 May 2017 | Dundalk | 3–0 | Waterford | Oriel Park |
| 17:00 | Ciarán Kilduff 57'; Thomas Stewart 72'; Conor Clifford 79' |

| 2 May 2017 | Shamrock Rovers | 1–0 | Longford Town | Tallaght Stadium |
| 19:30 | Dean Dillon 84' |

== Semi-finals ==
The draw for the semi-finals were made on 17 May 2017 with the fixtures due to take place on 7 August 2017.

| 7 August 2017 | Shamrock Rovers | 1–0 (a.e.t.) | Cork City | Tallaght Stadium |
| 19:00 | James Doona 120' | Report |

| 7 August 2017 | Galway United | 0–3 | Dundalk | Eamonn Deacy Park |
| | | Report | McGrath 11'; Benson 56'; Kevin Devaney (o.g.) 78' | Attendance: 1,017; Referee: Ray Matthews |

== Final ==
| 16 September 2017 | Shamrock Rovers | 0–3 | Dundalk | Tallaght Stadium |
| 15:00 | Bolger (yellow card) 48' (yellow-red card) 65' | Report | McMillan 5'; McEleney 81'; Stewart 90+3' | Attendance: 4,102; Referee: Derek Tomney |
