= 2000–01 League of Ireland Premier Division =

League of Ireland Premier Division
- Season: 2000–01
- Teams: 12
- Champions: Bohemians (8th title)
- Relegated: Finn Harps; Kilkenny City
- UEFA Champions League: Bohemians
- UEFA Cup: Shelbourne; Longford Town
- UEFA Intertoto Cup: Cork City
- FAI Super Cup: Bohemians; Shelbourne; Longford Town; Cork City
- Top goalscorer: Glen Crowe (Bohemians); 25 goals
- Average attendance: 1,709

The 2000–01 League of Ireland Premier Division was the 16th season of the League of Ireland Premier Division.

The division was made up of 12 teams. Bohemians won the title, their first league championship in 23 years.

== Standings ==
The season saw each team playing three rounds of games, playing every other team three times, totalling 33 games.

=== Final Table ===
Pos	Team	Pld	W	D	L	GF	GA	GD	Pts	Qualification or relegation
1	Bohemians (C)	33	18	8	7	66	35	+31	62	Qualification to Champions League first qualifying round
2	Shelbourne	33	17	9	7	53	37	+16	60	Qualification to UEFA Cup qualifying round
3	Cork City	33	15	11	7	36	29	+7	56	Qualification to Intertoto Cup first round
4	Bray Wanderers	33	15	10	8	52	35	+17	55	
5	St Patrick's Athletic	33	14	11	8	54	41	+13	53	
6	Derry City	33	12	9	12	31	28	+3	45	
7	Shamrock Rovers	33	10	12	11	50	47	+3	42	
8	Longford Town	33	12	6	15	40	47	−7	42	Qualification to UEFA Cup qualifying round (Note: Longford Town qualified for the UEFA Cup qualifying round after reaching the 2001 FAI Cup Final.)
9	Galway United	33	10	10	13	34	47	−13	40	
10	UCD (O)	33	9	10	14	36	44	−8	37	Qualification to Relegation play-off
11	Finn Harps (R)	33	8	12	13	36	46	−10	36	Relegation to League of Ireland First Division
12	Kilkenny City (R)	33	1	6	26	14	66	−52	9	Relegation to League of Ireland First Division

Source: www.rsssf.com
(C) Champions; (O) Play-off winners; (R) Relegated

=== Results ===
==== Matches 1–22 ====
Home \ Away	BOH	BRW	COR	DER	FHA	GAL	KLC	LON	SHM	SHE	StP	UCD
Bohemians	—	1–0	0–1	1–1	1–0	2–2	2–1	1–0	0–1	0–1	2–1	2–0
Bray Wanderers	3–1	—	1–0	1–0	0–0	0–1	3–0	3–1	1–1	3–0	2–2	1–0
Cork City	0–0	0–0	—	0–2	1–0	2–0	3–1	0–0	1–2	1–1	0–4	2–1
Derry City	0–2	1–1	1–1	—	2–0	0–1	1–0	0–0	2–0	1–1	1–1	0–1
Finn Harps	1–1	1–0	0–1	0–1	—	1–0	1–1	2–1	0–0	2–2	0–1	1–1
Galway United	0–2	2–2	0–2	1–0	1–1	—	1–2	1–0	1–0	0–0	1–1	1–2
Kilkenny City	0–0	2–2	0–0	0–1	0–1	0–1	—	0–1	0–4	0–3	0–2	0–1
Longford Town	1–3	0–1	2–1	1–0	4–1	2–1	2–1	—	2–1	0–1	0–3	2–0
Shamrock Rovers	0–0	1–2	1–2	2–0	2–0	0–0	2–1	3–1	—	1–3	1–1	1–1
Shelbourne	2–4	0–1	0–1	0–1	0–0	3–1	1–0	1–1	2–2	—	3–1	3–1
St Patrick's Athletic	2–1	1–1	1–1	1–0	1–4	3–0	3–0	2–1	0–1	0–2	—	1–1
UCD	0–1	1–1	0–0	0–1	1–1	0–1	1–0	0–2	2–1	0–1	1–1	—

Legend: Blue = home team win; Yellow = draw; Red = away team win.

==== Matches 23–33 ====
Home \ Away	BOH	BRW	COR	DER	FHA	GAL	KLC	LON	SHM	SHE	StP	UCD
Bohemians	—	3–1	1–1	—	5–1	5–0	—	—	—	—	2–2	—
Bray Wanderers	—	—	—	2–1	—	2–1	5–0	—	2–2	—	4–1	1–2
Cork City	—	1–0	—	1–0	—	3–1	—	1–0	—	—	1–0	2–2
Derry City	1–0	—	—	—	3–1	0–1	—	0–1	—	3–3	1–1	—
Finn Harps	—	4–1	1–1	—	—	—	2–0	2–2	2–2	—	—	—
Galway United	—	—	—	—	5–2	—	2–0	—	1–1	1–1	2–2	1–4
Kilkenny City	0–5	—	1–4	0–2	—	—	—	1–1	1–1	—	—	—
Longford Town	1–6	1–3	—	—	—	2–2	—	—	—	0–1	—	2–0
Shamrock Rovers	4–6	—	4–1	2–3	—	—	—	3–2	—	—	1–2	—
Shelbourne	4–2	3–2	2–0	—	0–1	—	3–1	—	3–1	—	—	—
St Patrick's Athletic	—	—	—	—	2–1	—	3–0	2–4	—	4–1	—	2–1
UCD	3–4	—	—	1–1	3–2	—	2–1	—	2–2	1–2	—	—

Legend: Blue = home team win; Yellow = draw; Red = away team win.

== Promotion/relegation play-off ==
UCD who finished in tenth place played off against Athlone Town, the third placed team from the 2000–01 League of Ireland First Division.

=== 1st leg ===
15 May 2001	Athlone Town	2–1	UCD

=== 2nd leg ===
18 May 2001	UCD	2–1	Athlone Town

UCD win 4-2 on penalties after extra time and retain their place in the Premier Division.

== See also ==
- 2000–01 League of Ireland First Division
