= Kilkenny City A.F.C. =

Irish association football club

Kilkenny City
- Full name: Kilkenny City Association Football Club
- Nicknames: Black Cats; The Cats
- Founded: 1966 (as Emfa A.F.C.)
- Dissolved: 2008
- Ground: Buckley Park
- Capacity: 6,000 (1,850 seats)
- Chairman: Jim Rhatigan
- Manager: Martin Brennan
Home colours	Away colours

Kilkenny City Association Football Club was an Irish football club based in Kilkenny. They were founded as Emfa in 1966 and renamed in 1989. The club were founder members of the League of Ireland First Division in 1985 and played in it until 18 January 2008 when they announced that they had resigned their position in the league citing "lack of finance, poor results and paltry attendances". The club used Buckley Park as their home ground.

== History ==
=== 20th century ===
In 1966, a group of Leaving Certificate students made the most of having a free class at the local Christian Brothers school, CBS Kilkenny. The group, including future manager Jim Rhatigan, debated the pros and cons, devised a plan and, finally, resolved to start a football club. The club was originally known as Emfa (sometimes written EMFA, but not pronounced as initials). The name was a blend of Emmett Street (Em) and Fatima Place (fa) where Jim Rhatigan, Gerry Moran (who was credited with the blend) and the other founders grew up. Rhatigan was appointed as the club's secretary, a position he held for 50 years, and since then he has become closely associated with football in Kilkenny.

Initially, EMFA competed in the U18 Kilkenny and District Youth League under the management of Donie Butler. Donie Butler served as Commercial Manager of the FAI during the Jack Charlton years. The club was unable to afford a new set of jerseys and so agreed to play in an all white strip. The logic being that all the players had at least one white T-shirt or shirt they could wear. The club's colours changed to claret and blue before changing again to black and amber, coinciding with the renaming of the club.

In the 1971–72 season, the group progressed to playing junior football in the second division of the reformed Kilkenny & District League (K&DL). In their first season, Emfa won promotion from Division Two to Division One of the K&DL. Jim Rhatigan became their manager, and the club remained in junior football until 1984. During this period, the club purchased 5.7 acres (2.3 ha) of land from a local farmer by the name of Mick Murphy, owner of the adjacent Tennypark House, for £16,000 punts. They had previously played their home games at the Freshford Road grounds, St. James Park. The ground was originally called Tennypark and was later named Buckley Park in honour of Marty Buckley. A bid of one million was made for the club's grounds in the late eighties but was rejected in favour of football.

In 1984, the club won the Kilkenny league and cup double, while remaining undefeated throughout the entire season. It was decided that he club should apply for admission to the then League of Ireland (now the Airtricity League).

=== League of Ireland ===
In 1985, Emfa were one of six teams elected to the expanded League of Ireland. Their first League of Ireland game was played on 20 October 1985 at home to Derry City and ended in a 1–1 draw. In their maiden season, the club finished in tenth place, bottom of the First Division.

Emfa's first trophy at national level came in 1987, winning the League of Ireland First Division Shield by defeating Finn Harps 4–2 in Oriel Park.

In an attempt to enhance their appeal to a larger audience, the club changed its name to Kilkenny City in 1989. Along with the alteration of the name, the longstanding club colours of claret and blue were traded for the widely known black and amber of the successful Kilkenny county hurling team. The name change coincided with improved performances on the pitch and Kilkenny City finished fourth in the division, two points off the promotion places. The following season, under manager Joe McGrath, they reached the 1990–91 FAI Cup semi-final, before suffering defeat to Shamrock Rovers.

Former Republic of Ireland international Alfie Hale was appointed manager in 1995 and the following season Kilkenny City won the 1996–97 First Division title with 11 points to spare over their nearest rivals, Drogheda United. The victory brought promotion and Kilkenny City began the 1997–98 season as a Premier Division club for the first time. Their stay was short, however, as they finished in eleventh place the following season and were relegated back to the First Division.

In the 1999–2000 season, now managed by Pat Byrne, Kilkenny City finished third and beat Waterford United in a promotion-relegation playoff, securing their return to the Premier Division. However, the club were once again unable to extend their stay in the top flight beyond a single season. They finished bottom of the league, managing only a single league victory throughout 2000–01. General manager Jim Rhatigan wrote "Mud, Sweat and Jeers," a semi-autobiographical account of the club's founding.

=== 21st century ===
The club celebrated its 40th anniversary in 2006. The anniversary was celebrated with a memorial mass at Father Fiachra's Church presided over by Father Willie Purcell and complete with a gospel choir. Dave Bassett, former Wimbledon manager was the guest of honour with former Northern Ireland international, Gerry Taggart also attending the club's anniversary banquet at the Lyrath Estate Hotel.

2005 was notable for Kilkenny City by the arrival of Pat Scully. It was a season of two halves for the Black Cats. Their record before June read – played 15, won 1, drew 4 and lost 10. They sat on the bottom of the table with just 7 points out of a possible 45. The squad was bolstered in key areas with a handful of summer transfers, including David Cassidy from Derby County. The new signings turned things around and immediately went on a run of six victories in a row culminating with the 5–0 destruction of Dundalk at Dundalk's home patch. Their record post-June finally read – played 21, won 14, drew 4 and lost only 3. Scully and his signings had quite miraculously taken Kilkenny from bottom of the table about halfway through the season to fourth by the end of the season.

Scully's success attracted the attention of his former club, Shamrock Rovers. The newly-relegated club had sacked manager Roddy Collins and Scully was seen as the leading candidate. Scully was appointed as Rovers manager two days later, leaving Kilkenny to search for a replacement. Scully took the cream of the talent with him to Rovers including David Cassidy, Tadhg Purcell and Aidan Price.

=== Decline ===
Adrian Fitzpatrick, a former assistant manager at Waterford United, was appointed Scully's successor but was sacked in October 2006 following a series of poor results. Gary Coad, who won a First Division title with the Cats in 1996, took over as caretaker manager until the end of the season. Kilkenny finished the season bottom of the table, ten points adrift of their nearest rivals.

The club appointed former Kilkenny City defender Brendan Rea as their new manager ahead of the 2007 season, with RTÉ describing the move as an effort "to revive [the club's] flagging fortunes". However, by July 2007 Rea had resigned from his position, citing family commitments and pressure of work. Another former player, Tommy Gaynor, was then appointed manager with the club's Under-21 team manager, Noel Byrne, as his assistant. Gaynor subsequently departed the club two months later, leaving assistant Noel Byrne as the final caretaker manager of the club. On 10 November 2007, Kilkenny City played their last ever League of Ireland game, losing 3–1 at home to Finn Harps.

In January 2008, Kilkenny City resigned from the League of Ireland citing a "lack of finance, poor results and paltry attendances" as evidence that sustaining a senior soccer team was no longer possible.

=== Legacy ===
In 2011, the "Bring Back Kilkenny City AFC Foundation" was formed. Launched by a group of die-hard Kilkenny City fans, they faced immediate competition from F.C. Carlow's proposed move to Buckley Park for the 2012 season. There is also a campaign to save Buckley Park as a sporting venue.

== Notable former players ==
=== Internationals ===
Republic of Ireland internationals

- (Republic of Ireland) Synan Braddish

Republic of Ireland U21 internationals

- (Republic of Ireland) Paul McGee
- (Republic of Ireland) Michael Reddy

Other

- (Republic of Ireland) Tommy Gaynor
- (Republic of Ireland) John Coleman
- (Republic of Ireland) Tadhg Purcell
- (Republic of Ireland) Michael Walsh
- (Northern Ireland) Paul McAreavey
- (Republic of Ireland) Colin Falvey
- (England) Tony Hall

== Managerial history ==
- Jim Rhatigan: 1985–1989
- Eamonn Gregg: 1989–1990
- Joe McGrath : 1990–1991, 2000–2001
- Noel Synnott: 1991–1992
- Kieron Maher : (Caretaker)
- John Clery: 1992–1993
- John Cleary: 1993–1994
- Paddy Gallacher: 1994–1995
- Jimmy Donnelly : (Caretaker)
- Alfie Hale: 1995–1999
- Pat Byrne: 1999–2000
- Paul Power : (Caretaker)
- Billy Walsh: 2001–2003
- Tommy Lynch: 2003
- Ger Bickerstaffe: 2004
- Pat Scully: 2005
- Adrian Fitzpatrick: 2006
- Gary Coad (Caretaker)
- Brendan Rea: Jan–July 2007
- Tommy Gaynor: July–Sept 2007
- Noel Byrne: (Caretaker)

== Honours ==
- League of Ireland First Division: 1
  - 1996–97
- League of Ireland First Division Shield: 1
  - 1986–87

== Competition history ==
League

- Played 603
- Won 146
- Draw 150
- Lost 281
- Goals For 636
- Goals Against 899
- Points 539

All final positions are in Division 1 unless otherwise stated.

Chart of yearly table positions for Kilkenny City in League of Ireland

- As EMFA (1985–1990)
  - 1985–86: 10th
  - 1986–87: 9th
  - 1987–88: 10th
  - 1988–89: 9th
- As Kilkenny City
  - 1989–90: 4th
  - 1990–91: 7th
  - 1991–92: 8th
  - 1992–93: 9th
  - 1993–94: 8th
  - 1994–95: 10th
  - 1995–96: 7th
  - 1996–97: 1st
  - 1997–98: 11th (Premier Div)
  - 1998–99: 5th
  - 1999–00: 3rd
  - 2000–01: 12th (Premier Div)
  - 2001–02: 5th
  - 2002–03: 12th
  - 2004: 10th
  - 2005: 4th
  - 2006: 10th
  - 2007: 10th
- FAI Cup
  - 1990–91: Semi Final (lost to Shamrock Rovers 1–0, losing finalist that year).
  - 1996–97: Round 1 (lost to Bohemians 1–2 in replay at Dalymount Park)
  - 1997–98: Round 1 (lost to UCD 0–4)
  - 1998–99: Quarter Finals (Kilkenny City were forced to forfeit the replay to Finn Harps, the losing finalists that year, after drawing the first game 2–2 as they had only eleven fit players, that include's two goalkeepers)
  - 1999–00: Quarter Finals (lost to Bray Wanderers 0–2)
  - 2000–01: Quarter Finals (lost to Bohemian 2–7, winners that year)
  - 2001–02: Round 3 (lost to Dundalk 2–3, the eventual winners)
  - 2002–03: Quarter Finals (lost to Shamrock Rovers 0–1, the losing finalists that year)
  - 2003: Round 2 (lost to Limerick 1–2)
  - 2004: Round 3 (lost to Waterford United 2–7, the losing finalists that year)
  - 2005: Round 2 (lost to Finn Harps 0–1)
  - 2006: Round 2 (lost to UCD 0–2)
  - 2007: Round 3 {Lost to Cork City 5–1, the eventual winners}

== Attendances ==
- 2004: Average: 200 Highest: 400
- 2005: Average: 185 Highest: 400
- 2006: Average: 118 Highest: 278 (v Dundalk)

Record Attendance: 6,500 (FAI Cup Semi-final v Shamrock Rovers 28 April 1991)
