= 2019 FAI Cup final =

- Event: 2019 FAI Cup
Dundalk	Shamrock Rovers
1	1
- After extra time Shamrock Rovers won 4–2 on penalties
- Date: 3 November 2019
- Venue: Aviva Stadium, Dublin
- Referee: Derek Tomney
- Attendance: 33,111

The 2019 FAI Cup final, known as the 2019 Extra.ie FAI Cup final for sponsorship reasons, was the final match of the 2019 FAI Cup, the national association football cup of the Republic of Ireland. The match took place on Sunday 3 November 2019 at the Aviva Stadium in Dublin, and was contested by defending champions Dundalk and Shamrock Rovers.

The match was broadcast live on RTÉ Two and RTÉ Two HD in the Republic of Ireland, and via the RTÉ Player worldwide with commentary from George Hamilton.

== Route to the final ==
=== Dundalk ===
Dundalk entered the FAI Cup at the first round as a League of Ireland Premier Division club and holders of the FAI Cup following their victory the previous year. They played their first match away at the Munster Senior League's Cobh Wanderers. At St Colman's Park, Dundalk won 1–0 due to a goal from Georgie Kelly. The next round they were drawn with fellow Premier Division Derry City away. At the Ryan McBride Brandywell Stadium in Derry, Dundalk won 3–2 after extra time with goals from Daniel Kelly, Daniel Cleary and Georgie Kelly. In the quarter-final they played Premier Division Waterford away at the Waterford Regional Sports Centre. Dundalk won 3–1 with a hat-trick from Daniel Kelly. In the semi-final they played Premier Division Sligo Rovers and won away at The Showgrounds after a 1–0 with a goal from Michael Duffy.

=== Shamrock Rovers ===
Shamrock Rovers was also a Premier Division club and also started in the first round. They were drawn at home against Premier Division Finn Harps. They won 1–0 at their Tallaght Stadium due to a goal from Daniel Carr. In the next round they played First Division Drogheda United at home. Shamrock Rovers won 4–0 with goals from Gary O'Neill, Aaron Greene, Aaron McEneff, Sean Kavanagh. In the next round they played away at First Division Galway United. At Eamonn Deacy Park, Shamrock Rovers won due to goals from Greene and Lee Grace. In the semi-finals they played Bohemians away at Dalymount Park. Rovers won 2–0 due to goals from Graham Burke and Greene to reach the final.

== Prematch ==
Dundalk went into the final looking to retain the FAI Cup and win a treble of Irish domestic trophies after having won the 2019 League of Ireland Premier Division and 2019 League of Ireland Cup and be the first club since Derry City to win a treble in the Republic of Ireland. Shamrock Rovers, despite being the most historically successful club in the FAI Cup, were looking to win the FAI Cup for the first time since 1987 when they left their old Glenmalure Park stadium. This became known as the "Milltown Curse".

Dundalk's Chris Shields was ruled out of the match due to suspension for picking up eight yellow cards during the season, which was described as a "clerical error" due to Dundalk losing track of the number of bookings during the season. Dundalk appealed the one match ban to the Football Association of Ireland but the appeal was rejected. Shamrock Rovers fans marched to the final behind a white horse as part of a tradition that dated back to the 1940s where fans decided to march to Dalymount Park, Dublin where the FAI Cup final used to be held behind a white horse. They marched behind a white horse due to a lack of other available or affordable forms of transportation at the time. The white horse was also suggested as a reference to the 1923 FA Cup Final in England which was known as the "White Horse Final".

The match was attended by the President of Ireland, Michael D. Higgins. Prior to the match, the Republic of Ireland's national anthem "Amhrán na bhFiann" was played. Controversy arose after Shamrock Rovers' Northern Irish goalkeeper Alan Mannus refused to turn to face the flag of the Republic of Ireland during the anthem. Mannus stated he did not intend to offend and only did not turn towards it because he is not Irish. Some Irish football fans argued that he was disrespecting the flag, but his actions were defended by others and compared with Derry-born Republic of Ireland international James McClean who had done a similar action several times during the playing of the English and Northern Irish anthem "God Save the Queen" in the past. Players from the Northern Irish club Cliftonville had done a similar action by bowing their head during "God Save the Queen" at the Irish Cup final in 2018.

== Match summary ==
The match remained scoreless until the 89th minute. In the 89th minute, Aaron Greene was taken down by Dundalk goalkeeper Gary Rogers with Aaron McEneff scoring the penalty to put Shamrock Rovers into the lead. In injury time, Michael Duffy scored on the half volley to send the game into extra time. The match went to a penalty shoot-out which took place in front of the Shamrock Rovers fans after Rovers won the coin toss to decide sides. Duffy hit the crossbar and Shamrock Rovers' Joey O'Brien had scored his. Dundalk's Cleary then took their third penalty but it was saved by Mannus. Greg Bolger then scored for Shamrock Rovers before both teams scored with their fourth penalties with Gary O'Neill scoring the winning penalty, which resulted in Shamrock Rovers winning the match 4–2 on penalties. It was Shamrock Rovers's first FAI Cup win since 1987. The Irish Independent singled Mannus out for praise post-match for his goalkeeping performance during the match and also stated he should be remembered for the match, not for his choices pre-match.

3 November 2019
15:30

Dundalk	1–1 (a.e.t.)	Shamrock Rovers
Michael Duffy 90+3'	Report	Aaron McEneff 89' (pen.)
Penalties
Jamie McGrath (penalty scored); Michael Duffy (penalty missed); Daniel Cleary (penalty missed); Jordan Flores (penalty scored)	2–4	Jack Byrne (penalty scored); Joey O'Brien (penalty scored); Greg Bolger (penalty scored); Gary O'Neill (penalty scored)

Aviva Stadium, Dublin
Attendance: 33,111
Referee: Derek Tomney

Dundalk:
1	(Republic of Ireland) Gary Rogers
4	(Republic of Ireland) Seán Hoare
21	(Republic of Ireland) Daniel Cleary
3	(Republic of Ireland) Brian Gartland (c)
14	(Republic of Ireland) Dane Massey
18	(Republic of Ireland) Robbie Benson
16	(Republic of Ireland) Sean Murray
2	(Republic of Ireland) Sean Gannon
10	(Republic of Ireland) Jamie McGrath
7	(Northern Ireland) Michael Duffy
9	(Republic of Ireland) Patrick Hoban
Substitutes:
20	(Republic of Ireland) Aaron McCarey
44	(Republic of Ireland) Andy Boyle
6	(England) Jordan Flores
33	(Northern Ireland) Dean Jarvis
8	(Republic of Ireland) John Mountney
27	(Republic of Ireland) Daniel Kelly
12	(Republic of Ireland) Georgie Kelly
Manager:
(Republic of Ireland) Vinny Perth

Shamrock Rovers:
1	(Northern Ireland) Alan Mannus
28	(Republic of Ireland) Joey O'Brien
5	(Republic of Ireland) Lee Grace
4	(Republic of Ireland) Roberto Lopes
11	(Republic of Ireland) Seán Kavanagh
16	(Republic of Ireland) Gary O'Neill
10	(Northern Ireland) Aaron McEneff
8	(Republic of Ireland) Ronan Finn (c)
29	(Republic of Ireland) Jack Byrne
21	(Republic of Ireland) Graham Burke
22	(Republic of Ireland) Aaron Greene
Substitutes:
30	(Republic of Ireland) Kian Clarke
17	(Northern Ireland) Daniel Lafferty
6	(Republic of Ireland) Greg Bolger
7	(Republic of Ireland) Dylan Watts
23	(Republic of Ireland) Neil Farrugia
27	(Republic of Ireland) Brandon Kavanagh
26	(Republic of Ireland) Thomas Oluwa
Manager:
(Republic of Ireland) Stephen Bradley
