= Daniel Cleary (footballer) =

Irish footballer (born 1996)

Personal information
- Date of birth: 9 March 1996 (age 30)
- Place of birth: Dublin, Ireland
- Height: 1.82 m (6 ft 0 in)
- Position: Defender

Team information
- Current team: Shamrock Rovers
- Number: 6

Youth career
- –2011: Crumlin United
- 2011–2015: Liverpool

Senior career*
Years	Team	Apps	(Gls)
2016–2018	Birmingham City	0	(0)
2017	→ Solihull Moors (loan)	3	(0)
2018–2021	Dundalk	84	(7)
2022	St Johnstone	15	(0)
2022–	Shamrock Rovers	117	(8)

International career
- Republic of Ireland U15
- Republic of Ireland U17
- Republic of Ireland U18
- Republic of Ireland U19
- Republic of Ireland U21
- * Club domestic league appearances and goals as of 17:03, 9 November 2026 (UTC)

Daniel Cleary (born 9 March 1996) is an Irish professional footballer who plays as a defender for Shamrock Rovers. His previous clubs are Liverpool, Birmingham City, Solihull Moors, Dundalk and St Johnstone.

== Club career ==
=== Early career ===
Cleary grew up in Drimnagh, Dublin and played for local side Crumlin United at schoolboy level, the club that produced several international players including Robbie Keane. Aged 14 he had a trial with Birmingham City, but wasn't signed. He signed for Liverpool's Academy in 2011, aged 15.

=== Liverpool ===
Cleary made his Liverpool first team debut on 2 August 2015 in a pre-season friendly against Swindon Town, coming off the bench in the 57th minute replacing Trent Alexander-Arnold at right back in a 2–1 win at the County Ground. On 17 September 2015 Cleary's first involvement in a first team squad for a competitive match came when was included in the squad by Brendan Rodgers for a UEFA Europa League game away to Bordeaux but remained an unused substitute.

==== Tom Brewitt incident ====
During Cleary's time at Liverpool, he was deliberately injured by teammate Tom Brewitt in training, with Brewitt later owning up to doing so with the hopes of getting into the first team for an FA Cup tie and Cleary being ahead of him in the pecking order for centre backs. Cleary opted to leave the club in 2016 after 5 years at the club.

In 2024, Cleary revealed he was suing both Brewitt and Liverpool for contributing to the "loss of a top-level career", due to resulting further injury and depression.

=== Birmingham City ===
Cleary signed for EFL Championship club Birmingham City on 27 July 2016. Cleary played for the club's reserve side up until the summer of 2017 when we was loaned out. On 19 January 2018, after returning from his loan at Solihull Moors, Birmingham announced that Cleary had left the club by mutual consent, later admitting that he had fallen out of love with the game at that time.

==== Solihull Moors ====
On 26 July 2017, Cleary sealed a loan move to National League side Solihull Moors until 2 January 2018, alongside Birmingham teammate Connal Trueman. He made a total of three appearances during his time at the club.

=== Dundalk ===
Cleary signed for League of Ireland Premier Division club Dundalk on 15 February 2018. He scored his first goal in professional football on 2 June 2018 in a 5–2 win away to Shamrock Rovers and received a booking for celebrating the goal in front of Rovers manager Stephen Bradley in reference to not signing him after he had spent time on trial at the club in the month prior to joining Dundalk. Cleary won the first trophy of his career on 5 October 2018, as his side clinched the 2018 League of Ireland Premier Division with a 1–1 draw against St Patrick's Athletic. On 4 November 2018, Cleary came on as a late substitute in the 2018 FAI Cup Final as his side beat Cork City 2–1 to win the FAI Cup at the Aviva Stadium, completing the league and cup double. He was named League of Ireland Player of the Month for August on 12 September 2019. 2 days later, he played the full 120 minutes of the 2019 League of Ireland Cup Final and scored in the penalty shootout as his side won 4–2 on penalties to win the League Cup. Cleary and Dundalk claimed back to back league titles on 23 September 2019, as they beat Shamrock Rovers 3–2 to clinch the title. Cleary missed a penalty in the 2019 FAI Cup Final penalty shootout as Dundalk were beaten on penalties by Shamrock Rovers at the Aviva Stadium. On 11 November 2019, he played in the final of the inaugural Champions Cup, as his side beat NIFL Premiership champions Linfield 7–1 on aggregate to win the trophy. On 1 October 2020, Cleary scored in a 3–1 win against KÍ of the Faroe Islands at the Aviva Stadium to seal qualification to the UEFA Europa League Group Stages. He featured in all 6 of the club's group games, playing at home and away against Arsenal, Rapid Vienna and Molde. On 6 December 2020, Cleary played the full 120 minutes as Dundalk beat Shamrock Rovers 4–2 after extra time to win the 2020 FAI Cup Final. On 12 March 2021, Cleary played the full game in the 2021 President of Ireland's Cup and scored his penalty in the shootout as Dundalk beat Shamrock Rovers 4–3 on penalties after a 1–1 draw to win the trophy at Tallaght Stadium. He missed all 6 of the club's UEFA Europa Conference League qualifiers during the 2021 season due to spending a long spell out with a quadriceps tendon injury. On 4 November 2021, he scored an 86th-minute winner away to Drogheda United in the Louth Derby. Cleary's contract was up at the end of November 2021, with Scottish club St Johnstone reportedly interested in signing him.

=== St Johnstone ===
Cleary completed a move to Scottish Premiership side St Johnstone on 1 January 2022 on a 2 1/2-year contract. He made his debut for the club on 18 January 2022 in a 2–0 loss to Heart of Midlothian at Tynecastle Stadium. Cleary was released by St Johnstone in July 2022, with his manager Callum Davidson citing family reasons for the departure.

=== Shamrock Rovers ===
After leaving St Johnstone, Cleary signed a "multi-year deal" with Shamrock Rovers. He made his debut for the club on 29 July 2022, scoring in a 4–0 win over Bangor Celtic in the FAI Cup.

== International career ==
Cleary has represented the Republic of Ireland at Under-15, Under-17, Under-18, Under-19 and Under-21 level.

== Career statistics ==
As of match played 30 October 2026

Appearances and goals by club, season and competition
Club	Season	League			National cup (Note: Includes FA Cup, FAI Cup & Scottish Cup)		League cup (Note: Includes EFL Cup, League of Ireland Cup & Scottish League Cup)		Europe		Other		Total	
Club	Season	Division	Apps	Goals	Apps	Goals	Apps	Goals	Apps	Goals	Apps	Goals	Apps	Goals
Birmingham City	2016–17	EFL Championship	0	0	0	0	0	0	—		—		0	0
Birmingham City	2017–18	EFL Championship	0	0	0	0	—		—		—		0	0
Birmingham City	Total		0	0	0	0	0	0	—		—		0	0
Solihull Moors (loan)	2017–18	National League	3	0	0	0	—		—		—		3	0
Dundalk	2018	LOI Premier Division	26	3	5	0	1	0	2 (Note: Appearances in the UEFA Europa League)	0	0 (Note: Appearance in the President of Ireland's Cup)	0	34	3
Dundalk	2019	LOI Premier Division	23	2	4	1	4	0	4 (Note: 2 appearances in the UEFA Champions League; 2 appearances in the UEFA Europa League)	0	2 (Note: 1 appearance in the Champions Cup; 1 appearance in the Leinster Senior Cup)	0	37	3
Dundalk	2020	LOI Premier Division	12	1	3	0	—		9	0	—		24	1
Dundalk	2021	LOI Premier Division	23	1	2	0	—		0 (Note: Appearances in the UEFA Europa Conference League)	0	1	0	26	1
Dundalk	Total		84	7	14	1	5	0	15	0	3	0	121	8
St Johnstone	2021–22	Scottish Premiership	15	0	1	0	—		—		2 (Note: Appearances in Scottish Premiership play-offs)	0	18	0
St Johnstone	2022–23	Scottish Premiership	0	0	0	0	2	0	—		—		2	0
St Johnstone	Total		15	0	1	0	2	0	—		2	0	20	0
Shamrock Rovers	2022	LOI Premier Division	11	4	3	1	—		8 (Note: 2 appearances in the UEFA Europa League; 6 appearances in the UEFA Europa Conference League)	0	—		22	5
Shamrock Rovers	2023	LOI Premier Division	31	0	1	0	—		4 (Note: 2 appearances in the UEFA Champions League; 2 appearances in the UEFA Europa Conference League)	0	1	0	37	0
Shamrock Rovers	2024	LOI Premier Division	31	1	1	0	—		14 (Note: 4 appearances in the UEFA Champions League; 4 appearances in the UEFA Europa League; 6 appearances in the UEFA Conference League)	0	1	0	47	1
Shamrock Rovers	2025	LOI Premier Division	29	3	3	0	—		12 (Note: 1 appearance in the 2024–25 UEFA Conference League campaign; 11 appearances in the 2025–26 UEFA Conference League campaign)	0	0 (Note: Appearances in the Leinster Senior Cup)	0	44	3
Shamrock Rovers	2026	LOI Premier Division	15	0	0	0	—		0	0	1	0	16	0
Shamrock Rovers	Total		117	8	8	1	—		38	0	3	0	166	9
Career total			219	15	23	2	7	0	53	0	8	0	310	17

== Honours ==
Dundalk

- League of Ireland Premier Division: 2018, 2019
- FAI Cup: 2018, 2020
- League of Ireland Cup: 2019
- President of Ireland's Cup: 2019, 2021
- Champions Cup: 2019

Shamrock Rovers

- League of Ireland Premier Division: 2022, 2023, 2026
- President of Ireland's Cup: 2024

Individual

- League of Ireland Player of the Month: August 2019
