= 2019 Dundalk F.C. season =

Dundalk
2019 season
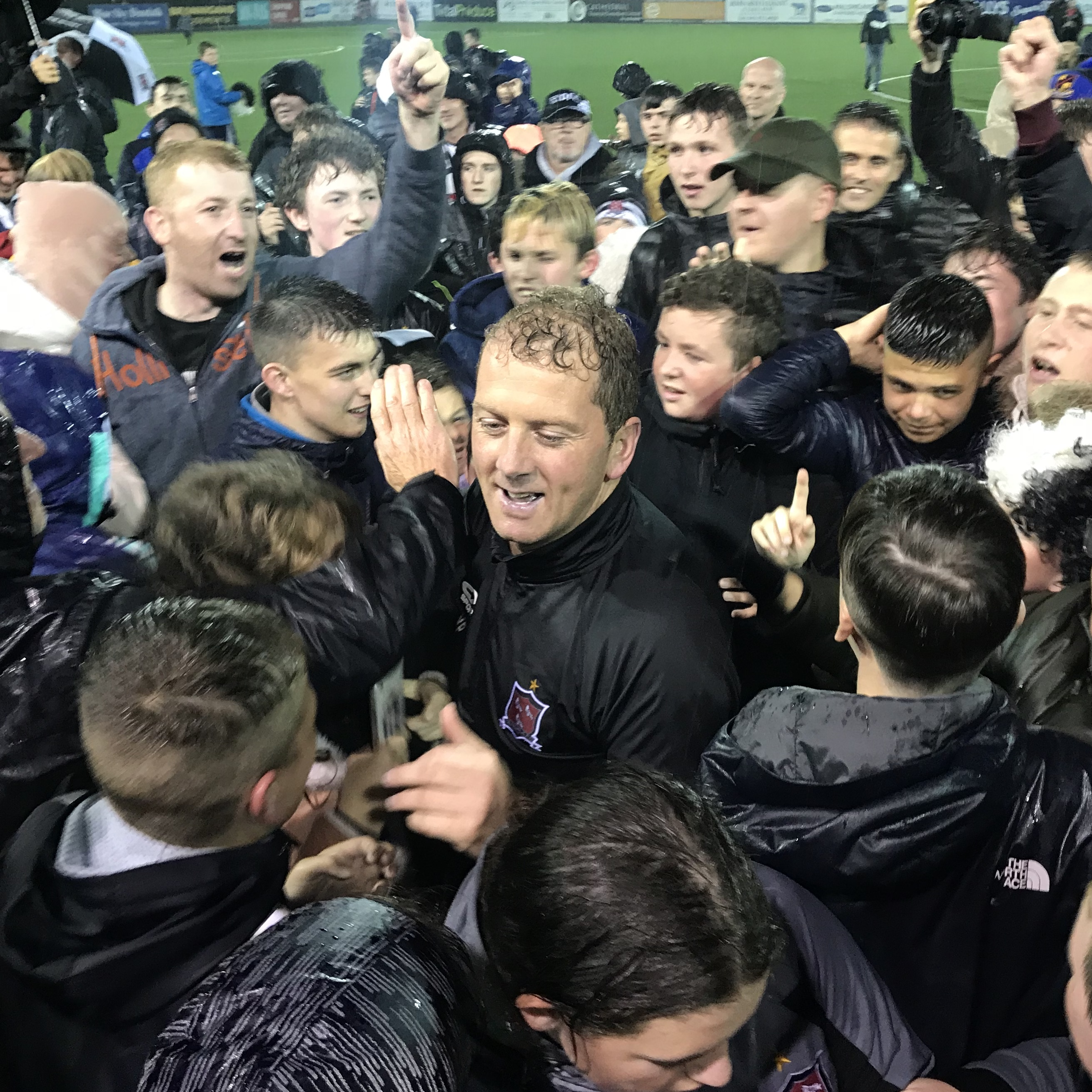
- Vinny Perth, Dundalk manager, celebrating the 2019 league title success with supporters in Oriel Park
- Manager: Vinny Perth
- Premier Division: 1st (champions)
- FAI Cup: Runners-up
- League Cup: Winners
- President's Cup: Winners
- Champions Cup: Winners
- Leinster Senior Cup: Round 4
- Champions League: 2Q
- Europa League: 3Q
- Top goalscorer: League: Patrick Hoban (13); All: Patrick Hoban (20)
- Highest home attendance: 4,026 (vs. Shamrock Rovers, 26 April 2019)
Home colours	Away colours	Third colours

Dundalk entered the 2019 season as the reigning League Champions and FAI Cup holders from 2018. They had a new management team of Vinny Perth and the returning John Gill, after Stephen Kenny (the manager since 2013) had resigned to accept the Republic of Ireland U-21 manager's role. The 2019 season was Dundalk's 11th consecutive season in the top tier of Irish football, their 84th in all, and their 93rd in the League of Ireland.

== Season summary ==
The new season's curtain raiser - the President's Cup - was played on 9 February in Turners Cross (stadium) between Dundalk and Cork City, the runners-up in both league and cup the previous year. Dundalk won on a 2-1 scoreline. The 36 round League programme commenced on 15 February 2019, and was completed on 25 October 2019. Dundalk retained their title with four games to spare, sealing the title in Oriel Park with a 3–2 victory over Shamrock Rovers on 23 September 2019. They had already won the League Cup, defeating Derry City on penalties in the Brandywell nine days earlier. Chasing a domestic Treble, they were defeated in a penalty shoot-out in the FAI Cup final by Shamrock Rovers. But they ended the season with a comprehensive 7–1 aggregate victory over Northern Irish champions, Linfield, in the inaugural Champions Cup (All-Ireland) – bringing the trophy haul in Perth's rookie season to four.

In Europe Dundalk entered the 2019-20 UEFA Champions League first qualifying round. After being seeded in the draw, they faced Riga, drawing the home leg in Oriel Park 0-0. The away leg in Riga was the club's 70th match in European football, which also finished 0-0. After extra-time failed to separate the sides, they won 5–4 in a sudden-death penalty shootout – their first in Europe, becoming the first Irish side to win a tie in that manner. They were knocked out in the second qualifying round by Qarabağ when a 1–1 home draw was followed by a 3–0 defeat away in Baku, which saw them receive a bye into the Europa League Third qualifying round. Their interest in Europe for the season ended there, with a 4-1 aggregate defeat to Slovan Bratislava. Both Qarabağ and Slovan subsequently reached the group stage of the Europa League.

=== First-Team Squad (2019) ===
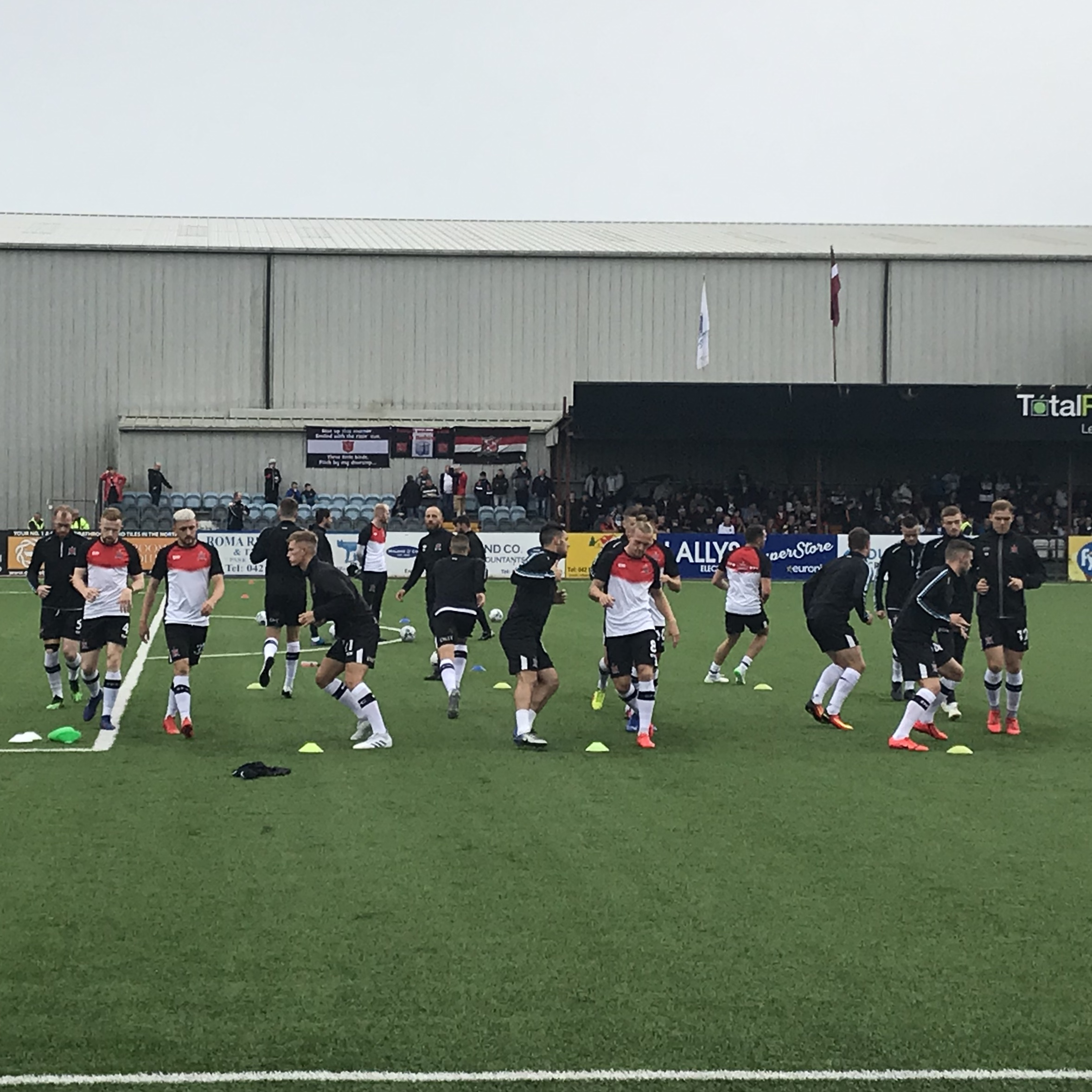
2019 squad warm-up before a match in Oriel Park

Squad No.	Name	Date of Birth	Position	Debut season	League appearances	Goals
1	(Republic of Ireland) Gary Rogers	25 September 1981	GK	2015	35	0
2	(Republic of Ireland) Seán Gannon	11 July 1991	DF	2014	33	1
3	(Republic of Ireland) Brian Gartland	4 November 1986	DF	2013	22	2
4	(Republic of Ireland) Seán Hoare	15 March 1994	DF	2017	28	4
5	(Republic of Ireland) Chris Shields	27 December 1990	MF	2012	29	0
6	(England) Jordan Flores	4 October 1995	MF	2019	16	1
7	(Northern Ireland) Michael Duffy	28 July 1994	MF	2017	34	12
8	(Republic of Ireland) John Mountney	22 February 1993	MF	2012	23	6
9	(Republic of Ireland) Patrick Hoban	28 July 1991	FW	2013	34	13
10	(Republic of Ireland) Jamie McGrath	30 September 1996	MF	2017	26	2
11	(Republic of Ireland) Patrick McEleney	26 September 1992	MF	2016	24	2
12	(Republic of Ireland) Georgie Kelly	12 November 1996	FW	2018	29	8
14	(Republic of Ireland) Dane Massey	17 April 1988	DF	2013	23	2
15	(Republic of Ireland) Stephen Folan	14 January 1992	DF	2018	0	0
16	(Republic of Ireland) Seán Murray	11 October 1993	MF	2019	25	3
17	(Northern Ireland) Cameron Dummigan	2 June 1996	DF	2019	14	1
18	(Republic of Ireland) Robbie Benson	7 May 1992	MF	2016	13	1
20	(Republic of Ireland) Aaron McCarey	14 January 1992	GK	2019	1	0
21	(Republic of Ireland) Daniel Cleary	9 March 1996	DF	2018	23	2
22	(Scotland) Joe McKee (Note: Loan signing, loan completed in May.)	31 October 1992	MF	2019	5	0
27	(Republic of Ireland) Daniel Kelly	21 May 1996	MF	2019	33	9
28	(Democratic Republic of the Congo) Lido Lotefa	18 April 2000	FW	2019	3	0
29	(Republic of Ireland) Dylan Hand	15 March 1999	DF	2019	1	0
30	(Republic of Ireland) Ross Treacy	26 September 1998	GK	2018	0	0
33	(Northern Ireland) Dean Jarvis	1 June 1992	DF	2018	19	1
44	(Republic of Ireland) Andy Boyle	7 March 1991	DF	2013	8	1

== Competitions ==
=== President's Cup ===
9 February 2019
17:30 GMT (UTC±00:00)

Cork City	1–2	Dundalk
K. O'Connor 65'	Report	36' Massey; 45+1' Hoban

Turners Cross
Attendance: 2,777
Referee: Robert Hennessy

=== Premier Division ===
Pos	Team	Pld	W	D	L	GF	GA	GD	Pts	Qualification or relegation
1	Dundalk (C)	36	27	5	4	73	18	+55	86	Qualification for Champions League first qualifying round
2	Shamrock Rovers	36	23	6	7	62	21	+41	75	Qualification for Europa League first qualifying round (Note: Since the winners of the 2019 FAI Cup (Shamrock Rovers) qualified for European competition based on their league position, the final spot awarded to the Cup winner passed to the next best-placed team i.e fourth-placed team.)
3	Bohemians	36	17	9	10	47	28	+19	60	Qualification for Europa League first qualifying round
4	Derry City	36	15	12	9	56	34	+22	57	Qualification for Europa League first qualifying round
5	St Patrick's Athletic	36	14	10	12	29	35	−6	52	

Source: SSE Airtricity League, Soccerway
Rules for classification: 1) Points; 2) Goal difference; 3) Goals scored.
(C) Champions

=== FAI Cup ===
First round

10 August 2019	Cobh Ramblers	0–1	Dundalk	Cobh
19:00		Report	Georgie Kelly 67'	Stadium: St Colman's Park; Referee: Raymond Matthews

Second round

23 August 2018	Derry City	2–3 (a.e.t.)	Dundalk	Derry
19:45	Greg Sloggett 51'; Darren McCauley 84'	Report	Daniel Kelly 33'; Daniel Cleary 53'; Georgie Kelly 117'	Stadium: Ryan McBride Brandywell Stadium; Referee: Robert Harvey

Quarter Final

9 September 2019	Waterford	1–3	Dundalk	Waterford
19:45	Maxim Kouogum 56'	Report	Daniel Kelly 9' 23' 33'	Stadium: Regional Sports Centre; Attendance: 954; Referee: Paul Tuite

Semi-final

29 September 2019	Sligo Rovers	0–1	Dundalk	Sligo
17:00		Report	Michael Duffy 89'	Stadium: The Showgrounds; Attendance: 4,079; Referee: Rob Harvey

Final

3 November 2019	Dundalk	1–1 (a.e.t.) (2–4 p)	Shamrock Rovers	Dublin
15:40	Michael Duffy 90+3'	Report	Aaron McEneff 89' (pen.)	Stadium: Aviva Stadium; Attendance: 33,111; Referee: Derek Tomney

=== League Cup ===
Second round

1 April 2019	St Patrick's Athletic	1–2	Dundalk	Inchicore, Dublin
19:45 GMT	James Doona 12'	Report	Georgie Kelly 6'; Dean Jarvis 34'	Stadium: Richmond Park; Referee: Robert Harvey

Quarter Final

27 May 2019	Dundalk	3–1	UCD	Dundalk
19:45 GMT	Brian Gartland 7'; John Mountney 18'; Georgie Kelly 90'	Report	Yousef Mahdy 80'	Stadium: Oriel Park; Attendance: 500 (estimate); Referee: David Dunne

Semi-final

19 August 2019	Dundalk	6–1	Bohemians	Dundalk
19:45	Patrick Hoban 4', 10', 14', 51'; Patrick McEleney 42'; Daniel Kelly 71'	Report	Ross Tierney 62'	Stadium: Oriel Park; Attendance: 1,500 (estimate); Referee: Paul McLaughlin

Final

14 September 2019	Derry City	2–2 (a.e.t.) (5–6 p)	Dundalk	Derry
20:00	David Parkhouse 3'; Junior Ogedi-Uzokwe 51'	Report	Michael Duffy 38'; Sean Gannon 69'	Stadium: Brandywell Stadium; Attendance: 3,000 (est); Referee: Robert Hennessy (Dublin)

=== Champions Cup ===
8 November 2019 First leg	(Northern Ireland) Linfield	1–1	Dundalk (Republic of Ireland)	Windsor Park, Belfast
20:00	Shayne Lavery 9'	Report	Daniel Kelly 51'	Attendance: 2,819; Referee: Ian McNabb

11 November 2019 Second leg	(Republic of Ireland) Dundalk	6–0	Linfield (Northern Ireland)	Oriel Park, Dundalk
19:05	Georgie Kelly 6'; Brian Gartland 16'; Jamie McGrath 34'; Robbie Benson 65'; Georgie Kelly 75'; Patrick Hoban 85'	Report		Attendance: 2,412; Referee: Stephanie Frappart

Dundalk won 7–1 on aggregate.

=== Leinster Senior Cup ===
Fourth round

18 February 2019	Dundalk	0–1	Athlone Town	Dundalk, County Louth
19:45 GMT		Report	Dean Williams 66'	Stadium: Oriel Park; Attendance: 250 (est.); Referee: Alan Carey

=== Europe ===
==== Champions League ====
First qualifying round

10 July 2019
20:45 (19:45 IST)

Dundalk (Republic of Ireland)	0–0	(Latvia) Riga
	Report

Oriel Park, Dundalk
Attendance: 3,100
Referee: Peter Kralovič (Slovakia)
17 July 2019
18:30 (19:30 EEST)

Riga (Latvia)	0–0 (a.e.t.)	(Republic of Ireland) Dundalk
	Report
Penalties
Debelko (penalty scored); Šarić (penalty scored); Gabovs (penalty scored); Brisola (penalty missed); Panić (penalty missed); Rakels (penalty scored); Pētersons (penalty missed)	4–5	(penalty scored) Hoban; (penalty scored) Murray; (penalty scored) Jarvis; (penalty missed) Massey; (penalty missed) G. Kelly; (penalty scored) McGrath; (penalty scored) Hoare

Skonto Stadium, Riga
Attendance: 6,050
Referee: Dimitar Mečkarovski (North Macedonia)

0–0 on aggregate. Dundalk won 5–4 on penalties.

Second qualifying round

24 July 2019
20:45 (19:45 IST)

Dundalk (Republic of Ireland)	1–1	(Azerbaijan) Qarabağ
Hoban 78'	Report	Emreli 4'

Oriel Park, Dundalk
Attendance: 3,100
Referee: Bartosz Frankowski (Poland)
31 July 2019
19:00 (21:00 AZT)

Qarabağ (Azerbaijan)	3–0	(Republic of Ireland) Dundalk
Jaime Romero 12', 87'; Ailton 76'	Report

Dalga Arena, Baku
Attendance: 5,832
Referee: Svein Oddvar Moen (Norway)

Qarabağ won 4–1 on aggregate.

==== Europa League ====
Third qualifying round

7 August 2019
20:15

Slovan Bratislava (Slovakia)	1–0	(Republic of Ireland) Dundalk
Holman 86'	Report

Tehelné pole, Bratislava
Attendance: 9,980
Referee: Frank Schneider (France)
13 August 2019
21:00 (20:00 IST)

Dundalk (Republic of Ireland)	1–3	(Slovakia) Slovan Bratislava
Duffy 70'	Report	Ratão 12'; Čavrić 33'; Daniel 90+3'

Tallaght Stadium, Dublin
Attendance: 4,199
Referee: Robert Schörgenhofer (Austria)

== Awards ==
=== Player of the Month ===
Month	Player	Reference
May	(Republic of Ireland) Sean Gannon	
August	(Republic of Ireland) Daniel Cleary	
September	(Northern Ireland) Michael Duffy	

=== SWAI Personality of the Year ===
Person	Reference
(Republic of Ireland) Vinny Perth	

=== SWAI Goalkeeper of the Year ===
Person	Reference
(Republic of Ireland) Gary Rogers	
