= Jordan Flores =

English footballer (born 1995)

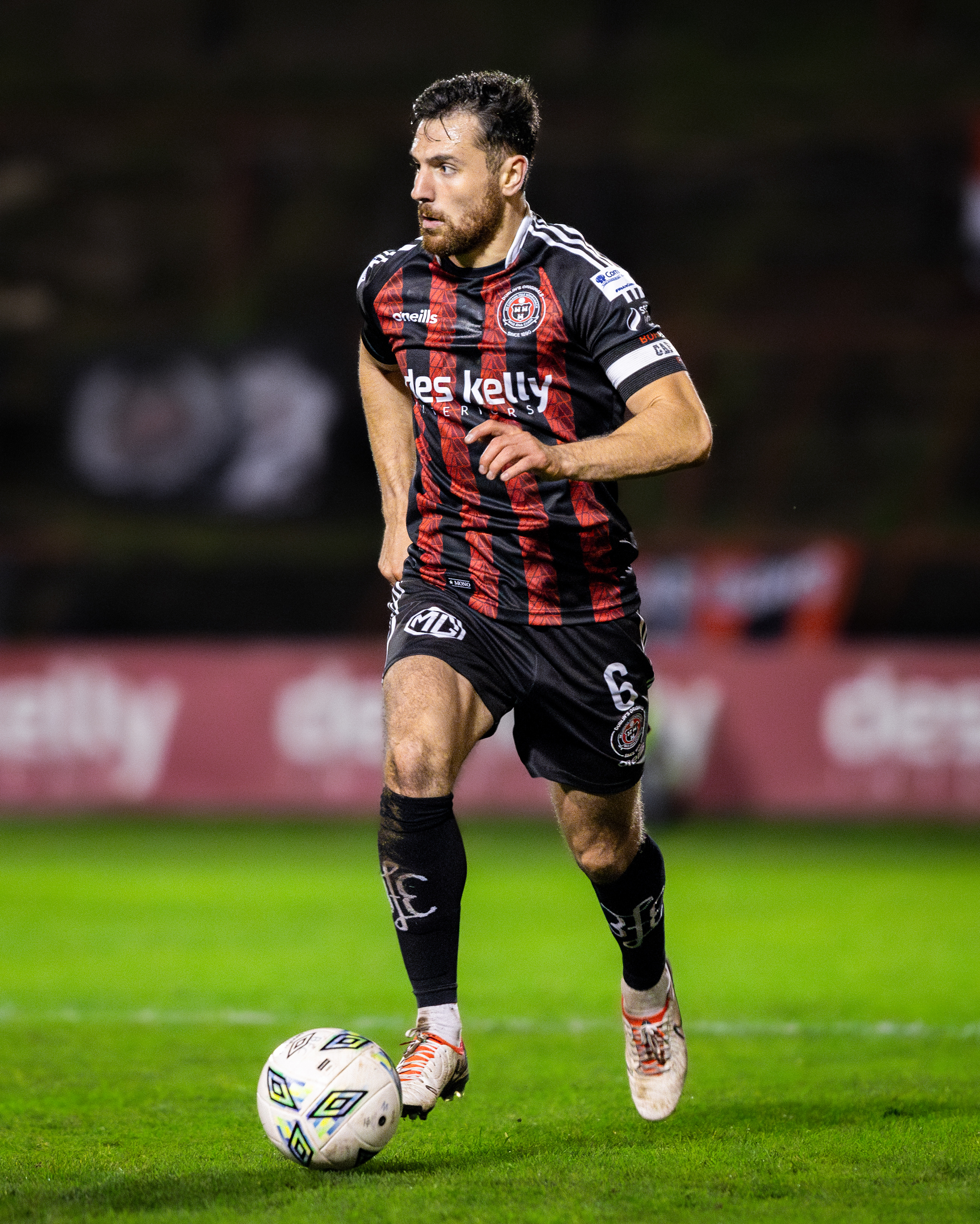

Personal information
- Full name: Jordan Michael Flores
- Date of birth: 4 October 1995 (age 31)
- Place of birth: Wigan, England
- Height: 1.80 m (5 ft 11 in)
- Positions: Midfielder; defender

Team information
- Current team: Bohemians
- Number: 6

Youth career
- –2014: Wigan Athletic

Senior career*
Years	Team	Apps	(Gls)
2014–2019	Wigan Athletic	6	(1)
2017	→ Blackpool (loan)	21	(3)
2017	→ Chesterfield (loan)	13	(1)
2018	→ Fylde (loan)	1	(0)
2018	→ Östersund (loan)	0	(0)
2019–2020	Dundalk	40	(7)
2021	Hull City	3	(0)
2021	→ Northampton Town (loan)	0	(0)
2021–2022	Northampton Town	11	(0)
2022–	Bohemians	152	(15)
- * Club domestic league appearances and goals as of 18:04, 31 October 2026 (UTC)

Jordan Michael Flores (born 4 October 1995) is an English professional footballer who plays as a midfielder or defender for League of Ireland Premier Division side Bohemians.

== Club career ==
=== Wigan Athletic ===
Born in Wigan, Flores began his career at hometown team Wigan Athletic, a team he grew up supporting and was season ticket holder, along with his father, Manny. He first joined the club when he was 15 having initially been a Centre of Excellence player. After progressing through the U16 side, Flores was promoted to the U18 side in the summer of 2012.

Flores was first included in a matchday squad for his Wigan Athletic on 12 August 2014, remaining an unused substitute as they lost 1–2 to League Two team Burton Albion at the Pirelli Stadium in the first round of the League Cup. He was first called up for a league match on 31 January 2015, again remaining unused for their goalless Championship draw away to Ipswich Town at Portman Road, and was also on the bench for two more games in February. He made his professional debut on 2 May on the final day of the season, with Wigan already relegated to League One, replacing Tim Chow after 64 minutes of an eventual 0–3 defeat to Brentford at Griffin Park. At the end of the 2014–15 season, Flores signed a one–year contract with the club after being offered a contract extension.

On 19 September 2015, Flores made his first league start for Wigan Athletic and scored his first senior goal in a 2–1 win against Fleetwood Town at the DW Stadium. A week later, he was sent off in a 1–1 draw at Oldham Athletic for a retaliatory kick at Jay Fulton. Following this, Flores served a three match suspension. Although he served the three match suspension, he spent most of the season on the substitute bench and played in the development squad. He also faced with injury concerns after injuring his shoulder at the end of 2015. At the end of the 2015–16 season, Flores was named the club's Young Player of the Season and won Goal of the Season following a vote by Wigan Athletic supporters. In addition, he signed a one–year contract, keeping him until 2017.

Ahead of the 2016–17 season, Flores recovered from a shoulder injury and was featured for the club's pre–season tour. He then made his first appearance of the season, where he started the whole game, in a 2–1 loss against Oldham Athletic on 9 August 2016. Flores went on to make two more league appearances for the side by January. At the end of the 2016–17 season, Flores signed a two–year contract after being offered an extension to stay at the club.

In the 2017–18 season, Flores scored on his only appearance for Wigan Athletic, in a 2–1 win over Blackpool in the first round of the League Cup.

==== Loan Spells from Wigan Athletic ====
On 30 January 2017, Flores signed for League Two club Blackpool on loan for the remainder of the season. He made his debut five days later in a 1–1 draw with Colchester United at Bloomfield Road, playing the full 90 minutes. He scored his first goal for the Tangerines in a 4–1 victory at Carlisle United on 11 February 2017. After the match, Flores was voted Man of the Match by the club's supporters. Since joining the club, Flores quickly established himself in the first team and quickly made an impression for the side. Flores scored his second goal for Blackpool, in a 3–0 win over Plymouth Argyle on 7 March 2017. A month later, on 17 April 2017, he scored his third goal for Blackpool, in a 1–0 win over Doncaster Rovers. He later helped Blackpool earn promotion back to League One at the first attempt. At the end of the 2016–17 season, having made 21 appearances and scoring 3 times, he returned to his parent club, Wigan Athletic.

On 18 August 2017, Flores was loaned to League Two club Chesterfield a season-long loan deal. He made his Chesterfield debut the next day, where he started the whole game, in a 2–0 win over Port Vale on 19 August 2017. It wasn't until on 17 October 2017 when he scored his first Chesterfield goal, in a 2–0 win over Crawley Town. However, his loan was cut short after being involved in a car accident and never played for the side again. By the time of his departure, he went on to make 15 appearances for the side.

After his loan spell at Chesterfield was terminated, Flores joined Conference side AFC Fylde on loan until 4 April 2018. His only appearance came on 24 March 2018, where he started as left–back and played for 62 minutes before being substituted, in a 2–0 loss against Dagenham & Redbridge.

On 9 August 2018, Flores joined Allsvenskan side Östersunds on loan until the end of 2018.

=== Dundalk ===
On 25 January 2019, Irish champions Dundalk announced the signing of Flores on a two-year deal. In his first season at the club, he scored one goal in 16 league appearances to help win the Premier Division title as well as the League Cup, the President's Cup and the Champions Cup. He featured regularly in the 2020–21 UEFA Europa League group stage and scored in the 3–1 defeat against Molde FK in Norway and scored again in the final group game against Arsenal, but lost 4–2. In November 2020 he was one of 12 players nominated for the 2020 Puskas Award for a goal he scored for Dundalk against Shamrock Rovers in February 2020. He was part of the team that won the 2020 FAI Cup on 6 December, beating Shamrock Rovers 4–2 at the Aviva Stadium.

=== Hull City ===
On 13 January 2021, Flores joined Hull City on a free transfer, signing an 18-month contract. On 19 January 2021, he came on as a substitute for Richie Smallwood in the 3–0 home win against Accrington Stanley.

=== Northampton Town ===
He joined League Two club Northampton Town initially on a season-long loan on 22 June 2021. This was made into a permanent deal on 6 August 2021, when Hull City released him from his contract. On 31 January 2022 the club cancelled his contract after 14 appearances for the club in all competitions.

=== Bohemians ===
On 31 January 2022, it was announced that Flores had returned to the League of Ireland Premier Division, signing a multi-year contract at Bohemians.

== Personal life ==
Flores attended Our Lady's, Aspull and revealed that his mother worked for the school. Flores said he's an active user on social media. He also stated that he is of Spanish heritage.

Flores was involved in a two-car head-on accident while on his way to the Proact Stadium on 23 October 2017 for training with Chesterfield. He was initially taken to the Chesterfield Royal Hospital NHS Foundation Trust by ambulance before being transferred to the Northern General Hospital in Sheffield. By November, he was discharged from the hospital and began rehabilitating his injuries sustained from the crash. Four months after the crash, Flores was charged with driving offence after it was found that he was driving without due care and attention, which led to a road smash. Ultimately, he was fined £902 after pleading guilty to driving without due care and attention. In December 2020, Flores auctioned off his 2020 FAI Cup Final winners medal that he won with Dundalk, in aid of a local children's charity.

== Career statistics ==
As of match played on 30 October 2026

Club	Season	League			National Cup (Note: Includes FA Cup, Svenska Cupen & FAI Cup)		League Cup (Note: Includes League of Ireland Cup & EFL Cup)		Europe		Other		Total	
Club	Season	Division	Apps	Goals	Apps	Goals	Apps	Goals	Apps	Goals	Apps	Goals	Apps	Goals
Wigan Athletic	2014–15	Championship	1	0	0	0	0	0	—		—		1	0
Wigan Athletic	2015–16	League One	3	1	0	0	1	0	—		2 (Note: Appearances in EFL Trophy)	0	6	1
Wigan Athletic	2016–17	Championship	2	0	1	0	1	0	—		—		4	0
Wigan Athletic	2017–18	League One	0	0	—		1	0	—		—		1	0
Wigan Athletic	Total		6	1	1	0	3	0	—		2	0	12	1
Blackpool (loan)	2016–17	League One	21	3	—		—		—		—		21	3
Chesterfield (loan)	2017–18	League Two	13	1	0	0	—		—		2	0	15	1
AFC Fylde (loan)	2017–18	National League	1	0	—		—		—		0 (Note: Appearances in National League Play-offs)	0	1	0
Östersund (loan)	2018	Allsvenskan	0	0	0	0	—		—		—		0	0
Dundalk	2019	LOI Premier Division	16	1	1	0	2	0	0 (Note: Appearances in UEFA Champions League & UEFA Europa League)	0	1 (Note: Appearances in Champions Cup)	0	20	1
Dundalk	2020	LOI Premier Division	13	3	3	1	—		5 (Note: 1 appearance in UEFA Champions League & 4 appearances, 2 goals in UEFA Europa League)	2	—		21	6
Dundalk	Total		29	4	4	1	2	0	5	2	1	0	41	7
Hull City	2020–21	League One	3	0	—		—		—		1	0	4	0
Northampton Town	2021–22	League Two	11	0	0	0	1	0	—		2	0	14	0
Bohemians	2022	LOI Premier Division	28	3	1	0	—		—		—		29	3
Bohemians	2023	LOI Premier Division	30	5	4	0	—		—		1 (Note: Appearances in Leinster Senior Cup)	1	35	6
Bohemians	2024	LOI Premier Division	29	3	3	0	—		—		0	0	32	3
Bohemians	2025	LOI Premier Division	33	2	1	0	—		—		0	0	34	2
Bohemians	2026	LOI Premier Division	32	2	2	0	—		6 (Note: Appearances in UEFA Conference League)	0	0	0	40	2
Bohemians	Total		152	15	11	0	—		6	0	1	1	170	16
Career Total			236	24	16	1	6	0	5	2	15	1	277	26

== Honours ==
Wigan Athletic

- Football League One: 2015–16

Blackpool

- EFL League Two play-offs: 2017

Dundalk

- League of Ireland Premier Division: 2019
- FAI Cup: 2020
- League of Ireland Cup: 2019
- President's Cup: 2019
- Champions Cup: 2019

Hull City

- EFL League One: 2020–21
