= 2021 Dundalk F.C. season =

Dundalk
2021 season
- Team Manager: Shane Keegan (until 17 April); Jim Magilton (Interim from 19 April); Vinny Perth (from 16 June)
- Premier Division: 6th
- FAI Cup: Semi-final
- President's Cup: Winners
- Conference League: QR3
- Top goalscorer: League: Patrick Hoban (12); All: Patrick Hoban (20)
- Highest home attendance: 3,600 (est) (Vs. Derry City, 19 November 2021)
Home colours	Away colours

Dundalk entered the 2021 season as the FAI Cup holders, and were still the League of Ireland Cup holders, having won it in 2019, because of the competition not running in 2020. Having qualified for European football for the eighth season in a row, they were entered in the new UEFA Europa Conference League. 2021 was Dundalk's 13th consecutive season in the top tier of Irish football, their 86th in all, and their 95th in the League of Ireland.

Jim Magilton was the club's new Sporting Director going into the new term, having taken up the role at the end of the 2020 season. Shane Keegan was named the First Team Manager at the beginning of the season, replacing Interim Head Coach from 2020, Filippo Giovagnoli, who was retained as First Team Coach. Giovagnoli could not be named manager because he did not hold a UEFA Pro Licence.

== Season summary ==
For the second season in a row, both the League of Ireland Cup and the Leinster Senior Cup were deferred because of delays and restrictions caused by the ongoing COVID-19 pandemic.

Having not been held in 2020, the President's Cup (the traditional season curtain-raiser) was played on 12 March between League Champions Shamrock Rovers and FAI Cup holders Dundalk. Dundalk won the match on penalties, 4–3, after it had finished 1–1 in 90 minutes.

The league season started a week later on 19 March 2021 and after a run of defeats at the start of the league campaign, which saw Dundalk lie second from bottom after five matches, both Keegan and Giovagnoli resigned. Sporting Director Jim Magilton assumed a caretaker manager role, pending the appointment of a new manager. On 16 June, Vinny Perth, who had been sacked midway through the previous season, returned to the club as manager. They continued to struggle in the league and were briefly threatened with a promotion/relegation play-off, before recovering somewhat to end the season in sixth place.

In the FAI Cup, a run of six appearances in a row in the final (a joint record for the competition) was ended when they were knocked out at the semi-final stage by St Patrick's Athletic, managed by former captain Stephen O'Donnell.

In Europe, they defeated Newtown A.F.C. of Wales in the first qualifying round of the new Europa Conference League 5–0 on aggregate, which included a club European record equaling 4–0 victory in the first leg. In the second qualifying round, they overcame Levadia Tallinn 4–3 on aggregate with Will Patching scoring a stoppage time winner in the second leg in Estonia. They were knocked out in the third qualifying round by Vitesse Arnhem, 4–3 on aggregate, after a 2–1 defeat in the second leg at 'home' in Tallaght Stadium, which saw a Michael Duffy goal after 40 seconds incorrectly disallowed for offside.

Before the season ended, the club was returned to local ownership when a consortium led by former co-owner Andy Connolly and sports technology firm STATSports agreed a takeover with PEAK6. Sporting Director Jim Magilton left the club in the aftermath of the takeover.

=== First-Team Squad (2021) ===
Sources: Note: Substitute appearances in brackets

No.	Name	DOB	Pos.	Debut	League		FAI Cup		Europe		Others		Totals	
No.	Name	DOB	Pos.	Debut	Apps	Goals	Apps	Goals	Apps	Goals	Apps	Goals	Apps	Goals
1	(Albania) Alessio Abibi	4 December 1996	GK	2021	20	0	1	0	6	0	1	0	28	0
3	(Republic of Ireland) Brian Gartland	4 November 1986	DF	2013	1	0	0	0	0	0	0	0	1	0
4	(Republic of Ireland) Andy Boyle	7 March 1991	DF	2013	35	1	4	0	6	0	1	0	46	1
5	(Republic of Ireland) Chris Shields (Note: transferred to Linfield on 1 July 2021)	27 December 1990	MF	2012	16	3	0	0	0	0	1	0	17	3
6	(Faroe Islands) Sonni Nattestad	5 August 1994	DF	2021	8 (5)	0	1 (1)	0	6	0	1	1	22	1
7	(Republic of Ireland) Michael Duffy	28 July 1994	MF	2017	31 (3)	4	3	1	4	2	0	0	41	7
8	(Scotland) Sam Stanton	19 April 1994	MF	2021	25 (4)	1	4	0	6	0	1	0	40	1
9	(Republic of Ireland) Patrick Hoban	28 July 1991	FW	2013	26 (1)	12	4	7	1 (2)	1	0 (1)	0	35	20
10	(Republic of Ireland) Greg Sloggett	3 July 1996	MF	2020	21 (8)	1	4 (1)	0	3 (1)	0	0 (1)	0	39	1
11	(Republic of Ireland) Patrick McEleney	26 September 1992	MF	2016	17 (4)	2	0 (1)	1	6	2	1	0	29	5
12	(Scotland) Cameron Yates	14 February 1999	GK	2021	1	0	1	0	0	0	0	0	2	0
13	(Latvia) Raivis Jurkovskis	7 December 1996	DF	2021	26 (2)	0	4 (1)	0	5 (1)	0	1	0	40	0
14	(Scotland) Peter Cherrie	1 October 1983	GK	2009	15	0	3	0	0	0	0	0	18	0
15	(Republic of Ireland) Darragh Leahy	15 April 1998	DF	2020	18 (5)	0	3 (1)	0	6	0	1	0	34	0
16	(Republic of Ireland) Seán Murray	11 October 1993	MF	2019	17 (10)	6	4	2	0 (3)	0	0	0	34	8
17	(Norway) Ole Erik Midtskogen (Note: departed club 13 August 2021)	12 April 1995	FW	2021	5 (7)	1	1	0	0 (3)	0	0	0	16	1
17	(Morocco) Sami Ben Amar (Note: signed for the club 17 August 2021)	2 March 1998	FW	2021	8 (6)	1	2 (1)	1	0	0	0	0	17	2
18	(England) Will Patching (Note: on loan at Derry City until 1 July 2021)	18 October 1998	MF	2020	15 (1)	0	3 (1)	0	5	3	0	0	25	3
19	(Central African Republic) Wilfried Zahibo (Note: signed 17 April 2021)	21 August 1993	MF	2021	6 (6)	0	1 (1)	0	1 (4)	0	0	0	19	0
20	(England) Junior Ogedi-Uzokwe (Note: on loan to Derry City as of 1 July 2021)	3 March 1994	FW	2021	5 (7)	2	0	0	0	0	1	0	13	2
21	(Republic of Ireland) Daniel Cleary	9 March 1996	DF	2018	24	1	2	0	0	0	1	0	27	1
23	(Northern Ireland) Cameron Dummigan	2 June 1996	DF	2019	26 (3)	0	5	0	1 (1)	0	0 (1)	0	37	0
24	(Republic of Ireland) Mayowa Animasahun (Note: signed professional contract on 10 August 2021)	8 August 2003	DF	2021	0 (6)	0	1 (2)	0	0	0	0	0	9	0
25	(Republic of Ireland) Val Adedokun (Note: transferred to Brentford on 24 August 2021)	14 February 2003	MF	2020	4 (2)	0	0 (1)	0	0 (1)	0	0	0	8	0
27	(Republic of Ireland) Daniel Kelly	21 May 1996	MF	2019	12 (7)	3	1 (1)	0	5 (1)	0	0	0	27	3
28	(Republic of Ireland) Ryan O'Kane	16 August 2003	MF	2021	1 (7)	0	0 (1)	0	0 (1)	0	0	0	10	0
29	(Republic of Ireland) David McMillan	14 December 1988	FW	2015	9 (11)	4	1 (1)	0	5 (1)	3	1	0	29	7
77	(South Korea) Jeongwoo Han (Note: signed 25 March 2021)	26 December 1998	FW	2021	6 (7)	1	2	1	0 (2)	1	0	0	17	3
90	(United States) Jesús Pérez (Note: on loan to Forward Madison as of 1 July 2021)	1 October 1997	MF	2021	0 (2)	0	0	0	0	0	0	0	2	0

==== Out on loan ====
Note: Flags indicate national team as defined under FIFA eligibility rules; some limited exceptions apply. Players may hold more than one non-FIFA nationality.

No.	Pos.	Nation	Player
12	DF	IRL	Andrew Quinn (at Bray Wanderers until 31 December 2021)
20	FW	ENG	Junior Ogedi-Uzokwe (at Derry City until 31 December 2021)
22	MF	USA	Taner Dogan (at Forward Madison until 31 December 2021)
90	MF	USA	Jesús Pérez (at Forward Madison until 31 December 2021)
—	DF	CAN	Terique Mohammed (at York United until 31 December 2021)

== Competitions ==
Win Draw Loss

=== President's Cup ===
12 March 2021	Shamrock Rovers	1–1 (3–4 p)	Dundalk	Tallaght Stadium
19:45 GMT	Danny Mandroiu (yellow card) 22'; Liam Scales 47'; Chris McCann (yellow card) 59'; Joey O'Brien (yellow card) 60'	Report	Raivis Jurkovskis (yellow card) 26'; Daniel Cleary (yellow card) 32'; Sonni Nattestad 42'; Sonni Nattestad (red card) 59'; Chris Shields (yellow card) 60'	Attendance: 0 Referee: Damien MacGraith
	Penalties
	Dylan Watts (penalty scored); Aaron Greene (penalty scored); Joey O'Brien (penalty scored); Rory Gaffney (penalty missed); Graham Burke (penalty missed); Roberto Lopes (penalty missed)		(penalty scored) Patrick Hoban; (penalty missed) Greg Sloggett; (penalty scored) Daniel Cleary; (penalty scored) Chris Shields; (penalty missed) Andy Boyle; (penalty scored) Darragh Leahy

=== Premier Division ===
20 March 2021 Round 1	Sligo Rovers	1–1	Dundalk	The Showgrounds
18:00	Romeo Parkes 23'	Report	Patrick McEleney 16'	Attendance: 0 Referee: Neil Doyle

26 March 2021 Round 2	Dundalk	1–2	Finn Harps	Oriel Park
17:45	Patrick Hoban 48'	Report	Adam Foley 43', 63'	Attendance: 0 Referee: Derek Tomney

2 April 2021 Round 3	Shamrock Rovers	2–1	Dundalk	Tallaght Stadium
19:45	Danny Mandroiu 35'; Dylan Watts 76'	Report	Patrick Hoban 89'	Attendance: 0 Referee: Paul McLoughlin

9 April 2021 Round 4	Dundalk	0–1	Bohemians	Oriel Park
19:45		Report	Georgie Kelly 13' (pen.)	Attendance: 0 Referee: Rob Harvey

17 April 2021 Round 5	Dundalk	1–1	St Patrick's Athletic	Oriel Park
18:00	Junior Ogedi-Uzokwe 85'	Report	Sam Bone 59'	Attendance: 0 Referee: Damien MacGraith

20 April 2021 Round 6	Derry City	1–1	Dundalk	Ryan McBride Brandywell Stadium
19:45	Cameron McJannet 61'	Report	David McMillan 54'	Attendance: 0 Referee: Rob Hennessy

24 April 2021 Round 7	Dundalk	2–1	Drogheda United	Oriel Park
18:00	David McMillan 24'; Jeongwoo Han 71'	Report	Chris Lyons 90'	Attendance: 0 Referee: Adriano Reale

30 April 2021 Round 8	Waterford	0–3	Dundalk	Waterford Regional Sports Centre
19:45		Report	Andy Boyle 25'; Chris Shields 43' (pen.); Michael Duffy 46'	Attendance: 0 Referee: Derek Tomney

3 May 2021 Round 9	Longford Town	2–2	Dundalk	Bishopsgate
17:45	Dylan Grimes 6'; Rob Manley 14'	Report	Junior 20'; Chris Shields 81'	Attendance: 0 Referee: Damien MacGraith

7 May 2021 Round 10	Dundalk	0–1	Sligo Rovers	Oriel Park
19:45		Report	Jordan Gibson 39'; Garry Buckley (red card) 53'	Attendance: 0 Referee: Robert Hennessy

14 May 2021 Round 11	Finn Harps	1–1	Dundalk	Finn Park
17:45	Barry McNamee 19'	Report	Ole Erik Midstkogen 49'	Attendance: 0 Referee: Neil Doyle

21 May 2021 Round 12	Dundalk	2–1	Shamrock Rovers	Oriel Park
19:45	Patrick McEleney 11'; Daniel Kelly 59'	Report	Joey O'Brien 13'	Attendance: 0 Referee: Rob Harvey

24 May 2021 Round 13	Bohemians	5–1	Dundalk	Dalymount Park
17:45	Georgie Kelly 5', 50', 64'; Tyreke Wilson 51'; Promise Omochere 90'; Tyreke Wilson (red card) 51'	Report	Greg Sloggett 80'; Cameron Dummigan (red card) 74'	Attendance: 0 Referee: Ben Connolly

28 May 2021 Round 14	St Patrick's Athletic	0–2	Dundalk	Richmond Park
19:45		Report	Sam Bone o.g. 32'; David McMillan 51'	Attendance: 0 Referee: Neil Doyle

12 June 2021 Round 15	Dundalk	1–3	Waterford	Oriel Park
19:45	Patrick Hoban 30' (pen.)	Report	John Martin 44', 75'; Shane Griffin 62'	Attendance: 100; Referee: John McLoughlin

19 June 2021 Round 16	Dundalk	1–1	Longford Town	Oriel Park
19:45	Chris Shields 28'	Report	Aaron McNally 12'	Attendance: 100; Referee: Robert Hennessy

21 June 2021 Round 17	Drogheda United	0–1	Dundalk	Head In The Game Park
19:45		Report	Michael Duffy 35'	Attendance: 100; Referee: Graham Kelly

25 June 2021 Round 18	Dundalk	2–1	Derry City	Oriel Park
19:45	Daniel Kelly 36'; Patrick Hoban 56' (pen.)	Report	Eoin Toal 60'	Attendance: 100; Referee: Rob Harvey

2 July 2021 Round 19	Shamrock Rovers	3–1	Dundalk	Tallaght Stadium
19:45	Liam Scales 37'; Sean Gannon 45'; Aaron Greene 75'	Report	Patrick Hoban 11'	Attendance: 1000; Referee: Damien MacGraith

17 July 2021 Round 20	Dundalk	1–0	Finn Harps	Oriel Park
16:00	David McMillan 33'	Report		Attendance: 200; Referee: Rob Harvey

8 August 2021 Round 21	Dundalk	1–4	St Patrick's Athletic	Oriel Park
15:00	Patrick Hoban 25'	Report	Melvin-Lambert 11'; Smith 41', 79'; Forrester 71' (pen.)	Attendance: 200; Referee: Rob Harvey

15 August 2021 Round 22	Derry City	1–0	Dundalk	Ryan McBride Brandywell Stadium
15:00	McGonigle 50' (pen.)	Report		Attendance: 1,150; Referee: Damien MacGraith

20 August 2021 Round 23	Dundalk	1–2	Drogheda United	Oriel Park
19:45	Michael Duffy 58'	Report	Mark Doyle 35', 56'	Attendance: 500; Referee: Ben Connolly

3 September 2021 Round 24	Waterford	1–1	Dundalk	Waterford Regional Sports Centre
19:45	Wordsworth 77'	Report	Sean Murray 5'	Attendance: 1,800 (est); Referee: John McLoughlin

11 September 2021 Round 25	Longford Town	1–0	Dundalk	Bishopsgate
19:30	O'Driscoll 45'; Robinson (red card) 56'; Manley (red card) 85'	Report	Jeongwoo Han (red card) 90'	Attendance: 1,000 (est); Referee: Derek Tomney

15 September 2021 Round 26	Sligo Rovers	2–1	Dundalk	The Showgrounds
19:45	Andre Wright 20'; Lewis Banks 52'	Report	Patrick Hoban 18'	Attendance: 1,650; Referee: Ben Connolly

24 September 2021 Round 27	Dundalk	4–1	Sligo Rovers	Oriel Park
19:45	Sean Murray 12', 20'; Patrick Hoban 63', 90'	Report	Johnny Kenny 14'	Attendance: 1,800; Referee: Robert Harvey

27 September 2021 Round 28	Dundalk	2–1	Bohemians	Oriel Park
19:45	Sam Stanton 44'; Patrick Hoban 58'	Report	Tyreke Wilson 71'	Attendance: 1,800; Referee: Neil Doyle

1 October 2021 Round 29	Finn Harps	2–2	Dundalk	Finn Park
20:00	Tunde Owolabi 18', 68'	Report	Michael Duffy 59'; Patrick Hoban 62' (pen.)	Attendance: 1,500 (est); Referee: Adriano Reale

8 October 2021 Round 30	Dundalk	1–0	Shamrock Rovers	Oriel Park
19:45	Sean Murray 32'	Report		Attendance: 1,800; Referee: Rob Harvey

15 October 2021 Round 31	Bohemians	1–1	Dundalk	Dalymount Park
19:45	Georgie Kelly 90' (pen.)	Report	Sami Ben Amar 30'	Attendance: 2,400 (est); Referee: Damien MacGraith

25 October 2021 Round 32	St Patrick's Athletic	1–0	Dundalk	Richmond Park
19:45	Billy King 26'	Report		Attendance: 1,500 (est); Referee: Graham Kelly

29 October 2021 Round 33	Dundalk	1–0	Waterford	Oriel Park
19:45	Daniel Kelly 45'	Report		Attendance: 2,400 (est); Referee: John McLoughlin

5 November 2021 Round 34	Drogheda United	0–1	Dundalk	Head In The Game Park
19:45		Report	Daniel Cleary 86'	Attendance: 1,861; Referee: Rob Harvey

7 November 2021 Round 35	Dundalk	2–0	Longford Town	Oriel Park
17:00	Patrick Hoban 46'; Sean Murray 53'	Report		Attendance: 2,000 (est); Referee: Adriano Reale

19 November 2021 Round 36	Dundalk	1–2	Derry City	Oriel Park
19:45	Sean Murray 33'	Report	Ciaron Harkin 45'; Jamie McGonigle 52'	Attendance: 3,600 (est); Referee: Neil Doyle

==== League table ====
Pos	Team	Pld	W	D	L	GF	GA	GD	Pts	Qualification or relegation
1	Shamrock Rovers (C)	36	24	6	6	59	28	+31	78	Qualification for Champions League first qualifying round
2	St Patrick's Athletic	36	18	8	10	56	42	+14	62	Qualification for Europa Conference League second qualifying round (Note: Since the winners of the 2021 FAI Cup (St Patrick's Athletic) qualified for European competition based on their league position, the final spot awarded to the Cup winner passed to the next best-placed team, i.e. fourth-placed team.)
3	Sligo Rovers	36	16	9	11	43	32	+11	57	Qualification for Europa Conference League first qualifying round
4	Derry City	36	14	12	10	49	42	+7	54	Qualification for Europa Conference League first qualifying round
5	Bohemians	36	14	10	12	60	46	+14	52	
6	Dundalk	36	13	9	14	44	46	−2	48	
7	Drogheda United	36	12	8	16	45	43	+2	44	
8	Finn Harps	36	11	11	14	44	52	−8	44	
9	Waterford (R)	36	12	6	18	36	56	−20	42	Qualification for relegation play-offs
10	Longford Town (R)	36	2	9	25	22	71	−49	15	Relegation to League of Ireland First Division

Source: SSE Airtricity League, Soccerway
Rules for classification: 1) Points; 2) Goal difference; 3) Goals scored.
(C) Champions; (R) Relegated

=== FAI Cup ===
25 July 2021 Round 1	Treaty United	0–1 (a.e.t.)	Dundalk	Markets Field
14:00		Report	Patrick McEleney 104'	Attendance: 200; Referee: Neil Doyle

27 August 2021 Round 2	Dundalk	5–1	St Mochta's	Oriel Park
19:45	Sami Ben Amar 8'; Patrick Hoban 51' (pen.), 52', 61'; Jeongwoo Han 73'	Report	McCaffrey 12'	Attendance: 500; Referee: Graeham Kelly

17 September 2021 Quarter-final	Finn Harps	3–3	Dundalk	Finn Park
20:00	Tunde Owolabi 25'; Jordan Mustoe (red card) 28'; Sean Boyd 84', 90'	Report	Patrick Hoban 29' (pen.), 65'; Sean Murray 39'	Attendance: 1,690; Referee: Damien MacGraith

21 September 2021 QF Replay	Dundalk	3–1 (a.e.t.)	Finn Harps	Finn Park
19:45	Sean Murray 39'; Patrick Hoban 97' (pen.); Michael Duffy 105'	Report	Sean Boyd 6'	Attendance: 2,000 (est); Referee: Ben Connolly

22 October 2021 Semi-final	St Patrick's Athletic	3–1	Dundalk	Richmond Park
19:45	Billy King 26'; Matty Smith 57'; Darragh Burns 86'	Report	Patrick Hoban 41'	Attendance: 4,000; Referee: Neil Doyle

=== Europa Conference League ===
First qualifying round

8 July 2021 1st Leg	Dundalk	4–0	(Wales) Newtown	Oriel Park
17:45	Michael Duffy 32'; David McMillan 38'; Will Patching 62'; Jeongwoo Han 90'	Report		Attendance: 120; Referee: Barbeno Luca (San Marino)

13 July 2021 2nd Leg	(Wales) Newtown	0–1	Dundalk	Park Hall, Oswestry
17:45	Michael Duffy 52'	Report		Attendance: 174; Referee: Andrei Chivulete (Romania)

Dundalk won 5–0 on aggregate.

Second qualifying round

22 July 2021 1st Leg	Dundalk	2–2	(Estonia) Levadia Tallinn	Tallaght Stadium
20:00	Will Patching 3'; David McMillan 27'	Report	Bogdan Vaštšuk 2', 19'	Attendance: 880; Referee: Miroslav Zelinka (Czechia)

29 July 2021 2nd Leg	(Estonia) Levadia Tallinn	1–2	Dundalk	A. Le Coq Arena
17:30	Ernest Agyiri 17'	Report	David McMillan 44'; Will Patching 90'	Attendance: 1,875; Referee: Thorvaldur Árnason (Iceland)

Dundalk won 4–3 on aggregate.

Third qualifying round

5 August 2021 1st Leg	(Netherlands) Vitesse Arnhem	2–2	Dundalk	GelreDome
18:00	Bero 20'; Openda 89'; Openda (red card) 90'	Report	McEleney 65', 76'	Attendance: 8,756; Referee: Anastasios Papapetrou (Greece)

12 August 2021 2nd Leg	Dundalk	1–2	(Netherlands) Vitesse Arnhem	Tallaght Stadium
20:00	Hoban 71' (pen.)	Report	Bero 28'; Gboho 38'	Attendance: 1,475; Referee: Alain Durieux (Luxembourg)

Dundalk lost 4–3 on aggregate.
