= Sean Gannon =

Sean Gannon may refer to:

- Sean Gannon (footballer), Irish footballer
- Sean Gannon (musician), drummer for the band, The Magic Numbers
