= Daniel Kelly (footballer, born 1996) =

Irish footballer, born 1996

Personal information
- Date of birth: 21 May 1996 (age 30)
- Place of birth: Dublin, Ireland
- Position: Winger

Team information
- Current team: Shelbourne
- Number: 17

Youth career
- –2014: Cambridge Boys
- 2014–2015: Ringsend Rovers

Senior career*
Years	Team	Apps	(Gls)
2015–2016	St Patrick's CY		
2016–2017	Crumlin United		
2017–2018	St Patrick's CY		
2018	Bray Wanderers	23	(2)
2018	Bohemians	10	(5)
2019–2023	Dundalk	117	(26)
2024	Derry City	26	(1)
2025–	Shelbourne	51	(10)
- * Club domestic league appearances and goals as of 19:44, 10 November 2026 (UTC)

Daniel Kelly (born 21 May 1996) is an Irish professional footballer who plays as a winger for Shelbourne, a club in the League of Ireland Premier Division. His previous clubs include St Patrick's CY (over 2 spells), Crumlin United, Bray Wanderers, Bohemians, Dundalk, and Derry City.

== Career ==
=== Early career ===
A native of Ringsend, County Dublin, Kelly began playing his schoolboy football with local side Cambridge Boys, then played one season of junior football with Ringsend Rovers. In 2015, he joined Leinster Senior League side St Patrick's CY at senior level and later moved to Leinster Senior League Senior Division club Crumlin United for the 2016–17 season before returning to St Patrick's CY in 2017. In November 2017, he was part of the Leinster Senior League's representative side that won the 2017 Michael Ward Interprovincial Cup.

=== Bray Wanderers ===
His performance at the Leinster Senior League level caught the attention of League of Ireland clubs, leading to his signing with Bray Wanderers in January 2018. He made his first appearance for the club on 4 February 2018, in a 3–1 loss to St Patrick's Athletic in a Leinster Senior Cup tie at the Carlisle Grounds. He scored his first goal at League of Ireland Premier Division level on 23 March 2018, opening the scoring after 3 minutes in an eventual 2–1 defeat away to Bohemians at Dalymount Park. He made 25 appearances in all competitions with the club, scoring 2 goals before departing on 11 July 2018, with the club in financial difficulty.

=== Bohemians ===
On 11 July 2018, Kelly signed with fellow League of Ireland Premier Division side Bohemians. He made his debut for the club on 20 July 2018, scoring twice in a 6–0 win at home to his former side, Bray Wanderers. He scored 6 goals in 15 games in all competitions during his half-season with the club.

=== Dundalk ===
On 22 December 2018, Kelly signed a 2-year contract with Dundalk ahead of the 2019 season with the club beating off competition for his signature from Bohemians, Cork City, Shamrock Rovers and EFL Championship club Bolton Wanderers for his signature. His first goal for the club came on 4 March 2019 in a 4–0 win over Waterford at Oriel Park. On 14 September 2019, he was part of the team that defeated Derry City on penalties in the 2019 League of Ireland Cup final at the Ryan McBride Brandywell Stadium. He won the first league medal of his career on 24 September 2019, as his side beat Shamrock Rovers 3–2 at Oriel Park to secure the 2019 League of Ireland Premier Division title. On 4 November 2019, Kelly replaced Sean Murray from the bench in the 61st minute of the 2019 FAI Cup final as his side were defeated in a penalty shootout by Shamrock Rovers at the Aviva Stadium. On 11 November 2019, he was part of the side that beat NIFL Premiership champions Linfield 6–0 at Oriel Park to win the 2019 Champions Cup. On 1 October 2020, Kelly scored his side's third goal of the game in a 3–1 win over KÍ of the Faroe Islands at the Aviva Stadium to secure a Group Stage spot in the 2020–21 UEFA Europa League for his club, where they would go on to face Premier League club Arsenal, Molde of Norway and Rapid Vienna of Austria, with Kelly later describing the goal as his 'best moment in a Dundalk jersey'. On 6 December 2020, Kelly replaced Michael Duffy in the 111th minute of the 2020 FAI Cup final, before assisting David McMillan's hat-trick goal in the 117th minute to seal a 4–2 win over Shamrock Rovers at the Aviva Stadium. Kelly signed a new 1-year contract with the club on 23 December 2020. He played in all 6 of the club's UEFA Europa Conference League fixtures in the summer of 2021 as they defeated Newtown of Wales and FCI Levadia Tallinn of Estonia before narrowly being knocked out by Vitesse Arnhem of the Dutch Eredivisie. On 18 December 2021, he signed a new 2-year contract with the club. Kelly was named League of Ireland Player of the Month for the first time in his career, for the month of May 2022. He left the club on 16 November 2023, after scoring 35 goals in 158 appearances for the club over 5 seasons.

=== Derry City ===
Kelly signed a 2-year contract with Derry City on 17 November 2023. On 28 June 2024, Kelly scored his first goal for the club, in a 5–1 win over Drogheda United at the Ryan McBride Brandywell Stadium. He missed the 2024 FAI Cup final through a knee injury that required surgery, as his side were defeated 2–0 at the Aviva Stadium by Drogheda United. On 18 December 2024, it was announced that Kelly had left the club by mutual consent, after making 26 appearances in all competitions during his season with the club, scoring 1 goal. Kelly stated that departing the club was not a footballing decision and that it was related to having 'struggled mentally' as he found it difficult to settle in the northwest, with a string of disappointing performances, coupled with the knee injury which ended his season prematurely, compounding matters.

=== Shelbourne ===
On 19 December 2024, Kelly returned to Dublin, signing for the previous season's League of Ireland Premier Division winners Shelbourne ahead of their 2025 season.

== Personal life ==
Kelly is cousins with fellow professional footballer Abbie Larkin, who plays for the Republic of Ireland women's national team.

== Career statistics ==
As of match played on 30 October 2026

Appearances and goals by club, season and competition
Club	Season	League			National Cup (Note: Includes FAI Cup)		League Cup (Note: Includes League of Ireland Cup)		Europe		Other		Total	
Club	Season	Division	Apps	Goals	Apps	Goals	Apps	Goals	Apps	Goals	Apps	Goals	Apps	Goals
St Patrick's CY	2015–16	Leinster Senior League							—					
Crumlin United	2016–17	Leinster Senior League Senior Division							—					
St Patrick's CY	2017–18	Leinster Senior League							—					
Bray Wanderers	2018	LOI Premier Division	23	2	—		1	0	—		1 (Note: Appearance(s) in the Leinster Senior Cup)	0	25	2
Bohemians	2018	LOI Premier Division	10	5	4	1	—		—		1 (Note: Appearance in the Scottish Challenge Cup)	0	15	6
Dundalk	2019	LOI Premier Division	35	9	5	5	4	1	4 (Note: 3 appearances in the UEFA Champions League; 1 appearance in the UEFA Europa League)	0	3 (Note: 2 appearances, 1 goal in the Champions Cup; 1 appearance in the Leinster Senior Cup)	1	51	16
Dundalk	2020	LOI Premier Division	13	0	4	0	—		5 (Note: Appearance(s) in the UEFA Europa League)	1	—		22	1
Dundalk	2021	LOI Premier Division	19	3	2	0	—		6 (Note: Appearance(s) in the UEFA Europa Conference League)	0	0 (Note: Appearance in the President of Ireland's Cup)	0	27	3
Dundalk	2022	LOI Premier Division	23	6	1	0	—		—		—		24	6
Dundalk	2023	LOI Premier Division	27	8	3	0	—		4	1	0	0	34	9
Dundalk	Total		117	26	15	5	4	1	19	2	3	1	158	35
Derry City	2024	LOI Premier Division	26	1	2	0	—		2 (Note: Appearance(s) in the UEFA Conference League)	0	—		30	1
Shelbourne	2025	LOI Premier Division	19	2	2	1	—		12 (Note: 2 appearances in the UEFA Champions League; 2 appearances in the UEFA Europa League; 8 appearances in the UEFA Conference League)	0	0	0	33	3
Shelbourne	2026	LOI Premier Division	32	8	1	1	—		4	2	0	0	37	11
Shelbourne	Total		51	10	3	2	—		16	2	0	0	70	14
Career total			227	44	24	8	4	1	35	4	5	1	300	58

== Honours ==
=== Club ===
Dundalk

- League of Ireland Premier Division (1): 2019
- FAI Cup (1): 2020
- League of Ireland Cup (1): 2019
- President of Ireland's Cup (1): 2019
- Champions Cup (1): 2019

Leinster Senior League

- Michael Ward Interprovincial Cup (1): 2017

=== Individual ===
- League of Ireland Player of the Month (1): May 2022
