= Gary Rogers =

Irish footballer & coach (born 1981)

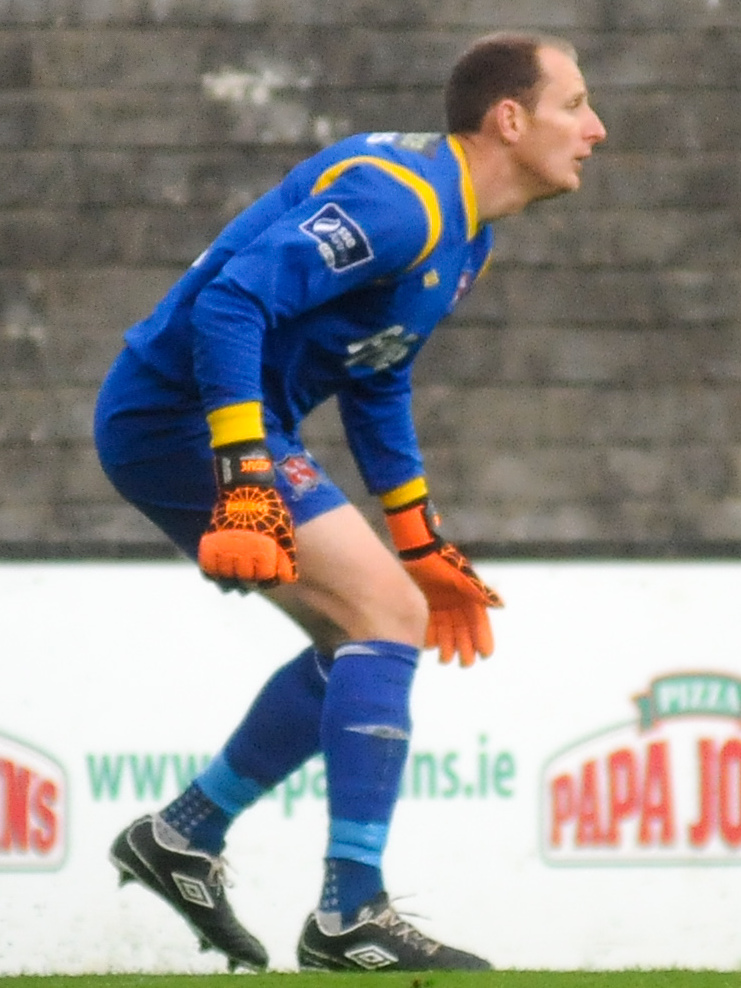
- Rogers with Dundalk in 2015

Personal information
- Date of birth: 25 September 1981 (age 45)
- Place of birth: Navan, Ireland
- Position: Goalkeeper

Senior career*
Years	Team	Apps	(Gls)
1999–2001	Shelbourne	0	(0)
2000–2001	→ St Francis (loan)	23	(0)
2001–2005	Drogheda United	128	(0)
2006	Dublin City	16	(0)
2006	Bray Wanderers	7	(0)
2007–2008	Galway United	62	(0)
2009–2011	St Patrick's Athletic	96	(0)
2012–2014	Sligo Rovers	83	(0)
2015–2020	Dundalk	168	(0)
Total		583	(0)

International career
	Republic of Ireland U21	2	(0)
2010	League of Ireland XI	1	(0)
- * Club domestic league appearances and goals

Gary Rogers (born 25 September 1981) is an Irish coach and former professional footballer who played as a goalkeeper, making 735 appearances in all competitions during his career. Rogers was also called up to the Republic of Ireland national football team. He also played Gaelic football for and coached the Meath county team, and has also coached the Cavan, Monaghan and Westmeath county teams.

== Playing career ==
=== Shelbourne ===
Rogers played with St Francis when he was younger and was spotted by Dermot Keely and was brought to the Shelbourne youth team. While with the youth team, he had a trial at Stockport County. He did not get a contract and upon his return he never made a first-team appearance for Shelbourne. He played for St Francis in the First Division for one season in 2000–01.

=== Drogheda United ===
At the age of 19 he moved to Drogheda United. He was a regular in the first team helping the club to promotion to the top flight in his first season and was the main factor in the Drogheda brilliant defensive record. He picked up his first FAI medal when he was part of the Drogheda FAI Cup winning squad in 2005.

=== Dublin City & Bray Wanderers ===
Disappointed with a lack of first-team appearances, he joined Dermot Keely's Dublin City in December 2005. However six months into his contract Dublin City pulled out of the League of Ireland and Rogers was without a club. He subsequently signed for Bray Wanderers. He stayed at Bray until the start of the 2007 season.

=== Galway United ===
Rogers signed for Galway United in February 2007, who were newly promoted to the Premier Division. Upon his signing, manager Tony Cousins said of Rogers: "Gary is a top class goalkeeper, has a lot of experience in the League of Ireland and I'm delighted to add a player of his ability to the team." Rogers became the first-choice goalkeeper and helped the Tribesmen stay up in his first season with the club. However, Cousins was sacked at the start of the 2008 season. New manager Jeff Kenna came in April and Galway's form improved in the latter part of the season, and clean sheets against Finn Harps and UCD, who were both subsequently relegated, helped the Tribesmen stay up.

=== St Patrick's Athletic ===
Rogers followed Jeff Kenna to Dublin side St Patrick's Athletic at the beginning of the 2009 season. Saints goalkeeper Barry Ryan moved in the opposite direction vacating the goalkeepers' jersey. Kenna was sacked after a poor start with the club. Rogers remained at the club for the following season under Pete Mahon and was voted Player of the Month for March 2010 having kept clean sheets in the opening five games if the season. Rogers was part of the League of Ireland XI side that played Manchester United in the opening game at the Aviva Stadium. Rogers was voted by the Ultras group the 'Shed End Invincibles' as their Player of the Year. He re-signed for the Saints on 30 November 2010.

Rogers was part of St. Patrick's European run in 2009, which saw the club reach the 2009–10 UEFA Europa League play-off round keeping clean sheets against Valletta F.C. and FC Krylia Sovetov Samara. Two years later Pats again played 3 rounds in the 2011–12 UEFA Europa League where he kept clean sheets against Íþróttabandalag Vestmannaeyja and FC Shakhter Karagandy.

Gary made his 100th appearance for the Saints against Dundalk on 13 June 2011.

=== Sligo Rovers ===
In December 2011 Rogers signed for Sligo Rovers and has established himself as the club's number 1. He helped the club to a first league title in 35 years in 2012 playing every league game until after the title was secured. 2013 saw him play Champions League football for the first time as Rovers were beaten by Molde of Norway. He kept a career best 26 clean sheets during the season.

=== Dundalk ===
Rogers signed for Dundalk in November 2014. In his first season, he won both the Premier Division and the FAI Cup. He also appeared in the qualifying rounds of the 2015–16 UEFA Champions League as Dundalk went out to BATE Borisov. He was part of the Dundalk side that made Irish footballing history by reaching the play-off round of the 2016–17 UEFA Champions League, where they lost 3–1 on aggregate to Polish side Legia Warsaw, dropping into the group stages of the Europa League as a result. He went on to become a big part of following league campaigns, picking up league medals in 2018 and 2019.

=== Retirement ===
In December 2020, after the 2020 League of Ireland season, Rogers announced his retirement from football after a 21-year career. His last game was against Arsenal in Group B of the 2020–21 UEFA Europa League group stage.

Rogers formerly held the record for most appearances in European competition for an Irish domestic player with 54 appearances, until it was overtaken by Sean Gannon in 2024.

== International career ==
In May 2016, Rogers was added to the Republic of Ireland squad for their friendly against the Netherlands as back-up due to the unavailability of Keiren Westwood and David Forde. He was again called up by Martin O'Neill for a friendly with Oman and a World Cup qualifier against Serbia.

== Coaching career ==
Rogers was ratified as Gaelic football goalkeeping coach of the Meath county team in 2018.

He has also served in similar roles with the Cavan and Westmeath county teams.

In January 2021, he was confirmed as goalkeeping coach of the Monaghan county team.

In June 2021, following his retirement from football, Rogers returned to his former club Drogheda United as a goalkeeping coach.

In August 2023, he returned to the Cavan goalkeeping coach role.

== Personal life ==
Rogers is a native of Navan in County Meath. He grew up playing Gaelic football for his local club, St Ultan's. A three-month ban following an altercation with a referee playing for St Ultan's resulted in him deciding to concentrate on a football career at the age of 17. When his then League of Ireland club, Dublin City, went out of existence in 2006, Rogers returned to playing Gaelic football and appeared in two National Football League games for Meath, before being offered a contract at Galway United and deciding to resume his professional football career. Gary's uncle Liam Devine scored for Dundalk against Linfield and Hibs of Malta in the 1979–80 European Cup.

== Career statistics ==
=== Club ===
Appearances and goals by club, season and competition
Club	Season	League			National cup		League cup		Europe		Other		Total	
Club	Season	Division	Apps	Goals	Apps	Goals	Apps	Goals	Apps	Goals	Apps	Goals	Apps	Goals
St Francis	2000–01	League of Ireland First Division	23	0	1	0	0	0	—		—		24	0
Drogheda United	2001–02	League of Ireland First Division	32	0	2	0	2	0	—		—		36	0
Drogheda United	2002–03	League of Ireland Premier Division	27	0	1	0	0	0	—		—		28	0
Drogheda United	2003	League of Ireland Premier Division	36	0	4	0	2	0	—		—		42	0
Drogheda United	2004	League of Ireland Premier Division	28	0	7	0	2	0	—		—		37	0
Drogheda United	2005	League of Ireland Premier Division	5	0	0	0	0	0	—		—		5	0
Drogheda United	Total		128	0	14	0	6	0	—		—		148	0
Dublin City	2006	League of Ireland Premier Division	16	0	2	0	1	0	—		—		19	0
Bray Wanderers	2006	League of Ireland Premier Division	7	0	0	0	0	0	—		—		7	0
Galway United	2007	League of Ireland Premier Division	31	0	2	0	2	0	—		—		35	0
Galway United	2008	League of Ireland Premier Division	31	0	5	0	2	0	—		—		38	0
Galway United	Total		62	0	7	0	4	0	—		—		73	0
St Patrick's Athletic	2009	League of Ireland Premier Division	27	0	5	0	0	0	6 (Note: Appearances in UEFA Europa League)	0	0 (Note: Appearances in Setanta Sports Cup)	0	38	0
St Patrick's Athletic	2010	League of Ireland Premier Division	35	0	5	0	0	0	—		2	0	42	0
St Patrick's Athletic	2011	League of Ireland Premier Division	34	0	4	0	0	0	6	0	2	0	46	0
St Patrick's Athletic	Total		96	0	14	0	0	0	12	0	4	0	126	0
Sligo Rovers	2012	League of Ireland Premier Division	24	0	1	0	1	0	2	0	2	0	30	0
Sligo Rovers	2013	League of Ireland Premier Division	32	0	5	0	2	0	2 (Note: Appearances in UEFA Champions League)	0	4	0	45	0
Sligo Rovers	2014	League of Ireland Premier Division	27	0	1	0	0	0	4	0	3	0	35	0
Sligo Rovers	Total		83	0	7	0	3	0	8	0	9	0	110	0
Dundalk	2015	League of Ireland Premier Division	31	0	3	0	0	0	2	0	1 (Note: Appearances in President's Cup)	0	37	0
Dundalk	2016	League of Ireland Premier Division	29	0	1	0	0	0	11 (Note: Six appearances in UEFA Champions League, five appearances in UEFA Europa League)	0	0	0	41	0
Dundalk	2017	League of Ireland Premier Division	29	0	6	0	0	0	2	0	1 (Note: Appearances in Leinster Senior Cup)	0	38	0
Dundalk	2018	League of Ireland Premier Division	34	0	4	0	0	0	4	0	1	0	43	0
Dundalk	2019	League of Ireland Premier Division	35	0	3	0	0	0	6 (Note: Four appearances in UEFA Champions League, two appearances in UEFA Europa League)	0	2 (Note: One appearance in President's Cup, one appearance in Champions Cup)	0	43	0
Dundalk	2020	League of Ireland Premier Division	13	0	5	0	—		9 (Note: One appearance in UEFA Champions League, eight appearances in UEFA Europa League)	0	—		27	0
Dundalk	Total		168	0	22	0	0	0	34	0	5	0	228	0
Career total			583	0	67	0	14	0	54	0	18	0	735	0

== Honours ==
Drogheda United

- League of Ireland First Division (1): 2001–02
- FAI Cup (1): 2005

St Patrick's Athletic

- Leinster Senior Cup (1): 2011

Sligo Rovers

- League of Ireland Premier Division (1): 2012
- FAI Cup (1): 2013
- Setanta Sports Cup (1): 2014

Dundalk

- League of Ireland Premier Division (4): 2015, 2016, 2018, 2019
- FAI Cup (3): 2015, 2018, 2020
- League of Ireland Cup (2): 2017, 2019
- President's Cup (2): 2015, 2019
- Leinster Senior Cup (1): 2015
- Champions Cup (1): 2019

== Sources ==
- DUFC A Claret and Blue History by Brian Whelan (2010)
