= 2017 League of Ireland First Division =

League of Ireland First Division
- Season: 2017
- Dates: 24 February – 7 October 2017
- Champions: Waterford
- Promoted: Waterford
- Matches: 112
- Goals: 283 (2.53 per match)
- Top goalscorer: Georgie Kelly (UCD)
- Biggest home win: Longford Town 7-1 Athlone Town (19 August 2017)
- Biggest away win: Athlone Town 1-6 Waterford (2 June 2017)
- Highest scoring: Longford Town 7-1 Athlone Town (19 August 2017)
- Total attendance: 53,342
- Average attendance: 476
- All statistics correct as of 8 April 2017.

The 2017 League of Ireland First Division season is the 33rd season of the League of Ireland First Division. The league began on 24 February 2017 and concludes on 7 October 2017. The 2017 season had no promotion/relegation play-off system like the previous years, only one team would be eligible for promotion whilst three teams would be relegated from the League of Ireland Premier Division in a revamp of the leagues by the FAI.

And returning to the League of Ireland Premier Division for the first time in 10 years was Waterford who won promotion with two games to spare as their 3–0 win over south east rivals Wexford coupled with nearest rivals Cobh Ramblers 3–0 defeat to Cabinteely secured the league title.

== Overview ==
The First Division has 8 teams. Each team played each other four times, twice at home and twice away, for a total of 28 matches in the season.

On 22 December 2016, the FAI announced that the league would be restructured into two 10-team divisions from the 2018 season onwards, one of the recommendations made in the 2015 Conroy Report. This meant the cancellation of the promotion/relegation playoff and relegation at the end of the 2017 season of 3 teams from the Premier Division, with only the champions of the First Division promoted in return.

== Teams ==
Locations of the First Division teams
Locations of Dublin First Division teams

=== Stadia and locations ===
Team	Location	Stadium
Athlone Town	Athlone	Athlone Town Stadium
Cabinteely	Cabinteely	Stradbrook Road
Cobh Ramblers	Cobh	St. Colman's Park
Longford Town	Longford	City Calling Stadium
Shelbourne	Drumcondra	Tolka Park
UCD	Belfield	UCD Bowl
Waterford	Waterford	Waterford RSC
Wexford	Crossabeg	Ferrycarrig Park

=== Personnel and kits ===
Note: Flags indicate national team as has been defined under FIFA eligibility rules. Players may hold more than one non-FIFA nationality.

Team	Manager	Captain	Kit manufacturer	Shirt sponsor
Athlone Town	(Republic of Ireland) Roddy Collins	(Republic of Ireland) Niall Scullion	Nike	Nitro Sports
Cabinteely	(Republic of Ireland) Pat Devlin	(Republic of Ireland) Daire Doyle	Umbro	Dublin School of Grinds
Cobh Ramblers	(Republic of Ireland) Stephen Henderson	(England) Paul Hunt	Legea	Tony & William O'Shea Fuels Rushbrooke
Longford Town	(Republic of Ireland) Neale Fenn	(Republic of Ireland) Kevin O'Connor	Legea	City Calling
Shelbourne	(Republic of Ireland) Owen Heary	(Republic of Ireland) Dean Delaney	Macron	abbeyseals.ie
UCD	(Republic of Ireland) Collie O'Neill	(Republic of Ireland) Gary O'Neill	O'Neills	O'Neills
Waterford	(Republic of Ireland) Alan Reynolds	(Republic of Ireland) Kenny Browne	Umbro	21 Bet
Wexford	(Republic of Ireland) Damian Locke	(Republic of Ireland) Craig McCabe	Bodibro	Premier Tickets

== League table ==
Pos	Team	Pld	W	D	L	GF	GA	GD	Pts	Promotion
1	Waterford (C, P)	28	17	8	3	47	17	+30	59	Promotion to League of Ireland Premier Division
2	Cobh Ramblers	28	16	3	9	37	28	+9	51	
3	UCD	28	13	8	7	42	23	+19	47	
4	Shelbourne	28	11	7	10	37	32	+5	40	
5	Longford Town	28	10	8	10	34	26	+8	38	
6	Cabinteely	28	10	8	10	41	37	+4	38	
7	Wexford	28	4	7	17	16	41	−25	19	
8	Athlone Town	28	4	5	19	29	79	−50	17	

Source: SSE Airtricity League, Soccerway, extratime.ie
Rules for classification: 1) Points; 2) Goal difference; 3) Goals scored.
(C) Champions; (P) Promoted

== Results ==
=== Matches 1–14 ===
Teams play each other twice (once at home, once away).

Home \ Away	ATH	CAB	COB	LON	SHE	UCD	WAT	WEX
Athlone Town	—	3–3	2–1	0–3	1–4	0–2	1–0	1–0
Cabinteely	2–0	—	4–1	0–0	0–1	0–1	0–0	2–0
Cobh Ramblers	5–1	2–0	—	2–0	1–1	1–0	0–0	1–1
Longford Town	3–1 (Note: In September 2017 the FAI banned two Athlone players for 12 months after a UEFA investigation found "clear and overwhelming betting evidence" of fixing of their 29 April match against Longford.)	0–2	1–3	—	3–1	0–1	0–0	5–0
Shelbourne	2–1	1–4	0–1	0–0	—	0–1	2–2	2–0
UCD	4–1	2–2	0–1	2–0	4–0	—	0–2	2–0
Waterford	2–1	3–0	2–1	1–0	1–0	1–1	—	2–0
Wexford	1–2	1–1	1–2	0–0	1–0	1–1	0–1	—

Updated to match(es) played on 27 May 2017. Source: SSE Airtricity League
Legend: Blue = home team win; Yellow = draw; Red = away team win.

=== Matches 15–28 ===
Teams play each other twice (once at home, once away).

Home \ Away	ATH	CAB	COB	LON	SHE	UCD	WAT	WEX
Athlone Town	—	1–1	0–1	2–2	1–3	0–4	1–6	1–1
Cabinteely	6–2	—	2–1	0–2	1–0	3–3	1–1	0–1
Cobh Ramblers	3–1	0–3	—	2–0	0–1	1–0	2–1	1–0
Longford Town	7–1	1–0	2–1	—	1–3	1–1	0–1	1–0
Shelbourne	4–1	3–1	0–1	0–0	—	1–1	1–1	1–2
UCD	4–0	2–3	1–0	0–0	1–2	—	3–2	1–0
Waterford	3–1	3–0	4–0	1–0	1–1	1–0	—	2–1
Wexford	2–2	2–0	0–2	1–2	0–3	0–0	0–3	—

Updated to match(es) played on 7 October 2017. Source: SSE Airtricity League
Legend: Blue = home team win; Yellow = draw; Red = away team win.

== Top scorers ==
Rank	Player	Club	Goals
1	(Republic of Ireland) Georgie Kelly	UCD	17
2	(Republic of Ireland) Kieran Marty Waters	Cabinteely	15
3	(Republic of Ireland) Mark O'Sullivan	Waterford	12
4	(Northern Ireland) David McDaid	Waterford	11
5	(Republic of Ireland) Joe Doyle	Cabinteely	10
6	(Republic of Ireland) David O'Sullivan	Longford Town	9
7	(Republic of Ireland) James English	Shelbourne	8
8	(Republic of Ireland) Adam Evans	Shelbourne	8
9	(Republic of Ireland) Enda Curran	Longford Town/Athlone Town	7
10	(Republic of Ireland) Jason McClelland	UCD	7

== Awards ==
The PFAI First Division player of the year nominees were Waterford striker David McDaid, Cabinteely midfielder Kieran Marty Waters and UCD striker Georgie Kelly.

== PFAI First Division Team of Year ==

The PFAI First Division Team of the Year was:

- Goalkeeper: Niall Corbett (UCD)
- Defence: Daniel O'Reilly (Longford Town), Kenny Browne (Waterford), Chris McCarthy (Cobh Ramblers), Evan Osam (UCD)
- Midfield: Garry Comerford (Waterford), Greg Sloggett (UCD), Kirean Marty Waters (Cabinteely), Derek Daly (Waterford)
- Attack: David McDaid (Waterford), Georgie Kelly (UCD)

== See also ==
- 2017 League of Ireland Premier Division
- 2017 League of Ireland Cup
