= 2019 President of Ireland's Cup =

- Event: President's Cup
Cork City	Dundalk
1	2
- Date: 9 February 2019
- Venue: Turners Cross, Cork
- Referee: Robert Hennessy
- Attendance: 2,777

The 2019 President's Cup was the sixth President's Cup contested for. The match was played between the champions of 2018 League of Ireland Premier Division and 2018 FAI Cup, Dundalk, and Cork City who were runners-up in both of those competitions. It took place on 9 February 2019, at Turners Cross and was won by Dundalk.

Dundalk won the game 2–1 to win their second President's Cup.

== Match ==
=== Summary ===
Cork were looking for a fourth consecutive President's Cup victory. It was the first competitive game for new Dundalk manager Vinny Perth since taking over from Stephen Kenny. In the 36th minute Dane Massey put Dundalk ahead with a powerful header from six yards out after a corner form the right. In first-half injury time Patrick Hoban made it 2–0 with a header to the right corner from six yards out after a cross from Michael Duffy on the left. Kevin O'Connor pulled one back for Cork in the 65th minute with a free-kick into the top left corner of the net.

=== Details ===
9 February 2019
17:30 GMT (UTC±00:00)

Cork City	1–2	Dundalk
K. O'Connor 65'	Report	36' Massey; 45+1' Hoban

Turners Cross
Attendance: 2,777
Referee: Robert Hennessy

Cork City	Dundalk

GK	1	(Republic of Ireland) Mark McNulty
DF	4	(Republic of Ireland) Sean McLoughlin
DF	20	(Republic of Ireland) Shane Griffin
DF	21	(Republic of Ireland) Conor McCarthy
DF	26	(Republic of Ireland) Dan Casey
MF	6	(Republic of Ireland) Gearóid Morrissey
MF	8	(Republic of Ireland) Conor McCormack		(substituted off) 62'
MF	10	(Republic of Ireland) Garry Buckley (c)	(yellow card) 70'
MF	11	(Republic of Ireland) Daire O'Connor
FW	9	(Republic of Ireland) Graham Cummins
FW	22	(Republic of Ireland) James Tilley	(yellow card) 70'
Substitutes:
GK	23	(Republic of Ireland) Tadhg Ryan
DF	2	(Republic of Ireland) Colm Horgan
DF	3	(Republic of Ireland) Alan Bennett
DF	14	(Republic of Ireland) Ronan Hurley
MF	25	(Republic of Ireland) Kevin O'Connor	66'	(substituted in) 62'
FW	7	(Republic of Ireland) Daragh Rainsford
FW	24	(Republic of Ireland) Cian Murphy
Manager:
(Republic of Ireland) John Caulfield

GK	1	(Republic of Ireland) Gary Rogers
DF	2	(Republic of Ireland) Sean Gannon
DF	3	(Republic of Ireland) Brian Gartland (c)
DF	14	(Republic of Ireland) Dane Massey	36'
DF	4	(Republic of Ireland) Seán Hoare
MF	5	(Republic of Ireland) Chris Shields	(yellow card) 72'
MF	7	(Republic of Ireland) Michael Duffy
MF	8	(Republic of Ireland) John Mountney
FW	9	(Republic of Ireland) Patrick Hoban	45+1'	(substituted off) 83'
MF	11	(Republic of Ireland) Patrick McEleney		(substituted off) 68'
MF	18	(Republic of Ireland) Robbie Benson		(substituted off) 90+1'
Substitutes:
GK	20	(Republic of Ireland) Aaron McCarey
DF	15	(Republic of Ireland) Stephen Folan
DF	21	(Republic of Ireland) Daniel Cleary
DF	33	(Republic of Ireland) Dean Jarvis		(substituted in) 90+1'
MF	16	(Republic of Ireland) Sean Murray		(substituted in) 68'
MF	27	(Republic of Ireland) Daniel Kelly
FW	12	(Republic of Ireland) Georgie Kelly		(substituted in) 83'
Manager:
(Republic of Ireland) Vinny Perth

Assistant referees:
Dermot Broughton
Trevor Cotter
Fourth official:
Ray Matthews

== See also ==
- 2019 FAI Cup
- 2019 League of Ireland Premier Division
