= 2018 FAI Cup final =

- Event: 2018 FAI Cup
Cork City	Dundalk
1	2
- Date: 4 November 2018
- Venue: Aviva Stadium, Dublin
- Referee: Neil Doyle
- Attendance: 30,412

The 2018 FAI Cup final was the final match of the 2018 FAI Cup, the national association football cup of the Republic of Ireland. The match took place on Sunday 4 November 2018 at the Aviva Stadium in Dublin, and was contested by Cork City and Dundalk.

The match was a repeat of the 2015, 2016, and 2017 finals.

The match was broadcast live on RTÉ Two and RTÉ Two HD in Ireland, and via the RTÉ Player worldwide with commentary from George Hamilton.

The crowd of 30,412, was the biggest Cup final attendance since the 36,101 which saw the 2010 final, the first at the Aviva Stadium.

== Match ==
=== Summary ===
Dundalk opened the scoring in the 19th minute when Seán Hoare headed powerfully to the net from six yards out after a corner from the left by Michael Duffy. Two minutes later Cork were awarded a penalty when Hoare clumsily fouled Karl Sheppard from behind in the penalty area. Kieran Sadlier scored the penalty shooting to the right which went under the goalkeeper to make it 1-1. Patrick McEleney got the winning goal for Dundalk in the 73rd minute when he connected with a cross form the right from Sean Gannon to head into the net from seven yards out. With this win, Dundalk completed the double of league and cup for the fourth time. It was also their 11th FAI Cup win.

=== Details ===
4 November 2018	Cork City	1–2	Dundalk	Aviva Stadium
16:40	Kieran Sadlier 21' (pen.)	Report	Seán Hoare 19'; Patrick McEleney 73'	Attendance: 30,412; Referee: Neil Doyle
