= Seán Hoare =

Irish footballer (born 1994)

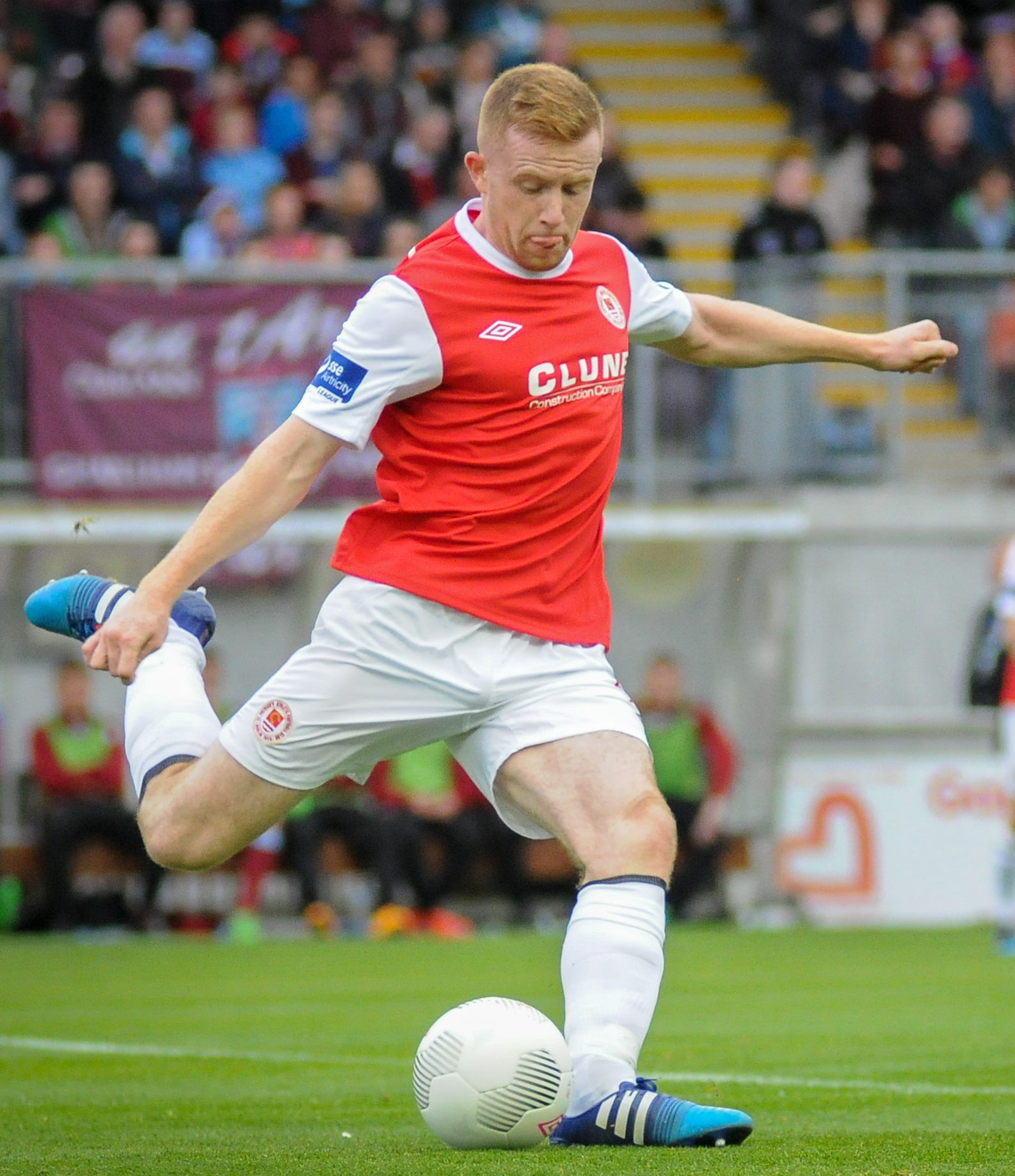
- Hoare in the 2015 League Cup Final

Personal information
- Full name: Seán Patrick Hoare
- Date of birth: 15 March 1994 (age 32)
- Place of birth: Castleknock, Dublin, Ireland
- Position: Centre back

Team information
- Current team: St Patrick's Athletic
- Number: 2

Youth career
- Castleknock Celtic
- Home Farm
- Shelbourne
- 2012–2013: St Patrick's Athletic

Senior career*
Years	Team	Apps	(Gls)
2012–2016	St Patrick's Athletic	65	(3)
2017–2020	Dundalk	82	(6)
2021–2024	Shamrock Rovers	93	(7)
2025–	St Patrick's Athletic	44	(2)

International career
2014–2016	Republic of Ireland U21	5	(0)
- * Club domestic league appearances and goals as of 01:32, 24 October 2026 (UTC)

Seán Patrick Hoare (born 15 March 1994) is an Irish professional footballer who plays as a centre back for League of Ireland Premier Division club St Patrick's Athletic.

== Club career ==
=== St Patrick's Athletic ===
==== Under 19s ====
Hoare signed with St Patrick's Athletic's Under 19s in the summer of 2012. He signed on to the scholarship scheme between NUI Maynooth and St Patrick's Athletic. Hoare's first involvement with the first team squad came on 1 October 2012 when he was an unused substitute in a 5–0 win over UCD.

==== 2013 season ====
Hoare made his first team debut on 4 June 2013 in a 2–0 AET win over Longford Town in the Leinster Senior Cup Quarter-final at Richmond Park. His next appearance was a Dublin derby away to Shamrock Rovers in the quarter-final of the League Cup. Hoare also played in the Leinster Senior Cup Semi-final win away to Shelbourne and also in the final at Richmond Park as Pats were runners up to Shamrock Rovers. Although he didn't make any League of Ireland appearances, manager Liam Buckley ensured all players in the squad received winners medals, as the club lifted their ninth league title on 18 October 2013 against Derry City.

==== Collingwood Cup ====
As part of the scholarship scheme between Pats and Maynooth University Hoare played for the university's football team as well as his club's under 19 side. St Patrick's Athletic captain Ger O'Brien was also appointed as manager of university's football side, with Pats goalkeeper Brendan Clarke brought in as his assistant before the annual football competition between universities and colleges the 2014 Collingwood Cup. O'Brien organised a friendly against Pats' first team and Hoare impressed manager Liam Buckley as Maynooth lost 2–1. Hoare was made captain of the college side and scored the winner as they knocked out tournament favourites UCD in the quarter-final by a 2–1 scoreline. After knocking UCC in the semi-final, Hoare's Maynooth side would face NUI Galway in the final at the UCD Bowl, which was broadcast live on Setanta Sports. Hoare captained his side to a 2–1 victory to win Maynooth's first ever Collingwood Cup and he was named as Player of the Tournament after the game.

==== 2014 season ====
Hoare was involved in the first team's pre-season training for the first time, in late January/early February 2014, taking part in the teams friendly games before playing in the Collingwood Cup with Maynooth University. Hoare signed his first professional contract and was given the squad number 20 before the season started. His first appearance of the season was a 2–0 defeat to Sligo Rovers. On 28 March 2014, as Pats were away to Derry City, Ken Oman picked up a groin injury in the 29th minute and was replaced by Hoare who was making his League of Ireland debut. He marked the previous season's top goalscorer Rory Patterson and contributed towards a clean sheet as the Saints drew 0–0. After a poor 4–1 defeat at home to Dundalk, Derek Foran was replaced by Hoare for the away trip to Bray Wanderers and his performance was praised by both sets of supporters and the media after the game. Hoare maintained his place at centre back alongside Kenny Browne for the visit of Shamrock Rovers and put in a Man-of-the-match performance as Pats beat their arch rivals 1–0, earning Hoare huge praise from supporters on social media and making it into many website's Team of the Week section. Following this performance, Hoare became a mainstay in the starting eleven alongside Browne, even when Ken Oman and Derek Foran return from injury, such was the defensive solidity of the Saints back five of Brendan Clarke, Ger O'Brien, Hoare, Browne and Ian Bermingham. On 30 May 2014, Hoare scored his first goal for Pats in a 5–2 win over Derry City at Richmond Park, when he headed a Killian Brennan freekick into the top right corner in the 48th minute. Hoare picked up an ankle injury on 6 June in a 3–0 win over St. Patrick's CY in the FAI Cup This injury would rule him out of the next six competitive games but Hoare made his comeback on 23 July when he came on from the bench to replace the injured Ger O'Brien at right back against Legia Warsaw in the Champions League, his debut in European competitions. Hoare returned to the starting eleven three days later for the trip to Athlone Town and helped his side to a clean sheet as well as scoring the second goal to secure a 2–0 win. On 5 October 2014, Hoare scored in the FAI Cup Semi-final at home to Finn Harps, when he headed home from a corner to restore Pats' lead in the 37th minute before they ran out 6–1 winners to book a place in the final at the Aviva Stadium. Hoare was a part of the starting eleven that wrote themselves into St Patrick's Athletic history by beating Derry City 2–0 to end the club's hoodoo by winning the FAI Cup for the first time in 53 years, on 2 November 2014 at the Aviva Stadium in front of a crowd of just over 17,000. As well as being called up to the Republic of Ireland under-21s, He was voted the St Patrick's Athletic Young Player of the Year following an excellent 2014 season. In November 2014, Hoare impressed on trial with Premier League side Hull City.

==== 2015 season ====
It was announced on 15 January 2015 that Hoare changed his squad number again, this time to first XI number, number 5. Amidst from interest in Hoare from such English clubs as Hull City, MK Dons and Millwall, St Patrick's Athletic held onto their man as the English transfer window closed on 2 February. Hoare was given the honour of captaining the Republic of Ireland under-21s against the Republic of Ireland Amateur Internationals on 21 February 2015. He made his first President's Cup appearance on 28 February as the Saints finished runners up following a 2–1 loss to Dundalk at Oriel Park. Hoare went on to feature in St Pats' League Cup success, beating Galway United on penalties in the final.

==== 2016 season ====
The 2016 season was a disappointing one for St Pat's and Hoare, as they disappointingly failed to secure qualification for Europe for the first time since 2009. However they did retain the League Cup, with Hoare playing the full 90 minutes in a 4–1 win over Limerick in the final. He also featured in all four of the Saints' Europa League qualifiers, as they knocked out Jeunesse Esch of Luxembourg, before being narrowly beaten by Dinamo Minsk of Belarus.

=== Dundalk ===
On 12 December 2016, Hoare signed for league Champions Dundalk ahead of the 2017 season. Hoare scored six goals in 82 league appearances to help win the two Premier Division titles in 2018 and 2019. He also helped Dundalk win the 2019 League of Ireland Cup and the 2018 FAI Cup. In the 2020–21 UEFA Europa League third qualifying round, he scored in the penalty shoot-out against Sheriff Tiraspol helping his side qualify for the playoffs. He featured regularly for Dundalk in the 2020–21 UEFA Europa League group stage, scoring in the final group game in a 4–2 loss to Arsenal at the Aviva Stadium. On 6 December 2020, He scored in the 111 minute of extra time in the 2020 FAI Cup Final in a 4–2 win over Shamrock Rovers at the Aviva Stadium.

=== Shamrock Rovers ===
On 14 December 2020, Hoare signed for Shamrock Rovers ahead of the 2021 season. He scored 8 goals in 129 appearances during his 4 seasons at the club, in which he helped them win 3 league titles and also saw him feature in the group stages of the UEFA Conference League in both 2022 and 2024.

=== Return to St Patrick's Athletic ===
==== 2025 season ====
On 2 January 2025, it was announced that Hoare had returned to his first senior club St Patrick's Athletic on a multi-year contract. After suffering an injury in his side's final pre-season game, he missed a number of the early weeks season through injury, having to wait until 28 March 2025 for his second league debut for the club, in what was also his 100th appearance for them in all competitions, when he replaced Tom Grivosti from the bench in a 2–1 win away to Waterford.

==== 2026 season ====
Having missed the majority of 2025 through injury, Hoare made his first league start since May 2025 on 27 February 2026, scoring a header to put his side 2–0 up in an eventual 4–0 win over Dundalk at Richmond Park. On 24 July 2026, Hoare scored his second goal of the season, again against his former club Dundalk, in a 1–1 draw that put his side second in the table. He was voted as the club's Player of the Month for July 2026.

== International career ==
Hoare was called up to the Republic of Ireland under-21 team for the first time, on 5 November 2014 by manager Noel King for the friendlies against United States under-21 and Russia under-21, following an excellent debut season in the League of Ireland. He made his debut for the under-21s on 17 November 2014 when he came on as a substitute in the 73rd minute against Russia under-21 in a 2–2 draw at the Marbella football centre. His second appearance came on 21 February 2015 when he captained the side against the Republic of Ireland Amateur Internationals.

== Career statistics ==
As of match played 23 October 2026

Appearances and goals by club, season and competition
Club	Season	League			FAI Cup		League of Ireland Cup		Europe		Other		Total	
Club	Season	Division	Apps	Goals	Apps	Goals	Apps	Goals	Apps	Goals	Apps	Goals	Apps	Goals
St Patrick's Athletic	2012	LOI Premier Division	0	0	0	0	0	0	0 (Note: Appearances in the UEFA Europa League)	0	0 (Note: Appearances in the Leinster Senior Cup)	0	0	0
St Patrick's Athletic	2013	LOI Premier Division	0	0	0	0	1	0	0	0	3	0	4	0
St Patrick's Athletic	2014	LOI Premier Division	22	2	6	1	1	0	1 (Note: Appearances in UEFA Champions League)	0	4 (Note: 2 appearances in the Leinster Senior Cup; 2 appearances in the Setanta Sports Cup)	0	34	3
St Patrick's Athletic	2015	LOI Premier Division	22	0	2	0	2	0	1	0	2 (Note: 1 appearance in the Leinster Senior Cup; one appearance in the President of Ireland's Cup)	0	29	0
St Patrick's Athletic	2016	LOI Premier Division	21	1	4	0	2	0	4	0	0	0	31	1
St Patrick's Athletic	Total		65	3	12	1	6	0	6	0	9	0	98	4
Dundalk	2017	LOI Premier Division	17	0	4	1	3	0	0	0	1	0	25	1
Dundalk	2018	LOI Premier Division	27	2	3	1	1	0	4	0	1 (Note: Appearance in the President of Ireland's Cup)	0	36	3
Dundalk	2019	LOI Premier Division	28	4	5	0	1	0	5 (Note: 4 appearances in the UEFA Champions League; 1 appearance in the UEFA Europa League)	0	2 (Note: 1 appearance in the President of Ireland's Cup; 1 appearance in the Champions Cup)	0	41	4
Dundalk	2020	LOI Premier Division	10	0	4	2	–		9 (Note: 1 appearance in the UEFA Champions League; 8 appearances, 1 goal in the UEFA Europa League)	1	–		23	3
Dundalk	Total		82	6	16	4	5	0	18	1	4	0	125	11
Shamrock Rovers	2021	LOI Premier Division	26	2	0	0	–		5 (Note: 2 appearances in the UEFA Champions League; 3 appearances in the UEFA Europa Conference League)	0	1	0	32	2
Shamrock Rovers	2022	LOI Premier Division	33	2	3	1	–		13 (Note: 4 appearances in the UEFA Champions League; 4 appearances in the UEFA Europa League; 5 appearances in the UEFA Europa Conference League)	0	1	0	50	3
Shamrock Rovers	2023	LOI Premier Division	22	1	1	0	–		4 (Note: 2 appearances in the UEFA Champions League; 2 appearances in the UEFA Europa Conference League)	0	0	0	27	1
Shamrock Rovers	2024	LOI Premier Division	12	2	0	0	–		7 (Note: 4 appearances in the UEFA Champions League; 4 appearances in the UEFA Europa League)	0	1	0	20	2
Shamrock Rovers	Total		93	7	4	1	–		29	0	3	0	129	8
St Patrick's Athletic	2025	LOI Premier Division	15	0	0	0	–		0 (Note: Appearances in the UEFA Conference League)	0	2	0	17	0
St Patrick's Athletic	2026	LOI Premier Division	29	2	3	0	—		—		0	0	32	2
St Patrick's Athletic	Total		44	2	3	0	–		0	0	2	0	49	2
Career total			284	18	35	6	11	0	53	1	18	0	401	25

== Honours ==
St Patrick's Athletic

- League of Ireland Premier Division: 2013
- FAI Cup: 2014
- League of Ireland Cup: 2015, 2016
- President of Ireland's Cup: 2014
- Leinster Senior Cup: 2013–14

Dundalk

- League of Ireland Premier Division: 2018, 2019
- FAI Cup: 2018, 2020
- League of Ireland Cup: 2017, 2019
- President of Ireland's Cup: 2019
- Champions Cup: 2019

Shamrock Rovers

- League of Ireland Premier Division: 2021, 2022, 2023
- President of Ireland's Cup: 2022, 2024

NUI Maynooth

- Collingwood Cup: 2014

Individual

- PFAI Team of the Year: 2018, 2019
- St Patrick's Athletic Young Player of the Year: 2014
- Collingwood Cup Player of the Tournament: 2014
