= Dean Jarvis =

Northern Irish footballer

Personal information
- Date of birth: 1 June 1992 (age 34)
- Place of birth: Derry, Northern Ireland
- Position: Left back

Team information
- Current team: Coleraine
- Number: 3

Youth career
- 2006–2008: Ballymoor
- 2008–2009: Derry City
- 2009–2010: Aberdeen

Senior career*
Years	Team	Apps	(Gls)
2010–2011	Aberdeen	1	(0)
2011–2013	Institute	42	(2)
2013–2018	Derry City	119	(5)
2018–2019	Dundalk	38	(1)
2020–2022	Larne	66	(1)
2022–	Coleraine	130	(6)

International career
2007	Northern Ireland U16	3	(0)
2008	Northern Ireland U17	3	(0)
2009	Northern Ireland U19	7	(0)
2010	Northern Ireland U21	5	(0)
- * Club domestic league appearances and goals as of 29 April 2026

Dean Jarvis (born 1 June 1992) is a Northern Irish footballer who plays for Coleraine as a left back.

== Club career ==
After playing youth football in his native Northern Ireland for Ballymoor and Derry City, Jarvis made his professional debut for Aberdeen in the Scottish Premier League on 2 October 2010. It remained his only appearance for the club, as Jarvis was released in April 2011.

He returned to his native Northern Ireland, signing for Institute in August 2011.

Jarvis re-signed for his hometown club Derry City in July 2013 after a trial with York City.

Following the end of his contract with Derry City, he moved on to Dundalk in January 2018, after signing in November 2017. He left Dundalk at the end of the 2019 season.

In December 2019 it was announced he would sign for Larne in January 2020.

Jarvis signed for Coleraine in June 2022.

== International career ==
Jarvis has represented Northern Ireland at youth international level.

== Honours ==
Dundalk

- League of Ireland Premier Division: 2018, 2019
- FAI Cup: 2018
- League of Ireland Cup: 2019
- President's Cup: 2019
- Champion's Cup: 2019

Larne

- County Antrim Shield: 2020–21, 2021-22
