= 2020 FAI Cup final =

- Event: 2020 FAI Cup
Shamrock Rovers	Dundalk
2	4
- After extra time
- Date: 6 December 2020
- Venue: Aviva Stadium, Dublin
- Referee: Rob Harvey
- Attendance: 0
- Weather: Fog −1 °C (30 °F)

The 2020 FAI Cup final, known as the 2020 Extra.ie FAI Cup final for sponsorship reasons, was the final match of the 2020 FAI Cup, the national association football cup of the Republic of Ireland. The match took place on Sunday 6 December 2020 at the Aviva Stadium in Dublin, and was contested by defending champions Shamrock Rovers and Dundalk. The match was a repeat of the 2019 Final.

The match was broadcast live on RTÉ Two and RTÉ Two HD in the Republic of Ireland, and via the RTÉ Player worldwide with commentary from George Hamilton and Pat Fenlon.

Dundalk won the game 4-2 after extra-time with a hat-trick from David McMillan.

== Match summary ==
6 December 2020
18:40

Shamrock Rovers	2–4 (a.e.t.)	Dundalk
Dylan Watts (yellow card) 16'; Joey O'Brien (yellow card) 45+3'; Aaron Greene 49'; Liam Scales (yellow card) 71'; Roberto Lopes 74'; Graham Burke (yellow card) 98'	Report	Greg Sloggett (yellow card) 64'; David McMillan 69', 72' (pen.), 117'; Chris Shields (yellow card) 97'; Brian Gartland (yellow card) 105'; Seán Hoare 111'

Aviva Stadium, Ballsbridge, Dublin
Attendance: 0
Referee: Rob Harvey
