= Georgie Kelly =

Irish footballer (born 1996)

George Kelly
Personal information
- Full name: George Martin Kelly
- Date of birth: 12 November 1996 (age 30)
- Place of birth: County Donegal, Ireland
- Height: 1.88 m (6 ft 2 in)
- Position: Forward

Team information
- Current team: Carlisle United
- Number: 9

Youth career
- Derry City

Senior career*
Years	Team	Apps	(Gls)
2015	Derry City	3	(0)
2016–2018	UCD	68	(37)
2018–2020	Dundalk	36	(8)
2020	→ St Patrick's Athletic (loan)	12	(3)
2021	Bohemians	31	(21)
2022–2024	Rotherham United	48	(6)
2024–	Carlisle United	62	(20)
- * Club domestic league appearances and goals as of 19:21, 13 August 2026 (UTC)

George Martin Kelly (born 12 November 1996) is an Irish professional footballer who plays as a forward for National League club Carlisle United.

== Career ==
=== UCD ===
Kelly joined UCD after a brief stint with Derry City. In 2017, Kelly scored a hat-trick against, Athlone Town, securing the top scorer title for the season.Kelly played a crucial role, as UCD returned to the top flight of Irish football. Scoring 15 times in just 17, before departing for dundalk mid season.

=== Dundalk ===
After two and a half seasons in the First Division, Kelly signed with Premier Division club, Dundalk. He played his first European match against Estonian side, FCI Levadia Tallinn in the 2018–19 UEFA Europa League qualifying rounds. He ended the 2018 season with the rare double of First Division (for UCD) and Premier Division (for Dundalk) winner's medals, and also won the FAI Cup.

During the 2019 season, Kelly and Dundalk narrowly missed out on the treble, following a penalty shootout in the 2019 FAI Cup Final against Shamrock Rovers.

==== Loan to St Patrick's Athletic ====
Kelly was loaned to St Patrick's Athletic for the remainder of the 2020 season on 28 July 2020. On 7 August 2020, he scored his first goals for the club, netting a brace as his side beat Finn Harps 2–0 at Richmond Park. His only other goal for the club came in a 3–2 loss away to Finn Harps on 29 October 2020.

=== Bohemians ===
On 22 December 2020, Kelly signed for Bohemians for the 2021 season. Kelly scored his first Premier Division hat-trick in a 5–1 victory against Dundalk. Following a successful first season at the club, Kelly was the league's top scorer with 21 goals including a late equaliser against Sligo Rovers in the final game of the season. He was later named in the team of the year. He helped the club reach the 2021 FAI Cup Final where they eventually lost to his former club, St Patrick's Athletic.

=== Rotherham United ===
In January 2022 he signed for EFL League One club Rotherham United. On 30 April 2022, Kelly scored the second goal in a 2–0 win for Rotherham over Gillingham which secured promotion to the Championship, having come on as a substitute 10 minutes beforehand to make his first team debut. He went on to score a total of 6 goals for the club in 51 appearances.

=== Carlisle United ===
On 1 February 2024, Kelly signed for EFL League One club Carlisle United for an undisclosed fee, on a three-and-a-half-year deal. He failed to score in 7 appearances by the end of his first half-season with the club as they were relegated to EFL League Two.

== Career statistics ==
As of match played on 8 August 2026

Appearances and goals by club, season and competition
Club	Season	League			National cup		League cup		Europe		Other		Total	
Club	Season	Division	Apps	Goals	Apps	Goals	Apps	Goals	Apps	Goals	Apps	Goals	Apps	Goals
Derry City	2015	LOI Premier Division	3	0	0	0	1	0	0	0	—		4	0
UCD	2016	LOI First Division	25	6	1	0	1	0	—		3 (Note: Appearances in Leinster Senior Cup)	1	30	7
UCD	2017	LOI First Division	26	17	1	0	1	0	—		2	0	30	17
UCD	2018	LOI First Division	17	14	—		1	0	—		0	0	18	14
UCD	Total		68	37	2	0	3	0	—		5	1	78	38
Dundalk	2018	LOI Premier Division	7	0	3	2	—		1 (Note: Appearances in UEFA Europa League)	0	1	0	12	2
Dundalk	2019	LOI Premier Division	27	8	5	2	4	2	3 (Note: Two appearances in UEFA Champions League; one appearance in UEFA Europa League)	0	4 (Note: One appearance in President of Ireland's Cup; one appearance in Leinster Senior Cup; two appearances, two goals in Champions Cup)	2	43	14
Dundalk	2020	LOI Premier Division	2	0	—		—		—		—		2	0
Dundalk	Total		36	8	8	4	4	2	4	0	5	2	57	16
St Patrick's Athletic (loan)	2020	LOI Premier Division	12	3	1	0	—		—		—		13	3
Bohemians	2021	LOI Premier Division	31	21	3	1	—		6 (Note: Appearances in UEFA Europa Conference League)	4	—		40	26
Rotherham United	2021–22	League One	1	1	—		—		—		0	0	1	1
Rotherham United	2022–23	Championship	29	4	0	0	2	0	—		—		31	4
Rotherham United	2023–24	Championship	18	1	0	0	1	0	—		—		19	1
Rotherham United	Total		48	6	0	0	3	0	—		0	0	51	6
Carlisle United	2023–24	League One	7	0	—		—		—		—		7	0
Carlisle United	2024–25	League Two	18	5	0	0	0	0	—		0	0	18	5
Carlisle United	2025–26	National League	36	13	2	0	0	0	—		1 (Note: Appearance in FA Trophy)	0	39	13
Carlisle United	2026–27	National League	6	2	0	0	0	0	—		0	0	1	2
Carlisle United	Total		62	20	2	0	0	0	—		1	0	65	20
Career total			260	95	16	5	11	2	10	4	11	3	308	109

== Honours ==
Dundalk

- League of Ireland Premier Division: 2018, 2019
- FAI Cup: 2018
- League of Ireland Cup: 2019
- Champions Cup: 2019

Rotherham United

- EFL Trophy: 2021–22

Individual

- PFAI Players' Player of the Year: 2021
- FAI League Player of the Year: 2021
- League of Ireland Premier Division top scorer: 2021
- League of Ireland First Division top scorer: 2017
