= Sean Gannon (footballer) =

Irish footballer (born 1991)

Seán Gannon
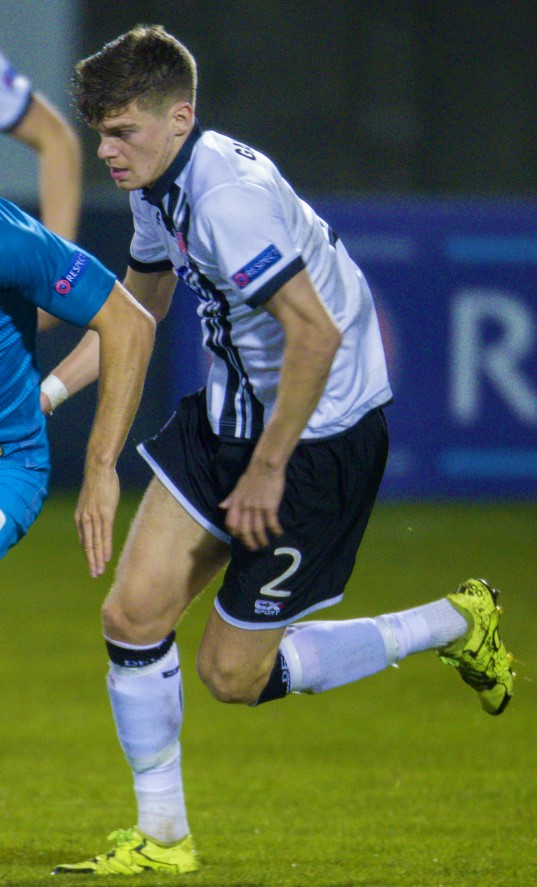
- Gannon playing against Zenit Saint Petersburg in the 2016–17 Europa League

Personal information
- Full name: Seán Gannon
- Date of birth: 11 July 1991 (age 35)
- Place of birth: Dublin, Ireland
- Position: Right back

Youth career
- 1997–2004: Cambridge Boys
- 2004–2008: Home Farm
- 2008–2010: St Kevin's Boys
- 2010: Shamrock Rovers

Senior career*
Years	Team	Apps	(Gls)
2011–2012	Shamrock Rovers	9	(0)
2013	St Patrick's Athletic	13	(0)
2014–2020	Dundalk	190	(7)
2021–2023	Shamrock Rovers	70	(3)
2024–2026	Shelbourne	79	(0)
- * Club domestic league appearances and goals as of 19:13, 10 November 2026 (UTC)

Sean Gannon (born 11 July 1991) is an Irish professional footballer who plays as a defender, most recently for Shelbourne in the League of Ireland Premier Division. He previously played for Shamrock Rovers (over 2 spells), St Patrick's Athletic, and Dundalk. He has won a record 11 League of Ireland Premier Division winners medals. Gannon has featured in European competition group stage/league phase for Dundalk, Shamrock Rovers, and Shelbourne. He has made 64 appearances in European competition – a record for a League of Ireland player.

== Early life ==
Gannon grew up in Ringsend and regularly attended Republic of Ireland matches with his father at the nearby Lansdowne Road. He was a ball boy in several games, most notably a 1–1 draw with Portugal in the 2002 World Cup qualifiers. In his teenage years, Gannon played for schoolboy clubs Cambridge Boys, Home Farm and St Kevin's Boys, before signing for Shamrock Rovers in the summer of 2010. He played in the club's A Championship team and was part of their under-20s title-winning side under Andrew Myler. While appearing for the Shamrock Rovers youth teams, Gannon successfully graduated from a joint FÁS/FAI Youth Soccer Training course in Irishtown Stadium, giving him exposure to a year of full-time training and preparing him for professional football.

== Professional career ==
=== Shamrock Rovers ===
Gannon made his senior debut for Shamrock Rovers in February 2011, coming on as a half-time substitute for Craig Sives in a Leinster Senior Cup game away to Dundalk. His league debut came on 12 September when he started in a 1–1 draw with St Patrick's Athletic, his only league appearance of the 2011 season. Gannon was part of the Shamrock Rovers squad that became the first ever Irish side to reach the group stage of European competition when they knocked out Partizan Belgrade in the Europa League 4th qualifying round, however he made no appearances in qualifying and was cut from the 25-man squad for the group stage.

In 2012, Gannon moved closer to the Shamrock Rovers first team, making 8 league appearances and playing in 7 cup games, where he was mostly deployed as a right-back. He was part of the Shamrock Rovers team that won the Leinster Senior Cup and scored three times for the club in cup competition. At the end of the season he was released by new manager Trevor Croly.

=== St Patrick's Athletic ===
Gannon signed for Liam Buckley at St Patrick's Athletic on 27 November 2012. He played 13 league games for St Pat's as they went on to win the 2013 League of Ireland Premier Division, featuring mostly as a central midfielder. Although Gannon was kept from playing in his favoured position by right-back Ger O'Brien, he later stated that he learned a lot from the experience of playing in the same team as him.

=== Dundalk ===
On 6 November 2013, Gannon linked back up with his former Shamrock Rovers manager Stephen Kenny at Dundalk, becoming Kenny's first new signing for the 2014 season. In his first season at the club, he was part of a defence that kept sixteen clean sheets on their way to winning the league title on the final day of the season. Gannon played in all thirty-three league games and scored two goals in wins over Drogheda United and his former club, St. Patrick's Athletic. His goal against the latter included a 36-pass build-up involving all ten outfield players and was widely regarded as one of the league's goals of the season. Gannon also won the League Cup appearing in a 3–2 defeat of Shamrock Rovers in the final and made his European debut in July 2014 against Jeunesse Esch. Gannon's reliability, willingness to attack, and form over the course of the season earned him comparison to former Manchester United full-back Denis Irwin and also a place in the PFAI Premier Division Team of the Year. After the season ended, Gannon turned down the opportunity to go on trial to Millwall in favour of signing a new contract with Dundalk.

The following season, Gannon appeared in all but one of Dundalk's Premier Division matches as they retained their league title, scoring once in a 2–0 win over Shamrock Rovers. He played in both UEFA Champions League second qualifying round games as Dundalk were eliminated by BATE Borisov. Gannon also won the FAI Cup, going off injured with an ankle ligament injury in the 43rd minute of the final. He celebrated the winning goal by limping down the touchline on crutches and waving them in the air towards the fans. Following the end of the season, he was again rewarded with a place in the PFAI Team of the Year for the second year in-a-row.

Gannon returned from his injury to appear in all 6 of Dundalk's UEFA Champions League qualifier games in 2016 as they became the first ever Irish side to reach the play-off round. Gannon received significant exposure due to this achievement, appearing on The 7 O'Clock Show on TV3 and RTÉ's Saturday Night with Miriam in August 2016. He regards the European qualifying games as the stage where League of Ireland players are truly judged, and considers the third qualifying round victory over BATE Borisov as the highlight of his career to date. 2017 was a more challenging year for Dundalk with rivals Cork City doing the League and FAI Cup double. Gannon signed a new three-year contract with Dundalk in November 2017, and was a key part of the team that retained the league title in 2018. He was also voted onto the PFAI Team of the Year for the fifth year in a row.

=== Return to Rovers ===
Gannon signed back for The Hoops in December 2020

During his three seasons at the club he played in 17 European ties most notably in the 2022–23 UEFA Europa Conference League group stage.

== Career statistics ==
As of match played on 11 September 2026

Appearances and goals by club, season and competition
Club	Season	League			FAI Cup		League Cup		Europe		Other		Total	
Club	Season	Division	Apps	Goals	Apps	Goals	Apps	Goals	Apps	Goals	Apps	Goals	Apps	Goals
Shamrock Rovers	2011	LOI Premier Division	1	0	3	0	1	0	0	0	2 (Note: Appearance(s) in Leinster Senior Cup)	0	7	0
Shamrock Rovers	2012	LOI Premier Division	8	0	1	1	1	1	0	0	5 (Note: Three appearances and one goal in Leinster Senior Cup, two appearances in Setanta Sports Cup)	1	9	3
Shamrock Rovers	Total		9	0	4	1	2	1	0	0	7	1	16	3
St Patrick's Athletic	2013	LOI Premier Division	13	0	1	0	2	0	0	0	6 (Note: Four appearances & one goal in Leinster Senior Cup, two appearances in Setanta Sports Cup)	1	22	1
Dundalk	2014	LOI Premier Division	33	2	4	0	1	0	4 (Note: Appearances in UEFA Europa League)	0	4 (Note: Three appearances in Setanta Sports Cup, one appearance in Leinster Senior Cup)	0	46	2
Dundalk	2015	LOI Premier Division	32	1	5	1	1	0	2 (Note: Appearances in UEFA Champions League)	0	2 (Note: One appearance in President of Ireland's Cup, one appearance in Leinster Senior Cup)	0	42	2
Dundalk	2016	LOI Premier Division	26	0	4	0	1	0	12 (Note: Six appearances in UEFA Champions League, six appearances in UEFA Europa League)	0	2 (Note: One appearance in President of Ireland's Cup, one appearance in Leinster Senior Cup)	0	45	0
Dundalk	2017	LOI Premier Division	25	2	6	0	2	0	2	0	3 (Note: Two appearances in Leinster Senior Cup, one appearance in President of Ireland's Cup)	0	38	2
Dundalk	2018	LOI Premier Division	26	1	5	0	0	0	3	0	1	0	35	1
Dundalk	2019	LOI Premier Division	33	1	5	0	3	1	6 (Note: Four appearances in UEFA Champions League, two appearances in UEFA Europa League)	0	3 (Note: One appearance in President of Ireland's Cup, two appearances in Champions Cup)	0	50	2
Dundalk	2020	LOI Premier Division	15	0	4	0	–		8 (Note: One appearance in UEFA Champions League, seven appearances in UEFA Europa League)	0	–		26	0
Dundalk	Total		190	7	33	1	8	1	37	0	15	0	283	9
Shamrock Rovers	2021	LOI Premier Division	34	2	2	0	–		4 (Note: 1 appearance in UEFA Champions League, 3 appearances in UEFA Europa Conference League)	0	1 (Note: Appearance in President of Ireland's Cup)	0	41	2
Shamrock Rovers	2022	LOI Premier Division	26	1	3	0	–		12 (Note: 4 appearances in UEFA Champions League, 4 appearances in UEFA Europa League & 4 appearances in UEFA Europa Conference League)	0	1	0	42	1
Shamrock Rovers	2023	LOI Premier Division	10	0	0	0	–		1 (Note: Appearances in UEFA Europa Conference League)	0	1	0	12	0
Shamrock Rovers	Total		70	3	5	0	–		17	0	3	0	98	3
Shelbourne	2024	LOI Premier Division	33	0	1	0	–		2 (Note: Appearances in UEFA Conference League)	0	0	0	36	0
Shelbourne	2025	LOI Premier Division	24	0	1	0	–		9 (Note: 2 appearances in UEFA Champions League; 1 appearance in UEFA Europa League; 6 appearances in UEFA Conference League)	0	1	0	36	0
Shelbourne	2026	LOI Premier Division	22	0	1	0	–		3	0	0	0	26	0
Shelbourne	Total		79	0	3	0	–		14	0	1	0	98	0
Career Total			361	10	46	2	12	2	68	0	32	2	517	16

== Honours ==
=== Club ===
Shamrock Rovers

- League of Ireland Premier Division (4): 2011, 2021, 2022, 2023
- President of Ireland's Cup (1): 2022
- Leinster Senior Cup (1): 2012

St Patrick's Athletic

- League of Ireland Premier Division (1): 2013

Dundalk

- League of Ireland Premier Division (5): 2014, 2015, 2016, 2018, 2019
- FAI Cup (3): 2015, 2018, 2020
- League of Ireland Cup (3): 2014, 2017, 2019
- President of Ireland's Cup (2): 2015, 2019
- Leinster Senior Cup (1): 2015
- Champions Cup (1): 2019

Shelbourne

- League of Ireland Premier Division (1): 2024

=== Individual ===
- PFAI Team of the Year (6): 2014, 2015, 2016, 2017, 2018, 2019
