= 2019 League of Ireland Cup =

46th season of the League of Ireland's secondary knockout competition

EA Sports Cup

Tournament details
- Country: Ireland
- Dates: 4 March – 14 September 2019
- Teams: 23

Final positions
- Champions: Dundalk
- Runners-up: Derry City

Tournament statistics
- Matches played: 20
- Top goal scorer: David Parkhouse (7 goals)

The 2019 League of Ireland Cup, also known for sponsorship reasons as the 2019 EA Sports Cup, was the 46th season of the League of Ireland's secondary knockout competition. The EA Sports Cup featured teams from the SSE Airtricity League Premier and First Divisions, as well as some intermediate level teams. Dundalk defeated Derry City in the final in a penalty shoot-out, following a 2-2 draw.

The competition structure was altered for 2019 with all Premier Division entering at the second round stage.

== Preliminary round ==
16 February 2019	Midleton	0–1	Bluebell United	Midleton
15:00 GMT			Gary Seery 85'	Stadium: Knockgriffin Park

== First round ==
All ten teams from the League of Ireland First Division as well as one representative from the Leinster Senior League and one representative from the Ulster Senior League entered the competition at this stage. The draw for the first round was made on 20 February 2019 with fixtures set for 4 and 5 March 2019. The game between Cobh Ramblers and Limerick was postponed until 18 March 2019 due to inclement weather on the original date

4 March 2019	Athlone Town	1–2 (a.e.t.)	Galway United	Athlone
19:45 GMT	George Mukete 7'		Conor Barry 70'; Vinny Faherty 112'	Stadium: Athlone Town Stadium; Referee: Anthony Buttimer

4 March 2019	Bray Wanderers	3–2	Wexford	Bray
19:45 GMT	Derek Daly 25'; Dylan Barnett 29'; Dylan McGlade 30' (pen.)	Report	Ryan Nolan 49'; Sean Roche 90'	Stadium: Carlisle Grounds; Attendance: 427; Referee: Alan Carey

4 March 2019	Drogheda United	0–1	Cabinteely	Drogheda
19:45 GMT		Report	Luke Clucas 71'	Stadium: United Park; Attendance: 150 (estimate); Referee: Alan Patchell

4 March 2019	Shelbourne	1–0	Bluebell United	Drumcondra, Dublin
19:45 GMT	Daniel McKenna 21'	Report		Stadium: Tolka Park; Referee: Paul Tuite

5 March 2019	Longford Town	1–0	Cockhill Celtic	Longford
19:45 GMT	Adam Evans 6'			Stadium: City Calling Stadium; Referee: Marc Lynch

18 March 2019	Cobh Ramblers	3–1	Limerick	Cobh
15:00 GMT	Denzil Fernandes 6'; Bryan Murphy 73'; Jaze Kabia 87'	Report	Sean McSweeney 84'	Stadium: St Colman's Park; Referee: Anthony Buttimer

== Second round ==
All ten League of Ireland Premier Division clubs entered at this stage of the competition. The draw for the second round was made on 12 March 2019 with fixtures taking place on 1/2 April 2019.

1 April 2019	Bohemians	2–1	Cabinteely	Phibsborough, Dublin
19:45 GMT	Ryan Graydon 56'; Sam Byrne 77' (pen.)	Report	Luke Clucas 33'	Stadium: Dalymount Park; Attendance: 500 (Estimate); Referee: Stephen Parnell

1 April 2019	Bray Wanderers	0–0 (a.e.t.) (4–2 p)	Shamrock Rovers	Bray
19:45 GMT		Report		Stadium: Carlisle Grounds; Attendance: 635; Referee: Derek Tomney
	Penalties
	Luka Lovic (penalty scored); Richie Purdy (penalty scored); Dylan McGlade (penalty scored); Dylan Barnett (penalty scored)		Greg Bolger (penalty scored); Brandon Kavanagh (penalty missed); Aaron Greene (penalty missed); Dylan Watts (penalty scored)

1 April 2019	Cork City	4–1	Cobh Ramblers	Cork
19:45 GMT	James Tilley 37'; Liam Nash 48'; Gary Comerford 66'; Darragh Crowley 78'	Report	Denzil Fernandez 77'	Stadium: Turners Cross; Attendance: 991; Referee: Anthony Buttimer

1 April 2019	Finn Harps	2–1 (a.e.t.)	Sligo Rovers	Ballybofey
20:00 GMT	Mark Coyle 87'; Stephen Doherty 95'	Report	Dante Leverock 89'	Stadium: Finn Park; Referee: Michael Connolly

1 April 2019	St Patrick's Athletic	1–2	Dundalk	Inchicore, Dublin
19:45 GMT	James Doona 12'	Report	Georgie Kelly 6'; Dean Jarvis 34'	Stadium: Richmond Park; Referee: Robert Harvey

1 April 2019	Waterford	2–1	Galway United	Waterford
19:00 GMT	Dean Walsh 32'; Cory Galvin 66'	Report	Jeff McGowan 57'	Stadium: Waterford Regional Sports Centre; Referee: Sean Grant

2 April 2019	Derry City	3–0	Longford Town	Derry
19:45 GMT	Junior Ogedi-Uzokwe 19'; Eoghan Stokes 38'; Gerardo Bruna 70'	Report		Stadium: Brandywell Stadium; Attendance: 2,400 (est); Referee: Damien MacGraith

2 April 2019	Shelbourne	1–2	UCD	Drumcondra, Dublin
19:45 GMT	Derek Prendergast 2'	Report	Neil Farrugia 29'; Timmy Molloy 90'	Stadium: Tolka Park; Attendance: 250 (Estimate); Referee: Alan Patchell

== Quarter-final ==
The draw for the quarter-final was made on 8 April 2019 with fixtures taking place on Monday, 27 May 2019.

27 May 2019	Bohemians	2–0	Cork City	Phibsborough, Dublin
19:45 GMT	Ross Tierney 33'; Danny Mandroiu 82' (pen.)	Report		Stadium: Dalymount Park; Attendance: 665; Referee: Robert Hennessy

27 May 2019	Bray Wanderers	0–1	Waterford	Bray
19:45 GMT		Report	Scott Twine 15'	Stadium: Carlisle Grounds; Attendance: 400 (Estimate); Referee: Robert Harvey

27 May 2019	Derry City	2–1 (a.e.t.)	Finn Harps	Derry
19:45 GMT	David Parkhouse 83', 94'	Report	Nathan Boyle 55'	Stadium: Brandywell Stadium

27 May 2019	Dundalk	3–1	UCD	Dundalk
19:45 GMT	Brian Gartland 7'; John Mountney 18'; Georgie Kelly 90'	Report	Yousef Mahdy 80'	Stadium: Oriel Park; Attendance: 500 (estimate); Referee: David Dunne

== Semi-final ==
The draw for the semi-final was made on 28 May 2019. Both matches were scheduled to be played on 5 August 2019. The fixture between Dundalk and Bohemians was postponed until 19 August due to Dundalk's involvement in the UEFA Champions League.

5 August 2019	Derry City	4–2 (a.e.t.)	Waterford	Derry
19:00	David Parkhouse 45' (pen.), 70', 96', 108'	Report	Walter Figueira 24', 84'	Stadium: Brandywell Stadium; Attendance: 1,100 (estimate); Referee: Robert Rogers

19 August 2019	Dundalk	6–1	Bohemians	Dundalk
19:45	Patrick Hoban 4', 10', 14', 51'; Patrick McEleney 42'; Daniel Kelly 71'	Report	Ross Tierney 62'	Stadium: Oriel Park; Attendance: 1,500 (estimate); Referee: Paul McLaughlin

== Final ==
14 September 2019	Derry City	2–2 (a.e.t.) (5–6 p)	Dundalk	Derry
20:00	David Parkhouse 3'; Junior Ogedi-Uzokwe 51'	Report	Michael Duffy 38'; Sean Gannon 69'	Stadium: Brandywell Stadium
