= Garry Buckley =

Irish footballer (born 1993)

Personal information
- Date of birth: 19 August 1993 (age 33)
- Place of birth: Cork, Ireland
- Positions: Defender; midfielder

Team information
- Current team: Mallow United
- Number: 4

Youth career
- –2011: Leeds AFC
- 2011–2013: Cork City

Senior career*
Years	Team	Apps	(Gls)
2012–2019	Cork City	187	(33)
2020–2023	Sligo Rovers	69	(3)
2024–2025	Galway United	45	(0)
2026	Cobh Ramblers	13	(1)
- * Club domestic league appearances and goals as of 10:54, 7 July 2026 (UTC)

Garry Buckley (born 19 August 1993) is an Irish retired professional footballer who plays as a defender or midfielder. During his career played for Cork City, Sligo Rovers, Galway United and Cobh Ramblers.

== Career ==
=== Youth career ===
Buckley grew up in Ballyvolane on the north side of Cork and began playing schoolboy football with local club Leeds, before joining the academy of League of Ireland club Cork City in 2011, becoming a part of their under-19 side that won the double two years in a row before joining the first team.

=== Cork City ===
On 21 February 2012, Buckley made his first appearance in senior football for Cork City, in a 3–2 win away to Rockmount in the Munster Senior Cup. His first appearance in the league came on 7 September 2012, when he played the full 90 minutes and scored the only goal of the game in a 1–0 victory away to Derry City. In 2014, he scored a career best of 11 goals in 33 appearances in all competitions as his side went on an unexpected title charge, being beaten to the title in the final game of the season away to Dundalk. In September 2014, he signed a new contract with the club to the end of 2015. On 2 July 2015, he made his first appearance in European competition in a 1–1 draw at home to KR Reykjavik in the UEFA Europa League at Turners Cross. He played at the Aviva Stadium for the first time on 8 November 2015, as his side were beaten 1–0 by Dundalk in the 2015 FAI Cup final. On 26 November 2015, he signed a new 2-year contract with the club. On 6 November 2016, he played in the 2016 FAI Cup final in a 1–0 win over Dundalk at the Aviva Stadium. Buckley was part of the team that won the 2017 President of Ireland's Cup on 17 February 2017, beating Dundalk 3–0 at home. On 12 June 2017, he scored in a 4–2 win over Wilton United in the final of the Munster Senior Cup. On 29 June 2017, he scored his first European goal in a 2–0 win away to Estonian club Levadia Tallinn in the UEFA Europa League. Buckley won his first league medal on 17 October 2017 after a 0–0 draw with Derry City was enough to confirm the 2017 League of Ireland Premier Division title, the club's first in 12 years. On 5 November 2017, he was part of the side that won their fourth trophy of the year by beating Dundalk in the 2017 FAI Cup final at the Aviva Stadium after a penalty shootout. In November 2017, he signed a new 2-year contract with the club, calling it a "no brainer" of a decision. On 13 March he played in the 5–0 win over St Mary's in the final of the Munster Senior Cup. On 4 November 2018, he faced Dundalk in the 2018 FAI Cup final for the fourth year running in the final, but was on the losing end of a 2–1 scoreline at the Aviva Stadium. On 9 February 2019, he played in the 2019 President of Ireland's Cup as his side were again beaten 2–1 by Dundalk. On 22 March 2019, he came off the bench late on in a 3–1 win over Midleton in the final of the Munster Senior Cup. He left the club at the end of 2019 after scoring 46 goals in 257 appearances in all competitions during his 8 seasons there.

=== Sligo Rovers ===
Buckley signed for fellow League of Ireland Premier Division club Sligo Rovers on a 1-year contract on 28 November 2019. He made his debut for the club on 14 February 2020, in a 1–0 defeat to Finn Harps in the opening game of three season at Finn Park. Having impressed in his new position of Centre back alongside partner John Mahon and helping the club to European football for the following year, he signed a new contract with the club for the 2021 season on 7 December 2020. On 2 April 2021, he scored his first goal for the club in a 1–0 win over Longford Town at Bishopsgate. On 27 October 2021, he signed a new 2-year contract with the club having helped them once again secure European football. On 4 August 2022, he suffered an Anterior cruciate ligament injury away to Viking in a UEFA Europa Conference League game in Norway that ruled him out for just under a year. He made his return to the side in a 2–1 loss to Drogheda United in the FAI Cup on 21 July 2023. He left the club at the end of 2023, having scored 3 goals in 80 appearances over 4 seasons.

=== Galway United ===
Buckley signed for newly promoted League of Ireland Premier Division club Galway United on 12 December 2023. On 16 February 2024, he made his debut in the opening game of the season, a 1–0 defeat to St Patrick's Athletic at Eamonn Deacy Park, but had to be substituted off after he tore his quad, an injury that would keep him out of action for 3 months. On 15 November 2024, he signed a new contract with the club. On 15 August 2025 Buckley scored his only goal for the club in a 4–0 win over Salthill Devon in the FAI Cup. On 14 November 2025 Buckley announced his departure from the club.

=== Cobh Ramblers ===
On 18 November 2025 it was announced that Buckley had signed for League of Ireland First Division side Cobh Ramblers ahead of the 2026 season. On 7 July 2026, he announced his retirement from professional football.

== Style of play ==
Buckley was originally an Attacking midfielder in his 8 seasons with Cork City, but was converted to a Centre back while with Sligo Rovers in 2020, playing there for the majority of the remainder of his career.

== Personal life ==
In 2023, while out injured from football through an Anterior cruciate ligament injury, Buckley donated his Bone marrow to his brother Michael who was diagnosed with chronic myeloid leukaemia, after discovering that his bone marrow was a 100% match.

== Career statistics ==
As of match played on 3 July 2026

Appearances and goals by club, season and competition
Club	Season	League			National Cup (Note: Includes FAI Cup)		League Cup (Note: Includes League of Ireland Cup)		Europe		Other		Total	
Club	Season	Division	Apps	Goals	Apps	Goals	Apps	Goals	Apps	Goals	Apps	Goals	Apps	Goals
Cork City	2012	LOI Premier Division	3	1	0	0	0	0	—		2 (Note: Appearance(s) in the Munster Senior Cup)	0	5	1
Cork City	2013	LOI Premier Division	22	1	1	1	2	0	—		4 (Note: 3 appearances in the Setanta Sports Cup; 1 appearance in the Munster Senior Cup)	0	29	2
Cork City	2014	LOI Premier Division	29	9	2	0	2	2	—		0	0	33	11
Cork City	2015	LOI Premier Division	27	2	6	3	2	0	2 (Note: Appearance(s) in the UEFA Europa League)	0	1	0	38	5
Cork City	2016	LOI Premier Division	24	5	4	1	1	0	6	0	1	0	36	6
Cork City	2017	LOI Premier Division	26	6	4	2	2	1	4	1	4 (Note: 1 appearance in the President of Ireland's Cup; 3 appearances, 1 goal in the Munster Senior Cup)	1	36	11
Cork City	2018	LOI Premier Division	27	9	4	0	1	0	4 (Note: 2 appearances in the UEFA Champions League; 2 appearances in the UEFA Europa League)	0	2	0	38	9
Cork City	2019	LOI Premier Division	29	0	2	0	1	0	2	1	4 (Note: 1 appearance in the President of Ireland's Cup; 3 appearances in the Munster Senior Cup)	0	38	1
Cork City	Total		187	33	23	7	11	3	18	2	18	1	257	46
Sligo Rovers	2020	LOI Premier Division	12	0	2	0	—		—		—		14	0
Sligo Rovers	2021	LOI Premier Division	29	1	1	0	—		2 (Note: Appearance(s) in the UEFA Europa Conference League)	0	—		32	1
Sligo Rovers	2022	LOI Premier Division	17	2	1	0	—		4	0	—		22	2
Sligo Rovers	2023	LOI Premier Division	11	0	1	0	—		—		—		12	0
Sligo Rovers	Total		69	3	5	0	—		6	0	—		80	3
Galway United	2024	LOI Premier Division	21	0	2	0	—		—		—		23	0
Galway United	2025	LOI Premier Division	24	0	2	1	—		—		—		26	1
Galway United	Total		45	0	4	1	—		—		—		49	1
Cobh Ramblers	2026	LOI First Division	13	1	—		—		—		1	0	14	1
Career Total			314	37	32	8	11	3	24	2	19	1	400	51

== Honours ==
Cork City

- League of Ireland Premier Division (1): 2017
- FAI Cup (2): 2016, 2017
- President of Ireland's Cup (3): 2016, 2017, 2018
- Munster Senior Cup (3): 2016–17, 2017–18, 2018–19
