= John Caulfield (Irish footballer) =

Irish footballer

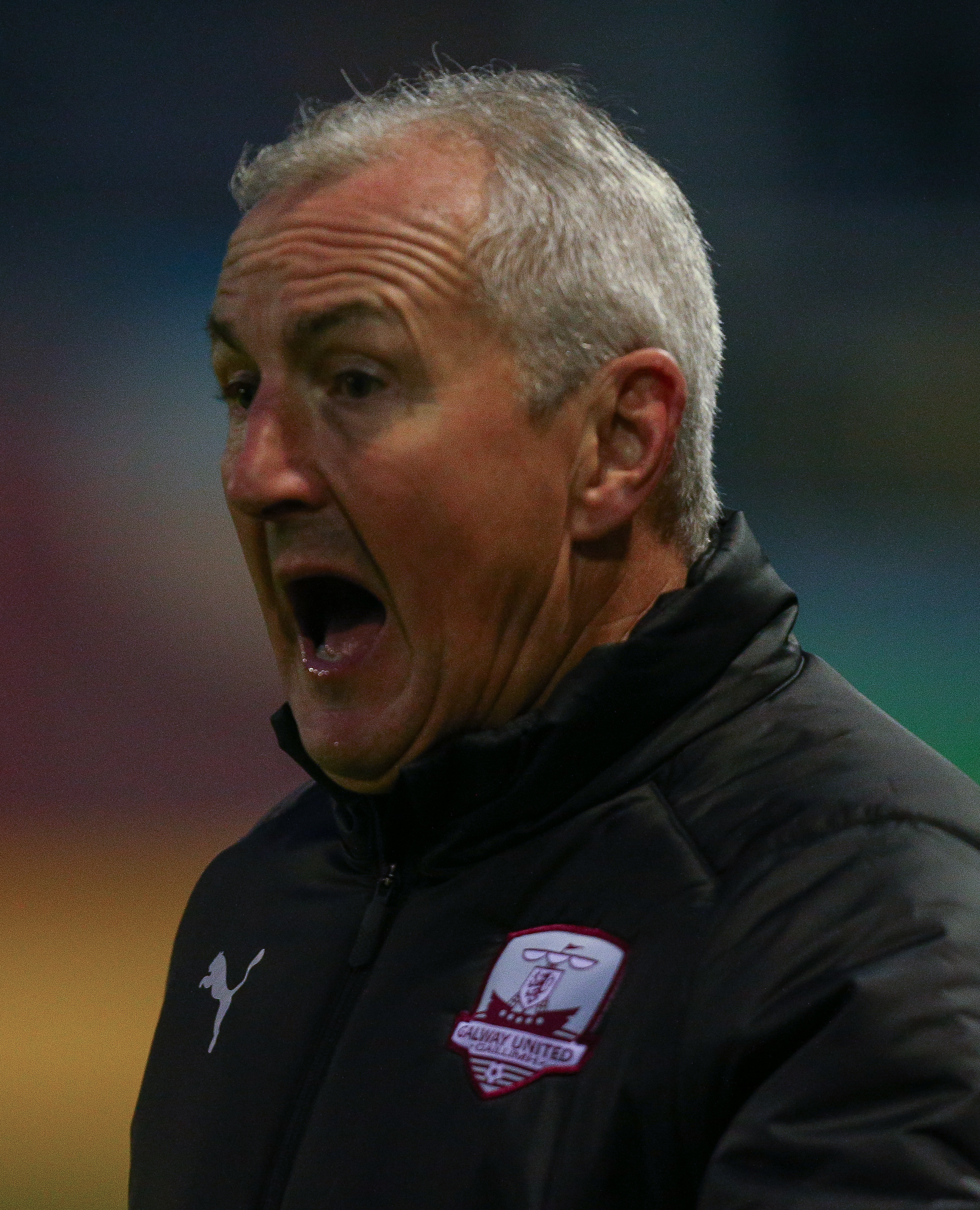
- Caulfield in 2020

Personal information
- Full name: John Caulfield
- Date of birth: 11 October 1964 (age 62)
- Place of birth: New York City, United States
- Position: Forward

Senior career*
Years	Team	Apps	(Gls)
1983–1985	Athlone Town	1	(0)
1985–1986	Wembley		
1986–2001	Cork City	455	(129)
2001–2002	Avondale United		

Managerial career
- 2001–2002: West Cork Schoolboys
- 2002–2010: Avondale United
- 2010–2013: UCC
- 2013–2019: Cork City
- 2020–: Galway United
- * Club domestic league appearances and goals

John Caulfield (born 11 October 1964) is an Irish football coach and former player who is the manager of Galway United.

Caulfield spent the majority of his playing career at Cork City and was a member of the team that won the 1992–93 League of Ireland Premier Division. He was also the League of Ireland Premier Division Top Scorer in both 1991–92 and 1994–95.

As a manager, Caulfield has won the 2016 FAI Cup, 2017 FAI Cup and 2017 League of Ireland Premier Division with Cork City.

Caulfield has also played Gaelic football and represented both Roscommon and Cork at inter-county level, winning an All-Ireland title with the latter.

== Family ==
Caulfield was born in the Bronx borough of New York City. His mother was from County Cork and his father was from County Mayo. When he was a young child he moved with his family to County Roscommon. As a schoolboy he attended matches with his father at Athlone Town, including the 1975–76 UEFA Cup game against A.C. Milan. While a boarder at Summerhill College, where he studied for his Leaving Cert, he also attended matches at Sligo Rovers.

His brother Daniel is Head of Track & Field at California Vulcans

== Playing career ==
=== Early years ===
While completing his third level education at Athlone Regional College, Caulfield began playing for Athlone Town as a defender. In 1983–84, together with Turlough O'Connor and Fran Hitchcock, he was a member of the Athlone Town reserve team that won the League of Ireland B Division. He also made his first senior League of Ireland appearance with Athlone Town, coming on as substitute against Home Farm on 27 October 1985, making what Caulfield himself described as a "three-minute" debut. In 1985, he moved to Enniskeane and Ballineen in West Cork and began working in the local Soundstore shop. He also began playing for Wembley in the Munster Senior League.

=== Cork City ===
Between 1986 and 2001, Caulfield played for Cork City, making his debut in a League of Ireland Cup game against Kilkenny City. Shortly after he scored the club's first hat-trick in a 3-2 win over Sligo Rovers on 23 November 1986. Together with Pat Morley and Dave Barry, he subsequently became a prominent member of the City team that won the 1992–93 Premier Division, the 1997–98 FAI Cup, three League of Ireland Cups and eleven Munster Senior Cups. During this time Caulfield made 455 appearances for the club. This remains a club record. Caulfield is also the holder of several other club records including most starts (376) and most substitute appearances (79). Together with Pat Morley, he is the club's joint all-time top scorer with 129 goals. He was also the League of Ireland Premier Division Top Scorer in both 1991–92 and 1994–95. In 2008, he was inducted into the club's Hall of Fame.

While playing for Cork City, Caulfield continued to live in Ballineen and Enniskeane where he started a family with his wife, Grainne. They have two daughters, Sinead and Aideen. Throughout Caulfield's playing career with Cork City he maintained his amateur status and worked as a sale rep, initially with Bulmers and later for Diageo. He would continue to work for Diageo until he was appointed manager of Cork City in 2013.

=== Gaelic football ===
As well as playing association football, Caulfield has also played Gaelic football at inter-county level. He initially represented Roscommon as a minor but after moving to West Cork he played for St Mary's, Carbery and then for Cork at inter-county junior level. In 1990, he was a member of the Cork team that won the Munster and All-Ireland Junior Football Championships. In the All-Ireland final on 9 September at Páirc Uí Chaoimh he scored 1–3 as Cork defeated Warwickshire 3–16 to 0–8. He continued to play for St Mary's until 2007 and was subsequently part of the coaching staff that guided the club to the 2009 West Cork Junior A Football Championship.

== Coaching career ==
=== Early years ===
While still playing for Cork City, Caulfield began attending FAI coaching courses and was tutored by, among others, Brian Kerr. He also began coaching schoolboy teams at Riverside Athletic, the Ballineen-based team that played in the West Cork League. He also coached the West Cork Schoolboys League representative team that played in the Kennedy Cup at inter-league level.

=== Avondale United ===
Between 2002 and 2010 Caulfield served as manager of Avondale United in the Munster Senior League. During this time Caulfield transformed Avondale into one of the leading intermediate clubs in the Republic of Ireland. In 2004–05 Avondale reached the Munster Senior Cup. Caulfield was initially a player/coach at Avondale and in the semi-final he scored the opening goal in a 3–1 win over Clonmel Town. With Caulfield in charge Avondale won the FAI Intermediate Cup in 2005–06 and 2006–07 and two Munster Premier Division titles in 2008–09 and 2009–10.

=== UCC ===
Between 2010 and 2013 served as manager of University College Cork A.F.C., who like Avondale United, played in the Munster Senior League. Caulfield guided UCC to success in both the 2011 Collingwood Cup and in the 2011–12 MSL Senior First Division which saw them promoted to the Senior Premier Division.

=== Cork City ===
On 5 November 2013 Caulfield was appointed manager of Cork City, succeeding Tommy Dunne. With Caulfield in charge, Cork City have finished as runners-up in the League of Ireland Premier Division in 2014, 2015 and 2016. They were also runners-up in the 2015 FAI Cup. In 2016 Caulfield guided Cork City to victory in both the President's Cup and the FAI Cup. In the 2016 FAI Cup Final, City won when Sean Maguire scored a last minute extra time goal against Dundalk. In the 2016–17 UEFA Europa League Caulfield guided City to the Third Qualifying Round, defeating Linfield and BK Häcken before losing out to K.R.C. Genk. The victory over Linfield ensured that Caulfield was the first American-born manager to progress in a two-legged tie in European competition. When Caulfield managed Cork City to the 2017 League of Ireland Premier Division title a year later, he became the first American-born manager to win a top-tier league in Europe. He followed up this success by coaching his team to victory in the 2017 FAI Cup, thus completing the double.

In May 2019, Caulfield left his position as manager of Cork City after a disappointing start to the season in which the club picked up 13 points from their 14 league games.

=== Galway United ===
In August 2020, Caulfield took over as manager of Galway United, halfway through the 2020 season following the sacking of Alan Murphy. United won the first five league games under his management as he guided the club to the promotion playoffs, however a loss to Longford Town saw the club remain in the Division for the following season. In 2021, after a sluggish start in which the club took just 9 points from the opening 9 league games, a strong finish to the season saw United finish 2nd behind Shelbourne. A home defeat to Bray in the playoffs saw the club again miss out on promotion. 2022 saw the club make the best ever start to a league season but a loss of form in the second half of the season resulted in a 3rd placed finish and another trip to the playoffs, this time Waterford FC ending the promotion hopes. He signed a new contract in September 2021 to bring him to the end of the 2023 season. The 2023 season saw them win the first division at the top with 94 points from 30 wins, 4 draws and only 2 losses for the entire season earning them promotion to the Premier Division, and in their first season back Caulfield guided Galway to a 5th place finish which was the club's highest since 1994. On 28 November 2025, Caulfield signed a new two-year-contract with the club.

== Managerial statistics ==
=== Managerial career ===
As of match played 30 October 2026

Managerial record by team and tenure
Team	From	To	Record							
Team	From	To	G	W	D	L	GF	GA	GD	Win %
(Republic of Ireland) Cork City	5 November 2013	1 May 2019	251	155	42	54	483	202	+281	61.75
(Republic of Ireland) Galway United	21 August 2020	Present	235	111	59	65	382	241	+141	47.23
Total			486	266	101	119	865	443	+422	54.73

== Honours ==
=== Player ===
==== Association football ====
Cork City

- League of Ireland Premier Division
  - 1992–93: 1
- FAI Cup
  - 1997–98: 1
- League of Ireland Cup
  - 1987–88, 1994–95, 1998–99: 3
- Munster Senior Cup
  - 1987–88, 1989–90, 1990–91, 1991–92, 1992–93, 1993–94, 1996–97, 1997–98, 1998–99, 1999–2000, 2000–01: 11

Athlone Town

- League of Ireland B Division
  - 1983–84: 1

Individual

- League of Ireland Premier Division Top Scorer
  - 1991–92, 1994-95: 2

==== Gaelic football ====
Cork GAA

- 1990 All-Ireland Junior Football Championship
- 1990 Munster Junior Football Championship

=== Manager ===
Cork City

- FAI Cup
  - Winners: 2016, 2017: 2
  - Runners Up: 2015, 2018: 2
- President of Ireland's Cup
  - Winners: 2016, 2017, 2018: 3
- League of Ireland Premier Division
  - Winners: 2017: 1
  - Runners Up: 2014, 2015, 2016, 2018: 4

UCC

- Collingwood Cup
  - 2011
- Munster Senior League Senior First Division
  - 2011–12

Avondale United

- FAI Intermediate Cup
  - 2005–06, 2006–07: 2
- Munster Senior League Senior Premier Division
  - 2008–09, 2009–10: 2
- Munster Senior League Senior First Division
  - 2002–03: 1

Galway United

- League of Ireland First Division
  - Winners: 2023: 1
  - Runners Up: 2021: 1
- PFAI 2023 First Division Manager of the Year

== Sources ==
- Rebel Heart - John Caulfield : An Autobiography (ISBN 9781910827130)
