= Greg Bolger =

Irish footballer (born 1988)

Personal information
- Full name: Greg Bolger
- Date of birth: 9 September 1988 (age 38)
- Place of birth: New Ross, County Wexford, Ireland
- Height: 1.80 m (5 ft 11 in)
- Position: Midfielder

Youth career
- New Ross Celtic
- Wexford
- –2006: Cherry Orchard
- 2006–2007: UCD

Senior career*
Years	Team	Apps	(Gls)
2007–2010	UCD	64	(10)
2011	Sporting Fingal	0	(0)
2011	Dundalk	24	(2)
2012–2015	St Patrick's Athletic	104	(6)
2016–2017	Cork City	47	(1)
2018–2020	Shamrock Rovers	62	(4)
2021–2023	Sligo Rovers	83	(1)
2024–2026	Cork City	80	(3)
Total		456	(27)

International career
2010	Republic of Ireland U23	2	(0)
- * Club domestic league appearances and goals as of 21:52, 18 October 2026 (UTC)

Greg Bolger (born 9 September 1988) is an Irish former professional footballer who played as a midfielder for League of Ireland clubs UCD, Sporting Fingal, Dundalk, St Patrick's Athletic, Cork City, Shamrock Rovers and Sligo Rovers.

During his career, the trophies he won include 3 Premier Division titles and 4 FAI Cup wins. In 2010 he earned 2 caps for the Republic of Ireland U23 team.

== Career ==
=== Youth career ===
A native of New Ross, County Wexford, Bolger began playing with his local side New Ross Celtic, before moving onto the academy of his local League of Ireland club Wexford, then to Dublin side Cherry Orchard, where he earned a move to UCD in 2006.

=== UCD ===
Bolger made his senior debut for UCD in a 1–0 loss to Cork City on 23 March 2007. His first goal at senior level came on 22 August 2008 in a 2–1 loss to Derry City at the UCD Bowl. Following their relegation in 2008, Bolger was part of the UCD side that won the 2009 League of Ireland First Division title to regain promotion. He impressed upon the club's return to the League of Ireland Premier Division, scoring 7 goals in 33 appearances in all competitions. In total he made 76 appearances in his 4 seasons with the club, scoring 10 goals.

=== Sporting Fingal ===
Bolger signed for Sporting Fingal ahead of the 2011 season, but on 9 February 2011 the club went bust, cancelling all player contracts in the process, in Bolger's case before he had even made his debut.

=== Dundalk ===
On 10 February 2011, Bolger signed for Dundalk. He made his debut 4 days later in a 5–3 win away to Linfield in the Setanta Sports Cup. On 14 May 2011, he featured in the Final of the 2011 Setanta Sports Cup, as his side were defeated 2–0 by Shamrock Rovers at Tallaght Stadium. He scored his first 2 goals for the club in a 6–1 win over Galway United on 24 June 2011. Bolger made a total of 33 appearances during the season, scoring 2 goals as the side finished in 7th place.

=== St Patrick's Athletic ===
==== 2012 season ====
Bolger signed for fellow League of Ireland Premier Division side St Patrick's Athletic in January 2012. He made his debut for the club on 20 February 2012 in a 1–0 loss at home to Cliftonville in the Setanta Sports Cup. His first goal for the club came on 20 April 2012 in a 2–0 win over one of his former clubs UCD. The Summer of 2012 saw Bolger's first taste of European football, as he featured in all 6 of his side's games in their UEFA Europa League campaign as they defeated ÍBV of Iceland, Široki Brijeg of Bosnia and Herzegovina before being knocked out by Bundesliga side Hannover 96. In October 2012, Bolger scored in a 3–0 win over his former club Dundalk in the FAI Cup Semi Final but missed out on the 2012 FAI Cup Final due to injury, as his side lost to Derry City in extra-time.

==== 2013 season ====
On 13 October 2013, Bolger opened the scoring with a 25-yard strike into the top corner in a 2–0 win over Sligo Rovers at Richmond Park, a win that secured the 2013 League of Ireland Premier Division title for the club. On 20 October, 2 days after being award the league trophy, Bolger featured in a fatigued Pats side that were defeated 1–0 by Shamrock Rovers in the 2013 Leinster Senior Cup Final. He was named in the PFAI Team of the Year for 2013 by his fellow players on 17 October 2013. On 17 November 2013, Bolger was named as the club's Player of the Year by their supporters.

==== 2014 season ====
On 2 March 2014, he was part of the team that won the 2014 President of Ireland's Cup with a 1–0 win over Sligo Rovers. He made his UEFA Champions League debut on 16 July 2014 in a 1–1 draw away to Legia Warsaw. He was part of the side that ended the club's 53-year wait for an FAI Cup win, as he received the Man of the Match award in his side's 2–0 win over Derry City in the 2014 FAI Cup Final at the Aviva Stadium.

==== 2015 season ====
He featured in the 2015 President of Ireland's Cup on 28 February 2015 as his side lost 2–1 to Dundalk at Oriel Park. On 24 March 2015, he scored a 45-yard lob to open the scoring in a 2–0 win over Derry City at Richmond Park. In July 2015, Bolger was subject to a transfer bid from Scottish Premiership club Motherwell, which was rejected by St Patrick's Athletic. On 19 September 2015, Bolger played the full 120 minutes of the 2015 League of Ireland Cup Final, which saw his side defeat Galway United 4–3 on penalties at Eamonn Deacy Park following a 0–0 draw after extra time.

In total, Bolger made 145 appearances for the Saints, scoring 9 goals.

=== Cork City ===
==== 2016 season ====
Ahead of the 2016 League of Ireland Premier Division, Bolger signed for the previous season's runners-up Cork City. On 28 February he played in the 2016 President of Ireland's Cup as Cork defeated league champions Dundalk 2–0 to claim the trophy. Bolger was named League of Ireland Player of the Month for June 2016. His first and only goal for the club came on 16 September 2016, when he scored an 89th-minute penalty in a 3–0 win over Shamrock Rovers at Turners Cross. Bolger was named on the PFAI Team of the Year for 2016 by his fellow players. On 6 November 2016, Bolger featured in the 2016 FAI Cup Final, which his side won 1–0 thanks to a 120th-minute winner from Sean Maguire.

==== 2017 season ====
On 18 February 2017, he was part of the team that defeated Dundalk 3–0 in the 2017 President of Ireland's Cup to retain the trophy. On 12 June 2017, he was part of the side that won the 2017 Munster Senior Cup with a 4–2 win over Wilton in the final. Bolger claimed the second Premier Division medal of his career on 17 October 2017, when Cork clinched the 2017 League of Ireland Premier Division title following a 0–0 draw with Derry City. On 5 November 2017, he helped his side complete the double by defeating Dundalk 5–3 on penalties in the 2017 FAI Cup Final following a 1–1 draw after extra time, with Bolger scoring his penalty in the shootout.

=== Shamrock Rovers ===
On 7 November 2017, Bolger agreed to join Shamrock Rovers for their 2018 season. He made his debut for the club on 16 February 2018 in a 3–1 defeat to Bohemians at Dalymount Park. On 14 September 2018, he scored his first goal for the club in a 5–0 win over Limerick at Tallaght Stadium. On 3 November 2019, Bolger scored his penalty in the shootout as his side defeated Dundalk 4–2 on penalties in the 2019 FAI Cup Final following a 1–1 draw after extra time, ending a 32-year wait for an FAI Cup win for his club. Bolger picked up an injury in a friendly with Wexford in July 2020 that would rule him out until late in the season. He recovered from injury in time to play a part in the 2020 FAI Cup Final, replacing Dylan Watts in the 83rd minute as his side were defeated 4–2 by Dundalk after extra time in a behind-closed-doors Aviva Stadium.

=== Sligo Rovers ===
On 11 December 2020, it was announced that Bolger would be signing for Sligo Rovers ahead of the 2021 season, reuniting with Liam Buckley, his former manager at St Patrick's Athletic. He was named League of Ireland Player of the Month for the second time in his career for the month of May 2021, after leading his side to the top of the table. Bolger signed a new contract with the club on 17 November 2022 that would see him act as a player-coach under manager John Russell, who was a former teammate of Bolger's at St Patrick's Athletic. On 29 April 2023, Bolger scored his first and only goal for the club in a 2–1 defeated to his former club Shamrock Rovers. He made a total of 88 appearances in all competitions for the club, scoring 1 goal.

=== Return to Cork City ===
==== 2024 season ====
On 23 December 2023, newly relegated League of Ireland First Division side Cork City announced that Bolger would be returning to the club for their 2024 season in a player-coach capacity, working under new manager Tim Clancy. On 3 June 2024, he made his 400th League of Ireland appearance, in a 0–0 draw with UCD at Turners Cross. On 6 September 2024, he was part of the side that defeated UCD 1–0 at the UCD Bowl to win promotion by winning the 2024 League of Ireland First Division. At the end of the season he was named in the PFAI First Division Team of the Year.

==== 2025 season ====
Amidst consideration of retirement from football, Bolger signed a new one-year contract with the club on 24 October 2024. He scored his first goal since returning to the club on 14 February 2025, in a 2–2 draw at home to Galway United in the opening game of the season. On 9 November 2025, he was part of the starting 11 in the 2025 FAI Cup final as his side were beaten 2–0 by Shamrock Rovers at the Aviva Stadium. He made a total of 24 appearances in all competitions in 2025, scoring 1 goal, as the club were relegated back to the League of Ireland First Division by finishing bottom of the league.

==== 2026 season ====
On 2 January 2026, Bolger signed a new contract with the club following their relegation. On 27 March 2026, he scored his first goal of the season in a 4–1 win over Athlone Town at Turners Cross. On 4 September 2026, his side clinched the 2026 League of Ireland First Division title, earning Bolger the third First Division winners medal of his career. On 4 October 2026, he announced that he would be retiring from football at the end of the season, following a 20-year career in the League of Ireland.

== International career ==
Bolger was called up to the Republic of Ireland U23 side for their game against England in May 2010, making his debut in a 2–1 loss. He also featured in the side's 1–0 win away to Estonia in September 2010.

== Career statistics ==
As of match played on 9 October 2026

Appearances and goals by club, season and competition
Club	Season	League			FAI Cup		League Cup		Europe		Other		Total	
Club	Season	Division	Apps	Goals	Apps	Goals	Apps	Goals	Apps	Goals	Apps	Goals	Apps	Goals
UCD	2007	LOI Premier Division	5	0	2	0	2	0	—		—		9	0
UCD	2008	LOI Premier Division	13	1	0	0	1	0	—		—		14	1
UCD	2009	LOI First Division	17	2	1	0	2	0	—		—		20	2
UCD	2010	LOI Premier Division	29	7	2	0	0	0	—		2 (Note: Appearance(s) in the Leinster Senior Cup)	0	33	7
UCD	Total		64	10	5	0	5	0	—		2	0	76	10
Sporting Fingal	2011	LOI Premier Division	0	0	—		—		—		—		0	0
Dundalk	2011	LOI Premier Division	24	2	5	0	0	0	—		4 (Note: Apprarance(s) in the Setanta Sports Cup)	0	33	2
St Patrick's Athletic	2012	LOI Premier Division	28	3	4	1	2	0	6 (Note: Apprarance(s) in the UEFA Europa League)	0	1	0	41	4
St Patrick's Athletic	2013	LOI Premier Division	29	1	3	1	0	0	2	0	2	0	36	2
St Patrick's Athletic	2014	LOI Premier Division	24	0	4	0	1	0	2 (Note: Appearance(s) in the UEFA Champions League)	0	6 (Note: 1 appearance in the President of Ireland's Cup, 2 appearances in the Setanta Sports Cup, 3 appearances & 1 goal in the Leinster Senior Cup)	1	37	1
St Patrick's Athletic	2015	LOI Premier Division	23	2	1	0	2	0	2	0	3 (Note: 1 appearance in the President of Ireland's Cup, 1 appearance in the Leinster Senior Cup)	0	31	2
St Patrick's Athletic	Total		104	6	12	2	5	0	12	0	12	1	145	9
Cork City	2016	LOI Premier Division	27	1	4	0	1	0	5	0	2 (Note: 1 appearance in the President of Ireland's Cup & 1 appearance in the Munster Senior Cup)	0	39	1
Cork City	2017	LOI Premier Division	20	0	3	0	3	0	4	0	4 (Note: 1 appearance in the President of Ireland's Cup & 3 appearances in the Munster Senior Cup)	0	34	0
Cork City	Total		47	1	7	0	4	0	9	0	6	0	73	1
Shamrock Rovers	2018	LOI Premier Division	31	1	0	0	0	0	2	0	0	0	33	1
Shamrock Rovers	2019	LOI Premier Division	28	3	4	0	1	0	4	0	0	0	37	3
Shamrock Rovers	2020	LOI Premier Division	3	0	2	0	—		0	0	—		5	0
Shamrock Rovers	Total		62	4	6	0	1	0	6	0	0	0	75	4
Sligo Rovers	2021	LOI Premier Division	26	0	1	0	—		1 (Note: Appearance(s) in the UEFA Europa Conference League)	0	—		28	0
Sligo Rovers	2022	LOI Premier Division	26	0	0	0	—		2	0	—		28	0
Sligo Rovers	2023	LOI Premier Division	31	1	1	0	—		—		—		32	1
Sligo Rovers	Total		83	1	2	0	—		3	0	—		88	1
Cork City	2024	LOI First Division	31	0	2	0	—		—		0 (Note: Appearance(s) in the Munster Senior Cup)	0	33	0
Cork City	2025	LOI Premier Division	20	1	3	0	—		—		1	0	24	1
Cork City	2026	LOI First Division	29	2	1	0	—		—		0	0	30	2
Cork City	Total		80	3	6	0	—		—		1	0	87	3
Total			456	27	43	2	15	0	30	0	25	1	577	30

== Honours ==
=== Club ===
UCD

- League of Ireland First Division (1): 2009

St Patrick's Athletic

- League of Ireland Premier Division (1): 2013
- FAI Cup (1): 2014
- League of Ireland Cup (1): 2015
- President of Ireland's Cup (1): 2014
- Leinster Senior Cup (1): 2013–14

Cork City

- League of Ireland Premier Division (1): 2017
- League of Ireland First Division (2): 2024, 2026
- FAI Cup (2): 2016, 2017
- President of Ireland's Cup (2): 2016, 2017
- Munster Senior Cup (1): 2017

Shamrock Rovers

- League of Ireland Premier Division (1): 2020
- FAI Cup (1): 2019

=== Individual ===
- St Patrick's Athletic Player of the Year (1): 2013
- PFAI Premier Division Team of the Year (2): 2013, 2016
- PFAI First Division Team of the Year (1): 2024
- League of Ireland Player of the Month (2): June 2016, May 2021
