= John Dunleavy =

Irish footballer (born 1991)

Personal information
- Full name: John Francis Dunleavy
- Date of birth: 3 July 1991 (age 35)
- Place of birth: Ballybofey, County Donegal, Ireland
- Positions: Midfielder; right back

Youth career
- 2006–2009: Wolverhampton Wanderers

Senior career*
Years	Team	Apps	(Gls)
2009–2011	Wolverhampton Wanderers	0	(0)
2011	→ Barnet (loan)	3	(0)
2012–2018	Cork City	127	(4)
2019–2020	Sligo Rovers	26	(1)
2021	Finn Harps	20	(0)

International career
2008	Republic of Ireland U17		
2010	Republic of Ireland U19	3	(0)
2011	Republic of Ireland U21	2	(0)
- * Club domestic league appearances and goals as of 13:54, 8 September 2023 (UTC)

John Francis Dunleavy (born 3 July 1991) is an Irish former footballer who played as a defender.

== Career ==
Dunleavy joined Wolverhampton Wanderers academy in October 2006, rejecting the chance to join clubs such as Manchester United and Celtic, despite a very strong academic record. He signed a two-year professional contract near the end of the 2008–09 season during which the club were promoted to the Premier League.

In January 2011 he headed for a loan spell at League Two side Barnet, where he made his professional debut in a game against Southend. He made three appearances for the Bees as they battled relegation from the Football League before suffering ligament damage during training that ended his season.

He left Wolves in Summer 2011 after not being offered an extension to his contract. In late August 2011, Dunleavy joined Major League Soccer club Vancouver Whitecaps on trial until 7 September 2011.

In January 2012, Dunleavy joined Cork City where he captained the club for a number of seasons, however injuries curtailed most of his likely appearances.

Dunleavy signed for Sligo Rovers in December 2018 ahead of the 2019 campaign.

He signed for his home town club in 2021

== Career statistics ==
Professional appearances – correct as of 17 October 2020.

Club	Season	League			National Cup		League Cup		Europe		Other		Total	
Club	Season	Division	Apps	Goals	Apps	Goals	Apps	Goals	Apps	Goals	Apps	Goals	Apps	Goals
Wolverhampton Wanderers	2009–10	Premier League	0	0	0	0	0	0	—		—		0	0
Wolverhampton Wanderers	2010–11	Premier League	0	0	0	0	0	0	—		—		0	0
Barnet (loan)	2010–11	League Two	3	0	0	0	0	0	—		0	0	3	0
Cork City	2012	League of Ireland Premier Division	23	1	1	0	2	0	—		0	0	26	1
Cork City	2013	League of Ireland Premier Division	25	0	2	0	2	0	—		1 (Note: Appearances in Setanta Sports Cup)	0	30	0
Cork City	2014	League of Ireland Premier Division	31	1	3	0	3	0	—		0	0	37	1
Cork City	2015	League of Ireland Premier Division	20	0	4	0	0	0	2 (Note: Appearance(s) in UEFA Europa League)	0	1 (Note: Appearance in Munster Senior Cup)	0	27	0
Cork City	2016	League of Ireland Premier Division	13	0	1	0	1	0	0	0	2 (Note: One appearance in Munster Senior Cup, one appearance in President's Cup)	0	17	0
Cork City	2017	League of Ireland Premier Division	12	2	0	0	2	0	0	0	1	0	15	2
Cork City	2018	League of Ireland Premier Division	3	0	2	0	0	0	1	0	0	0	6	0
Cork City	Total		127	4	13	0	10	0	3	0	5	0	158	4
Sligo Rovers	2019	League of Ireland Premier Division	25	1	1	0	0	0	—		—		26	1
Sligo Rovers	2020	League of Ireland Premier Division	1	0	0	0	—		—		—		1	0
Sligo Rovers	Total		26	1	1	0	0	0	—		—		27	1
Career total			156	5	14	0	10	0	3	0	5	0	188	5

== Honours ==
Cork City

- League of Ireland Premier Division: 2017
- FAI Cup: 2016, 2017
- President's Cup: 2016, 2017, 2018
- Munster Senior Cup: 2016–17, 2017–18
