= 2016 Dundalk F.C. season =

Dundalk
2016 season
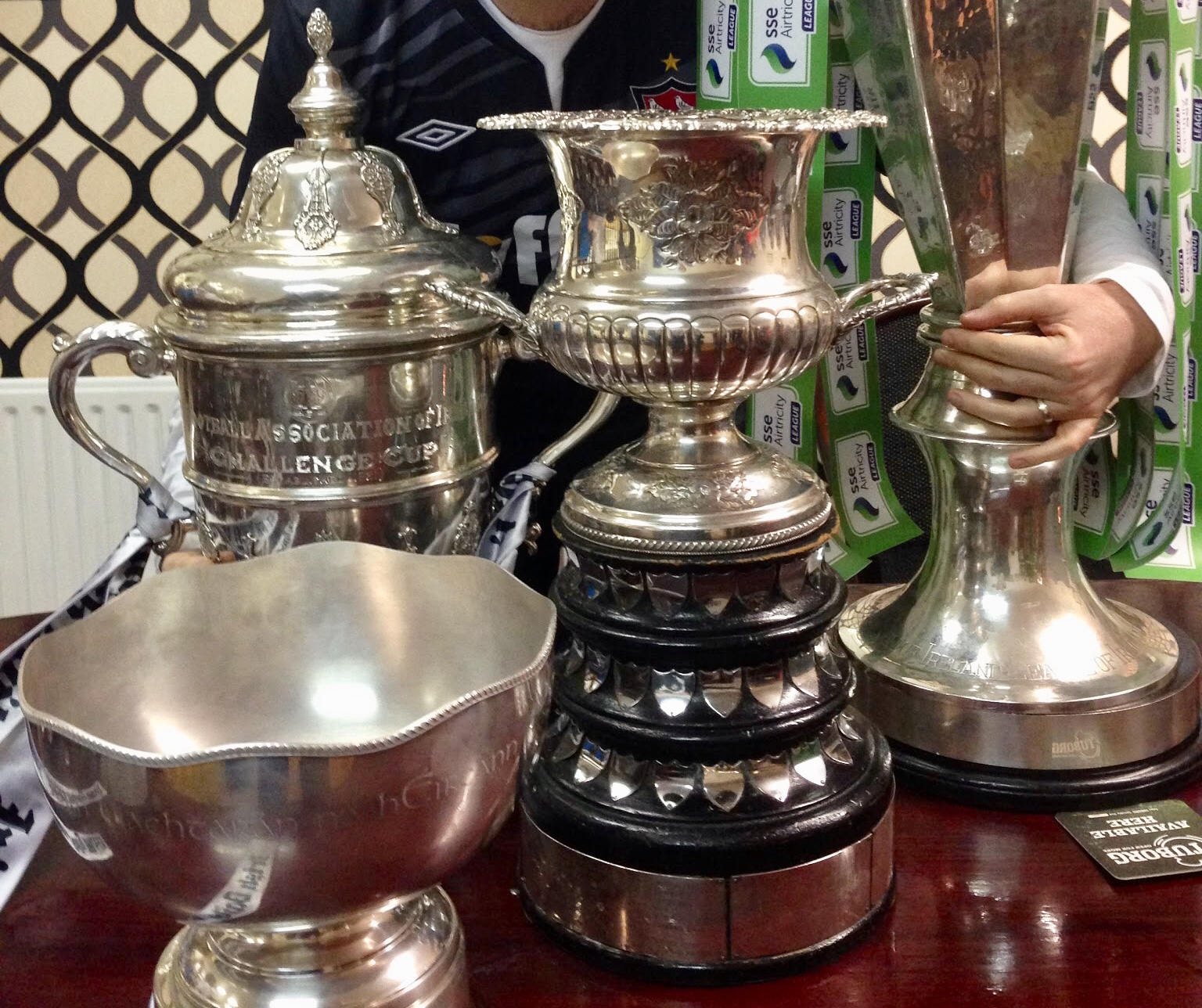
- President’s Cup, FAI Cup, Leinster Senior Cup & League of Ireland Champions trophy on display in Oriel Park in 2015
- Manager: Stephen Kenny
- Stadium: Oriel Park, Dundalk; Tallaght Stadium, Dublin (UEFA matches); Aviva Stadium, Dublin (v. Legia Warsaw)
- Premier Division: 1st (champions)
- FAI Cup: Runners-up
- League of Ireland Cup: Second round
- President's Cup: Runners-up
- Leinster Senior Cup: Quarter-final
- UEFA Champions League: Play-off round
- UEFA Europa League: Group stage
- Top goalscorer: League: David McMillan (16); All: David McMillan (21)
- Highest home attendance: 30,417 vs. Warsaw
- Lowest home attendance: TBD
- Average home league attendance: 2,717 (league games)
Home colours	Away colours

Dundalk entered the 2016 season as the reigning League Champions and FAI Cup holders from 2015, having won the 'Double' for the first time since 1987–88. 2016 was Stephen Kenny's third season at the club as manager. It was Dundalk's seventh consecutive season in the top tier of Irish football, their 80th in all, and their 89th in the League of Ireland.

== Season summary ==
After dominating domestically throughout the season, a third league title in a row was sealed with two games to spare in 2016, A chance at a 'Double Double' was spurned, however, when they lost in the FAI Cup Final to a goal scored in the last minute of extra time by Cork City F.C.

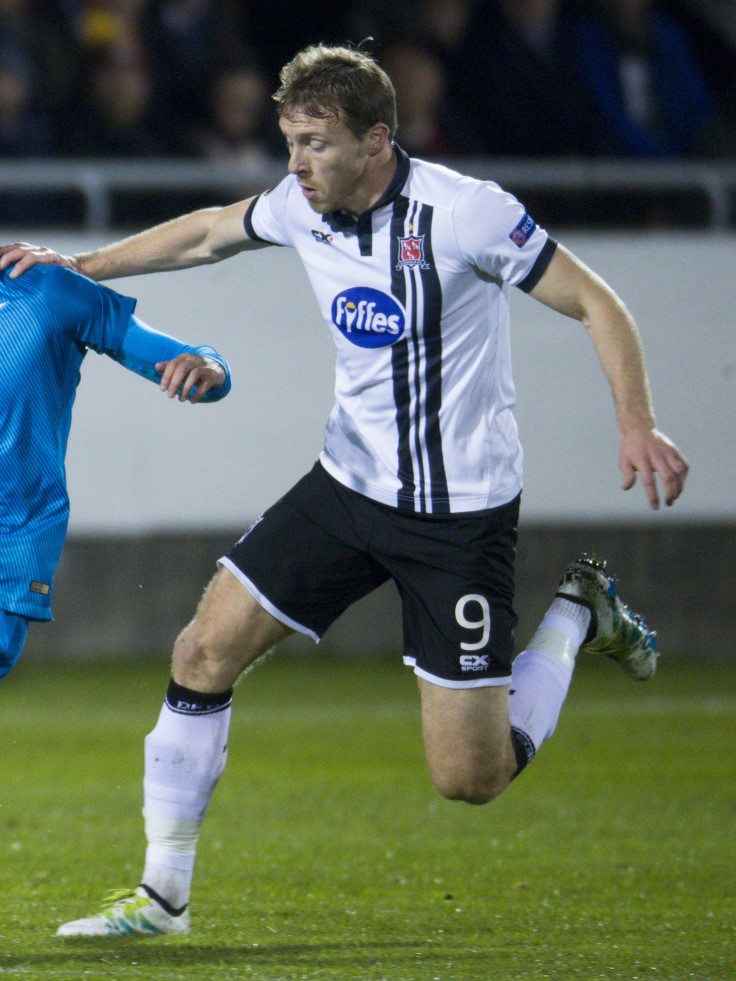
Dundalk forward David McMillan in action in the 2016–17 Europa League.

The 2016–17 Champions League saw the club qualify for the Champions League play-off round, after they first defeated FH of Iceland, then came from a goal down in the tie to defeat BATE 3–0 in Tallaght Stadium, winning through 3–1 on aggregate. Dundalk drew Legia Warsaw, with the first leg played in the Aviva Stadium in Dublin in front of a crowd of 30,417. They suffered a 2–0 defeat in the home leg, but shocked Legia in the return leg by taking a 1–0 lead through Robbie Benson's volley. With Dundalk pushing for the equaliser that would have taken the tie to extra-time, Legia scored on the break, and won the tie 3–1 on aggregate.

Defeat in the play-off round meant that the club qualified for the group stage of the Europa League, only the second Irish team to have done so. A draw with AZ Alkmaar in the Netherlands, followed by a victory over Maccabi Tel Aviv in Tallaght Stadium, were the first points earned by an Irish club at this stage of a European competition – both the equaliser in Alkmaar and the winning goal in Tallaght being scored by Ciarán Kilduff. In the third match they took the lead in Tallaght against Zenit St Petersburg, and were 20 minutes from topping the table, before eventually losing 2–1. In a campaign that would run from 13 July to 8 December, five weeks beyond the end of the domestic season, Dundalk failed to pick up any more points in the remaining matches. But they had attracted considerable attention.

== Squad ==
Note: Flags indicate national team as defined under FIFA eligibility rules; some limited exceptions apply. Players may hold more than one non-FIFA nationality.

No.	Pos.	Nation	Player
1	GK	IRL	Gary Rogers
2	DF	IRL	Sean Gannon
3	DF	IRL	Brian Gartland
4	DF	IRL	Andy Boyle (vice-captain)
5	MF	IRL	Chris Shields
6	MF	IRL	Stephen O'Donnell (captain)
7	MF	IRL	Daryl Horgan
8	MF	IRL	John Mountney
9	FW	IRL	David McMillan
10	MF	IRL	Ronan Finn
11	FW	IRL	Patrick McEleney
12	DF	IRL	Shane Grimes
14	DF	IRL	Dane Massey

No.	Pos.	Nation	Player
15	DF	IRL	Paddy Barrett
16	FW	IRL	Ciarán Kilduff
17	MF	IRL	George Poynton
18	MF	IRL	Robbie Benson
19	MF	NIR	Dean Shiels
20	FW	IRL	Ciarán O'Connor
21	MF	NIR	Darren Meenan
22	GK	ROU	Gabriel Sava
24	DF	IRL	Alan Keane
26	FW	IRL	Michael O'Connor
27	GK	IRL	Ben Kelly
28	MF	IRL	Keith Dalton
29	MF	IRL	Carlton Ubaezuono

== Non-competitive ==
=== Preseason friendlies ===
2 February 2016	Dundalk	4–1	Cliftonville	Dundalk
19:45		Report		Stadium: Oriel Park

9 February 2016	Dundalk	8–1	Waterford United	Dundalk
19:45		Report		Stadium: Oriel Park

13 February 2016	Limerick	0–2	Dundalk	Limerick
19:45		Report		Stadium: Markets Field

16 February 2016	Dundalk	2–0	UCD	Dundalk
19:45		Report		Stadium: Oriel Park

== Competitive ==
=== League of Ireland ===
5 March 2016 1	Bray Wanderers	1–3	Dundalk	Bray
				Stadium: Carlisle Grounds

11 March 2016 2	Dundalk	3–0	Finn Harps	Dundalk
				Stadium: Oriel Park

14 March 2016 3	Wexford Youths	1–2	Dundalk	Crossabeg
				Stadium: Ferrycarrig Park

18 March 2016 4	Dundalk	0–1	Cork City	Dundalk
				Stadium: Oriel Park

24 March 2016 5	St Patrick's Athletic	0–4	Dundalk	Inchicore
				Stadium: Richmond Park

1 April 2016 6	Dundalk	1–1	Derry City	Dundalk
				Stadium: Oriel Park

9 April 2016 7	Longford Town	0–4	Dundalk	Longford
				Stadium: Strokestown Road

15 April 2016 8	Dundalk	1–0	Sligo Rovers	Dundalk
				Stadium: Oriel Park

22 April 2016 9	Shamrock Rovers	0–2	Dundalk	Tallaght
				Stadium: Tallaght Stadium

29 April 2016 10	Bohemians	0–2	Dundalk	Phibsborough
				Stadium: Dalymount Park

6 May 2016 11	Dundalk	2–1	Galway United	Dundalk
				Stadium: Oriel Park

10 May 2016 12	Dundalk	1–0	Bray Wanderers	Dundalk
				Stadium: Oriel Park

13 May 2016 13	Finn Harps	0–7	Dundalk	Ballybofey
				Stadium: Finn Park

29 May 2016 14	Dundalk	3–2	Wexford Youths	Dundalk
				Stadium: Oriel Park

3 June 2016 15	Cork City	1–0	Dundalk	Cork
				Stadium: Turners Cross

24 June 2016 16	Dundalk	2–0	St Patrick's Athletic	Dundalk
				Stadium: Oriel Park

1 July 2016 17	Derry City	0–5	Dundalk	Derry
				Stadium: Brandywell Stadium

5 July 2016 18	Dundalk	4–3	Longford Town	Dundalk
				Stadium: Oriel Park

5 August 2016 19	Galway United	1–0	Dundalk	Galway
				Stadium: Eamonn Deacy Park

10 August 2016 20	Bray Wanderers	2–1	Dundalk	Bray
				Stadium: Carlisle Grounds

26 August 2016 21	Wexford Youths	0–1	Dundalk	Crossabeg
				Stadium: Ferrycarrig Park

2 September 2016 22	Bohemians	1–2	Dundalk	Phibsborough
				Stadium: Dalymount Park

6 September 2016 23	Sligo Rovers	0–1	Dundalk	Sligo
				Stadium: The Showgrounds

12 September 2016 24	Dundalk	2–0	Finn Harps	Dundalk
				Stadium: Oriel Park

20 September 2016 25	Dundalk	1–1	Shamrock Rovers	Dundalk
				Stadium: Oriel Park

26 September 2016 26	Dundalk	3–1	Derry City	Dundalk
				Stadium: Oriel Park

7 October 2016 27	Dundalk	0–3	Sligo Rovers	Dundalk
		Report		Stadium: Oriel Park

12 October 2016 28	Dundalk	2–1	Cork City	Dundalk
		Report		Stadium: Oriel Park

15 October 2016 29	Shamrock Rovers	0–3	Dundalk	Tallaght
		Report		Stadium: Tallaght Stadium

17 October 2016 30	Longford Town	0–3	Dundalk	Longford
		Report		Stadium: Strokestown Road

23 October 2016 31	Dundalk	2–1	Bohemians	Dundalk
		Report		Stadium: Oriel Park

25 October 2016 32	St Patrick's Athletic	5–2	Dundalk	Inchicore
				Stadium: Richmond Park

28 October 2016 33	Dundalk	4–1	Galway United	Dundalk
		Report		Stadium: Oriel Park

=== FAI Cup ===
20 May 2016 Second round	Dundalk	2–0	Shelbourne	Dundalk
	Horgan 21'; Kilduff 85'	Report	Kehoe (yellow card) 72'	Stadium: Oriel Park; Attendance: 1,750; Referee: Robert Rogers

19 August 2016 Third round	Dundalk	5–0	Crumlin United	Dundalk
19:45	Shields 8', 79'; Barrett 25'; Shiels 44'; O'Connor 74'	Report		Stadium: Oriel Park

9 September 2016 Quarterfinals	UCD	0–1	Dundalk	Dublin
19:45		Report	Kilduff 66'	Stadium: UCD Bowl

2 October 2016 Semifinals	Dundalk	2-2	Derry City	Dundalk
13:45	Dean Shiels, Ciaran Kilduff	Report	Rory Patterson, Ronan Curtis	Stadium: Oriel Park; Attendance: 3,283; Referee: Graham Kelly

4 October 2016 S/F Replay	Derry City	1-2	Dundalk	Dundalk
19:45	Ronan Curtis	Report	Ciaran Kilduff, Ronan Finn	Stadium: Oriel Park; Attendance: 3,000 (estimate); Referee: Dave McKeon

=== League of Ireland Cup ===
18 April 2016 Second round	Dundalk	0–1 (a.e.t.)	St Patrick's Athletic	Dundalk
19:45			Feely 113'	Stadium: Oriel Park

=== Leinster Senior Cup ===
5 February 2016 Fourth round	Shelbourne	0–2	Dundalk	Drumcondra
19:45				Stadium: Tolka Park

4 April 2016 Quarterfinals	Bohemians	4–3	Dundalk	Phibsborough
19:45	Murphy 31'; Byrne 69', 81', 87'	Report	O'Connor 13', 74'; Kelly 90'	Stadium: Dalymount Park; Attendance: 297; Referee: Michael O'Connor

=== President's Cup ===
27 February 2016	Cork City	2–0	Dundalk	Cork
	Holohan 20'; McNulty (yellow card) 45+1'; Morrissey (yellow card) 53'; Bolger (yellow card) 60'; Maguire 61'	Report	Shields (yellow card) 12'; Boyle (yellow card) 45+1'; Gartland (yellow card) 56' (red card) 80'	Stadium: Turners Cross; Attendance: 1,850; Referee: Graham Kelly

=== UEFA Champions League ===
==== Second qualifying round ====
13 July 2016 First leg	Dundalk (Republic of Ireland)	1–1	(Iceland) FH	Dundalk, Ireland
20:45	McMillan 66'; Finn (yellow card) 68'; O'Donnell (yellow card) 85'	Report	Doumbia (yellow card) 23'; Ólafsson (yellow card) 57'; Lennon 77'; Valdimarsson (yellow card) 81'	Stadium: Oriel Park; Attendance: 3,111; Referee: Nikola Popov

20 July 2016 Second leg	FH (Iceland)	2–2 (3–3 (a) agg.)	(Republic of Ireland) Dundalk	Hafnarfjörður, Iceland
20:45	Hewson 19' (yellow card) 42'; Pálsson (yellow card) 48'; K. F. Finnbogason 78'	Report	McMillan 52', 62'; O'Donnell (yellow card) 64'	Stadium: Kaplakriki; Attendance: 1,850; Referee: Paolo Valeri

==== Third qualifying round ====
26 July 2016 First leg	BATE Borisov (Belarus)	1–0	(Republic of Ireland) Dundalk	Barysaw, Belarus
20:45	Zhavnerchik (yellow card) 29'; Gordeichuk 70'	Report	Finn (yellow card) 64'	Stadium: Borisov Arena; Attendance: 11,321; Referee: Yevhen Aranovsky

2 August 2016 Second leg	Dundalk (Republic of Ireland)	3–0 (3–1 agg.)	(Belarus) BATE Borisov	Dublin, Ireland
20:45	McMillan 44', 59'; Barrett (yellow card) 88'; Benson 90'	Report	Rodionov (yellow card) 81'; Stasevich (yellow card) 89'	Stadium: Tallaght Stadium; Attendance: 4,645; Referee: Jakob Kehlet
Note: Dundalk played their third qualifying round home match at Tallaght Stadium, Dublin, and will play their play-off home match at Aviva Stadium, Dublin, instead of their regular stadium Oriel Park, Dundalk.

==== Play-off round ====
17 August 2016 First leg	Dundalk (Republic of Ireland)	0–2	(Poland) Legia Warsaw	Dublin, Ireland
20:45	O'Donnell (yellow card) 20'; Boyle (yellow card) 55'	Report	Odjidja-Ofoe (yellow card) 44'; Nikolić 56' (pen.); Hloušek (yellow card) 69'; Prijović 90+4'	Stadium: Aviva Stadium; Attendance: 30,417; Referee: Deniz Aytekin

23 August 2016 Second leg	Legia Warsaw (Poland)	1–1 (3–1 agg.)	(Republic of Ireland) Dundalk	Warsaw, Poland
20:45		Report		Stadium: Polish Army Stadium

=== UEFA Europa League ===
==== Group stage ====
15 September 2016 1	AZ (Netherlands)	1–1	(Republic of Ireland) Dundalk	Alkmaar, Netherlands
19:00	Wuytens 61'	Report	Kilduff 89'	Stadium: AFAS Stadion; Attendance: 10,003; Referee: Clayton Pisani (Malta)

29 September 2016 2	Dundalk (Republic of Ireland)	1–0	(Israel) Maccabi Tel Aviv	Dublin, Ireland
21:05	Kilduff 72'	Report		Stadium: Tallaght Stadium; Attendance: 5,543; Referee: Andris Treimanis (Latvia)

20 October 2016 3	Dundalk (Republic of Ireland)	1–2	(Russia) Zenit St. Petersburg	Dublin, Ireland
21:05	Benson 52'	Report	Mak 71'; Giuliano 77'	Stadium: Tallaght Stadium; Attendance: 5,500; Referee: Miroslav Zelinka (Czech Republic)

3 November 2016 4	Zenit St. Petersburg (Russia)	2–1	(Republic of Ireland) Dundalk	Saint Petersburg, Russia
19:00	Giuliano 42', 78'	Report	Horgan 52'	Stadium: Petrovsky Stadium; Attendance: 16,000; Referee: Luca Banti (Italy)

24 November 2016 5	Dundalk (Republic of Ireland)	0–1	(Netherlands) AZ	Dublin, Ireland
21:05	Weghorst 9'	Report		Stadium: Tallaght Stadium; Attendance: 5,500; Referee: István Vad (Hungary)

8 December 2016 6	Maccabi Tel Aviv (Israel)	2–1	(Republic of Ireland) Dundalk	Netanya, Israel
19:00	Ben Chaim 21' (pen.), Micha 38'	Report	Dasa 27' (o.g.)	Stadium: Netanya Stadium; Attendance: 9,891; Referee: Robert Schörgenhofer (Austria)

== Statistics ==
=== Appearances and goals ===
No.	Pos	Nat	Player	Total		League of Ireland		FAI Cup		League Cup		Europe			
No.	Pos	Nat	Player	Apps	Goals	Apps	Goals	Apps	Goals	Apps	Goals	Apps	Goals		
1	GK	(Republic of Ireland) IRL	Gary Rogers	36	0	28+0	0	0+0	0	0+0	0	8+0	0	0+0	0
2	DF	(Republic of Ireland) IRL	Sean Gannon	35	0	24+0	0	1+0	0	1+0	0	9+0	0	0+0	0
3	DF	(Republic of Ireland) IRL	Brian Gartland	32	7	27+0	7	1+0	0	0+0	0	4+0	0	0+0	0
4	DF	(Republic of Ireland) IRL	Andy Boyle	44	3	31+0	3	1+2	0	0+1	0	9+0	0	0+0	0
5	MF	(Republic of Ireland) IRL	Chris Shields	37	0	17+8	0	3+0	0	1+0	0	5+3	0	0+0	0
6	MF	(Republic of Ireland) IRL	Stephen O'Donnell	29	1	20+2	1	1+0	0	0+0	0	6+0	0	0+0	0
7	MF	(Republic of Ireland) IRL	Daryl Horgan	43	9	30+0	9	1+2	0	0+1	0	9+0	0	0+0	0
8	MF	(Republic of Ireland) IRL	John Mountney	40	2	21+8	2	2+0	0	1+0	0	5+3	0	0+0	0
9	FW	(Republic of Ireland) IRL	David McMillan	42	21	25+5	16	0+2	0	0+1	0	9+0	5	0+0	0
10	MF	(Republic of Ireland) IRL	Ronan Finn	39	8	28+1	7	1+0	1	0+0	0	8+1	0	0+0	0
11	FW	(Northern Ireland) NIR	Patrick McEleney	34	3	17+6	3	0+2	0	0+0	0	8+1	0	0+0	0
12	DF	(Republic of Ireland) IRL	Shane Grimes	7	0	2+1	0	3+0	0	1+0	0	0+0	0	0+0	0
14	DF	(Republic of Ireland) IRL	Dane Massey	39	3	29+0	3	0+0	0	1+0	0	9+0	0	0+0	0
15	DF	(Republic of Ireland) IRL	Paddy Barrett	24	2	7+7	2	3+0	0	1+0	0	5+1	0	0+0	0
16	FW	(Republic of Ireland) IRL	Ciarán Kilduff	31	11	8+11	6	3+0	3	1+0	0	0+8	2	0+0	0
17	MF	(Republic of Ireland) IRL	George Poynton	4	0	0+2	0	1+0	0	1+0	0	0+0	0	0+0	0
18	MF	(Republic of Ireland) IRL	Robbie Benson	35	5	10+12	2	2+1	0	1+0	0	4+5	3	0+0	0
19	FW	(Northern Ireland) NIR	Dean Shiels	11	1	0+7	0	2+0	1	0+0	0	0+2	0	0+0	0
20	FW	(Republic of Ireland) IRL	Ciarán O'Connor	4	0	0+3	0	1+0	0	0+0	0	0+0	0	0+0	0
21	MF	(Northern Ireland) NIR	Darren Meenan	26	1	10+14	1	1+0	0	0+0	0	0+1	0	0+0	0
22	GK	(Romania) ROU	Gabriel Sava	8	0	3+0	0	3+0	0	1+0	0	1+0	0	0+0	0
24	DF	(Republic of Ireland) IRL	Alan Keane	6	0	4+0	0	2+0	0	0+0	0	0+0	0	0+0	0
26	FW	(Republic of Ireland) IRL	Michael O'Connor	5	0	0+2	0	1+0	0	1+0	0	0+1	0	0+0	0
