= David McMillan (footballer) =

Irish footballer (born 1988)

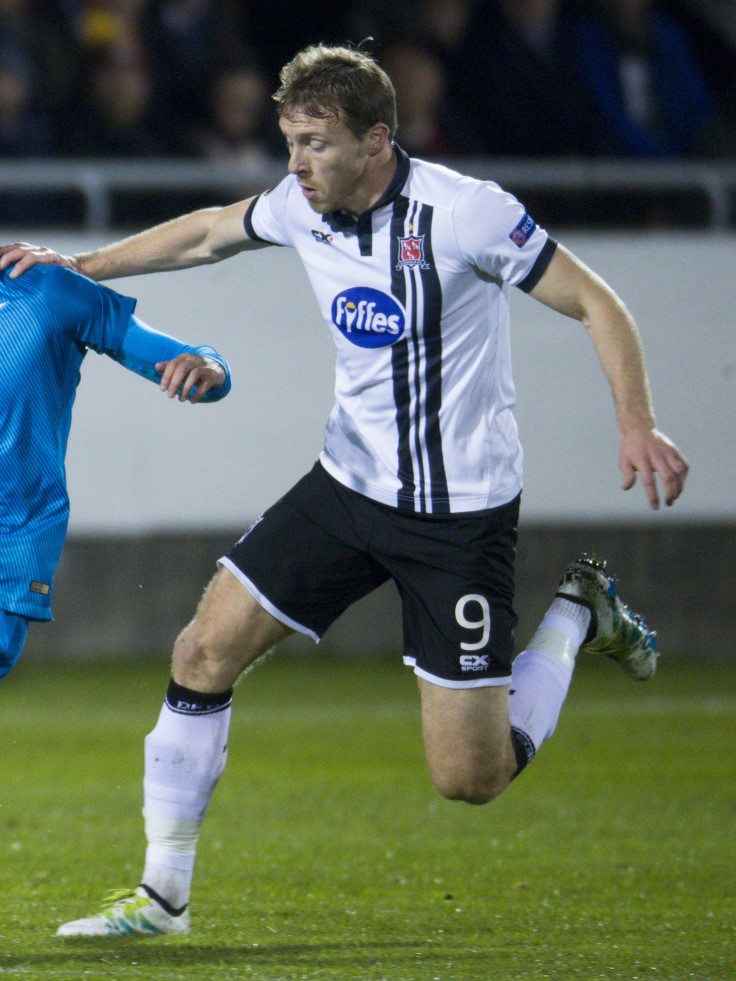

Personal information
- Full name: David McMillan
- Date of birth: 14 December 1988 (age 37)
- Place of birth: Templeogue, Ireland
- Height: 1.80 m (5 ft 11 in)
- Position: Forward

Youth career
- Templeogue United
- Mount Merrion Youths
- 2006–2008: UCD

Senior career*
| Years | Team | Apps | (Gls) |
| 2008–2010 | UCD | 56 | (20) |
| 2011 | St Patrick's Athletic | 28 | (6) |
| 2012 | Olympic | 3 | (3) |
| 2012–2013 | UCD | 34 | (20) |
| 2013 | Sligo Rovers | 13 | (1) |
| 2014–2017 | Dundalk | 118 | (51) |
| 2018–2020 | St Johnstone | 16 | (4) |
| 2019 | → Hamilton Academical (loan) | 8 | (0) |
| 2019–2020 | → Falkirk (loan) | 19 | (4) |
| 2020–2022 | Dundalk | 60 | (6) |

International career
| 2010 | Republic of Ireland U23 | 1 | (0) |
- * Club domestic league appearances and goals as of 11:04, 29 November 2022 (UTC)

David McMillan (born 14 December 1988) is an Irish former professional footballer who played as a forward for UCD over two spells, St Patrick's Athletic, Sligo Rovers, St Johnstone, Hamilton Academical, Falkirk and Dundalk over two spells. He is currently the League of Ireland's all-time leading scorer in the UEFA Champions League and was joint top-scorer in the 2016–17 UEFA Champions League qualifying phase and play-off round. McMillan has also been named League of Ireland Premier Division Player of the Month on three occasions.

His older brother, Evan McMillan was also a footballer and the pair were teammates at UCD, St Patrick's Athletic and Sligo Rovers. In addition to his football career, McMillan is also a qualified architect.

== Club career ==
=== Early years ===
Between 2000 and 2007, McMillan attended Wesley College, Dublin where he studied for his Leaving Cert. As a schoolboy he played for Templeogue United and Mount Merrion Youths. He initially attended UCD games when Templeogue United supplied the club with ballboys. Mount Merrion Youths were effectively UCD's schoolboy team and his brother Evan also played for them.

=== UCD ===
Between 2007 and 2010, McMillan attended University College Dublin on a sports scholarship and obtained a degree in architecture. He also played for University College Dublin A.F.C. at both intervarsity and national level. In 2006 McMillan and his brother Evan began playing for UCD in their Leinster Senior League team. McMillan subsequently progressed through the ranks into the senior team. He made his Premier Division debut during the 2008 season, coming on as a substitute in an away game against Cork City on 26 September. During his time at UCD he helped the club win three Collingwood Cups, two CUFL Premier Division titles, two A Championships and the 2009 League of Ireland First Division title. In the 2008 A Championship final, McMillan and his brother scored the two goals in an extra time win against Bohemians A. McMillan also scored 12 league goals during UCD's successful 2009 First Division season. In May 2010 McMillan was named League of Ireland Premier Division Player of the Month after he enjoyed a prolific run of form. McMillan scored against Dundalk, St Patrick's Athletic and Galway United. He also scored twice in a 6–0 win over Bray Wanderers.

In 2011 McMillan began studying at UCD for his master's degree in architecture. After spells with St Patrick's Athletic and Olympic F.C., McMillan also re-joined UCD A.F.C. midway through the 2012 season. His eight goals in 15 league appearances helped UCD avoid relegation. In 2013, he also helped UCD win the Collingwood Cup for a third time, scoring the only goal in the final against UCC.

=== St Patrick's Athletic ===
During the 2011 season McMillan played for St Patrick's Athletic where he once again linked up with his brother Evan. He made 13 league starts but also gained a reputation as a super-sub, adding 14 more appearances from the bench. He also played for St Pat's during their 2011–12 UEFA Europa League campaign, scoring in the second qualifying round against Shakhter Karagandy. On 10 October 2011, McMillan helped St Pat's win the 2011 Leinster Senior Cup, scoring in the final against Bohemians at Dalymount Park.

=== Olympic ===
In 2012 while studying for his master's degree in architecture, McMillan spent an Erasmus semester at the University of Queensland. He also played for Olympic F.C., scoring three goals for them in the Brisbane Premier League.

=== Sligo Rovers ===
In July 2013 McMillan signed for Sligo Rovers. McMillan scored on his debut for Rovers, a 3–1 defeat to Cork City. This proved to be his only goal in 13 league appearances over the remainder of the 2013 season. He also played for Rovers in their 2013–14 UEFA Champions League games against Molde FK. However having played for UCD in the early rounds, McMillan was cup-tied and he missed out on Rovers successful 2013 FAI Cup campaign.

=== Dundalk ===
In December 2013 McMillan signed for Dundalk. During the 2014 season he scored 15 goals and helped Dundalk win a League of Ireland double as the club won both the Premier Division title and the League of Ireland Cup. He also played for Dundalk in their 2014–15 UEFA Europa League campaign. In the 2015 season, McMillan scored 14 times as he helped Dundalk win a second double. This time Dundalk retained the Premier Division title and won the 2015 FAI Cup. In March 2015, after scoring four goals in six league games, McMillan won the League of Ireland Premier Division Player of the Month for a second time. In Dundalk's 2015–16 UEFA Champions League campaign, McMillan scored their only goal as they lost 2–1 on aggregate to BATE Borisov in the second qualifying round.

During Dundalk's 2016–17 UEFA Champions League campaign, McMillan scored three times against Fimleikafélag Hafnarfjarðar in the second qualifying round. In the third qualifying round he scored twice against BATE Borisov. McMillan goals secured a 3–1 aggregate win for Dundalk and guaranteed the club a place in the 2016–17 UEFA Europa League group stage. McMillan also became the League of Ireland's all-time leading scorer in the UEFA Champions League, overtaking Jason Byrne and Glen Crowe. After scoring two hat-tricks against Derry City and Longford Town in the 2016 Premier Division and scoring five goals in the UEFA Champions League, McMillan was named Premier Division Player of the Month for July 2016. McMillan was joint top-scorer in the 2016–17 UEFA Champions League qualifying phase and play-off round with five goals.

While playing for Dundalk, McMillan has also been employed as an architect by O'Brien Finucane Architects, a company based in Dawson Street, Dublin.

=== St Johnstone ===
McMillan signed a contract running to the summer of 2020 with Scottish Premiership club St Johnstone in December 2017. He made his debut on 27 January 2018, as a substitute at home to Partick Thistle, however he only lasted 21 minutes before having to go off injured. The hamstring injury he sustained kept him out for nearly three months. On 5 May 2018, McMillan scored his first goal for St Johnstone, in a 5–1 win away at Motherwell.

He moved on loan to Hamilton Academical in January 2019. On 4 September 2019, McMillan joined Falkirk on a season-long loan. McMillan left the Saints in July 2020.

=== Return to Dundalk ===
After two years in Scotland, McMillan signed again with Dundalk on 29 July 2020. He scored the winning goal against Inter Club d'Escaldes in the 2020 Europa 2nd qualifying round. Dundalk went on to qualify for the 2020–21 UEFA Europa League group stage and he scored two goals from the penalty spot in Dundalks 4-3 lost against Rapid Vienna at the Allianz Stadion. This equalled Glen Crowe's European record of 11 goals. On 6 December 2020, McMillan scored a hat-trick in the 2020 FAI Cup Final in a 4–2 win over Shamrock Rovers at the Aviva Stadium, becoming the third player ever to achieve the feat. He was part of the starting 11 as his side won the 2021 President's Cup, beating Shamrock Rovers on penalties after a 1–1 draw at Tallaght Stadium on 12 March 2021. He scored in both legs to help defeat Newtown A.F.C. and FCI Levadia Tallinn in the 2021–22 UEFA Europa Conference League qualifying phase and play-off round.

=== Retirement ===
On 23 February 2023, McMillan publicly announced his retirement from professional football at the age of 34, stating "I would never have dreamed of coming through and doing the things I did" during his career.

== International career ==
McMillan has represented the Republic of Ireland U23s at international level. On 28 September 2010, in a 2009–11 International Challenge Trophy away game against Estonia, McMillan came on as a late substitute for Daniel Kearns.

== Career statistics ==
As of match played on 6 November 2022

Club statistics
| Club | Season | League | | | National Cup (Note: Includes FAI Cup, FFA Cup & Scottish Cup) | | League Cup (Note: Includes League of Ireland Cup & Scottish League Cup) | | Europe | | Other | | Total | |
| Club | Season | Division | Apps | Goals | Apps | Goals | Apps | Goals | Apps | Goals | Apps | Goals | Apps | Goals |
|---|---|---|---|---|---|---|---|---|---|---|---|---|---|---|
| UCD | 2008 | LOI Premier Division | 1 | 0 | 0 | 0 | 0 | 0 | — | | — | | 1 | 0 |
| UCD | 2009 | LOI First Division | 32 | 12 | 1 | 0 | 2 | 1 | — | | — | | 35 | 13 |
| UCD | 2010 | LOI Premier Division | 23 | 8 | 1 | 1 | 0 | 0 | — | | 0 (Note: Appearances in Leinster Senior Cup) | 0 | 24 | 9 |
| St Patrick's Athletic | 2011 | LOI Premier Division | 28 | 6 | 3 | 2 | 1 | 0 | 5 (Note: Appearances in UEFA Europa League) | 1 | 5 (Note: 3 appearances 2 goals in Leinster Senior Cup, 2 appearances 1 goal in Setanta Sports Cup) | 3 | 42 | 12 |
| Olympic | 2012 | Brisbane Premier League | 3 | 3 | 3 | 0 | — | | — | | — | | 6 | 3 |
| UCD | 2012 | LOI Premier Division | 15 | 8 | 1 | 0 | 0 | 0 | — | | 0 | 0 | 16 | 8 |
| UCD | 2013 | LOI Premier Division | 19 | 12 | 1 | 0 | 0 | 0 | — | | 0 | 0 | 20 | 12 |
| UCD | UCD Total | | 90 | 40 | 4 | 1 | 2 | 1 | — | | 0 | 0 | 96 | 42 |
| Sligo Rovers | 2013 | LOI Premier Division | 13 | 1 | — | | 0 | 0 | 2 (Note: Appearances in UEFA Champions League) | 0 | — | | 15 | 1 |
| Dundalk | 2014 | LOI Premier Division | 24 | 7 | 4 | 1 | 4 | 5 | 4 | 0 | 6 (Note: 1 appearance 1 goal in Leinster Senior Cup, 5 appearances 1 goal in Setanta Sports Cup) | 2 | 42 | 14 |
| Dundalk | 2015 | LOI Premier Division | 33 | 12 | 3 | 0 | 1 | 0 | 2 | 1 | 3 (Note: 2 appearances 1 goal in Leinster Senior Cup, 1 appearance in President's Cup) | 1 | 42 | 14 |
| Dundalk | 2016 | LOI Premier Division | 31 | 16 | 4 | 0 | 1 | 0 | 12 (Note: 6 appearances 5 goals in UEFA Champions League and 6 appearances in UEFA Europa League) | 5 | 2 (Note: 1 appearance in Leinster Senior Cup, 1 appearance in President's Cup) | 0 | 50 | 21 |
| Dundalk | 2017 | LOI Premier Division | 30 | 16 | 6 | 5 | 2 | 1 | 2 | 1 | 0 | 0 | 40 | 23 |
| St Johnstone | 2017–18 | Scottish Premiership | 4 | 2 | 0 | 0 | 0 | 0 | 0 | 0 | — | | 4 | 2 |
| St Johnstone | 2018–19 | Scottish Premiership | 12 | 2 | 1 | 0 | 6 | 1 | — | | — | | 19 | 3 |
| St Johnstone | 2019–20 | Scottish Premiership | 0 | 0 | — | | 3 | 0 | — | | — | | 3 | 0 |
| St Johnstone | St Johnstone Total | | 16 | 4 | 1 | 0 | 9 | 1 | — | | — | | 26 | 5 |
| Hamilton Academical (loan) | 2018–19 | Scottish Premiership | 8 | 0 | — | | — | | — | | — | | 8 | 0 |
| Falkirk (loan) | 2019–20 | Scottish League One | 19 | 4 | 3 | 0 | — | | — | | 0 | 0 | 22 | 4 |
| Dundalk | 2020 | LOI Premier Division | 11 | 0 | 5 | 8 | — | | 7 (Note: 1 appearance in UEFA Champions League, 6 appearances & 3 goals in UEFA Europa League) | 3 | — | | 23 | 11 |
| Dundalk | 2021 | LOI Premier Division | 21 | 4 | 2 | 0 | — | | 6 (Note: Appearances in UEFA Europa Conference League) | 3 | 1 (Note: Appearance in President's Cup) | 0 | 30 | 7 |
| Dundalk | 2022 | LOI Premier Division | 28 | 2 | 3 | 1 | — | | — | | — | | 31 | 3 |
| Dundalk | Dundalk Total | | 178 | 57 | 27 | 15 | 8 | 6 | 33 | 13 | 12 | 3 | 268 | 80 |
| Career total | | | 355 | 115 | 41 | 19 | 20 | 8 | 40 | 14 | 17 | 6 | 473 | 162 |

== Honours ==
=== Club ===
Dundalk

- League of Ireland Premier Division: 3
  - 2014, 2015, 2016
- FAI Cup: 2
  - 2015, 2020
- League of Ireland Cup: 2
  - 2014, 2017
- President's Cup: 1
  - 2021

UCD

- League of Ireland First Division: 1
  - 2009
- A Championship: 2
  - 2008, 2010
- Collingwood Cup: 3
  - 2009, 2010, 2013
- CUFL Premier Division: 2
  - 2007–08, 2009–10

St Patrick's Athletic

- Leinster Senior Cup: 1
  - 2011

=== Individual ===
- League of Ireland Premier Division Player of the Month: 3
  - May 2010
  - March 2015
  - July 2016
- PFAI Team of the Year: 2
  - 2016, 2017
