= Gabriel Sava =

Romanian footballer (born 1986)

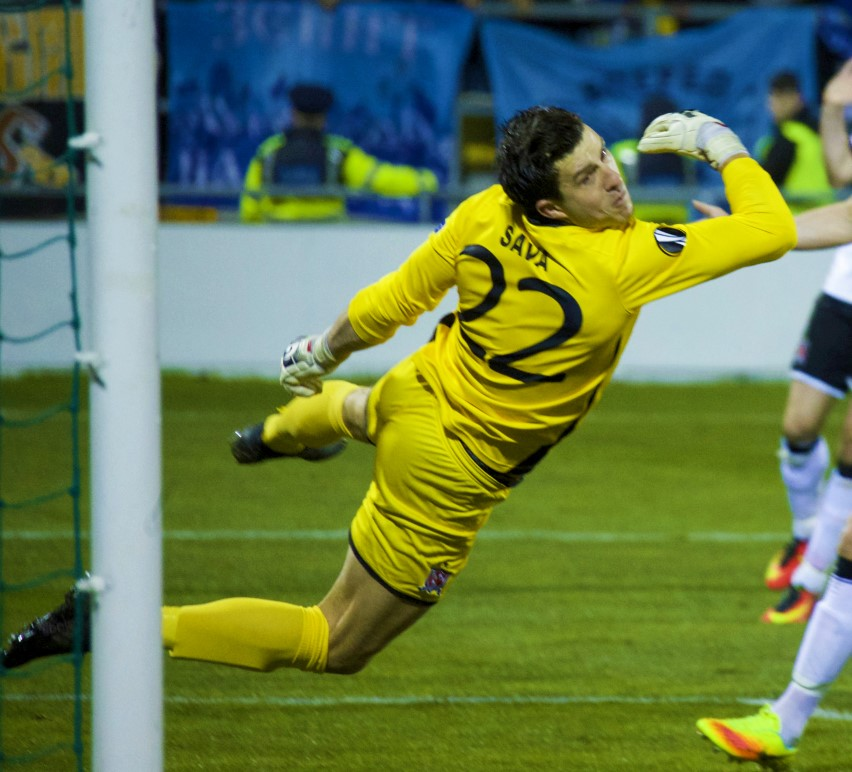

Personal information
- Date of birth: 15 September 1986 (age 40)
- Place of birth: Bacău, Romania
- Height: 1.88 m (6 ft 2 in)
- Position: Goalkeeper

Youth career
- Lazio
- Albion Rovers
- Drogheda United

Senior career*
Years	Team	Apps	(Gls)
2008	Bray Wanderers	0	(0)
2009	Drogheda United	0	(0)
2010–2011	Monaghan United	63	(0)
2012–2013	Drogheda United	50	(0)
2014–2018	Dundalk	14	(0)
2019	Bray Wanderers	24	(0)
2020–2021	Warrenpoint Town	22	(0)
- * Club domestic league appearances and goals

Gabriel Sava (born 15 October 1986) is a Romanian former professional footballer who played as a goalkeeper.

He was born in Bacău and played youth football for Lazio, before beginning a career in Ireland in 2001. Throughout his career there, he has played for Drogheda Town, Bray Wanderers, Monaghan United, Drogheda United, Dundalk and Bray Wanderers. He has made three appearances in the UEFA Europa League throughout his career and was a member of Dundalk's squad when they became the first Irish side to reach the play-off round of the UEFA Champions League in August 2016.

== Early life ==
Sava was born in Bacău, Romania and raised in Rome, Italy. He played youth football for Lazio. In 2001, his family were invited to visit some Italian friends living in Dublin, and his brother was offered a job as a chef at their restaurant in Drogheda. Sava decided to move to Drogheda along with his brother. His first club in Ireland was Albion Rovers before signing for Drogheda United U17s under the management of Paddy Mooney.

== Career ==
=== Drogheda Town ===
After leaving the youth teams of Drogheda United, Sava began playing non-league football with Drogheda Town. He impressed many with a good performance in the 2008 FAI Cup Third Round for Drogheda Town against Bohemians which gave him a platform to launch a career in the League of Ireland. Bohemians were 3−0 winners on the day, but Sava was named man of the match, and in July 2008 Bray Wanderers signed him for the remainder of the season.

=== Bray Wanderers ===
Sava was third-choice goalkeeper behind Alan Gough and Chris O'Connor for the 2008 season. He was restricted to just two friendly games against Millwall and Leeds United, as well as four appearances as an unused substitute.

=== Drogheda United ===
Sava was signed by Paul Doolin for Drogheda United before the 2009 season, however his first-team opportunities were extremely limited due to the form of Dan Connor and Mikko Vilmunen. In addition to this, Sava suffered a wrist injury that kept him out of action for eight months.

=== Monaghan United ===
In February 2010, Sava signed for First Division side Monaghan United. He kept seven clean sheets in his first seven games for the club, and established himself as first-choice goalkeeper under manager Mick Cooke, making 61 league appearances over the next two seasons. In 2010, Sava played in the League of Ireland Cup final, a game Monaghan lost 1−0 to Sligo Rovers. In 2011, he helped the club to promotion from the First Division.

=== Return to Drogheda United ===
In December 2011, Sava left Monaghan to follow his ex-boss, Mick Cooke, and return to Drogheda United. He made his debut on the opening night of the 2012 season and made 29 league appearances as Drogheda finished second in the Premier Division behind Sligo Rovers. Sava also picked up a League Cup winner's medal as Drogheda overcame Shamrock Rovers in the final. His form throughout the season was rewarded when he was named RTÉ Monday Night Soccer's Goalkeeper of the Year, and nominated for the Airtricity/Irish Soccer Writers Goalkeeper of the Year award. At the end of the season, Sava went on trial to BK Häcken for a time.

Sava re-signed for Drogheda for the 2013 season and made a further 20 league appearances for the club. He also played in Drogheda's Setanta Cup final defeat to Shamrock Rovers and in both legs of the Europa League First Qualifying Round tie against Malmö FF of Sweden. However, he fell out of favour in the latter months of the season and was on the bench for the 2013 League Cup and FAI Cup finals.

=== Dundalk ===
Sava left Drogheda at the end of the 2013 season and on 7 January 2014 he was signed for County Louth rivals Dundalk by Stephen Kenny. Sava failed to make an appearance in the league throughout the 2014 season as Peter Cherrie remained first-choice at the club, however he started every game in Dundalk's League Cup campaign which ended with a 3−2 victory over Shamrock Rovers in the final. He also added another medal to his collection as Dundalk won the Premier Division title on the last day of the season. Sava signed a new contract for the 2015 season and went on to make three league appearances for the club, keeping two clean sheets, as Dundalk once more won the Premier Division title. In 2016, Sava again found himself second-choice behind Gary Rogers, thus missing out on the chance to appear in their Champions League qualifiers as they reached the play-off round. After a number of high-profile errors from Rogers, most notably against Sligo Rovers in a 3−0 defeat on 8 October 2016, Sava was handed a start in the crucial top-of-the-table match with Cork City and kept a clean sheet.

=== Bray Wanderers ===
On 16 December 2018 Sava re-signed for First Division side Bray Wanderers. He made his debut on 23 February in a 3–0 win over Cabinteely. A week later Sava saved a penalty in a match against Limerick with the score at 0–0, Bray went on to win 2–0. On 1 April Bray beat Shamrock Rovers 4–2 on penalties in the EA Sports Cup after the match ended 0–0 with Sava producing a man of the match performance including a save in the shoot out. Sava made 24 league appearances over the course of the season, as Bray disappointingly missed out on the playoffs.

=== Warrenpoint Town ===
On 12 February 2020 it was announced that Sava had signed for NIFL Premiership side Warrenpoint Town. He was released at the end of the 2020/21 season.

=== Coaching ===
In 2023, Sava joined League of Ireland First Division side Longford Town as goalkeeping coach in a role he served until the end of the 2025 season.

== Honours ==
Drogheda United

- League of Ireland Cup: 2012

Dundalk

- League of Ireland Premier Division: 2014, 2015, 2016, 2018
- FAI Cup: 2015, 2018
- League of Ireland Cup: 2014
- President's Cup: 2015
