= 2017 President of Ireland's Cup =

- Event: President's Cup
Cork City	Dundalk
3	0
- Date: 17 February 2017
- Venue: Turner's Cross, Cork
- Referee: Anthony Buttimer
- Attendance: 3,140

The 2017 President's Cup was the fourth President's Cup contested for.

== Overview ==
The match was played between 2016 League of Ireland Premier Division champions Dundalk and 2016 FAI Cup winners Cork City on 17 February 2017, at Turners Cross. Cork City won the game 3–0, with goals from Seán Maguire, Kevin O'Connor and Karl Sheppard, making Cork City the first team to retain the trophy. This was the second successive match between the sides, and Dundalk's third successive appearance in the competition.

== Match ==
=== Summary ===
Sean Maguire opened the scoring for Cork City in the 15th minute when Garry Buckley hit a long pass over the top which Maguire received and ran at Paddy Barrett before running to the left and firing low left footed thru the legs of Dundalk goalkeeper Gabriel Sava from a tight angle. Kevin O’Connor got the second goal of the game in the 68th minute when he curled left footed into the left corner of the net from a free-kick on the left just outside the penalty box. Sheppard got the third goal for Cork City in injury time when he cut in from the right and hit a low right footed shot from inside the six yard box into the corner of the net.

17 February 2017
19:45

Cork City	3 - 0	Dundalk
Maguire 15'; O'Connor 68'; Sheppard 90+5'	Report

Turners Cross
Attendance: 3,140
Referee: Anthony Buttimer

== See also ==
- 2017 FAI Cup
- 2017 League of Ireland Premier Division
