= 2026 President of Ireland's Cup =

- Event: President's Cup
Derry City	Shamrock Rovers
1	0
- Date: 31 January 2026
- Venue: Tallaght Stadium, Tallaght
- Referee: Kevin O'Sullivan (Cork)
- Attendance: 4,711

The 2026 President's Cup was the twelfth edition of the President's Cup contested for. The match was played on 31 January between the champions of the 2025 League of Ireland Premier Division and 2025 FAI Cup winners, Shamrock Rovers and League of Ireland Premier Division runners-up Derry City.

Derry City won the match 1-0 with a goal from Darragh Markey in the 33rd minute, a shot on the half-volley high to the net after a cross from James McClean from the left broke to him.

== Details ==
31 January 2026
17:00 GMT

Shamrock Rovers	0–1	Derry City
	Report	Markey 33'

Tallaght Stadium
Attendance: 4,711
Referee: Kevin O'Sullivan

Shamrock Rovers	Derry City

== See also ==
- 2026 League of Ireland Premier Division
- 2026 FAI Cup
