= 2017 FAI Cup final =

- Event: 2017 FAI Cup
Cork City	Dundalk
1	1
- Cork City won 5–3 on penalties
- Date: 5 November 2017
- Venue: Aviva Stadium, Dublin
- Referee: Paul McLaughlin
- Attendance: 24,210

The 2017 FAI Cup final was the final match of the 2017 FAI Cup, the national association football cup of the Republic of Ireland. The match took place on Sunday 5 November 2017 at the Aviva Stadium in Dublin, and was contested by Cork City and Dundalk. The match was a repeat of the 2015, and 2016 finals.

The match was broadcast live on RTÉ Two and RTÉ Two HD in Ireland, and via the RTÉ Player worldwide with commentary from George Hamilton.

Cork City won on penalties after the game finished 1–1, including extra time, with Kieran Sadlier scoring the winning penalty.

== Match ==
=== Summary ===
After a 0-0 draw in 90 minutes, Niclas Vemmelund opened the scoring for Dundalk in the fifth minute of extra-time with a header into the top corner after a free-kick by Michael Duffy from the right. Cork City were level in the 111th minute when Achille Campion chested the ball down before volleying low to the left corner with his left foot in off Gary Rogers. The game went to a penalty shoot out. Sheppard, McMillan, Bolger, O’Donnell, McCormack, Benson and Beattie all scored before Michael Duffy's penalty was saved by Cork City goalkeeper Mark McNulty with Kieran Sadlier scoring the winning penalty for Cork City, shooting low to left corner of the net.

The win completed the first league and cup double for Cork City in their history. It was also the third year in a row that the final went to extra-time.

=== Details ===
5 November 2017
15:30

Dundalk	1–1 (a.e.t.)	Cork City
N. Vemmelund 95'	Report	A. Campion 111'
Penalties
	3–5

Aviva Stadium, Dublin
Attendance: 24,210
Referee: Paul McLaughlin
