= Sean Maguire (footballer) =

Irish footballer (born 1994)

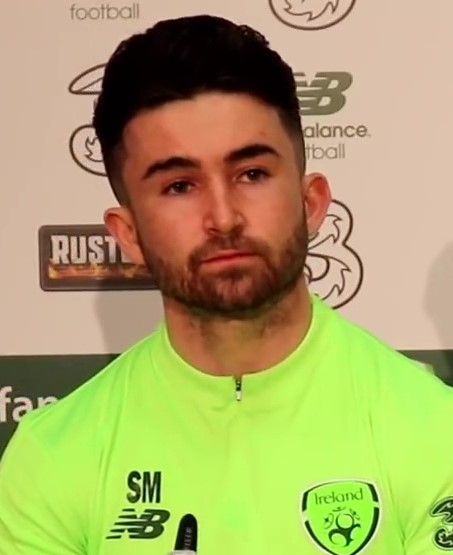
- Maguire with Republic of Ireland in 2019

Personal information
- Full name: Sean Patrick Maguire
- Date of birth: 1 May 1994 (age 32)
- Place of birth: Luton, England
- Height: 5 ft 9 in (1.75 m)
- Position: Forward

Team information
- Current team: Cork City
- Number: 24

Senior career*
Years	Team	Apps	(Gls)
2011–2012	Waterford United	32	(14)
2013–2015	West Ham United	0	(0)
2014	→ Sligo Rovers (loan)	18	(1)
2014–2015	→ Accrington Stanley (loan)	33	(7)
2015	Dundalk	6	(0)
2016–2017	Cork City	51	(38)
2017–2023	Preston North End	159	(22)
2023	Coventry City	7	(0)
2023–2024	Carlisle United	32	(2)
2024–	Cork City	61	(31)

International career^{‡}
2012	Republic of Ireland U19	3	(0)
2015–2016	Republic of Ireland U21	12	(3)
2017–2020	Republic of Ireland	11	(1)
- * Club domestic league appearances and goals as of 16:35, 10 November 2026 (UTC) ‡ National team caps and goals as of 00:24, 19 February 2025 (UTC)

Sean Patrick Maguire (born 1 May 1994) is a professional footballer who plays as a striker, for League of Ireland First Division club Cork City. Born in England, he represents the Republic of Ireland national team.

== Club career ==
=== Waterford United ===
Maguire started his career at Waterford United, making his debut in July 2011 against Mervue United. During his career at Waterford he scored 14 goals in 32 games. Waterford's chairman, John O'Sullivan said of Maguire, "I'm a great fan of Lionel Messi at Barcelona. When I look at Seanie, he really reminds me of him." Maguire finished as top scorer in the 2012 League of Ireland First Division.

=== West Ham United ===
In January 2013 Maguire signed for West Ham United on a two-and-a-half-year contract. In January 2014 he was an unused substitute in West Ham's 5–0 FA Cup defeat by Nottingham Forest. He was released by West Ham at the end of the 2014–15 season.

==== Sligo Rovers loan ====
In February 2014 Maguire signed on loan for Sligo Rovers. Maguire made his debut for Sligo on 24 February in a 4–1 away win in the Setanta Cup against Crusaders. His only goal for the club came on 27 July in a 2–0 home win against Limerick The loan period which lasted until August 2014 and included two Europa League qualifying games against Rosenborg.

==== Accrington Stanley loan ====
In September 2014, Maguire joined Accrington Stanley on loan, making his football league debut against Northampton Town on 20 September, scoring his first goal and Accrington's fifth in a 5–4 victory. In December 2014, Maguire returned to West Ham at the end of the loan. He had scored four goals in 13 games. On 24 December, although his return to West Ham had been announced, Accrington extended his loan until 18 January 2015.

=== Cork City ===
After half a season at Dundalk, where he won a Leinster Senior Cup medal but did not make the matchday squad for the FAI Cup Final, Maguire signed for Cork City on 9 December 2015. On 27 February Maguire scored in his first competitive game for City, in the 2016 President's Cup final against former club Dundalk. A week later, Maguire scored twice in a 2–0 win over Bohemians on his league debut for Cork. He finished the season as the league's top scorer with 18 goals, and he also scored the late winner as Cork beat Dundalk 1–0 in the FAI Cup. On 3 June 2017, it was reported that Maguire had agreed a transfer to Preston North End by the end of July 2017. On 6 July 2017, Maguire scored a hat-trick against Levadia Tallinn in the second leg of their first qualifying round of the 2017–18 UEFA Europa League at Turners Cross to become Cork City's leading goalscorer in European competition.

=== Preston North End ===
On 3 June 2017, Cork and Preston agreed a deal for Maguire to join Preston at the end of July. He signed a three-year deal with the club, with Cork City describing the fee as "an appropriate but undisclosed compensation package." Maguire made his competitive debut for Preston on the opening day of the Championship season, playing 74 minutes before being substituted, against Sheffield Wednesday. His first competitive goal for Preston came against Barnsley on 9 September. Maguire returned from a hamstring injury in March to score two goals off the bench as Preston beat Bolton Wanderers 3–1 on 3 March. He continued his comeback from injury with another goal from the bench against Bristol City as he netted the winner in a 2–1 win at Deepdale Stadium.

=== Coventry City ===
On 26 January 2023, with his North End contract set to expire at the end of the season, Maguire left Deepdale to sign for fellow Championship club Coventry City on a permanent deal until the end of the season.

=== Carlisle United ===
On 29 July 2023, Maguire signed a one-year contract with EFL League One club Carlisle United. He was released when his contract expired.

=== Return to Cork City ===
On 6 August 2024, when the club were competing in the 2024 League of Ireland First Division, Maguire returned to Cork City on a multi-year contract. On 6 September 2024, he was part of the side that defeated UCD 1–0 at the UCD Bowl to win promotion by winning the 2024 League of Ireland First Division. On 3 October 2025, Maguire opened the scoring in his side's FAI Cup Semi Final win over St Patrick's Athletic to help earn his side a place in the final. Maguire scored 5 goals in 24 games in the league in 2025 as his side finished bottom of the table and were relegated back to the First Division. On 9 November 2025, he was part of the starting 11 in the 2025 FAI Cup final as his side were beaten 2–0 by Shamrock Rovers at the Aviva Stadium. Following the club's relegation, Maguire drew interest from Shamrock Rovers, Derry City and Bohemians ahead of the 2026 season, but Cork City informed the clubs and Maguire that he was not for sale, with his contract running until the end of 2027. In February 2026, he extended his contract with the club by a further season, until the end of 2028. On 4 September 2026, he scored in a 1–1 draw away to Bray Wanderers, a result that secured the 2026 League of Ireland First Division title and promotion back to the Premier Division.

== International career ==
Despite being born in Luton, making him eligible to play either for England or the Republic of Ireland, Maguire opted to play for Ireland, having grown up in Kilkenny, where his parents returned when he was a couple of months old.

=== Youth ===
On 25 March 2015, Maguire was called up for Ireland's under-21 team for a match against Andorra under-21 team in Wexford on 26 March 2015. Ireland won the game, 1–0 with Maguire making his debut as a substitute.

=== Senior ===
Maguire was named in Ireland's preliminary 39-man squad for the World Cup qualifiers against Georgia and Serbia in August 2017, however he was cut from the final squad. He was again named in Ireland's preliminary squad for the final two qualifiers against Moldova and Wales, this time making the final squad. Maguire made his debut for Ireland against Moldova in October 2017, coming on for Shane Long towards the end of the match. Maguire scored his only goal for Ireland on 14 November 2019, in a 3–1 win against New Zealand.

== Career statistics ==
=== Club ===
As of match played on 16 October 2026

Appearances and goals by club, season and competition
Club	Season	League			National cup		League cup		Other		Total	
Club	Season	Division	Apps	Goals	Apps	Goals	Apps	Goals	Apps	Goals	Apps	Goals
Waterford	2011	LOI First Division	8	1	1	0	0	0	0	0	9	1
Waterford	2012	LOI First Division	24	13	1	0	1	1	4 (Note: Appearances in 2012 League of Ireland play-offs)	0	30	14
Waterford	Total		32	14	2	0	1	1	4	0	39	15
West Ham United	2012–13	Premier League	0	0	0	0	0	0	–		0	0
West Ham United	2013–14	Premier League	0	0	0	0	0	0	–		0	0
West Ham United	2014–15	Premier League	0	0	0	0	0	0	–		0	0
West Ham United	Total		0	0	0	0	0	0	–		0	0
Sligo Rovers (loan)	2014	LOI Premier Division	18	1	1	0	1	0	2 (Note: Appearances in UEFA Europa League)	0	22	1
Accrington Stanley (loan)	2014–15	League Two	33	7	0	0	0	0	0	0	33	7
Dundalk	2015	LOI Premier Division	6	0	2	1	0	0	0	0	8	1
Cork City	2016	LOI Premier Division	30	18	4	7	2	0	7 (Note: Six appearances in UEFA Europa League; one appearance in President of Ireland's Cup)	4	43	29
Cork City	2017	LOI Premier Division	21	20	0	0	1	0	5 (Note: Four appearances in the UEFA Europa League; one appearance in the President of Ireland's Cup)	4	27	24
Cork City	Total		51	38	4	7	3	0	12	8	70	53
Preston North End	2017–18	Championship	24	10	0	0	1	0	–		25	10
Preston North End	2018–19	Championship	26	3	1	0	0	0	–		27	3
Preston North End	2019–20	Championship	44	5	0	0	0	0	–		44	5
Preston North End	2020–21	Championship	29	3	1	0	3	1	–		33	4
Preston North End	2021–22	Championship	26	1	1	0	4	1	–		31	2
Preston North End	2022–23	Championship	10	0	0	0	0	0	–		10	0
Preston North End	Total		159	22	3	0	8	2	–		170	24
Coventry City	2022–23	Championship	7	0	–		–		0	0	7	0
Carlisle United	2023–24	League One	32	2	1	0	1	0	1 (Note: Appearance in EFL Trophy)	0	35	2
Cork City	2024	LOI First Division	8	7	1	0	–		–		9	7
Cork City	2025	LOI Premier Division	24	5	4	2	–		1 (Note: Appearance(s) in the Munster Senior Cup)	0	29	7
Cork City	2026	LOI First Division	29	19	0	0	–		0	0	29	19
Cork City	Total		61	31	5	2	–		1	0	67	33
Career total			399	116	18	10	14	3	20	8	451	136

=== International ===
Appearances and goals by national team and year
National team	Year	Apps	Goals
Republic of Ireland	2017	1	0
Republic of Ireland	2018	3	0
Republic of Ireland	2019	4	1
Republic of Ireland	2020	3	0
Total		11	1

Scores and results list the Republic of Ireland's goal tally first

No.	Date	Venue	Opponent	Score	Result	Competition
1.	14 November 2019	Aviva Stadium, Dublin, Ireland	New Zealand	2–1	3–1	Friendly

== Honours ==
Sligo Rovers

- Setanta Cup: 2014

Dundalk

- League of Ireland Premier Division: 2015
- FAI Cup: 2015
- Leinster Senior Cup: 2015

Cork City

- League of Ireland Premier Division: 2017
- League of Ireland First Division: 2024
- FAI Cup: 2016
- President of Ireland's Cup: 2016, 2017
- Munster Senior Cup: 2017

Individual

- PFAI Young Player of the Year: 2016
- PFAI Premier Division Team of the Year (2): 2016, 2017
- PFAI First Division Team of the Year (2): 2012, 2026
- League of Ireland Premier Division Player of the Month: March 2017

== See also ==
- List of Republic of Ireland international footballers born outside the Republic of Ireland
