= 2018 President of Ireland's Cup =

2017 President of Ireland's Cup
- Event: President's Cup
Cork City	Dundalk
4	2
- Date: 11 February 2018
- Venue: Oriel Park, Dundalk
- Referee: Derek Tomney

The 2018 President's Cup was the fifth President's Cup contested for. The match was played between the champions of 2017 League of Ireland Premier Division and 2017 FAI Cup, Cork City and the runners-up of the 2017 FAI Cup, Dundalk on 11 February 2018, at Oriel Park. Cork City won the game 4-2 in a match played during snow showers.

== Match ==
11 February 2018

Cork City	4 - 2	Dundalk
	Report

Oriel Park
Attendance: 3,000
Referee: Derek Tomney

== See also ==
- 2018 FAI Cup
- 2018 League of Ireland Premier Division
