= 2016 FAI Cup final =

- Event: 2016 FAI Cup
Cork City	Dundalk
1	0
- Date: 6 November 2016
- Venue: Aviva Stadium, Dublin
- Referee: Rob Rogers
- Attendance: 26,400

The 2016 FAI Cup final was the final match of the 2016 FAI Cup, the national association football cup of the Republic of Ireland. The match took place on 6 November 2016 at the Aviva Stadium in Dublin, and wascontested between Cork City and Dundalk. The match was a repeat of the 2015 FAI Cup Final. Cork City won the game 1-0 after extra time with a late winning goal.

Cork City won the match with a late goal from Maguire in the last minute of extra-time. Maguire received the ball with his back to goals in the penalty box after a throw-in from the right. Shooting low with his left foot, the ball took a slight deflection before rolling into the far left corner of the net.

The match was broadcast live on RTÉ Two and RTÉ Two HD in Ireland, and via the RTÉ Player worldwide with commentary from George Hamilton.

== Match ==
6 November 2016	Cork City	1–0 (a.e.t.)	Dundalk	Dublin
15:40 GMT	Maguire 120'	Report		Stadium: Aviva Stadium; Attendance: 26,400; Referee: Rob Rogers
