= 2014 League of Ireland Premier Division =

League of Ireland Premier Division
- Season: 2014
- Champions: Dundalk (10th title)
- Relegated: Athlone Town; UCD
- Champions League: Dundalk
- Europa League: Cork City; St. Patrick's Athletic; Shamrock Rovers; UCD
- Matches: 198
- Goals: 528 (2.67 per match)
- Top goalscorer: Christy Fagan: 20 (St. Patrick's Athletic)
- Highest attendance: 6,219 Cork City 1–0 Bohemians F.C.
- Total attendance: 295,384
- Average attendance: 1,523 (Note: Four attendance figures are missing from the 2014 season https://www.researchgate.net/figure/League-of-Ireland-Premier-Division-Attendance_tbl1_286919999)

The 2014 League of Ireland Premier Division was the 30th season of the League of Ireland Premier Division. The division featured 12 teams. Dundalk were champions and Cork City finished as runners-up.

== Teams ==
=== Stadia and locations ===
Locations of Premier Division teams
Locations of Dublin Premier Division teams

Team	Location	Stadium
Athlone Town	Athlone	Athlone Town Stadium
Bohemians	Phibsborough	Dalymount Park
Bray Wanderers	Bray	Carlisle Grounds
Cork City	Cork	Turners Cross
Derry City	Derry	Brandywell Stadium
Drogheda United	Drogheda	United Park
Dundalk	Dundalk	Oriel Park
Limerick	Limerick	Thomond Park
Shamrock Rovers	Tallaght	Tallaght Stadium
Sligo Rovers	Sligo	The Showgrounds
St Patrick's Athletic	Inchicore	Richmond Park
UCD	Belfield	UCD Bowl

=== Personnel and kits ===
Note: Flags indicate national team as has been defined under FIFA eligibility rules. Players may hold more than one non-FIFA nationality.

Team	Manager	Captain	Kit manufacturer	Shirt sponsor
Athlone Town	~~Mick Cooke~~; ~~Keith Long~~	(Republic of Ireland) Aidan Collins	Nike	Nitro Sports
Bohemians	Owen Heary	(Republic of Ireland) Dave Mulcahy	Macron	Mr Green
Bray Wanderers	Alan Mathews	(Republic of Ireland) Danny O'Connor	Macron	Volkswagen
Cork City	John Caulfield	(Republic of Ireland) John Dunleavy	Umbro	Clonakilty Sausages
Derry City	~~Roddy Collins~~; Peter Hutton	(Republic of Ireland) Barry Molloy	Umbro	Diamond Corrugated
Drogheda United	~~Robbie Horgan~~; Damien Richardson	(Republic of Ireland) Gavin Brennan	Nike	Scotch Hall Shopping Center
Dundalk	Stephen Kenny	(Republic of Ireland) Stephen O'Donnell	Umbro	Fyffes
Limerick	~~Stuart Taylor~~; Martin Russell	(Republic of Ireland) Shane Duggan	Macron	Pacdog.ie
Shamrock Rovers	~~Trevor Croly~~; Pat Fenlon	(Republic of Ireland) Conor Kenna	Warrior	Pepper
Sligo Rovers	~~Ian Baraclough~~; ~~John Coleman~~; Gavin Dykes	(Republic of Ireland) Gavin Peers	Umbro	Volkswagen
St Patrick's Athletic	Liam Buckley	(Republic of Ireland) Ger O'Brien	Umbro	Clune Construction Company L.P.
UCD	Aaron Callaghan	(Republic of Ireland) Robbie Benson	O'Neills	O'Neills

== Overview ==
The 2014 Premier Division featured 12 teams. Each team played each other three times, for a total of 33 games each. The regular season began 7 March and concluded 24 October. Dundalk won the title on the final day of the season with a 2-0 win at home against Cork City. It was the first time Dundalk had won the Premier Division since 1994–95.

== Final Table ==
Pos	Team	Pld	W	D	L	GF	GA	GD	Pts	Qualification or relegation
1	Dundalk (C)	33	22	8	3	73	24	+49	74	Qualification for Champions League second qualifying round
2	Cork City	33	22	6	5	51	25	+26	72	Qualification for Europa League first qualifying round
3	St Patrick's Athletic	33	19	8	6	66	37	+29	65	Qualification for Europa League first qualifying round
4	Shamrock Rovers	33	18	8	7	43	26	+17	62	Qualification for Europa League first qualifying round
5	Sligo Rovers	33	12	7	14	44	36	+8	43	
6	Limerick	33	12	5	16	37	45	−8	41	
7	Bohemians	33	9	13	11	40	41	−1	40	
8	Derry City	33	9	11	13	42	41	+1	38	
9	Drogheda United	33	10	6	17	40	63	−23	36	
10	Bray Wanderers	33	5	11	17	28	61	−33	26	
11	UCD (R)	33	6	7	20	27	71	−44	25	Qualification for relegation play-off and Europa League first qualifying round (Note: UCD qualified for the UEFA Europa League via the UEFA Respect Fair Play ranking system. After the FAI finished third in the 2014–15 rankings, they nominated UCD for the extra European place.)
12	Athlone Town (R)	33	4	10	19	35	56	−21	22	Relegation to League of Ireland First Division

Rules for classification: 1) points; 2) goal difference; 3) number of goals scored.
(C) Champions; (R) Relegated

== Results ==
=== Matches 1–22 ===
Home \ Away	ATH	BOH	BRW	COR	DER	DRO	DUN	LIM	SHM	SLI	StP	UCD
Athlone Town	—	1–3	0–0	0–3	0–1	6–0	0–1	3–0	1–4	0–2	0–2	2–0
Bohemians	2–2	—	1–1	0–2	1–1	2–2	0–2	0–1	1–3	0–2	1–1	0–0
Bray Wanderers	1–1	0–5	—	0–2	0–0	1–3	1–0	1–0	0–3	1–0	1–3	3–5
Cork City	1–0	1–1	3–1	—	2–0	3–1	1–2	3–0	3–0	1–1	1–1	2–1
Derry City	3–2	4–0	5–0	0–1	—	2–0	2–2	0–0	0–1	1–0	0–0	1–1
Drogheda United	3–2	1–0	0–2	0–1	1–1	—	4–1	1–4	2–3	1–2	0–4	4–0
Dundalk	2–0	1–1	5–1	4–0	3–0	7–0	—	2–1	2–2	3–0	0–0	5–2
Limerick	2–1	1–2	0–0	1–2	0–4	0–1	1–2	—	4–1	0–3	2–0	2–1
Shamrock Rovers	1–0	0–0	2–1	0–2	1–1	0–1	0–1	1–1	—	1–0	2–1	2–0
Sligo Rovers	2–1	3–2	3–0	0–0	2–2	1–1	0–1	2–0	0–1	—	2–2	5–0
St Patrick's Athletic	4–0	3–1	3–2	3–2	5–2	6–0	1–4	1–1	1–0	1–0	—	3–2
UCD	2–1	0–3	0–0	0–1	1–6	2–1	1–4	1–1	0–2	1–0	1–1	—

Legend: Blue = home team win; Yellow = draw; Red = away team win.

=== Matches 23–33 ===
Home \ Away	ATH	BOH	BRW	COR	DER	DRO	DUN	LIM	SHM	SLI	StP	UCD
Athlone Town	—	0–0	1–1	0–2	—	—	0–3	—	1–1	—	—	—
Bohemians	—	—	2–1	—	2–1	2–1	—	2–0	1–1	2–2	—	—
Bray Wanderers	—	—	—	—	1–1	—	1–1	—	—	0–1	2–4	2–0
Cork City	—	1–0	1–1	—	—	2–1	—	—	1–0	2–1	1–0	—
Derry City	1–1	—	—	0–1	—	—	—	1–2	—	2–1	0–1	0–1
Drogheda United	1–1	—	1–1	—	1–0	—	1–1	—	0–2	—	2–3	—
Dundalk	—	3–2	—	2–0	5–0	—	—	1–0	0–0	—	—	—
Limerick	4–2	—	4–1	0–1	—	0–3	—	—	—	1–0	—	—
Shamrock Rovers	—	—	1–0	—	2–0	—	—	1–0	—	1–0	—	3–0
Sligo Rovers	3–1	—	—	—	—	0–2	—	—	—	—	1–4	4–0
St Patrick's Athletic	0–2	3–1	—	—	—	—	1–0	0–1	1–1	—	—	3–2
UCD	1–1	0–0	—	0–4	—	1–0	0–2	1–3	—	—	—	—

Legend: Blue = home team win; Yellow = draw; Red = away team win.

== Promotion/relegation playoff ==
UCD, the eleventh placed team from the Premier Division played off against Galway, the winner of the 2014 First Division play off, to decide who would play in the 2015 Premier Division.

27 October 2014	UCD	1 – 2	Galway	UCD Bowl
19:45	Timmy Molloy 18'; Colm Crowe (yellow card) 27'; Gareth Matthews (yellow card) 39'	Report	Jason Molloy (yellow card) 23'; Paddy Barrett 89'; Ryan Manning 90'	Attendance: 643; Referee: James McKell

31 October 2014	Galway	3 – 0	UCD	Eamonn Deacy Park
20:45	Alex Byrne (yellow card) 20'; Gary Shanahan 45'; Ryan Manning 71'; Alex Byrne 80'	Report		Attendance: 2,890; Referee: Dave McKeon

Galway won 5–1 on aggregate and were promoted to the Premier Division. UCD are relegated to the First Division.

== Top scorers ==
Rank	Player	Club	Goals
1	Christy Fagan	St Patrick's Athletic	20
1	Patrick Hoban	Dundalk	20
3	Conan Byrne	St Patrick's Athletic	18
4	Rory Gaffney	Limerick	14
5	Billy Dennehy	Cork City	13
5	Daniel Corcoran	Bohemians	13

== Awards ==
=== Player of the Month ===
Month	Player	Club
March	Gary O'Neill	Drogheda United
April	Christopher Forrester	St Patrick's Athletic
May	Daryl Horgan	Dundalk
June	Mark O'Sullivan	Cork City
July	Richie Towell	Dundalk
August	Rory Gaffney	Limerick
September	Dane Massey	Dundalk
October	Patrick Hoban	Dundalk
November	Christy Fagan	St Patrick's Athletic

=== PFAI Players' Player of the Year ===
Winner	Club
Christy Fagan	St Patrick's Athletic

=== PFAI Young Player of the Year ===
Winner	Club
Daryl Horgan	Dundalk

=== Team of the Year ===
No.	Pos.	Player	Date of birth (age)	Caps	Club
1	GK	Mark McNulty			Cork City
2	DF	Seán Gannon			Dundalk
3	DF	Andy Boyle			Dundalk
4	DF	Brian Gartland			Dundalk
5	DF	Ian Bermingham			St Patrick's Athletic
6	MF	Colin Healy			Cork City
7	MF	Daryl Horgan			Dundalk
8	MF	Richie Towell			Dundalk
9	FW	Christy Fagan			St Patrick's Athletic
10	FW	Patrick Hoban			Dundalk
11	FW	Mark O'Sullivan			Cork City

== Television coverage ==
The rights to 10 games was awarded to Setanta Sports while RTÉ Two will also show games during the season. MNS on RTÉ Two was the highlights programme between 2008 and 2013 but in 2014 it was replaced by a new programme called Soccer Republic which will show match highlights and analysis on each Monday night during the season and will also include UEFA Champions League highlights.

== Attendances ==
#	Football club	Average attendance
1	Cork City FC	3,777
2	Dundalk FC	2,534
3	Shamrock Rovers	2,319
4	Sligo Rovers	2,087
5	Bohemians FC	1,480
6	St. Patrick's Athletic FC	1,359
7	Derry City FC	1,298
8	Drogheda United	1,023
9	Limerick FC	865
10	Bray Wanderers	855
11	Athlone Town AFC	682
12	UCD AFC	431

== See also ==
- 2014 League of Ireland Cup
- 2014 League of Ireland First Division
- 2014 St Patrick's Athletic F.C. season
