= 2016 President of Ireland's Cup =

- Event: President's Cup
Cork City	Dundalk
2	0
- Date: 27 February 2016
- Venue: Turners Cross
- Referee: Tomas Connolly
- Attendance: 1,850

The 2016 President's Cup was the third President's Cup contested for. The match was played between 2015 League of Ireland Premier Division champions Dundalk and 2015 FAI Cup runners-up Cork City on 27 February 2016, at Turners Cross. Cork City won the match 2-0, taking the lead in the 20th minute through Gavan Holohan and doubled the advantage in the second half through Sean Maguire’s header.

== Match ==
27 February 2016
14:00

Cork City	2 - 0	Dundalk
Holohan 20'; Maguire 61'	Report

Turners Cross
Attendance: 1,850
Referee: T Connolly

== See also ==
- 2016 FAI Cup
- 2016 League of Ireland Premier Division
