= 2015 League of Ireland Premier Division =

League of Ireland Premier Division
- Season: 2015
- Champions: Dundalk (11th title)
- Relegated: Limerick; Drogheda United
- Champions League: Dundalk
- Europa League: Cork City; St. Patrick's Athletic; Shamrock Rovers
- Matches: 198
- Goals: 548 (2.77 per match)
- Top goalscorer: Richie Towell: 25 (Dundalk)
- Biggest home win: Dundalk 8-1 Bray Wanderers (4 May 2015)
- Biggest away win: Bray Wanderers 0-5 Galway United (25 April 2015)
- Highest scoring: Dundalk 8-1 Bray Wanderers (4 May 2015)
- Highest attendance: 6,900
- Total attendance: 324,332 (Note: Total attendance figures based upon reported 9.8% increase from the 2014 season https://www.newstalk.com/sport/league-of-ireland-match-attendances-show-encouraging-rise-for-2015-627173)
- Average attendance: 1,638

The 2015 League of Ireland Premier Division was the 31st season of the League of Ireland Premier Division. Dundalk were champions and Cork City finished as runners-up.

== Teams ==
=== Stadia and locations ===
Locations of Premier Division teams
Locations of Dublin Premier Division teams

Team	Location	Stadium
Bohemians	Phibsborough	Dalymount Park
Bray Wanderers	Bray	Carlisle Grounds
Cork City	Cork	Turners Cross
Derry City	Derry	Brandywell Stadium
Drogheda United	Drogheda	United Park
Dundalk	Dundalk	Oriel Park
Galway United	Galway	Eamonn Deacy Park
Limerick	Limerick	Markets Field
Longford Town	Longford	City Calling Stadium
Shamrock Rovers	Tallaght	Tallaght Stadium
Sligo Rovers	Sligo	The Showgrounds
St Patrick's Athletic	Inchicore	Richmond Park

=== Personnel and kits ===
Note: Flags indicate national team as has been defined under FIFA eligibility rules. Players may hold more than one non-FIFA nationality.

Team	Manager	Captain	Kit manufacturer	Shirt sponsor
Bohemians	(Republic of Ireland) Keith Long	(Republic of Ireland) Derek Pender	Hummel	Mr Green
Bray Wanderers	~~(Republic of Ireland) Alan Mathews~~; ~~(Poland) Maciej Tarnogrodzki~~; ~~(Republic of Ireland) David Cassidy~~; ~~(Republic of Ireland) Trevor Croly~~; ~~(Republic of Ireland) David Cassidy~~ (Republic of Ireland) Mick Cooke	(Republic of Ireland) David Cassidy	Nike	Royal Hotel
Cork City	(Republic of Ireland) John Caulfield	(Republic of Ireland) John Dunleavy	Nike	Clonakilty Sausages
Derry City	~~(Northern Ireland) Peter Hutton~~ (Republic of Ireland) Paul Hegarty	(Northern Ireland) Ryan McBride	Umbro	Diamond Corrugated
Drogheda United	~~(Republic of Ireland) John McDonnell~~ (Republic of Ireland) Mark Kinsella	(Republic of Ireland) Michael Daly	Nike	Scotch Hall Shopping Center
Dundalk	(Republic of Ireland) Stephen Kenny	(Republic of Ireland) Stephen O'Donnell	Umbro	Fyffes
Galway United	(Republic of Ireland) Tommy Dunne	(Republic of Ireland) Paul Sinnott	Macron	Comer Property Management
Limerick	(Republic of Ireland) Martin Russell	(Republic of Ireland) Shane Duggan	Macron	Galtee Fuels
Longford Town	(Republic of Ireland) Tony Cousins	(Republic of Ireland) Mark Salmon	Macron	City Calling
Shamrock Rovers	(Republic of Ireland) Pat Fenlon	(Republic of Ireland) Conor Kenna	Warrior	Pepper
Sligo Rovers	~~(Republic of Ireland) Owen Heary~~; ~~(Cameroon) Joseph N'Do & (Republic of Ireland) Gavin Dykes~~ (England) Micky Adams	(Republic of Ireland) Gavin Peers	Umbro	Volkswagen
St Patrick's Athletic	(Republic of Ireland) Liam Buckley	(Republic of Ireland) Ger O'Brien	Umbro	Clune Construction Company L.P.

== Overview ==
The 2015 Premier Division consisted of 12 teams. Each team played each other three times for a total of 33 games. The season began on 6 March and concluded on 30 October. On 9 October, with three games still remaining, Dundalk retained the title after a 1–1 draw with Shamrock Rovers.

== Final table ==
Pos	Team	Pld	W	D	L	GF	GA	GD	Pts	Qualification or relegation
1	Dundalk (C)	33	23	9	1	78	23	+55	78	Qualification for Champions League second qualifying round (Note: Dundalk qualified for the Europa League first qualifying round by winning the 2015 FAI Cup. However, since they already qualified for European competition based on their league position, the spot awarded to the cup winners was passed down the league.)
2	Cork City	33	19	10	4	57	25	+32	67	Qualification for Europa League first qualifying round
3	Shamrock Rovers	33	18	11	4	56	27	+29	65	Qualification for Europa League first qualifying round
4	St Patrick's Athletic	33	18	4	11	52	34	+18	58	Qualification for Europa League first qualifying round
5	Bohemians	33	15	8	10	49	42	+7	53	
6	Longford Town	33	10	9	14	41	53	−12	39	
7	Derry City	33	9	8	16	32	42	−10	35	
8	Bray Wanderers	33	9	6	18	27	51	−24	33	
9	Sligo Rovers	33	7	10	16	39	55	−16	31	
10	Galway United	33	9	4	20	39	61	−22	31	
11	Limerick (R)	33	7	8	18	46	73	−27	29	Qualification for relegation play-off
12	Drogheda United (R)	33	7	7	19	32	62	−30	28	Relegation to League of Ireland First Division

Source: League of Ireland, Soccerway
Rules for classification: 1) Points; 2) Goal difference; 3) Goals scored.
(C) Champions; (R) Relegated

== Results ==
=== Matches 1–22 ===
Home \ Away	BOH	BRW	COR	DER	DRO	DUN	GAL	LIM	LON	SHM	SLI	StP
Bohemians	—	0–0	1–1	4–2	0–1	0–3	2–0	2–1	2–0	3–1	1–0	0–1
Bray Wanderers	0–1	—	0–1	1–0	0–1	0–1	0–5	4–0	0–1	0–3	1–0	1–0
Cork City	4–0	1–0	—	3–0	4–1	1–2	2–0	5–0	2–0	0–0	3–2	3–1
Derry City	1–2	0–0	0–2	—	3–0	0–1	0–2	0–0	3–0	0–0	1–1	0–3
Drogheda United	0–1	4–2	1–2	1–1	—	1–2	2–0	1–1	0–3	0–1	3–2	0–2
Dundalk	1–2	8–1	1–1	1–0	1–0	—	3–0	6–2	1–0	2–0	3–0	3–0
Galway United	5–3	0–1	1–3	1–2	1–0	2–4	—	3–2	1–2	1–2	0–1	1–4
Limerick	0–3	0–1	0–1	0–2	1–2	1–1	2–4	—	2–2	1–1	3–2	1–2
Longford Town	2–1	2–0	1–4	0–0	1–1	0–2	0–1	1–0	—	0–2	1–1	2–2
Shamrock Rovers	0–0	1–0	0–0	4–1	1–0	2–2	3–0	4–1	3–2	—	5–1	1–0
Sligo Rovers	0–0	1–3	1–1	1–1	2–0	1–2	1–1	1–1	3–2	1–2	—	0–3
St Patrick's Athletic	3–1	3–0	0–0	2–0	2–2	0–2	3–1	3–1	3–0	0–0	3–0	—

Legend: Blue = home team win; Yellow = draw; Red = away team win.

=== Matches 23–33 ===
Home \ Away	BOH	BRW	COR	DER	DRO	DUN	GAL	LIM	LON	SHM	SLI	StP
Bohemians	—	—	0–1	—	—	2–2	3–0	—	1–1	—	—	2–0
Bray Wanderers	3–1	—	0–0	—	1–0	—	1–1	2–2	—	2–2	—	—
Cork City	—	—	—	0–0	—	2–2	1–0	2–3	2–3	—	—	—
Derry City	2–3	3–1	—	—	0–2	0–2	—	—	—	1–0	—	—
Drogheda United	2–2	—	1–1	—	—	—	—	1–4	0–3	—	0–4	—
Dundalk	—	4–0	—	—	6–0	—	0–0	—	0–0	—	2–2	4–1
Galway United	—	—	—	0–4	1–1	—	—	1–3	4–2	—	2–1	0–1
Limerick	4–3	—	—	0–2	—	1–3	—	—	3–3	0–2	—	3–1
Longford Town	—	1–0	—	4–2	—	—	—	—	—	1–3	1–1	0–3
Shamrock Rovers	1–1	—	3–0	—	5–3	1–1	2–0	—	—	—	—	0–2
Sligo Rovers	0–2	3–2	0–2	1–0	—	—	—	2–3	—	1–1	—	—
St Patrick's Athletic	—	1–0	1–2	0–1	2–1	—	—	—	—	—	0–2	—

Legend: Blue = home team win; Yellow = draw; Red = away team win.

== Top scorers ==
Rank	Player	Club	Goals
1	(Republic of Ireland) Richie Towell	Dundalk	25
2	(Republic of Ireland) Karl Sheppard	Cork City	13
3	(Republic of Ireland) Vinny Faherty	Limerick	12
3	(United States) Jake Keegan	Galway United	12
3	(Republic of Ireland) Enda Curran	Galway United	12
3	(Republic of Ireland) Michael Drennan	Shamrock Rovers	12
3	(Republic of Ireland) David McMillan	Dundalk	12
3	(Republic of Ireland) Daniel Corcoran	Sligo Rovers	12
9	(Republic of Ireland) Christopher Forrester	St Patrick's Athletic	11
9	(Republic of Ireland) Brandon Miele	Shamrock Rovers	11

== Awards ==
=== Team of the Year ===
No.	Pos.	Player	Date of birth (age)	Caps	Club
1	GK	Micheál Schlingermann			Drogheda United
2	DF	Seán Gannon			Dundalk
3	DF	Brian Gartland			Dundalk
4	DF	Andy Boyle			Dundalk
5	DF	Dane Massey			Dundalk
6	MF	Richie Towell			Dundalk
7	MF	James Chambers			St Patrick's Athletic
8	MF	Stephen O'Donnell			Dundalk
9	FW	Brandon Miele			Shamrock Rovers
10	FW	Mark O'Sullivan			Cork City
11	FW	Daryl Horgan			Dundalk

== Promotion/relegation playoff ==
Limerick, the eleventh placed team from the Premier Division played off against Finn Harps, the winner of the 2015 First Division play off, to decide who would play in the 2016 Premier Division.

2 November 2015	Limerick	1–0	Finn Harps	Markets Field
	Kelly 34'	Report		Referee: Rob Rogers

6 November 2015	Finn Harps	2–0 (a.e.t.) (2–1 agg.)	Limerick	Finn Park
	Funston 38'; Banda 117'			Attendance: 3,200; Referee: Derek Tomney

Finn Harps won 2–1 on aggregate and were promoted to 2016 Premier Division. Limerick are relegated to the 2016 First Division.

== See also ==
- 2015 League of Ireland Cup
- 2015 League of Ireland First Division
- 2015 St Patrick's Athletic F.C. season
