= 2017 FAI Cup =

FAI Senior Challenge Cup

Tournament details
- Country: Ireland

Final positions
- Champions: Cork City (4th title)
- Runners-up: Dundalk

Tournament statistics
- Matches played: 40
- Goals scored: 133 (3.33 per match)

The 2017 FAI Cup, known as the Irish Daily Mail FAI Cup for sponsorship reasons, was the 97th edition of the Republic of Ireland's primary domestic association football cup competition. The winners of this season's tournament earned a place in the 2018–19 Europa League and would have entered in the first qualifying round.

Cork City were the defending champions and went on to retain the cup after a 5–3 win on penalties against Dundalk in the final on 5 November.

The tournament began the weekend of 30 April 2017 with the preliminary round, which was contested by sixteen non-league clubs.

== Teams ==
Round	Clubs remaining	Clubs involved	Winners from previous round	New entries this round	Leagues entering at this round
Preliminary round	40	16	N/A	16	Leinster Senior League; Munster Senior League; Best Western Southern Hotel Super League
First round	32	32	8	24	League of Ireland; Leinster Senior League
Second round	16	16	16	none	none
Quarter-Finals	8	8	8	none	none
Semi-Finals	4	4	4	none	none
Final	2	2	2	none	none

== Preliminary round ==
The draw for the preliminary round was held 15 March 2017.

30 April 2017	Ballymun United	1–1 (a.e.t.) (3–5 p)	Killester United

30 April 2017	Bangor Celtic	3–2 (a.e.t.)	Cherry Orchard

30 April 2017	College Corinthians	0–1	Ballincollig A.F.C.

30 April 2017	Edenderry Town	0–1	Cobh Wanderers

30 April 2017	Evergreen	2–2 (a.e.t.) (4–3 p)	St. Mary's

30 April 2017	Everton	1–1 (a.e.t.) (5–3 p)	Liffey Wanderers

30 April 2017	Greystones United	0–3	Sheriff Y.C.

30 April 2017	Killarney Celtic	1–0	Boyle Celtic	Killarney, Kerry
		Report		Stadium: Celtic Park

== First round ==
The first round was played between the eight first round winners, the four clubs which received byes in the preliminary round, and the twenty League of Ireland clubs. The first round draw was held on 21 July 2017.

11 August 2017	Waterford	0–3	Shelbourne	Waterford
			Lyons 46'; Doyle 78'; English 89'	Stadium: Waterford Regional Sports Centre

13 August 2017	Bluebell United	3–0	Sheriff Y.C.

12 August 2017	Cobh Ramblers	0–3	Limerick

12 August 2017	Longford Town	4–2 (a.e.t.)	Sligo Rovers

12 August 2017	Bray Wanderers	0–1	Cork City

13 August 2017	Dundalk	4–0	Derry City	Dundalk
	Mountney 1', 81'; McMillan 51' (pen.); Duffy 90'			Stadium: Oriel Park

13 August 2017	Portmarnock	0–2	St Patrick's Athletic

11 August 2017	Wexford	1–2	Crumlin United

11 August 2017	Finn Harps	4–3	Bohemians

11 August 2017	Cabinteely	3–1	UCD

11 August 2017	Shamrock Rovers	1–0	Glenville
		Report

12 August 2017	Cobh Wanderers	3–0	Killarney Celtic	Old Church Park
	Meade 31'; Stroat 32'; Stack 45+2' (pen.)	Report

12 August 2017	Bangor Celtic	3–2	Everton

12 August 2017	Ballincollig A.F.C.	0–5	Athlone Town

13 August 2017	Evergreen	0–4	Drogheda United	Kilkenny
		Report		Stadium: Kells Road

13 August 2017	Killester United	3–3 (a.e.t.) (6–7 p)	Galway United

== Second round ==
The second round draw was held on 14 August 2017.

25 August 2017	Shelbourne	0–3	Shamrock Rovers
		Report

25 August 2017	Bangor Celtic	0–1	Longford Town
		Report

25 August 2017	St Patrick's Athletic	0–2	Galway United
		Report

25 August 2017	Cork City	7–0	Athlone Town
		Report

25 August 2017	Bluebell United	1–0	Cabinteely
		Report

25 August 2017	Drogheda United	5–1	Cobh Wanderers
		Report

26 August 2017	Crumlin United	1–3	Dundalk
		Report

26 August 2017	Limerick	1–0	Finn Harps
		Report

== Quarter–finals ==
The quarter-finals draw was held on 28 August 2017.

8 September 2017	Bluebell United	2–4	Shamrock Rovers
		Report

8 September 2017	Galway United	1–2	Limerick
		Report

8 September 2017	Dundalk	4–0	Drogheda United
		Report

9 September 2017	Longford Town	1–4	Cork City
		Report

== Semi–finals ==
The semi-finals draw was held on 11 September 2017.

29 September 2017	Cork City	1–0	Limerick
19:15		Report

1 October 2017	Dundalk	1–1	Shamrock Rovers
16:45		Report

=== Replay ===
10 October 2017	Shamrock Rovers	2–4 (a.e.t.)	Dundalk
		Report

== Final ==
5 November 2017
15:30

Dundalk	1–1 (a.e.t.)	Cork City
N. Vemmelund 95'		A. Campion 111'
Penalties
	3–5

Aviva Stadium, Dublin
Attendance: 24,210
Referee: Paul McLaughlin

== See also ==
- 2017 League of Ireland Premier Division
- 2017 League of Ireland First Division
