= 2016 FAI Cup =

FAI Irish Daily Mail Cup

Tournament details
- Country: Republic of Ireland
- Teams: 40

Final positions
- Champions: Cork City (3rd title)
- Runners-up: Dundalk

The 2016 FAI Senior Challenge Cup, also known as the 2016 FAI Irish Daily Mail Senior Cup for sponsorship reasons, was the 96th season of the national Football competition of the Republic of Ireland. The winners of the competition earned a spot in the First qualifying round of the 2017–18 UEFA Europa League.

A total of 40 teams competed in the 2016 competition, which commenced in April 2016. The teams entered from the 2016 League of Ireland Premier Division and First Division received byes into the second round stage. Four non-league teams also received byes to the second round. The remaining 12 teams entered at the first round stage. These non league teams are composed of the sixteen clubs which reached the fourth round of the 2015–16 FAI Intermediate Cup, and the semi-finalists of the 2015–16 FAI Junior Cup.

Cork City won the cup with a late extra-time goal for a 1-0 win against Dundalk in the final on 6 November.

== Teams ==
Round	Clubs remaining	Clubs involved	Winners from previous round	New entries this round	Leagues entering at this round
First round	40	16	N/A	16	Leinster Senior League; Munster Senior League; Ulster Senior League
Second round	32	32	8	24	League of Ireland
Third round	16	16	16	none	none
Quarter-finals	8	8	8	none	none
Semi-finals	4	4	4	none	none
Final	2	2	2	none	none

== First round ==
The draw for the first round was made on 14 March 2016 at Abbotstown. 20 Non-League teams were included in the draw.

2 April	St.John Bosco	2–4	Janesboro F.C.	Brickfields Park
14:00		Report

3 April	Pike Rovers	1–0	Rockmount	Pike Rovers Complex
14:00		Report

3 April	Killester United	1–1	Cherry Orchard	Hadden Park
15:00	McKay 35'	Report	Rafferty

3 April	Carrigaline United	0–5	Bluebell United	Ballea Park
15:00		Report

10 April	Portmarnock A.F.C.	1–1	Letterkenny Rovers	Paddys Hill
14:30	Burgess 9'	Report	McElwaine 63'; Bonnar (red card) 65'

12 April	Crumlin United	1–0	Greystones United	Pearse Park
20:00		Report

16 April	St Peters F.C.	2–1	Leeside A.F.C.	Dubarry Park
17:00	McGee 15'; Scullion 75'	Report	Hyde 37'

21 April	Bandon A.F.C.	1–1	Ringmahon Rangers A.F.C.	Town Park
18.30	Holden 45'	Report	Higgins 49'

=== First round Replays ===
23 April	Ringmahon Rangers A.F.C.	2–2 (a.e.t.) (5–4 p)	Bandon A.F.C.	Ringmahon Park
15.00		Report

24 April	Cherry Orchard	1–0	Killester United	Elmdale Crescent
11:00		Report

24 April	Letterkenny Rovers	2–1	Portmarnock A.F.C.	Leckview Park
14.00	Connaghan 10'; Shiels 87'	Report	Moran 17'

== Second round ==
The draw for the second round was made on 26 April 2016 at the Aviva Stadium. The 20 League of Ireland clubs were entered into this round.

20 May	Bohemians	2–0	Galway United	Dalymount Park
19:45	Kavanagh 10'; Quigley 56'	Report

20 May	Cork City	4–0	St Peters F.C.	Turners Cross
19:45	O'Connor 10'; Holohan 20'; Dooley 32'; O'Sullivan 51'	Report

20 May	Derry City	1–1	Drogheda United	Brandywell Stadium
19:45	McEneff 73'	Report	O'Connor 33'

20 May	Dundalk	2–0	Shelbourne	Oriel Park
19:45	Horgan 21'; Kilduff 85'	Report

20 May	UCD	4–3	Bray Wanderers	UCD Bowl
19:45	O'Neill 3'; Sloggett 34'; Walters 45'; Douglas 68' (o.g.)	Report	Brennan 46', 52', 56'

20 May	Waterford United	0–2	Longford Town	RSC
19:45		Report	Duffy 24'; Gannon 38'

20 May	Shamrock Rovers	4–0	Midleton	Tallaght Stadium
20:00	Shaw 28'; Heaney 67'; Cregg 76'; Miele 90+2'	Report

20 May	Wexford Youths	3–0	Firhouse Clover F.C.	Ferrycarrig Park
20:20	Bonner 61'; Murphy 85', 90+2'	Report	Vickery (red card) 46'

21 May	Limerick	5–2	Bluebell United	Markets Field
14:00	Mulhall 14'; O'Flynn 41' (pen.), 51', 55' (pen.); O'Conor 90+2'	Report	Byrne 77'; Mustapha 84'

21 May	Ringmahon Rangers A.F.C.	2–1	Glebe North F.C.	Ringmahon Park
14:00	Deasy 50'; Kenny 60'	Report	Burke (red card) 59'; O'Connor 68'

21 May	Cobh Ramblers	2–1	Cherry Orchard	St. Colman's Park
14:30	O'Connor 2'; McGreevy 49'	Report	Penrose 41'

21 May	St Patrick's Athletic	8–0	Pike Rovers	Richmond Park
15:00	Dennehy 2', 14'; Timlin 4', 54'; Barker 34'; Kelly 48', 59'; Corcoran 60'	Report

21 May	Athlone Town	0–0	Letterkenny Rovers	Athlone Town Stadium
19:45		Report

21 May	Sligo Rovers	3–0	Cabinteely	The Showgrounds
19:45	Sadlier 16', 66'; Keohane 26'	Report

21 May	Finn Harps	0–1	Crumlin United	Finn Park
20:00	Molloy (yellow card) 61' (yellow-red card) 64'	Report	Moorehouse 49'

22 May	Janesboro F.C.	2–1	Sheriff Y.C.	Pearse Stadium
15:00	O'Reilly 57'; Nunan 70'	Report	Flood 22'; Dunne (red card) 60'; Lester (red card) 65'; O'Neill (red card) 85'

=== Second round Replays ===
24 May	Letterkenny Rovers	0–1 (a.e.t.)	Athlone Town	Leckview Park
18:00		Report	O'Sullivan 117'

24 May	Drogheda United	1–2	Derry City	United Park
19:45	Thornton 35'	Report	Patterson 4'; Daniels 55'

== Third round ==
The draw for the third round was made on 29 July 2016 in Clonmel.

19 August	Athlone Town	0–5	Shamrock Rovers	Athlone Town Stadium
19:45		Report	McCabe 48'; Boyd 52'; Miele 63'; Madden 73'; Doona 78'

19 August	Bohemians	0–2	Derry City	Dalymount Park
19:45		Report	Monaghan 39'; Boyle 48'

19 August	St Patrick's Athletic	2–0	Limerick	Richmond Park
19:45	Byrne 42'; Fagan 77'	Report

19 August	Wexford Youths	2–1	Sligo Rovers	Ferrycarrig Park
20:00	Dempsey 20'; Mulligan 90+2'	Report	Cretaro 64'

20 August	Ringmahon Rangers A.F.C.	1–4	Cobh Ramblers	Turners Cross
18:00	O'Brien 40'	Report	Ellis 8'; O'Connor 15', 25'; Lehane 69'

20 August	UCD	3–1	Janesboro F.C.	UCD Bowl
19:00	Swan 5'; Waters 29'; Scales 78'	Report	Ryan 38'

20 August	Longford Town	1–4	Cork City	Strokestown Road
19:30	Dsane 80'	Report	K.O'Connor 5'; Maguire 68'; Sheppard 71'; Ogbene 90+2'

30 August	Dundalk	5–0	Crumlin United	Oriel Park
19:45	Shields 8', 79'; Barrett 25'; Shiels 44'; O'Connor 74'	Report

== Quarter-finals ==
The draw for the Quarter-finals was made on 24 August 2016. RTÉ 2 HD televised the Shamrock Rovers v Cork City game.

9 September	Shamrock Rovers	0–5	Cork City	Tallaght Stadium
19:45		Report	Maguire 4', 46', 49'; Buckley 12'; Sheppard 33'

9 September	UCD	0–1	Dundalk	UCD Bowl
19:45		Report	Kilduff 66'

9 September	Wexford Youths	1–3	Derry City	Ferrycarrig Park
20:00	Molloy 6'	Report	Patterson 45'; Schubert 67'; McNamee 84'

10 September	St Patrick's Athletic	3–2	Cobh Ramblers	Richmond Park
16:00	Fagan 14'; McGrath 20'; Dennehy 37'	Report	Ellis 49'; Lehane 61'

== Semi-finals ==
The draw for the semi-finals was made on 13 September 2016 on Morning Ireland on RTÉ Radio 1. RTÉ 2 HD televised both games.

2 October	Dundalk	2–2	Derry City	Oriel Park
13:45	Shiels 21'; Kilduff 45+3'	Report	Patterson 65'; Curtis 86'

2 October	St Patrick's Athletic	1–3	Cork City	Richmond Park
15:55	Fagan 39'	Report	Bennett 24'; Maguire 51', 79'

=== Semi-final replays ===
4 October	Derry City	1–2	Dundalk	Brandywell Stadium
19:45	Curtis 4'	Report	Kilduff 38' (pen.); Finn 68'

== Final ==
6 November 2016	Cork City	1–0 (a.e.t.)	Dundalk	Dublin
15:40 GMT	Maguire 120'	Report		Stadium: Aviva Stadium; Attendance: 26,400; Referee: Rob Rogers
