= President of Ireland's Cup =

- Organiser(s): Football Association of Ireland
- Founded: 2014
- Region: (Republic of Ireland) Ireland
- Teams: 2
- Related competitions: FAI Super Cup
- Current champions: Derry City (2nd title) (2026)
- Most championships: Dundalk; Cork City (3 titles each)
- 2026 President of Ireland's Cup

The President of Ireland's Cup, also known simply as the President's Cup, is an association football super cup featuring clubs from the Republic of Ireland football league system. It is a one-off match between the winners of the previous season's League of Ireland Premier Division and the FAI Cup, and functions both as a domestic Super cup and an unofficial opener to the football season in Ireland. Because it is organised by the Football Association of Ireland, it is sometimes misleadingly referred to as the FAI President's Cup. However the president in the title refers to the President of Ireland and not the president of the FAI. The FAI has previously organised similar competitions, the Top Four Cup and the FAI Super Cup. A similarly named and formatted competition, the LFA President's Cup was organised by the Leinster Football Association.

== History ==
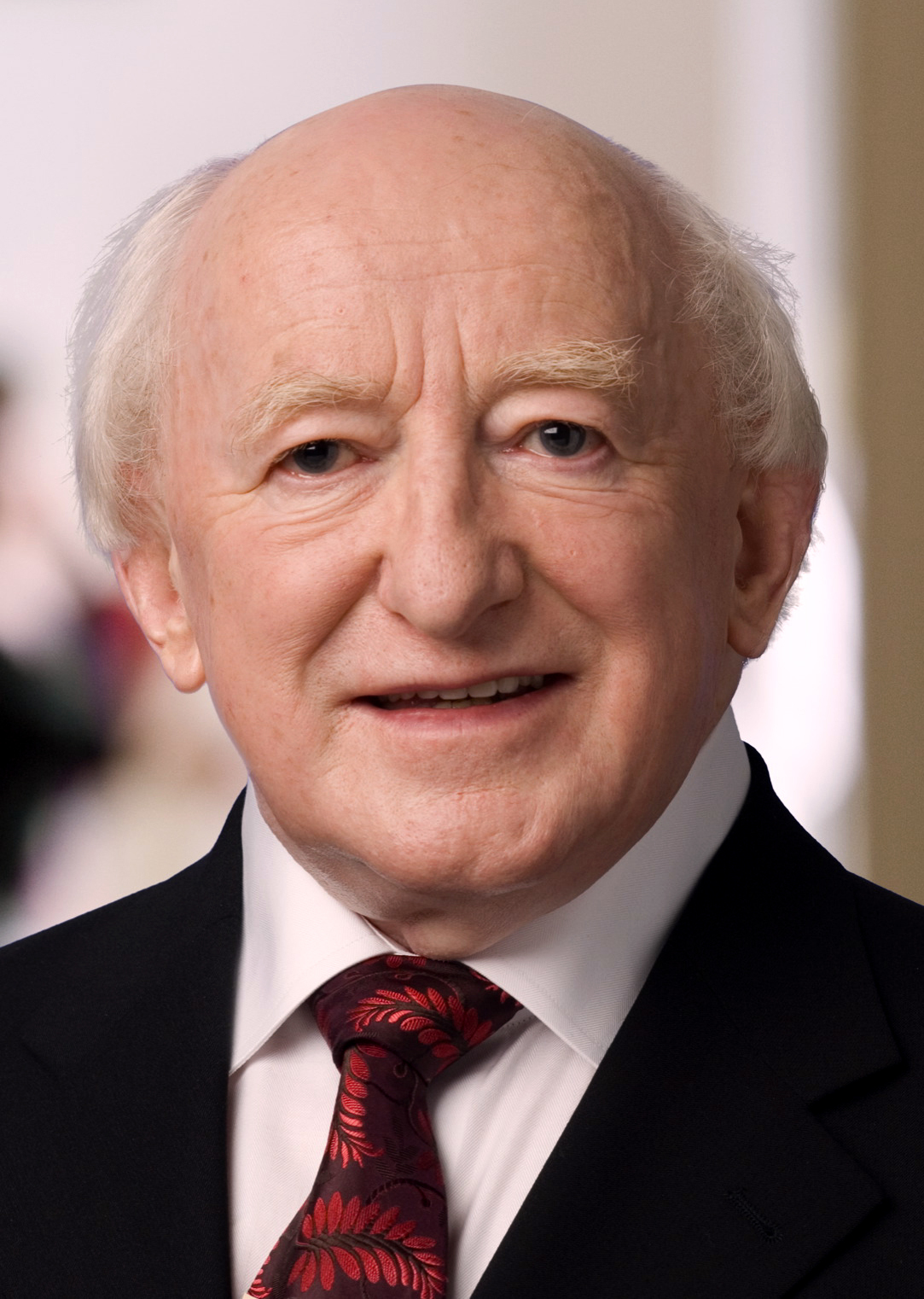
All President of Ireland's Cups have been presented by Michael D. Higgins, President of Ireland, 2011 to 2025.

The President of Ireland's Cup was introduced in 2014 and the inaugural match featured the 2013 League of Ireland Premier Division champions, St Patrick's Athletic, and the 2013 FAI Cup winners, Sligo Rovers. On 25 February 2014 the cup itself was officially unveiled with a ceremony at Áras an Uachtaráin hosted by the President of Ireland, Michael D. Higgins. President Higgins had previously served as president of Galway United and is a well-known football supporter who regularly attends League of Ireland games. Also at the ceremony were Liam Buckley and Ger O'Brien, the manager and captain of St Patrick's Athletic and Ian Baraclough and Gavin Peers, the manager and captain of Sligo Rovers. President Higgins subsequently attended the inaugural final at Richmond Park on 2 March 2014, which was won 1–0 by St Patrick's Athletic with Keith Fahey scoring the winner.

In the event that a team wins both the League of Ireland and the FAI Cup during the season, the league runners-up qualify to play in the competition.

== List of finals ==
Season	Winner	Score	Runners-up	Venue	Attendance	Ref.
2014	St Patrick's Athletic	1–0	Sligo Rovers	Richmond Park	1,330	
2015	Dundalk	2–1	St Patrick's Athletic	Oriel Park	1,800	
2016	Cork City	2–0	Dundalk	Turners Cross	1,850	
2017	Cork City	3–0	Dundalk	Turners Cross	3,140	
2018	Cork City	4–2	Dundalk	Oriel Park	3,000	
2019	Dundalk	2–1	Cork City	Turners Cross	2,777	
2020	—N/a	Cancelled (Note: Postponed due to Storm Ciara and then later cancelled due to COVID-19 restrictions)	Dundalk; Shamrock Rovers	Oriel Park	—N/a	
2021	Dundalk	1–1 (4–3 pens.)	Shamrock Rovers	Tallaght Stadium	0 (Note: Behind closed doors due to COVID-19 restrictions)	
2022	Shamrock Rovers	1–1 (5–4 pens.)	St Patrick's Athletic	Tallaght Stadium	5,426	
2023	Derry City	2–0	Shamrock Rovers	Brandywell Stadium	3,700	
2024	Shamrock Rovers	3–1	St Patrick's Athletic	Tallaght Stadium	8,053	
2025	Shelbourne	2–0	Drogheda United	Tolka Park	4,584	
2026	Derry City	1–0	Shamrock Rovers	Tallaght Stadium	4,711	

=== List of winners by club ===
Club	Titles	Seasons	Runners-up	Seasons
Dundalk	3	2015, 2019, 2021	3	2016, 2017, 2018
Cork City	3	2016, 2017, 2018	1	2019
Derry City	2	2023, 2026	0	—N/a
Shamrock Rovers	2	2022, 2024	3	2021, 2023, 2026
St Patrick's Athletic	1	2014	3	2015, 2022, 2024
Shelbourne	1	2025	0	—N/a
Sligo Rovers	0	—N/a	1	2014
Drogheda United	0	—N/a	1	2025

== See also ==
- Top Four Cup
- FAI Super Cup
- LFA President's Cup
