= 2023 Shamrock Rovers F.C. season =

Shamrock Rovers
2023 season
- Chairman: Ciaran Medlar
- Manager: Stephen Bradley
- Stadium: Tallaght Stadium
- Premier Division: 1st
- FAI Cup: First round
- President's Cup: Runners–up
- Leinster Senior Cup: Quarter–finals
- Champions League: First qualifying round
- Europa Conf. League: Second qualifying round
- Highest home attendance: 8,021 (v. Sligo Rovers F.C.)
- Lowest home attendance: 3,419 (v. Cork City)
- Average home league attendance: 6,085

The 2023 Shamrock Rovers F.C. season started on 4 February when Shamrock Rovers defeated University College Dublin in the Leinster Senior Cup. Shamrock Rovers were knocked–out of the UEFA Champions League on 18 July in the first qualifying round, knocked–out of the FAI Cup on 23 July in the first round, and knocked–out of the UEFA Europa Conference League on 3 August in the second qualifying round. Shamrock Rovers had won the previous three Premier Division championships coming into the 2023 season (2020, 2021, and 2022).

== Competitions ==
=== Premier Division ===
==== Premier Division review ====
===== February =====
Shamrock Rovers first league match happened on 18 February against Sligo Rovers The match took place at The Showgrounds in Sligo in front of 4,248 supporters. The match finished in a 1–1 draw. Graham Burke scored for Shamrock Rovers and Lukas Browning-Lagerfeldt for Sligo Rovers. Roberto Lopes was sent–off during the match. Shamrock Rovers next match was against Drogheda United at Weavers Park in Drogheda in front of 2,182 supporters. The match finished in a 1–1 draw. Graham Burke scored for Shamrock Rovers and Ryan Brennan scored for Drogheda United. Lee Grace and Daniel Cleary were sent–off during the match.

===== March =====
Shamrock Rovers faced Derry City on 3 March at Tallaght Stadium in Dublin in front of 7,626 supporters. Derry City won the match 2–1. Johnny Kenny scored for Shamrock Rovers and Ben Doherty and Jamie McGonigle scored for Derry City. Shamrock Rovers faced Cork City on 6 March at Tallaght Stadium in Dublin in front of 4,028 supporters. The match finished in a 4–4 draw. Rory Gaffney, Lee Grace, Simon Power, and Seán Hoare scored for Shamrock Rovers. Cork City got two goals from Darragh Crowley and got a goal each from Ruairí Keating and Kevin Čustović. Shamrock Rovers faced Shelbourne on 10 March at Tolka Park in Drumcondra, a suburb or Dublin in front of 4,378 supporters. The match finished in a 0–0 draw. Shamrock Rovers faced St Patrick's Athletic on 17 March at Tallaght Stadium in Dublin in front of 7,674 supporters. The match finished in a 2–2 draw. Richie Towell and Jack Byrne scored for Shamrock Rovers. Eoin Doyle and Jake Mulraney scored for St Patrick's Athletic. Shamrock Rovers faced Dundalk on 31 March at Oriel Park in Dundalk in front of 3,761. Shamrock Rovers won 4–0 with goals from Rory Gaffney, Lee Grace, Johnny Kenny, and Graham Burke. This was Shamrock Rovers first win of the season.

===== April =====
Shamrock Rovers took on Bohemians on 7 April at Dalymount Park in Dublin in front of 4,290 supporters. Shamrock Rovers won 2–0 with goals from Neil Farrugia and Rory Gaffney. Shamrock Rovers faced University College Dublin on 10 April at Tallaght Stadium in Dublin in front of 4,012 supporters. Shamrock Rovers won 3–0 with two goals from Graham Burke and a goal from Jack Byrne. Shamrock Rovers faced Shelbourne on 14 April at Tallaght Stadium in Dublin in front of 6,835 supporters. The match finished in a 2–2 draw. Graham Burke and Roberto Lopes scored for Shamrock Rovers. Shelbourne got goals from an own goal from Graham Burke and a goal from Matty Smith. Shamrock Rovers faced St. Patrick's Athletic on 21 April at Richmond Park in Dublin in front of 5,,011 supporters. Shamrock Rovers won 2–0 with goals from Johnny Kenny and Trevor Clarke. Shamrock Rovers faced Sligo Rovers on 28 April at Tallaght Stadium in Dublin in front of 5,512 supporters.

===== May =====
Shamrock Rovers started May with a match against Derry City. The match took place on 1 May at Brandywell Stadium in Derry, Northern Ireland in front of 3,700 supporters. Shamrock Rovers won 2–0 with goals from Richie Towell and Jack Byrne. Goalkeeper Alan Mannus, who went off injured, was replaced by Leon Pöhls. On 5 May, Shamrock Rovers were at home to Bohemians in front of 7,864 supporters. Shamrock Rovers won 2–0 with goals from Trevor Clarke and Rory Gaffney. On 12 May, Shamrock Rovers faced University College Dublin at the UCD Bowl in Dublin in front of 1,673 supporters. Shamrock Rovers won 3–0 with goals from Trevor Clarke and Aaron Greene and an own goal from Adam Wells. On 19 May, Shamrock Rovers faced St. Patrick's Athletic at home at Tallaght Stadium in Dublin in front of 6,212 supporters. Shamrock Rovers won the match 3–2. Shamrock Rovers got a goal from Lee Grace and two goals from Richie Towell, including one from a penalty kick. Shamrock Rovers lost their next two matches. They had been on a 13–match undefeated streak. The two losses came against Drogheda United in Dublin, who won 3–2, and Cork City, who won 1–0. Richie Towell, Johnny Kenny, and Seán Hoare were all sent–off during the match against Cork City.

===== June =====
On 2 June, Shamrock Rovers faced Dundalk at Tallaght Stadium in Dublin in front of 5,602 supporters. Shamrock Rovers won 2–0 with two goals from Aaron Greene. Ronan Finn was sent–off during the match. On 5 June, Shamrock Rovers face Sligo Rovers at The Showgrounds in Sligo in front of 2,587 supporters. Shamrock Rovers won 3–0 with two goals from Rory Gaffney and a goal from Aaron Greene. On 9 June, Shamrock Rovers faced University College Dublin at Tallaght Stadium in Dublin in front of 5,782 supporters. Shamrock Rovers won 4–0 with an own goal from Harvey O'Brien and goals from Jack Byrne, Graham Burke, and Kieran Cruise. On 26 June, Shamrock Rovers faced Bohemians at Dalymount Park in Dublin in front of 4,370 supporters. The match finished in a 2–2 draw. Neil Farrugia and Markus Poom scored for Shamrock Rovers and Jonathan Afolabi and James Clarke scored for Bohemians. Shamrock Rovers faced Derry City on 26 June at Tallaght Stadium in Dublin in front of 5,824 supporters. Shamrock Rovers won 1–0 with a goal from Rory Gaffney. Shamrock Rovers finished June with a 2–0 loss to Dundalk. Louie Annesley and Patrick Hoban scored for Dundalk.

===== July =====
Shamrock Rovers had only one league match in July. The match was against Drogheda United on 7 July at Weavers Park in Drogheda in front of 2,284 supporters. The match finished in a 0–0 draw. The rest of July included matches in the FAI Cup, UEFA Champions League, and UEFA Europa Conference League.

===== August =====
Shamrock Rovers league campaign continued in August when they faced Cork City at Tallaght Stadium on 6 August in front of 3,419 supporters. Shamrock Rovers won the match 2–1. Graham Burke and Liam Burt scored for Shamrock Rovers and Barry Coffey scored for Cork City. On 11 August, Shamrock Rovers faced Shelbourne at Tolka Park in Drumcondra in front of 4,250 supporters. The match finished in a 1–1 draw. Markus Poom scored for Shamrock Rovers and Gavin Molloy scored for Shelbourne.After the match, Aaron Greene was restrained by teammates after comments were directed at him by a supporter. Shamrock Rovers finished August with a 1–0 win against Dundalk. The match took place on 25 August at Tallaght Stadium in Dublin in front of 6,021 supporters.

===== September =====
Shamrock Rovers started September with a 3–0 win against Bohemians. The match took place on 1 September at Tallaght Stadium in Dublin in front of 7,816 supporters. Lee Grace, Ronan Finn, and Neil Farrugia scored for Shamrock Rovers. On 15 September, Shamrock Rovers faced Derry City at Brandywell Stadium in Derry in front of 3,435 supporters. Shamrock Rovers got their goal from Graham Burke from a penalty kick and Cameron McJannett scored for Derry City. On 22 September, Shamrock Rovers faced University College Dublin at UCD Bowl in Dublin in front of 1,615 supporters. The match finished in a 0–0 draw. The draw meant Shamrock Rovers extended their lead over Derry City at the top of the table and University College Dublin confirmed their relegation to the 2024 LOI First Division. Shamrock Rovers finished September with a 1–0 win against Shelbourne. The match took place on 29 September at Tallaght Stadium in Dublin in front of 7,879 supporters. Graham Burke scored the only goal of the match then was sent–off after receiving a second yellow card "moments after putting his side ahead". The three previous matches against Shelbourne in 2023 had been draws.

===== October and November =====
Shamrock Rovers started October with a match against Drogheda United on 22 October. The match took place at Tallaght Stadium in Dublin. Shamrock Rovers won the match 5–0 with goals from Trevor Clarke, Richie Towell, Neil Farrugia, and Markus Poom. Shamrock Rovers played St. Patrick's Athletic on 27 October, came away with a 2–0 win, which was enough to clinch them their 4th Premier Division title in a row. Goals from Aaron Greene and Graham Burke won it on the night. Shamrock Rovers finished October with a 0–0 draw against Cork City. On 3 November, Shamrock Rovers finished the 2023 season with a 4–2 win against Sligo Rovers in front of 8,021 supporters. Shamrock Rovers got two goals from Dylan Watts and a goal each from Graham Burke and Aaron Greene. Kailin Barlow and Fabrice Hartmann scored for Sligo Rovers.

==== Premier Division results ====
Date	Opponent	Venue	Results F–A	Shamrock Rover goalscorers	Attendance	Ref.
19 February	Sligo Rovers	The Showgrounds	1–1	Burke	4,248	
24 February	Drogheda United	Weavers Park	1–1	Burke	2,182	
3 March	Derry City	Tallaght Stadium	1–2	Kenny	7,626	
6 March	Cork City	Tallaght Stadium	4–4	Gaffney, Grace, Power, Hoare	4,028	
10 March	Shelbourne	Tolka Park	0–0	—	4,371	
17 March	St Patrick's Athletic	Tallaght Stadium	2–2	Towell, Byrne	7,674	
31 March	Dundalk	Oriel Park	4–0	Gaffney, Grace, Kenny, Burke	3,761	
7 April	Bohemians	Dalymount Park	2–0	Farrugia, Gaffney	4,290	
10 April	University College Dublin	Tallaght Stadium	3–0	Burke (2), Byrne	4,012	
14 April	Shelbourne	Tallaght Stadium	2–2	Burke, Lopes	6,835	
21 April	St. Patrick's Athletic	Richmond Park	2–0	Clarke, Kenny	5,011	
28 April	Sligo Rovers	Tallaght Stadium	2–1	Kenny, Clarke	5,512	
1 May	Derry City	Brandywell Stadium	2–0	Towell, Byrne	3,700	
5 May	Bohemians	Tallaght Stadium	2–0	Clarke, Byrne	7,864	
12 May	University College Dublin	UCD Bowl	3–0	Clarke, Greene, Wells (O.G.)	1,673	
15 May	St. Patrick's Athletic	Tallaght Stadium	3–2	Grace, Towell (2, Pen.)	6,212	
19 May	Drogheda United	Tallaght Stadium	1–2	Gaffney	5,157	
26 May	Cork City	Turners Cross	0–1	—	4,240	
2 June	Dundalk	Tallaght Stadium	2–0	Greene (2)	5,602	
5 June	Sligo Rovers	The Showgrounds	3–0	Gaffney (2), Greene	2,587	
9 June	University College Dublin	Tallaght Stadium	4–0	O'Brien (O.G.), Byrne, Burke, Cruise	5,782	
23 June	Bohemians	Dalymount Park	2–2	Farrugia, Poom	4,370	
26 June	Derry City	Tallaght Stadium	1–0	Gaffney	5,824	
30 June	Dundalk	Oriel Park	0–2	—	3,156	
7 July	Drogheda United	Weavers Park	0–0	—	2,284	
6 August	Cork City	Tallaght Stadium	2–1	Burke, Burt	3,419	
11 August	Shelbourne	Tolka Park	1–1	Poom	4,250	
25 August	Dundalk	Tallaght Stadium	1–0	Lopes	6,021	
1 September	Bohemians	Tallaght Stadium	3–0	Grace, Finn, Farrugia	7,816	
15 September	Derry City	Brandywell Stadium	1–1	Burke (Pen.)	3,435	
22 September	University College Dublin	UCD Bowl	0–0	—	1,615	
29 September	Shelbourne	Tallaght Stadium	1–0	Burke	7,879	
22 October	Drogheda United	Tallaght Stadium	5–0	Clarke, Towell, Kenny, Farrugia, Poom	4,672	
27 October	St. Patrick's Athletic	Richmond Park	2–0	Greene, Burke	5,022	
30 October	Cork City	Turners Cross	0–0	—		
3 November	Sligo Rovers	Tallaght Stadium	4–2	Burke, Watts (2), Greene	8,021	

==== Premier Division table ====
Pos	Team	Pld	W	D	L	GF	GA	GD	Pts	Qualification or relegation
1	Shamrock Rovers (C)	36	20	12	4	67	27	+40	72	Qualification for Champions League first qualifying round
2	Derry City	36	18	11	7	57	24	+33	65	Qualification for Conference League first qualifying round
3	St Patrick's Athletic	36	19	5	12	59	42	+17	62	Qualification for Conference League second qualifying round (Note: The 2023 FAI Cup winners qualified for the Conference League second qualifying round. Since the cup winners (St Patrick's Athletic) qualified based on league position, the second Conference League first qualifying round spot was passed to the fourth-placed team.)
4	Shelbourne	36	15	15	6	44	27	+17	60	Qualification for Conference League first qualifying round
5	Dundalk	36	17	7	12	59	44	+15	58	

Source: SSE Airtricity League,
Rules for classification: 1) Points; 2) Goal difference; 3) Goals scored.
(C) Champions

==== Results overview ====
Overall								Home						Away					
Pld	W	D	L	GF	GA	GD	Pts	W	D	L	GF	GA	GD	W	D	L	GF	GA	GD
36	20	12	4	67	27	+40	72	13	3	2	43	18	+25	7	9	2	24	9	+15

Last updated: 3 November 2023.
Source: Premier Division results

=== FAI Cup ===
==== FAI Cup review ====
Shamrock Rovers entered the first round of the 2023 FAI Cup. They faced Dundalk in the first round on 23 July 2023 at Oriel Park in Dundalk. Dundalk won the match 1–0 with a goal from Hayden Muller. Rory Gaffney left the match after five minutes due to injury.

==== FAI Cup results ====
Date	Round	Opponent	Venue	Result F–A	Shamrock Rovers goalscorers	Attendance	Ref.
23 July	1	Dundalk	Oriel Park	0–1	—	2,686	

=== President's Cup ===
==== President's Cup review ====
The 2023 President's Cup took place on 10 February 2023 at Brandywell Stadium in Derry, Northern Ireland. Derry City won 2–0 with goals from Will Patching and Michael Duffy.

==== President's cup result ====
Date	Opponent	Venue	Result F–A	Shamrock Rovers goalscorers	Ref.
10 February	Derry City	Brandywell Stadium	0–2	—	

=== Leinster Senior Cup ===
==== Leinster Senior Cup review ====
Shamrock Rovers participated in the 2022–23 Leinster Senior Cup. On 4 February, Shamrock Rovers defeated University College Dublin 4–1. On 13 March, Shamrock Rovers lost to Bray Wanderers 2–1. The match took place at the Carlisle Grounds in Bray in front of 1,172 supporters. Justin Ferizaj scored for Shamrock Rovers. Bray wanderers got goals from Conor Davis, who scored from a penalty kick, and Joseph Power.

==== Leinster Senior Cup results ====
Date	Round	Opponent	Venue	Result F–A	Goalscorers	Attendance	Ref.
4 February	4	University College Dublin	Tallaght Stadium	4–1			
13 March	QF	Bray Wanderers	Carlisle Grounds	1–2	Ferizaj	1,172	

=== Europe ===
==== Europe review ====
As the 2022 League of Ireland Premier Division champions, Shamrock Rovers qualified for the first qualifying round of the 2023–24 UEFA Champions League. They faced Breiðablik in the first qualifying round. Breiðablik won both legs of the tie, 1–0 in the first leg and 2–1 in the second leg. Shamrock Rovers entered the 2023–24 UEFA Europa Conference League after getting eliminated from the UEFA Champions League. They faced Ferencváros in the second qualifying round. Shamrock Rovers lost the first leg 4–0 and lost the second leg 2–0.

==== Europe results ====
===== UEFA Champions League results =====
Date	Round	Opponent	Venue	Result F–A	Shamrock Rovers goalscorers	Attendance	Ref.
11 July	1st QR – FL	Breiðablik	Tallaght Stadium	0–1	—	7,216	
18 July	1st QR – SL	Breiðablik	Kópavogsvöllur	1–2; 1–3 (Agg.)	Burke (Pen)	1,320	

===== UEFA Europa Conference League results =====
Date	Round	Opponent	Venue	Result F–A	Shamrock Rovers goalscorers	Attendance	Ref.
27 July	2nd QR – FL	Ferencváros	Groupama Aréna	0–4	—	10,735	
3 August	2nd QR – SL	Ferencváros	Tallaght Stadium	0–2; 0–6 (Agg.)	—	3,737	

=== Overall record ===
Competition	First match	Last match	Starting round	Final position	Record							
Competition	First match	Last match	Starting round	Final position	Pld	W	D	L	GF	GA	GD	Win %
LOI Premier Division	17 February 2023	3 November 2023	Matchday 1	Champions	36	20	12	4	67	27	+40	55.56
FAI Cup	23 July 2023	23 July 2023	First round	First round	1	0	0	1	0	1	−1	0.00
President's Cup	10 February 2023	10 February 2023	Final	Runner–up	1	0	0	1	0	2	−2	0.00
Leinster Senior Cup	4 February 2023	13 March 2023	Fourth round	Quarter–finals	2	1	0	1	5	3	+2	50.00
UEFA Champions League	11 July 2023	18 July 2023	First qualifying round	First qualifying round	2	0	0	2	1	3	−2	0.00
UEFA Europa Conference League	27 July 2023	3 August 2023	Second qualifying round	Second qualifying round	2	0	0	2	0	6	−6	0.00
Total					44	21	12	11	73	42	+31	47.73

Source: Competitions

== Roster and statistics ==
=== Roster and statistics ===
==== Roster, appearances, and goals ====
As of match played 22 September 2023

Roster, starts (substitute appearances), and goals
No.	Pos.	Players	LOI Premier Division		FAI Cup		President's Cup		Leinster Senior Cup		Champions League		Europa Conf. League		Total		Ref.
No.	Pos.	Players	Apps	Goals	Apps	Goals	Apps	Goals	Apps	Goals	Apps	Goals	Apps	Goals	Apps	Goals	Ref.
1	GK	Alan Mannus	19(0)	0	1(0)	0	0(0)	0	0(0)	0	0(0)	0	1(0)	0	21	0
2	DF	Sean Gannon	3(6)	0	0(0)	0	0(0)	0	1(0)	0	0(0)	0	1(0)	0	11	0
3	DF	Seán Hoare	14(5)	1	1(0)	0	0(0)	0	0(0)	0	2(0)	0	2(0)	0	24	1
4	DF	Roberto Lopes	25(2)	2	1(0)	0	1(0)	0	0(0)	0	2(0)	0	2(0)	0	33	2
5	DF	Lee Grace	20(2)	4	1(0)	0	1(0)	0	0(0)	0	0(1)	0	1(0)	0	26	4
6	DF	Daniel Cleary	27(0)	0	1(0)	0	1(0)	0	0(0)	0	2(0)	0	2(0)	0	33	0
7	MF	Dylan Watts	10(4)	0	1(0)	0	1(0)	0	0(0)	0	1(1)	0	0(1)	0	23	0
8	MF	Ronan Finn	10(4)	1	0(0)	0	0(0)	0	0(0)	0	2(0)	0	0(2)	0	18	1
9	FW	Aaron Greene	4(10)	4	1(0)	0	0(1)	0	0(0)	0	0(1)	0	0(2)	0	19	4
10	FW	Graham Burke	21(6)	9	1(0)	0	0(1)	0	0(0)	0	1(1)	1	1(0)	0	32	10
11	DF	Seán Kavanagh	16(5)	0	1(0)	0	0(0)	0	0(0)	0	2(0)	0	1(0)	0	24	0
14	MF	Simon Power	0(3)	1	0(0)	0	0(1)	0	1(0)	0	0(0)	0	0(0)	0	5	1
15	MF	Darragh Nugent	4(13)	0	0(0)	0	1(0)	0	1(0)	0	0(0)	0	0(0)	0	19	0
16	MF	Gary O'Neill	22(2)	0	1(0)	0	0(0)	0	0(0)	0	2(0)	0	2(0)	0	29	0
17	MF	Richie Towell	12(10)	4	0(1)	0	1(0)	0	0(0)	0	2(0)	0	2(0)	0	28	0
18	DF	Trevor Clarke	13(5)	4	0(0)	0	0(1)	0	0(0)	0	0(0)	0	0(0)	0	19	4
19	MF	Markus Poom	24(3)	2	0(0)	0	1(0)	0	0(0)	0	2(0)	0	2(0)	0	32	2
20	FW	Rory Gaffney	21(7)	8	1(0)	0	0(0)	0	0(0)	0	2(0)	0	0(0)	0	31	8
21	MF	Justin Ferizaj	0(4)	0	0(0)	0	0(0)	0	1(0)	1	0(0)	0	0(0)	0	5	1
22	DF	Freddie Turley	0(0)	0	0(0)	0	0(0)	0	0(0)	0	0(0)	0	0(0)	0	0	0
23	DF	Neil Farrugia	19(5)	3	0(0)	0	0(1)	0	0(0)	0	0(0)	0	0(0)	0	25	0
24	FW	Johnny Kenny	14(13)	4	0(1)	0	1(0)	0	0(0)	0	0(2)	0	2(0)	0	33	4
25	GK	Leon Pöhls	12(1)	0	0(0)	0	1(0)	0	1(0)	0	2(0)	0	1(0)	0	18	0
26	MF	Sean Carey	1(0)	0	0(0)	0	0(0)	0	1(0)	0	0(0)	0	0(0)	0	2	0
27	MF	Liam Burt	4(9)	1	0(1)	0	1(0)	0	1(0)	0	0(0)	0	1(1)	0	18	1
28	MF	Gideon Tetteh	0(0)	0	0(0)	0	0(0)	0	0(0)	0	0(0)	0	0(0)	0	0	0
29	MF	Jack Byrne	22(0)	4	0(0)	0	0(1)	0	0(0)	0	1(0)	0	0(0)	0	22	4
30	GK	Toms Leitis	0(0)	0	0(0)	0	0(0)	0	0(0)	0	0(0)	0	0(0)	0	0	0
31	MF	Kieran Cruise	0(2)	1	0(0)	0	1(0)	0	1(0)	0	0(0)	0	1(0)	0	5	1
34	FW	Conan Noonan	1(4)	0	0(0)	0	0(0)	0	1(0)	0	0(0)	0	1(0)	0	7	0
39	MF	Naj Razi	1(0)	0	0(1)	0	0(0)	0	0(0)	0	0(0)	0	0(2)	0	4	0
42	DF	Carl Lennox	0(0)	0	0(0)	0	0(0)	0	1(0)	0	0(0)	0	0(0)	0	1	0
	DF	Cory O'Sullivan	0(0)	0	0(0)	0	0(0)	0	0(0)	0	0(0)	0	0(0)	0	0	0

==== Own goals ====
Own goals by Shamrock Rovers players
No.	Player	Competition	Opponent	Final score	Ref.
1	Graham Burke	LOI Premier Division	Shelbourne	2–2	

Own goals by opposing players
No.	Player	Competition	Team	Final score	Ref.
1	Adam Wells	LOI Premier Division	University College Dublin	3–0	
2	Harvey O'Brien	LOI Premier Division	University College Dublin	4–0	

== Coaching staff ==
Current staff
Position	Coach
Manager:	Stephen Bradley
Assistant manager:	Glenn Cronin
Goalkeeping coach:	José Ferrer
