= Ciaron Harkin =

Northern Irish footballer (born 1996)

Personal information
- Full name: Ciaron Harkin
- Date of birth: 15 January 1996 (age 30)
- Place of birth: Derry, Northern Ireland
- Height: 1.80 m (5 ft 11 in)
- Position: Midfielder

Team information
- Current team: Finn Harps (on loan from Sligo Rovers)
- Number: 18

Youth career
- –2014: Trojans
- 2014–2015: Derry City

Senior career*
Years	Team	Apps	(Gls)
2015	Derry City	1	(0)
2015–2017	Institute		
2017–2019	Coleraine	71	(4)
2019–2025	Derry City	97	(6)
2024	→ Coleraine (loan)	18	(0)
2025–	Sligo Rovers	19	(0)
2026–	→ Finn Harps (loan)	12	(0)
- * Club domestic league appearances and goals as of 16:52, 3 November 2026 (UTC)

Ciaron "Jackie" Harkin (born 15 January 1996) is an Irish professional footballer who plays as a midfielder for League of Ireland First Division club Finn Harps on loan from Sligo Rovers. He previously played for Derry City (over two spells), Institute and Coleraine.

== Career ==
=== Youth career ===
Derry man Harkin grew up supporting Derry City and joined the club's under-19's as a 17-year-old from local club Trojans in 2014.

=== Derry City ===
On 31 May 2015, Harkin made his senior debut for Derry City in a 3–0 win away to Edenderry Town in the FAI Cup. He made his league debut on 5 June 2015 in a 3–0 defeat at home to St Patrick's Athletic.

=== Institute ===
In July 2015, Harkin joined NIFL Championship club Institute, where he played for a season and a half.

=== Coleraine ===
On 8 January 2017, Harkin signed for NIFL Premiership club Coleraine on a two-and-a-half-year contract. On 4 October 2017, he signed a new contract with the club running to the summer of 2020. On 5 May 2018, he was part of the side that won the 2017–18 Irish Cup by beating Cliftonville 3–1 at Windsor Park.

=== Return to Derry City ===
On 30 December 2018, it was announced that Harkin had returned to Derry City on a two-year contract, as part of a swap deal that saw Ben Doherty moving in the opposite direction. On 14 September 2019, he featured in the 2019 League of Ireland Cup final as his side were beaten in a penalty shootout by Dundalk, despite scoring his penalty in the shootout. On 29 March 2024, he made his first appearance in nearly two years in a 1–0 defeat at home to Galway United, having recovered from his two separate Anterior cruciate ligament injuries. On 29 July 2024, Harkin returned to former club Coleraine on loan until January 2025.

=== Sligo Rovers ===
On 29 July 2025, it was announced that Harkin had signed for fellow League of Ireland Premier Division club Sligo Rovers until the end of the season, with the option of an additional 12-month contract.

==== Finn Harps ====
On transfer deadline day 28 July 2026, Harkin joined League of Ireland First Division club Finn Harps on loan until the end of the season.

== International career ==
He was called up to the Northern Ireland U21 team in March 2018, remaining an unused substitute on 26 March 2018 in a 0–0 draw at home to Iceland U21.

== Personal life ==
Harkin is nicknamed "Jackie" since childhood, after martial artist Jackie Chan, as he was told he was a good fighter as a child.

== Career statistics ==
As of match played on 16 October 2026

Appearances and goals by club, season and competition
Club	Season	League			National Cup (Note: Includes FAI Cup & Irish Cup)		League Cup (Note: Includes League of Ireland Cup & Northern Ireland Football League Cup)		Europe		Other		Total	
Club	Season	Division	Apps	Goals	Apps	Goals	Apps	Goals	Apps	Goals	Apps	Goals	Apps	Goals
Derry City	2015	LOI Premier Division	1	0	1	0	0	0	–		–		2	0
Institute	2015–16	NIFL Championship			0	0	2	0	–		2 (Note: Appearances in the 2016 NIFL Premiership Playoffs)	0	4	0
Institute	2016–17	NIFL Championship			–		0	0	–		–		0	0
Institute	Total				0	0	2	0	–		2	0	4	0
Coleraine	2016–17	NIFL Premiership	12	0	4	0	–		–		–		16	0
Coleraine	2017–18	NIFL Premiership	36	4	4	0	1	0	2 (Note: Appearance(s) in the UEFA Europa League)	0	1 (Note: Appearance in the NIFL Charity Shield)	0	44	4
Coleraine	2018–19	NIFL Premiership	23	0	–		1	0	2	0	2 (Note: Appearances in the Scottish Challenge Cup)	0	28	0
Coleraine	Total		71	4	8	0	1	0	4	0	3	0	87	4
Derry City	2019	LOI Premier Division	34	5	1	0	4	0	–		–		39	5
Derry City	2020	LOI Premier Division	18	0	2	1	–		1	0	–		21	1
Derry City	2021	LOI Premier Division	33	1	2	0	–		–		–		35	1
Derry City	2022	LOI Premier Division	2	0	0	0	–		0 (Note: Appearance(s) in the UEFA Europa Conference League)	0	–		2	0
Derry City	2023	LOI Premier Division	0	0	0	0	–		0	0	0 (Note: Appearance in the President of Ireland's Cup)	0	0	0
Derry City	2024	LOI Premier Division	4	0	0	0	–		0 (Note: Appearance(s) in the UEFA Conference League)	0	–		4	0
Derry City	2025	LOI Premier Division	6	0	0	0	–		–		–		6	0
Derry City	Total		97	6	5	1	4	0	1	0	0	0	107	7
Coleraine (loan)	2024–25	NIFL Premiership	18	0	1	0	1	0	–		–		20	0
Sligo Rovers	2025	LOI Premier Division	9	0	2	0	–		–		–		11	0
Sligo Rovers	2026	LOI Premier Division	10	0	1	0	–		–		–		11	0
Sligo Rovers	Total		19	0	3	0	–		–		–		22	0
Finn Harps (loan)	2026	LOI First Division	12	0	–		–		–		–		12	0
Career total			218	10	18	1	9	0	5	0	5	0	255	11

== Honours ==
Coleraine

- Irish Cup (1): 2017–18

Derry City

- FAI Cup (1): 2022
- President of Ireland's Cup (1): 2023
