= Ben Doherty =

Northern Irish footballer (born 1997)

Personal information
- Full name: Ben Doherty
- Date of birth: 24 March 1997 (age 29)
- Place of birth: Derry, Northern Ireland
- Height: 1.75 m (5 ft 9 in)
- Position: Left back

Team information
- Current team: Coleraine

Youth career
- Institute
- 2015–2016: Derry City

Senior career*
Years	Team	Apps	(Gls)
2014–2015	Institute	12	(0)
2016–2018	Derry City	47	(1)
2018	→ Glenavon (loan)	19	(2)
2019–2021	Coleraine	70	(26)
2021–2023	Larne	59	(9)
2023–2026	Derry City	82	(6)
2026–	Coleraine	0	(0)

International career^{‡}
2017	Northern Ireland U21	4	(0)
- * Club domestic league appearances and goals as of 08:54, 17 June 2026 (UTC) ‡ National team caps and goals as of 16:30, 16 January 2025 (UTC)

Ben Doherty (born 24 March 1997) is an Irish professional footballer who plays as a left back for NIFL Premiership club Coleraine. He previously played for Institute, Derry City, Glenavon and Larne.

== Career ==
=== Institute ===
A native of Derry, Doherty played in the academy of Institute, before making his debut in a 3–2 loss at home to Cliftonville on 16 August 2014. He went on to make a total of 13 appearances for the side in all competitions before departing the club in January 2015.

=== Derry City ===
Doherty joined League of Ireland club Derry City's under 19 side in 2015, remaining there for 2 seasons before being called up to the first team by manager Kenny Shiels. He made his debut on 27 August 2016 in a 2–2 draw away to Bray Wanderers at the Carlisle Grounds. Doherty scored the first goal of his senior career on 30 August 2017 in a 3–0 win over Limerick at Maginn Park. He made the first European appearances of his career in July 2017 when Derry faced Danish side Midtjylland.

==== Glenavon loan ====
On 17 August 2018, Doherty was loaned out to NIFL Premiership club Glenavon until January 2019. He scored one goal in 20 appearances in all competitions during his loan spell.

=== Coleraine ===
On 28 December 2018, Doherty joined NIFL Premiership club Coleraine on a permanent basis, with midfielder Ciaron Harkin going in the opposite direction and joining Derry City as part of the deal. In later years, he described leaving Derry for Coleraine as the hardest decision of his career. He scored his first goal for the club on 18 January 2019, opening the scoring in a 2–1 win away to Ards. Doherty scored five goals in three appearances in the club's run to winning the 2019–20 Northern Ireland Football League Cup, but missed out on the final as his side defeated Crusaders 2–1 at Windsor Park. He finished the 2019–20 season with 14 goals in 31 appearances in all competitions, his best goalscoring return to date. On 17 September 2020, Doherty scored the first European goals of his career, scoring twice in a 2–2 draw with Motherwell in a 2–2 draw before his side were knocked out of the UEFA Europa League on penalties by the Scottish Premiership club. On 8 July 2021, Doherty made his final appearance for the club, scoring his side's goal in a 2–1 loss away to Velež Mostar in Bosnia and Herzegovina in the UEFA Europa Conference League.

=== Larne ===
Doherty signed for NIFL Premiership club Larne on 27 July 2021, on a 3-year contract, with Conor McKendy signing for Coleraine as part of the deal. On 11 January 2022, Doherty started the final of the 2021–22 County Antrim Shield as his side defeated Linfield 1–0 at Seaview.

=== Return to Derry City ===
On 6 January 2023, Doherty returned to League of Ireland Premier Division club Derry City on a 3-year contract. He made his returning debut on 10 February 2023, in the 2023 President of Ireland's Cup as his side defeated Shamrock Rovers at the Ryan McBride Brandywell Stadium. He made 43 appearances in all competitions during his first season with the club, scoring 5 goals as he helped them to secure UEFA Conference League football again for the following season. At the end of the 2023 season, he was named in the PFAI Premier Division Team of the Year by his fellow professionals. On 11 October 2024, Doherty suffered a hamstring injury in a 1–1 draw with Bohemians which required surgery that ended his season and resulted in missing the 2024 FAI Cup final which his side lost 2–0 to Drogheda United at the Aviva Stadium. On 16 June 2026, the club confirmed that Doherty would be departing, having scoring 6 goals in 98 appearances in all competitions in his second spell with them.

=== Return to Coleraine ===
On 16 June 2026, Doherty returned to his former club Coleraine on a two-year-contract.

== International career ==
Doherty received his first call up to the Northern Ireland U21 squad in August 2017 ahead of their game with Albania U21 in which he made his debut in a 1–0 win. He made a total of 4 appearances for the side.

== Career statistics ==
As of match played on 29 May 2026

Appearances and goals by club, season and competition
Club	Season	League			National Cup (Note: Includes Irish Cup & FAI Cup)		League Cup (Note: Includes Northern Ireland Football League Cup & League of Ireland Cup)		Europe		Other		Total	
Club	Season	Division	Apps	Goals	Apps	Goals	Apps	Goals	Apps	Goals	Apps	Goals	Apps	Goals
Institute	2014–15	NIFL Premiership	12	0	0	0	1	0	–		–		13	0
Derry City	2016	LOI Premier Division	9	0	4	0	0	0	–		–		13	0
Derry City	2017	LOI Premier Division	22	1	0	0	1	0	2 (Note: Appearance(s) in the UEFA Europa League)	0	–		25	1
Derry City	2018	LOI Premier Division	16	0	0	0	3	0	1	0	–		20	0
Derry City	Total		47	1	4	0	4	0	3	0	–		58	1
Glenavon (loan)	2018–19	NIFL Premiership	19	2	–		1	0	–		–		20	2
Coleraine	2018–19	NIFL Premiership	16	3	3	1	–		–		–		19	4
Coleraine	2019–20	NIFL Premiership	27	9	1	0	3	5	–		–		31	14
Coleraine	2020–21	NIFL Premiership	27	14	1	0	–		3	2	–		31	16
Coleraine	2021–22	NIFL Premiership	–		–		–		1 (Note: Appearance(s) in the UEFA Europa Conference League)	1	–		1	1
Coleraine	Total		70	26	5	1	3	5	4	3	–		92	35
Larne	2021–22	NIFL Premiership	38	5	3	0	0	0	–		5 (Note: 2 appearances in the NIFL Premiership UEFA Europa Conference League play-offs; 3 appearances in the County Antrim Shield)	0	46	5
Larne	2022–23	NIFL Premiership	21	4	–		0	0	2	0	0 (Note: Appearance(s) in the County Antrim Shield)	0	23	4
Larne	Total		59	9	3	0	0	0	2	0	5	0	69	9
Derry City	2023	LOI Premier Division	34	5	1	0	–		6	0	1 (Note: Appearance in the President of Ireland's Cup)	0	42	5
Derry City	2024	LOI Premier Division	26	1	4	0	–		2 (Note: Appearance(s) in the UEFA Conference League)	0	–		32	1
Derry City	2025	LOI Premier Division	11	0	1	0	–		–		–		12	0
Derry City	2026	LOI Premier Division	11	0	–		–		–		1	0	12	0
Derry City	Total		82	6	6	0	–		8	0	2	0	98	6
Derry City Total			129	7	10	0	4	0	11	0	2	0	156	7
Career total			289	44	18	1	9	5	17	3	7	0	313	53

== Honours ==
=== Club ===
Coleraine

- Northern Ireland Football League Cup (1): 2019–20

Larne

- County Antrim Shield (1): 2021–22

Derry City

- President of Ireland's Cup (1): 2023

=== Individual ===
- PFAI Premier Division Team of the Year (1): 2023
