= Leon Pöhls =

German footballer (born 1997)

Personal information
- Full name: Leon-Maurice Pöhls
- Date of birth: 1 May 1997 (age 29)
- Place of birth: Hamburg, Germany
- Height: 1.94 m (6 ft 4 in)
- Position: Goalkeeper

Youth career
- –2014: Eintracht Norderstedt
- 2015–2016: IMG Academy
- 2016–2019: i2i Academy

Senior career*
Years	Team	Apps	(Gls)
2016–2019	Tadcaster Albion		
2019–2025	Shamrock Rovers	57	(0)
2020	Shamrock Rovers II	10	(0)
2025–2026	Vllaznia Shkodër	35	(0)
- * Club domestic league appearances and goals as of 24 June 2026

Leon-Maurice Pöhls (born 1 May 1997) is a German professional footballer who most recently played as a goalkeeper for Kategoria Superiore club Vllaznia Shkodër.

== Early life ==
Pöhls studied international business management at York St John University.

== Career ==
=== Tadcaster Albion ===
Pöhls started his senior career with English side Tadcaster Albion in 2016, where he spent three seasons.

=== Shamrock Rovers ===
Pohls moved to League of Ireland Premier Division side Shamrock Rovers in 2019, helping the club win the league. Since joining the club, Pöhls became the second-choice goalkeeper behind Alan Mannus, but made 14 league appearances in the 2023 season while Mannus was out of action with a finger injury. In October 2023 Shamrock Rovers manager Stephen Bradley announced Pöhls would become the club’s first choice goalkeeper for the 2024 season, succeeding Mannus who retired. Shamrock Rovers finished second place in the Premier Division, narrowly missing out on the league title on the last day of the season. Pohls lost his place as starting goalkeeper in 2025 and changed his shirt number to 97. He came off the bench against Derry City to replace Edward McGinty who had been sent off. He started away to Galway United in a 0-0 draw the following week. Pohls left the hoops in the summer of 2025 due to limited game time.

=== Vllaznia ===
Pöhls moved to Kategoria Superiore club Vllaznia Shkodër in July 2025. He signed a one-year contract with the option of a further year.

== Personal life ==
Pöhls is a native of Hamburg, Germany.

== Career statistics ==
As of match played 1 July 2025

Appearances and goals by club, season and competition
Club	Season	League			National cup		Continental		Other		Total	
Club	Season	Division	Apps	Goals	Apps	Goals	Apps	Goals	Apps	Goals	Apps	Goals
Tadcaster Albion	2016–17	NPL Division One North					—					
Tadcaster Albion	2017–18	NPL Division One North					—					
Tadcaster Albion	2018–19	NPL Division One East					—					
Tadcaster Albion	Total						—					
Shamrock Rovers	2019	LOI Premier Division	0	0	0	0	0	0	0	0	0	0
Shamrock Rovers	2020	LOI Premier Division	0	0	0	0	0	0	1 (Note: Appearance in the League of Ireland Cup)	0	1	0
Shamrock Rovers	2021	LOI Premier Division	2	0	0	0	0	0	0	0	2	0
Shamrock Rovers	2022	LOI Premier Division	3	0	2	0	1 (Note: Appearance in the UEFA Europa Conference League)	0	0	0	6	0
Shamrock Rovers	2023	LOI Premier Division	15	0	0	0	3 (Note: Appearances in the UEFA Champions League and UEFA Europa Conference League)	0	1 (Note: Appearance in the President of Ireland's Cup)	0	19	0
Shamrock Rovers	2024	LOI Premier Division	35	0	1	0	16	0	1	0	53	0
Shamrock Rovers	2025	LOI Premier Division	2	0	0	0	0	0	0	0	2	0
Shamrock Rovers	Total		57	0	3	0	20	0	3	0	83	0
Shamrock Rovers II	2020	LOI First Division	10	0	—		—		—		10	0
Vllaznia Shkodër	2025–26	Kategoria Superiore	0	0	0	0	—		—		0	0
Career total			66	0	3	0	20	0	3	0	94	0
