= Graham Burke =

Irish footballer (born 1993)

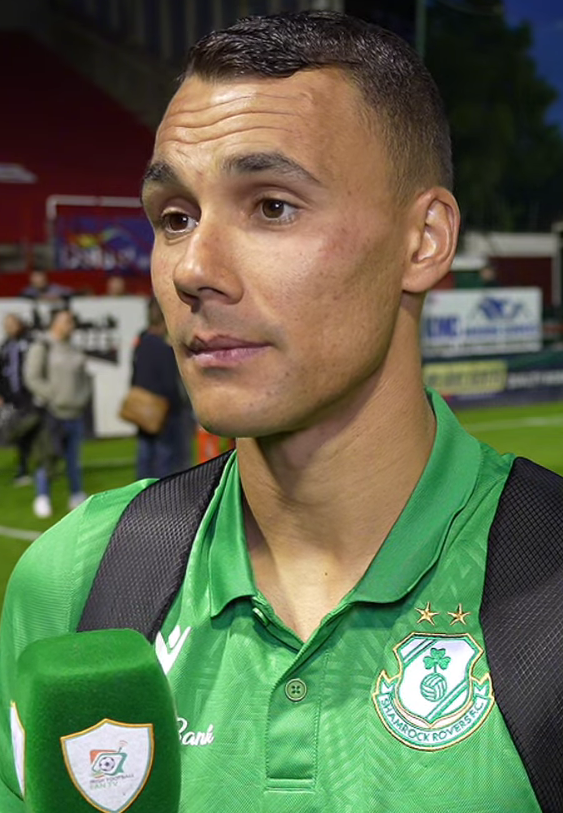
- Burke with Shamrock Rovers in 2025

Personal information
- Full name: Graham Dylan Burke
- Date of birth: 21 September 1993 (age 33)
- Place of birth: Dublin, Ireland
- Height: 1.80 m (5 ft 11 in)
- Position: Forward

Team information
- Current team: Shamrock Rovers
- Number: 10

Youth career
- Belvedere
- 2010–2011: Aston Villa

Senior career*
Years	Team	Apps	(Gls)
2011–2015	Aston Villa	0	(0)
2013	→ Shrewsbury Town (loan)	3	(0)
2015	→ Notts County (loan)	7	(1)
2015–2017	Notts County	36	(2)
2017–2018	Shamrock Rovers	41	(18)
2018–2021	Preston North End	12	(1)
2019	→ Gillingham (loan)	12	(1)
2019–2021	→ Shamrock Rovers (loan)	42	(18)
2021–	Shamrock Rovers	158	(48)

International career^{‡}
- Republic of Ireland U17
2011	Republic of Ireland U19	3	(0)
2013	Republic of Ireland U21	2	(0)
2018	Republic of Ireland	3	(1)
- * Club domestic league appearances and goals as of 17:17, 9 November 2026 (UTC) ‡ National team caps and goals as of 09:15, 27 September 2021 (UTC)

Graham Dylan Burke (born 21 September 1993) is an Irish professional footballer who plays as a forward for Shamrock Rovers. Burke has represented the Republic of Ireland at senior level.

== Club career ==
=== Aston Villa ===
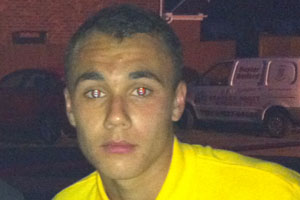
Burke in 2011

Burke was born in Dublin. He was first called up to a first-team matchday squad for Aston Villa's 2–0 home defeat against Bolton Wanderers in the third round of the League Cup on 20 September 2011, remaining an unused substitute. On 18 December he was included in the squad for the first time in the Premier League, again unused in a loss by the same score to Liverpool at Villa Park.

He made his senior debut as a 76th-minute substitute for Chris Herd in Villa's 3–0 home win over Tranmere Rovers in the second round of the League Cup on 28 August 2012. Burke was the joint top scorer in the 2012–13 NextGen Series under-19 club tournament, scoring both of Aston Villa's goals in the final which they won.

==== Loans to Shrewsbury Town and Notts County ====
Burke joined League One club Shrewsbury Town on a half-season loan on 8 August 2013, and made his Shrewsbury debut in a 3–0 defeat at Leyton Orient two days later. He scored his first senior goal in a 4–1 defeat to Oldham Athletic in the Football League Trophy, however Shrewsbury elected to end his loan spell early in October 2013.

Burke joined Notts County of the same league on an emergency loan on 26 March 2015 until the end of the season. Despite not scoring in his first six matches for the club Burke did make two assists in an important 2–1 win against Doncaster Rovers in the penultimate match of the season on 25 April, keeping County just above the relegation zone. Eight days later in the final game of the season, he scored his first league goal, opening the scoring away to Gillingham, but three late goals by the hosts relegated County to League Two.

=== Shamrock Rovers ===
On 15 February 2017, Burke signed for League of Ireland Premier Division club Shamrock Rovers, being described by manager Stephen Bradley as an "exciting talent". He made his debut for the club in a 2–1 defeat to Dundalk on 24 February 2017, scoring his side's only goal before being sent off two minutes later after receiving a straight red card following a foul on Dundalk player Jamie McGrath.

In March 2018, Burke scored four goals in one game against Derry City to become the first Rovers player in over 25 years to achieve such a feat and was later named SSE Airtricity/Soccer Writers' Association of Ireland Player of the month for March.

=== Preston North End ===
Burke signed for Championship club Preston North End on 13 June 2018 on a three-year contract for an undisclosed fee. Burke joined Aston Villa academy peers Callum Robinson and Daniel Johnson at the club.

==== Loan to Gillingham ====
On 31 January 2019, he joined Gillingham on loan.

=== Return to Shamrock Rovers ===
On 31 July 2019, Burke re-joined Shamrock Rovers on a one-year loan. In February 2020 Burke scored five goals against Cork City It was announced on 1 August 2020 that Burke's loan had been extended until the summer of 2021. On 15 March 2021, Shamrock Rovers announced that Burke had signed a pre-contract with the club, with a 3-year permanent contract at the club set to begin on 30 June 2021, when his loan move from Preston North End officially ended. On 13 July 2021, he scored a penalty against ŠK Slovan Bratislava in UEFA Champions League first qualifying round, but Rovers were eliminated 3–2 on aggregate. Burke scored his 100th goal for the club against Shelbourne in April 2026. On 27 August 2026, he scored a late own goal in a 1–0 defeat away to KuPS in Finland that saw his side crash out of the UEFA Conference League in the Playoff Round.

== European goals ==
Burke is Rovers' all-time top goalscorer in European competition, and joint top scorer for a League of Ireland player. In the 2025–26 UEFA Conference League he scored against AEK Athens, Breiðablik and Hamrun Spartans to take his total number of European goals to 14, tying the record held by David McMillan.

== International career ==
Burke has represented the Republic of Ireland from under-17 to under-21 level. In May 2018, Burke received his first call-up to the senior team for a trio of friendlies during May/June 2018. He made a substitute appearance for a Republic of Ireland XI against Celtic in Scott Brown's testimonial match on 20 May 2018. On 28 May 2018, Burke made his full senior international debut for the Republic of Ireland national team in a friendly game against France at the Stade De France when he came on in the 70th minute as a substitute.

Burke scored his first international goal for the Republic of Ireland on 2 June 2018 as Ireland beat the United States 2–1 in Dublin. In doing so, he became the first home-based Irish international goalscorer since April 1978 when Ray Treacy, also of Shamrock Rovers, scored for the Republic of Ireland against Turkey.

His third and final cap came in a friendly in Poland on 11 September 2018.

== Career statistics ==
=== Club ===
As of match played on 30 October 2026

Appearances and goals by club, season and competition
Club	Season	League			National cup (Note: Appearances in FA Cup and FAI Cup)		League cup (Note: Appearances in EFL Cup and League of Ireland Cup)		Europe		Other		Total	
Club	Season	Division	Apps	Goals	Apps	Goals	Apps	Goals	Apps	Goals	Apps	Goals	Apps	Goals
Aston Villa	2011–12	Premier League	0	0	0	0	0	0	—		—		0	0
Aston Villa	2012–13	Premier League	0	0	0	0	2	0	—		—		2	0
Aston Villa	2013–14	Premier League	0	0	0	0	—		—		—		0	0
Aston Villa	2014–15	Premier League	0	0	0	0	0	0	—		—		0	0
Aston Villa	Total		0	0	0	0	2	0	—		—		2	0
Shrewsbury Town (loan)	2013–14	EFL League One	3	0	—		—		—		1 (Note: Appearance(s) in EFL Trophy)	1	4	1
Notts County (loan)	2014–15	EFL League One	7	1	—		—		—		—		7	1
Notts County	2015–16	EFL League Two	31	2	0	0	1	1	—		2	0	34	3
Notts County	2016–17	EFL League Two	5	0	2	0	1	0	—		3	1	11	1
Notts County	Total		43	3	2	0	2	1	—		5	1	52	5
Shamrock Rovers	2017	LOI Premier Division	19	5	2	2	2	0	4 (Note: Appearances in UEFA Europa League)	3	0 (Note: Appearances in Leinster Senior Cup)	0	27	10
Shamrock Rovers	2018	LOI Premier Division	22	13	—		—		—		0	0	22	13
Shamrock Rovers	Total		41	18	2	2	2	0	4	3	0	0	49	23
Preston North End	2018–19	EFL Championship	12	1	1	0	2	1	—		—		15	2
Gillingham (loan)	2018–19	EFL League One	12	1	—		—		—		—		12	1
Shamrock Rovers (loan)	2019	LOI Premier Division	10	3	5	1	—		0	0	—		15	4
Shamrock Rovers (loan)	2020	LOI Premier Division	14	8	4	1	—		2	1	—		20	10
Shamrock Rovers (loan)	2021	LOI Premier Division	18	7	—		—		—		1 (Note: Appearances in President of Ireland's Cup)	0	19	7
Shamrock Rovers (loan)	Total		42	18	9	2	—		2	1	1	0	54	21
Shamrock Rovers	2021	LOI Premier Division	10	4	2	0	—		6 (Note: Two appearances, one goal in UEFA Champions League; four appearances, one goal in UEFA Europa Conference League)	2	—		18	6
Shamrock Rovers	2022	LOI Premier Division	26	11	1	0	—		7 (Note: Two appearances in UEFA Champions League; two appearances, one goal in UEFA Europa League; three appearances in UEFA Europa Conference League)	1	1	0	35	12
Shamrock Rovers	2023	LOI Premier Division	31	12	1	0	—		3 (Note: Two appearances, one goal in UEFA Champions League; one appearance in UEFA Europa Conference League)	1	1	0	36	13
Shamrock Rovers	2024	LOI Premier Division	27	4	0	0	—		8 (Note: One appearance in UEFA Champions League; four appearances, one goal in UEFA Europa League; three appearances, one goal in UEFA Conference League)	2	0	0	35	6
Shamrock Rovers	2025	LOI Premier Division	33	8	5	5	—		12 (Note: Two appearances in the 2024–25 UEFA Conference League campaign; ten appearances, four goals in the 2025–26 UEFA Conference League campaign)	4	0	0	50	17
Shamrock Rovers	2026	LOI Premier Division	31	9	0	0	—		8 (Note: Four appearances, one goal in the UEFA Champions League; two appearances, two goals in the UEFA Europa League; two appearances in the UEFA Europa League)	3	0	0	39	12
Shamrock Rovers	Total		158	48	9	5	—		44	13	2	0	213	66
Career total			311	89	22	9	8	2	50	17	9	2	400	119

=== International ===
As of match played 11 September 2018

Appearances and goals by national team and year
National team	Year	Apps	Goals
Republic of Ireland	2018	3	1
Total		3	1

As of match played 11 September 2018
Scores and results list the Republic of Ireland's goal tally first, score column indicates score after each Burke goal.

List of international goals scored by Graham Burke
No.	Date	Venue	Opponent	Score	Result	Competition	Ref.
1	2 June 2018	Aviva Stadium, Dublin, Ireland	United States	1–1	2–1	Friendly	

== Honours ==
=== Club ===
Aston Villa Under-19s

- NextGen Series: 2012–13

Shamrock Rovers

- League of Ireland Premier Division: 2020, 2021, 2022, 2023, 2025, 2026
- FAI Cup: 2019, 2025
- President of Ireland's Cup: 2022, 2024

=== Individual ===
- SRFC Player of the Year: 2025
- PFAI Premier Division Team of the Year (2): 2025, 2026
- NextGen Series top scorer: 2012–13
