= 2023 League of Ireland Premier Division =

39th season of the League of Ireland Premier Division

League of Ireland Premier Division
- Season: 2023
- Dates: 17 February – 3 November 2023
- Champions: Shamrock Rovers (21st title)
- Relegated: Cork City; UCD
- Champions League: Shamrock Rovers
- Conference League: Derry City; Shelbourne; St Patrick's Athletic
- Matches: 180
- Goals: 469 (2.61 per match)
- Top goalscorer: Jonathan Afolabi; Jack Moylan (15 goals each)
- Biggest home win: St Patrick's Athletic 7–0 UCD (30 June)
- Biggest away win: UCD 0–5 Derry City (6 September)
- Highest scoring: Shamrock Rovers 4-4 Cork City (6 March)
- Longest winning run: Shamrock Rovers (6 games)
- Longest unbeaten run: Shamrock Rovers (13 games)
- Longest winless run: UCD (10 games)
- Longest losing run: UCD (8 games)
- Highest attendance: 8,021; Shamrock Rovers 4–2 Sligo Rovers (3 November)
- Lowest attendance: 317; UCD 0–2 Cork City (22 October)
- Total attendance: 596,196
- Average attendance: 3,294

The 2023 League of Ireland Premier Division, known as the SSE Airtricity League Premier Division for sponsorship reasons, was the 39th season of the League of Ireland Premier Division, the top Irish league for association football clubs since its establishment in 1985.

The winners (Shamrock Rovers, their fourth consecutive title and twenty-first overall) qualified for the 2024–25 Champions League first qualifying round. The 2023 FAI Cup winners (St Patrick's Athletic) qualified for the 2024–25 Conference League second qualifying round. The runners-up (Derry City) and fourth-placed team (Shelbourne) qualified for the 2024–25 Conference League first qualifying round. The ninth-placed team (Cork City) qualified for the League of Ireland Premier Division play-off, losing and being relegated to the 2024 League of Ireland First Division. They were joined by the bottom-placed team (UCD).

== Teams ==
Ten teams competed in the league – the top nine teams from the previous season and the one team promoted from the First Division. The promoted team was Cork City, after a top flight absence of two years. They replaced Finn Harps who were relegated after four consecutive seasons in the top flight.

Shamrock Rovers were the defending champions, having won their twentieth title the previous season.

=== Stadiums and locations ===
Locations of Premier Division teams
Locations of Dublin Premier Division teams

| Team | Location | Stadium | Capacity |
|---|---|---|---|
| Bohemians | Dublin (Phibsborough) | Dalymount Park | 4,500 |
| Cork City | Cork | Turners Cross | 7,485 |
| Derry City | Derry | Ryan McBride Brandywell Stadium | 3,700 |
| Drogheda United | Drogheda | Weavers Park | 3,500 |
| Dundalk | Dundalk | Oriel Park | 4,500 |
| Shamrock Rovers | Dublin (Tallaght) | Tallaght Stadium | 10,500 |
| Shelbourne | Dublin (Drumcondra) | Tolka Park | 4,450 |
| Sligo Rovers | Sligo | The Showgrounds | 3,873 |
| St Patrick's Athletic | Dublin (Inchicore) | Richmond Park | 5,340 |
| UCD | Dublin (Belfield) | UCD Bowl | 3,000 |

=== Personnel and kits ===
Note: Flags indicate national team as has been defined under FIFA eligibility rules. Players may hold more than one non-FIFA nationality.

| Team | Manager | Captain | Kit manufacturer | Shirt sponsor |
|---|---|---|---|---|
| Bohemians | (Northern Ireland) Declan Devine | (Republic of Ireland) Keith Buckley | O'Neills | Des Kelly Interiors |
| Cork City | (Republic of Ireland) Richie Holland (interim) | (Republic of Ireland) Cian Coleman | Adidas | Zeus |
| Derry City | (Northern Ireland) Ruaidhrí Higgins | (Republic of Ireland) Patrick McEleney | O'Neills | Diamond Corrugated |
| Drogheda United | (Republic of Ireland) Kevin Doherty | (Republic of Ireland) Gary Deegan | Erreà | Drogheda Credit Union |
| Dundalk | (Republic of Ireland) Stephen O'Donnell | (Republic of Ireland) Patrick Hoban | Playr-Fit | Bet Regal |
| Shamrock Rovers | (Republic of Ireland) Stephen Bradley | (Republic of Ireland) Ronan Finn | Umbro | MASCOT Workwear |
| Shelbourne | (Republic of Ireland) Damien Duff | (Republic of Ireland) Luke Byrne | Umbro | Culligan |
| Sligo Rovers | (Republic of Ireland) John Russell | (Republic of Ireland) David Cawley | Joma | Avant Money |
| St Patrick's Athletic | (Republic of Ireland) Jon Daly | (Republic of Ireland) Joe Redmond | Umbro | Manguard Plus |
| UCD | (Republic of Ireland) Andrew Myler | (Republic of Ireland) Jack Keaney | O'Neills | Maples Group |

=== Managerial changes ===
| Team | Outgoing manager | Manner of departure | Date of vacancy | Position in table | Incoming manager | Date of appointment |
|---|---|---|---|---|---|---|
| St Patrick's Athletic | (Republic of Ireland) Tim Clancy | Mutual Consent | 2 May 2023 | 7th | (Republic of Ireland) Jon Daly | 2 May 2023 |
| Cork City | (Republic of Ireland) Colin Healy | Resigned | 3 May 2023 | 9th | (Republic of Ireland) Liam Buckley (interim) | 3 May 2023 |
| Cork City | (Republic of Ireland) Liam Buckley (interim) | Change of role | 28 September 2023 | 9th | (Republic of Ireland) Richie Holland (interim) | 28 September 2023 |

== League table ==
=== Standings ===
| Pos | Team | Pld | W | D | L | GF | GA | GD | Pts | Qualification or relegation |
|---|---|---|---|---|---|---|---|---|---|---|
| 1 | Shamrock Rovers (C) | 36 | 20 | 12 | 4 | 67 | 27 | +40 | 72 | Qualification for Champions League first qualifying round |
| 2 | Derry City | 36 | 18 | 11 | 7 | 57 | 24 | +33 | 65 | Qualification for Conference League first qualifying round |
| 3 | St Patrick's Athletic | 36 | 19 | 5 | 12 | 59 | 42 | +17 | 62 | Qualification for Conference League second qualifying round (Note: The 2023 FAI Cup winners qualified for the Conference League second qualifying round. Since the cup winners (St Patrick's Athletic) qualified based on league position, the second Conference League first qualifying round spot was passed to the fourth-placed team.) |
| 4 | Shelbourne | 36 | 15 | 15 | 6 | 44 | 27 | +17 | 60 | Qualification for Conference League first qualifying round |
| 5 | Dundalk | 36 | 17 | 7 | 12 | 59 | 44 | +15 | 58 | |
| 6 | Bohemians | 36 | 16 | 10 | 10 | 53 | 40 | +13 | 58 | |
| 7 | Drogheda United | 36 | 10 | 11 | 15 | 40 | 54 | −14 | 41 | |
| 8 | Sligo Rovers | 36 | 10 | 7 | 19 | 36 | 51 | −15 | 37 | |
| 9 | Cork City (R) | 36 | 8 | 7 | 21 | 35 | 64 | −29 | 31 | Qualification for play-off final |
| 10 | UCD (R) | 36 | 2 | 5 | 29 | 19 | 96 | −77 | 11 | Relegation to League of Ireland First Division |

Source: SSE Airtricity League,
Rules for classification: 1) Points; 2) Goal difference; 3) Goals scored.
(C) Champions; (R) Relegated

== Results ==
Teams play each other four times (twice at home and twice away).

| Home \ Away | BOH | COR | DER | DRO | DUN | SHM | SHE | SLI | STP | UCD |
|---|---|---|---|---|---|---|---|---|---|---|
| Bohemians | | 5–0 | 0–1 | 3–1 | 2–1 | 0–2 | 0–0 | 2–0 | 2–3 | 2–1 |
| Bohemians | | 4–0 | 2–2 | 4–2 | 3–2 | 2–2 | 1–1 | 3–1 | 0–2 | 2–0 |
| Cork City | 1–2 | | 1–3 | 1–1 | 1–0 | 1–0 | 0–2 | 1–0 | 2–3 | 4–0 |
| Cork City | 2–1 | | 0–1 | 1–1 | 1–2 | 0–0 | 0–2 | 3–0 | 0–1 | 1–1 |
| Derry City | 0–1 | 2–0 | | 0–1 | 0–0 | 0–2 | 0–0 | 1–1 | 2–0 | 4–1 |
| Derry City | 0–0 | 2–0 | | 3–0 | 3–0 | 1–1 | 0–0 | 2–1 | 3–0 | 6–0 |
| Drogheda United | 0–2 | 0–1 | 0–1 | | 0–1 | 1–1 | 1–1 | 1–0 | 1–3 | 3–1 |
| Drogheda United | 0–0 | 3–1 | 0–0 | | 1–2 | 0–0 | 2–4 | 2–2 | 2–1 | 3–0 |
| Dundalk | 2–2 | 2–1 | 2–2 | 3–2 | | 0–4 | 2–1 | 1–2 | 5–0 | 1–1 |
| Dundalk | 2–0 | 5–0 | 1–3 | 3–1 | | 2–0 | 1–1 | 1–0 | 1–1 | 4–1 |
| Shamrock Rovers | 2–0 | 4–4 | 1–2 | 1–2 | 2–0 | | 2–2 | 2–1 | 2–2 | 3–0 |
| Shamrock Rovers | 3–0 | 2–1 | 1–0 | 5–0 | 1–0 | | 1–0 | 4–2 | 3–2 | 4–0 |
| Shelbourne | 1–0 | 2–1 | 0–1 | 0–0 | 1–1 | 0–0 | | 2–1 | 0–1 | 1–0 |
| Shelbourne | 1–1 | 2–1 | 1–1 | 3–2 | 1–0 | 1–1 | | 1–1 | 2–1 | 3–2 |
| Sligo Rovers | 0–1 | 2–2 | 1–0 | 1–1 | 0–1 | 1–1 | 0–3 | | 2–1 | 3–1 |
| Sligo Rovers | 3–1 | 3–0 | 1–0 | 0–0 | 0–2 | 0–3 | 0–1 | | 0–2 | 2–0 |
| St Patrick's Athletic | 0–2 | 4–0 | 1–1 | 3–0 | 2–1 | 0–2 | 1–0 | 0–1 | | 3–0 |
| St Patrick's Athletic | 0–0 | 1–1 | 4–1 | 1–2 | 3–1 | 0–2 | 1–0 | 1–0 | | 7–0 |
| UCD | 1–1 | 1–0 | 0–4 | 0–1 | 0–2 | 0–3 | 0–0 | 2–3 | 1–3 | |
| UCD | 1–2 | 0–2 | 0–5 | 1–3 | 1–5 | 0–0 | 0–4 | 2–1 | 0–1 | |

Source: [http://www.extratime.ie/competition/100/ Extratime.ie
Legend: Blue = home team win; Yellow = draw; Red = away team win.
For upcoming matches, an "a" indicates there is an article about the rivalry between the two participants.

== Season statistics ==
=== Top scorers ===
| Rank | Player | Club | Goals |
|---|---|---|---|
| 1 | (Republic of Ireland) Jonathan Afolabi | Bohemians | 15 |
| 1 | (Republic of Ireland) Jack Moylan | Shelbourne | 15 |
| 3 | (Republic of Ireland) Patrick Hoban | Dundalk | 14 |
| 4 | (Republic of Ireland) Chris Forrester | St Patrick's Athletic | 13 |
| 4 | (Republic of Ireland) Ruairí Keating | Cork City | 13 |
| 6 | (Republic of Ireland) Graham Burke | Shamrock Rovers | 12 |
| 7 | (New Zealand) Max Mata* | Sligo Rovers | 11 |
| 8 | (Republic of Ireland) Daniel Kelly | Dundalk | 8 |
| 8 | (Republic of Ireland) Jordan McEneff | Derry City | 8 |
| 8 | (England) Freddie Draper* | Drogheda United | 8 |
| 8 | (Republic of Ireland) Rory Gaffney | Shamrock Rovers | 8 |

- Max Mata joined Shrewsbury Town on 4 August 2023.
- Freddie Draper returned to Lincoln City on 30 June 2023

=== Clean sheets ===
| Rank | Player | Club | Clean sheets |
|---|---|---|---|
| 1 | (Republic of Ireland) Brian Maher | Derry City | 14 |
| 2 | (Republic of Ireland) Conor Kearns | Shelbourne | 11 |
| 2 | (Republic of Ireland) James Talbot | Bohemians | 11 |
| 4 | (England) Dean Lyness | St Patrick's Athletic | 10 |
| 5 | (Germany) Leon Pöhls | Shamrock Rovers | 7 |
| 5 | (Wales) Nathan Shepperd | Dundalk | 7 |
| 7 | (Northern Ireland) Alan Mannus | Shamrock Rovers | 5 |
| 7 | (Republic of Ireland) Jimmy Corcoran | Cork City | 5 |
| 9 | (Republic of Ireland) Colin McCabe | Drogheda United | 4 |
| 10 | (Republic of Ireland) Luke McNicholas | Sligo Rovers | 3 |

== League of Ireland Premier Division play-off ==
The ninth-placed team (Cork City) qualified for a play-off alongside the second, third, fourth, and fifth-placed teams from the 2023 League of Ireland First Division (Athlone Town, Cobh Ramblers, Waterford, and Wexford).

The First Division teams contested the quarter and semi-finals. The quarter-finals were held over two legs, with the second-placed team (Waterford) facing the fifth-placed team (Athlone Town) and the third-placed team (Cobh Ramblers) facing the fourth-placed team (Wexford). The quarter-final winners then contested the semi-finals, with the winners ultimately facing the ninth-placed League of Ireland Premier Division team for the final place in the 2024 League of Ireland Premier Division.

=== Bracket ===
Quarter-finals
2 | Waterford | 1 | 3 | 4
5 | Athlone Town | 1 | 1 | 2
3 | Cobh Ramblers | 1 | 1 | 2
4 | Wexford | 0 | 1 | 1

Semi-finals
2 | Waterford | 2
3 | Cobh Ramblers | 1

Final
Waterford | 2
Cork City | 1

=== Quarter-finals ===
==== First leg ====
| 24 October 2023 | Athlone Town | 1–1 | Waterford | Athlone |
| 19:45 IST | Pierrot 78' | Report | Coughlan 52' | Stadium: Athlone Town Stadium; Attendance: 1,597; Referee: Oliver Moran |

| 24 October 2023 | Wexford | 0–1 | Cobh Ramblers | Wexford |
| 19:45 IST | | Report | O'Malley 15' (o.g.) | Stadium: Ferrycarrig Park; Attendance: 1,010; Referee: Alan Patchell |

==== Second leg ====
| 28 October 2023 | Waterford | 3–1 (4–2 agg.) | Athlone Town | Waterford |
| 19:45 IST | Akachukwu 64', 78', 90+4' | Report | Pierrot 71' (pen.) | Stadium: RSC; Attendance: 2,237; Referee: Gavin Colfer |

| 28 October 2023 | Cobh Ramblers | 1–1 (2–1 agg.) | Wexford | Cobh |
| 19:45 IST | O'Leary 75' | Report | Crawford 35' | Stadium: St. Colman's Park; Referee: Marc Lynch |

=== Semi-final ===
| 4 November 2023 | Waterford | 2–1 (a.e.t.) | Cobh Ramblers | Cork |
| 17:00 IST | Coughlan 47'; Phillips 100' | Report | McKevitt 88' | Stadium: Turners Cross; Referee: D Dunne |

=== Final ===
| 10 November 2023 | Waterford | 2–1 (a.e.t.) | Cork City | Dublin |
| 19:45 IST | Parsons 68'; Coughlan 101' (pen.) | Report | Coleman 55' | Stadium: Tallaght Stadium; Referee: D McGraith |

== Awards ==
=== Monthly awards ===
| Month | Player of the Month | | Ref. |
| Month | Player | Club | Ref. |
|---|---|---|---|
| February | (Republic of Ireland) Jordan McEneff | Derry City | |
| March | (Scotland) Ali Coote | Bohemians | |
| April | (Republic of Ireland) Ronan Coughlan | Waterford | |
| May | (England) Freddie Draper | Drogheda United | |
| June | (Republic of Ireland) Patrick Hoban | Dundalk | |
| July | (Republic of Ireland) Jonathan Afolabi | Bohemians | |
| August | (Republic of Ireland) James Clarke | Bohemians | |
| September | (Republic of Ireland) Ruairí Keating | Cork City | |
| October | (Republic of Ireland) Jack Moylan | Shelbourne | |
| November | (Republic of Ireland) Ronan Coughlan | Waterford | |

=== Annual awards ===
| Award | Winner | Club |
|---|---|---|
| PFAI Player of the Year | Chris Forrester | St Patrick's Athletic |
| PFAI Young Player of the Year | Sam Curtis | St Patrick's Athletic |
| PFAI Premier Division Manager of the Year | Stephen Bradley | Shamrock Rovers |

PFAI Team of the Year
| Goalkeeper | (Republic of Ireland) Conor Kearns (Shelbourne) | | | |
| Defenders | (England) Archie Davies (Dundalk) | (Republic of Ireland) Sam Curtis (St Patrick's Athletic) | (Cape Verde) Roberto Lopes (Shamrock Rovers) | (Northern Ireland) Ben Doherty (Derry City) |
| Midfielders | (England) Will Patching (Derry City) | | (Republic of Ireland) Chris Forrester (St Patrick's Athletic) | (Republic of Ireland) James Clarke (Bohemians) |
| Forwards | (Republic of Ireland) Jack Moylan (Shelbourne) | | (Republic of Ireland) Jonathan Afolabi (Bohemians) | (Republic of Ireland) Ruairí Keating (Cork City) |

== See also ==
- 2023 President of Ireland's Cup
- 2023 FAI Cup
- 2023 League of Ireland First Division
- 2022–23 Leinster Senior Cup
- 2023 Bohemian F.C. season
- 2023 Dundalk F.C. season
- 2023 Shamrock Rovers F.C. season
- 2023 Shelbourne F.C. season
- 2023 St Patrick's Athletic F.C. season

== Attendances ==
| # | Club | Average | % Change | Highest |
|---|---|---|---|---|
| 1 | Shamrock Rovers | 6,085 | 13,1% | 8,021 |
| 2 | Bohemian | 4,239 | 32,1% | 4,432 |
| 3 | St. Patrick's | 4,234 | 21,4% | 5,022 |
| 4 | Cork City | 3,665 | 4,2% | 6,487 |
| 5 | Shelbourne | 3,383 | 16,1% | 4,450 |
| 6 | Derry City | 3,293 | 3,4% | 3,700 |
| 7 | Dundalk | 2,636 | -2,0% | 3,761 |
| 8 | Sligo Rovers | 2,555 | 18,0% | 4,248 |
| 9 | Drogheda United | 1,915 | -1,4% | 2,284 |
| 10 | UCD | 862 | -9,5% | 1,673 |
