= Kevin Čustović =

Swedish footballer

Personal information
- Full name: Kevin Čustović
- Date of birth: 3 February 2000 (age 26)
- Place of birth: Sweden
- Height: 1.87 m (6 ft 2 in)
- Positions: Full-back; defensive midfielder

Team information
- Current team: Gorica

Youth career
- Västerås IK
- Gideonsbergs IF
- Skiljebo SK
- 2017–2019: Västerås SK

Senior career*
Years	Team	Apps	(Gls)
2016–2017	IFK Västerås	26	(9)
2017–2021	Västerås SK	42	(0)
2018	→ Skiljebo SK (loan)	4	(1)
2019	→ Enköpings SK (loan)	12	(1)
2019	→ Nyköpings BIS (loan)	7	(0)
2021–2024	Vejle	14	(0)
2022	→ Örebro SK (loan)	11	(1)
2023	→ Cork City (loan)	24	(2)
2024	Koper	4	(0)
2024–2025	Varbergs BoIS	14	(3)
2025–2026	Wisła Płock	39	(0)
2025	Wisła Płock II	1	(0)
2026–	Gorica	0	(0)
- * Club domestic league appearances and goals as of 18:01, 29 May 2026 (UTC)

Kevin Čustović (born 3 February 2000) is a Swedish professional footballer who plays as a full-back or defensive midfielder for Croatian Football League club Gorica.

== Career ==
=== Early years ===
Čustović started playing for Västerås IK. He then went to Gideonsbergs IF before joining Skiljebo SK. He later moved to IFK Västerås, where he despite his young age, made 26 appearances and scored nine goals for the club in the Swedish Division 4.

=== Västerås SK ===
On 3 July 2017 it was confirmed, that 17-year old Čustović had joined Västerås SK and would be a part of the clubs Division 1 team. Čustović made nine appearances in 2017 for Västerås, in addition to a few games for the U-21 team.

In the first half of the 2018 season, Čustović made six appearances for Västerås, including two cup games. To gain some more experience, Čustović was loaned out in September 2018 to his former club, Skiljebo SK. The deal included, that Čustović could play for both clubs until the end of the year.

In April 2019, Čustović was loaned out again, this time to Enköpings SK in the Swedish Division 2. In August 2019, he was loaned out to Division 1 club Nyköpings BIS. He returned to Västerås for the 2020 season.

In February 2021, Čustović suffered from heart problems during a training camp in Spain with Västerås. However, he had a good season with Västerås, playing 20 league games during the year, crowned with a contract extension of 1.5 years in June 2020.

=== Vejle ===
On 5 July 2021 it was confirmed, that 21-year old Čustović had signed a four-year contract with newly promoted Danish Superliga club Vejle Boldklub.

Čustović made his debut in the first Danish Superliga game of the season, on 18 July 2021, against Randers FC, where he was in the starting lineup. However, he was pulled off the pitch by manager Carit Falch after just 35 minutes. Vejle was down 0-2 and after the game, Falch explained that "there were some things he just didn't understand when the game was going so fast" and that "it was to protect the team". On 11 August 2022 it was confirmed, that Čustović had been loaned out to Superettan club Örebro SK for the rest of 2022.

On 30 January 2023, Čustović signed for League of Ireland Premier Division club Cork City on loan for the 2023 season.

After returning to Vejle, the club confirmed on 22 January 2024, that Čustović' contract had been terminated.

=== FC Koper ===
On 31 January 2024, Čustović joined Slovenian PrvaLiga side FC Koper on a deal until June 2025.

=== Varbergs BoIS ===
On 25 July 2024, Superettan club Varbergs BoIS confirmed that Čustović returned to Sweden after signing with the club.

=== Wisła Płock ===
On 8 January 2025, Čustović moved to Polish second-tier club Wisła Płock on a deal until June 2026 with a one-year extension option. He left the club at the end of his contract in June 2026.
