= Vinny Perth =

Irish footballer and manager (born 1976)

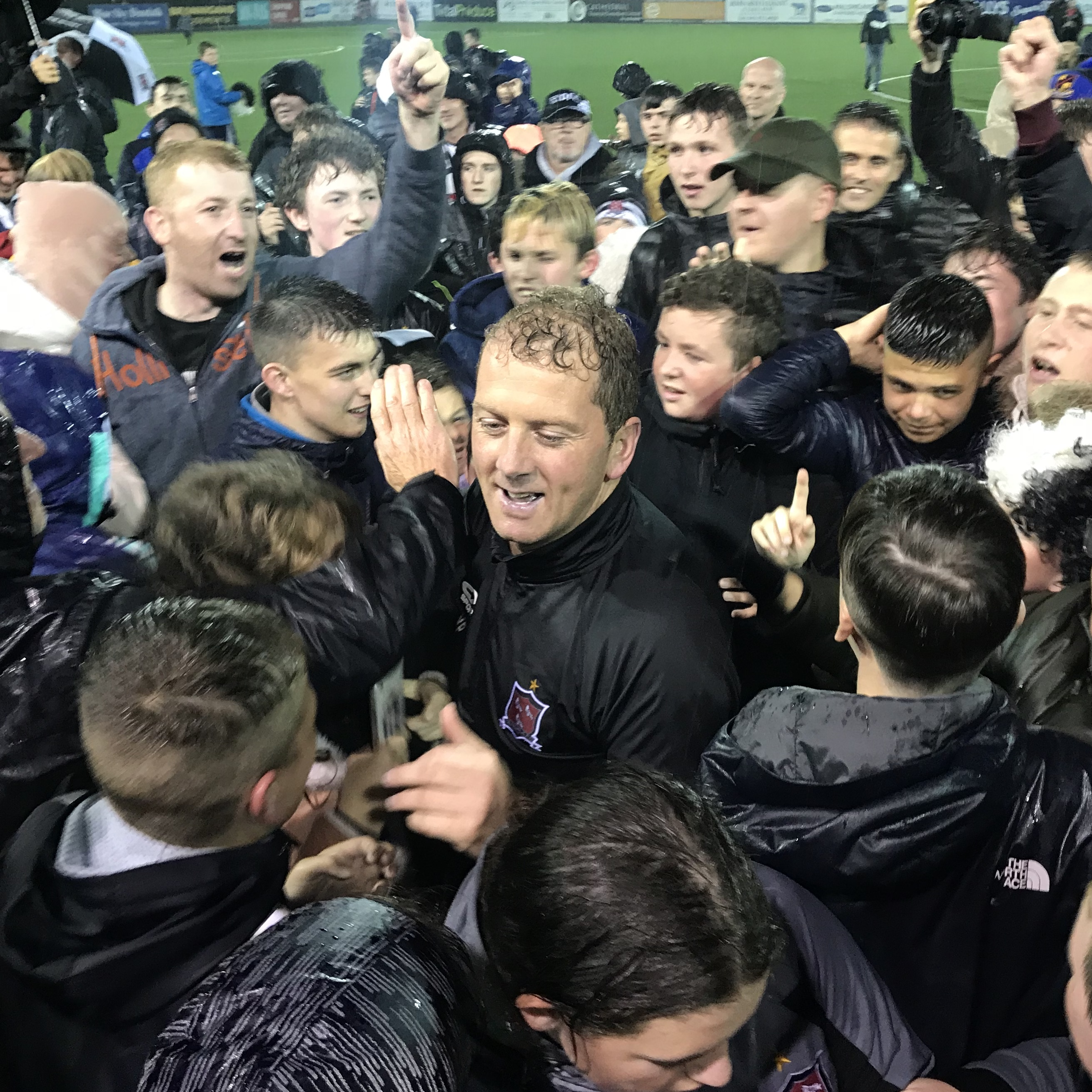

Personal information
- Full name: Vincent Perth
- Date of birth: 2 August 1976 (age 50)
- Place of birth: Dublin, Ireland
- Height: 1.82 m (6 ft 0 in)
- Position: Midfielder

Youth career
- Cherry Orchard

Senior career*
Years	Team	Apps	(Gls)
1998–2004	Longford Town		
2005	St Patrick's Athletic		
2006	Shamrock Rovers		
2007	Dundalk	17	

Managerial career
- 2008: Longford Town (assistant)
- 2008: Longford Town (caretaker)
- 2010–2012: Malahide United
- 2013–2018: Dundalk (assistant)
- 2019–2020: Dundalk
- 2021: Dundalk
- * Club domestic league appearances and goals

Vinny Perth (born 2 August 1976) is an Irish football manager and former player who most recently managed Dundalk.

A native of Tallaght, Perth began his career at Longford Town, working as assistant manager to Aaron Callaghan. Perth took over as caretaker when Callaghan resigned in August 2008. Perth was succeeded by Alan Gough in December 2008.

Perth was confirmed as the new manager of Dundalk in January 2019, taking over from the departed Stephen Kenny. He had served as Kenny's assistant at Dundalk since 2013.

Despite initially falling 13 points behind Shamrock Rovers in the league, Dundalk overhauled the deficit by May. In September 2019, Perth led Dundalk to the league title with four games to play, eventually finishing 11 points clear of their nearest rivals. The League Cup followed, with a win over Derry City on penalties securing Dundalk's second League and League Cup double and Perth's first as a manager. However, Perth was unable to secure the domestic treble for Dundalk as they were beaten finalists in the FAI Cup.

On 20 August 2020, Perth was sacked as manager of Dundalk after they were eliminated from the UEFA Champions League.

On 16 June 2021, Perth returned to the club as manager, appointed with the club sat in 8th place in the table. Dundalk finished the season in 6th place, sixth points off European qualification. On 1 December 2021, Perth left Dundalk for the second time after a local consortium bought the club.

== Managerial statistics ==
Team	Nation	From	To	Record							
Team	Nation	From	To	G	W	D	L	F	A	Gd	Win %
Dundalk	Ireland	4 January 2019	20 August 2020	65	43	10	12	121	49	+72	66.15
Dundalk	Ireland	16 June 2021	21 November 2021	32	15	7	10	50	40	+10	46.88
Total				97	58	17	22	161	89	+82	59.79

As of 22 November 2021

== Honours ==
=== Player ===
Longford Town

- FAI Cup (2): 2003, 2004
- League of Ireland Cup (1): 2004

Shamrock Rovers

- League of Ireland First Division (1): 2006

=== Manager ===
Dundalk

- League of Ireland Premier Division (1): 2019
- League of Ireland Cup (1): 2019
- FAI President's Cup (1): 2019
- Champions Cup (1): 2019

=== Individual ===
- PFAI Manager of the Year: 2019
