= Rory Gaffney =

Irish footballer

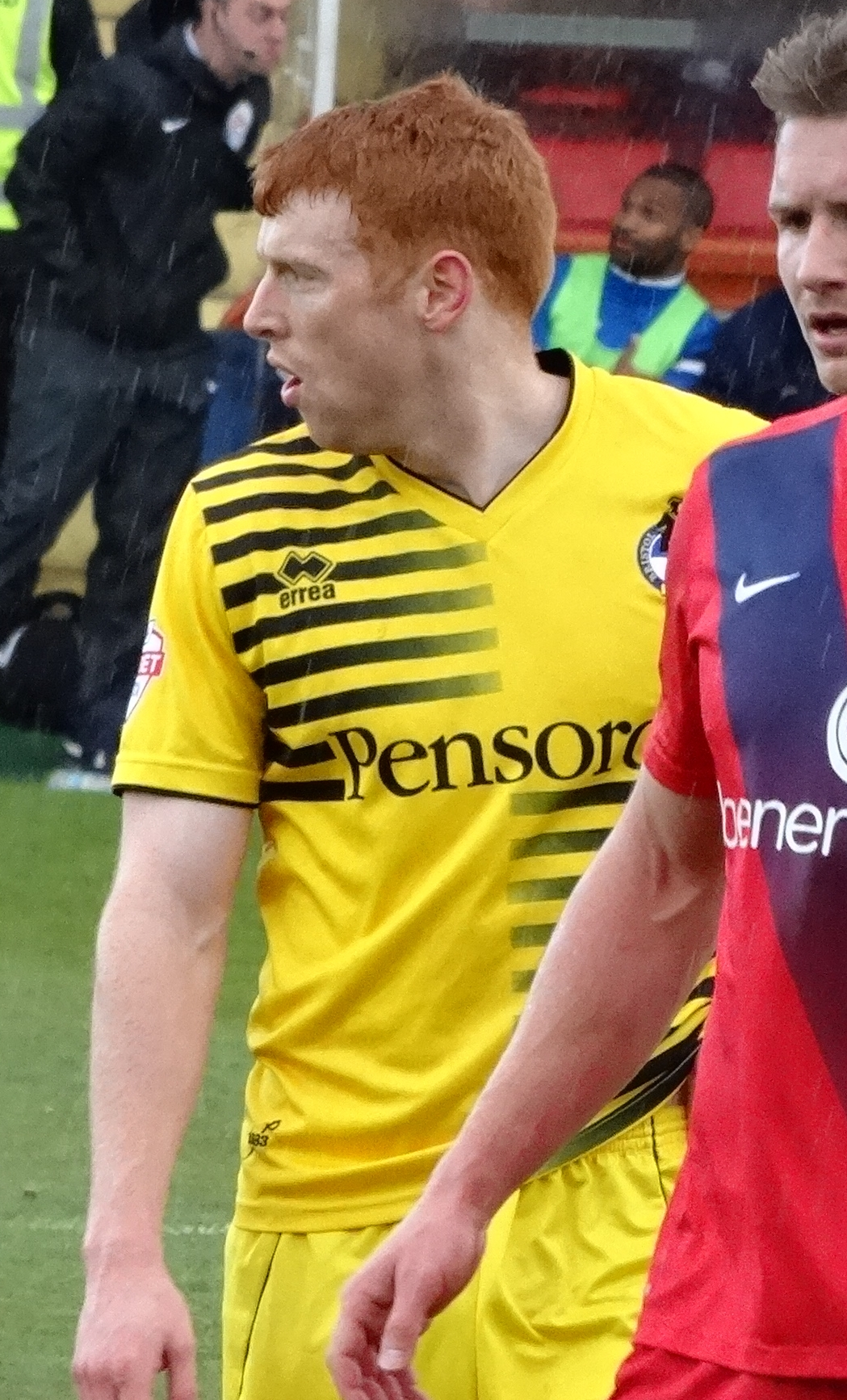
- Gaffney in 2016

Personal information
- Full name: Rory Nicholas Gaffney
- Date of birth: 23 October 1989 (age 37)
- Place of birth: Tuam, County Galway, Ireland
- Height: 6 ft 0 in (1.83 m)
- Position: Forward

Senior career*
| Years | Team | Apps | (Gls) |
| 2009–2011 | Mervue United | 59 | (13) |
| 2011–2014 | Limerick | 85 | (29) |
| 2015–2016 | Cambridge United | 6 | (2) |
| 2015–2016 | → Bristol Rovers (loan) | 7 | (5) |
| 2016–2018 | Bristol Rovers | 93 | (16) |
| 2018–2020 | Salford City | 45 | (11) |
| 2019–2020 | → Walsall (loan) | 15 | (1) |
| 2020–2026 | Shamrock Rovers | 142 | (36) |
- * Club domestic league appearances and goals

Rory Nicholas Gaffney (born 23 October 1989) is an Irish former professional footballer who played as a forward.

== Career ==
=== Limerick ===
Gaffney started his career at League of Ireland First Division team Mervue United before joining Premier League team Limerick in July 2011. He completed his studies at the Galway-Mayo Institute of Technology while playing in Ireland.

=== Cambridge United ===
On 25 November 2014 Gaffney agreed a move to League Two club Cambridge United when the transfer window opened. His first season was beset with injury and he made his Football League debut on 26 September 2015, replacing Conor Newton in the 81st minute in a 1–0 win against Stevenage at the Abbey Stadium providing the cross from which Cambridge scored. Gaffney went on to score twice on his first start for Cambridge United in the 3–2 away win over Yeovil Town on 23 October.

=== Bristol Rovers ===
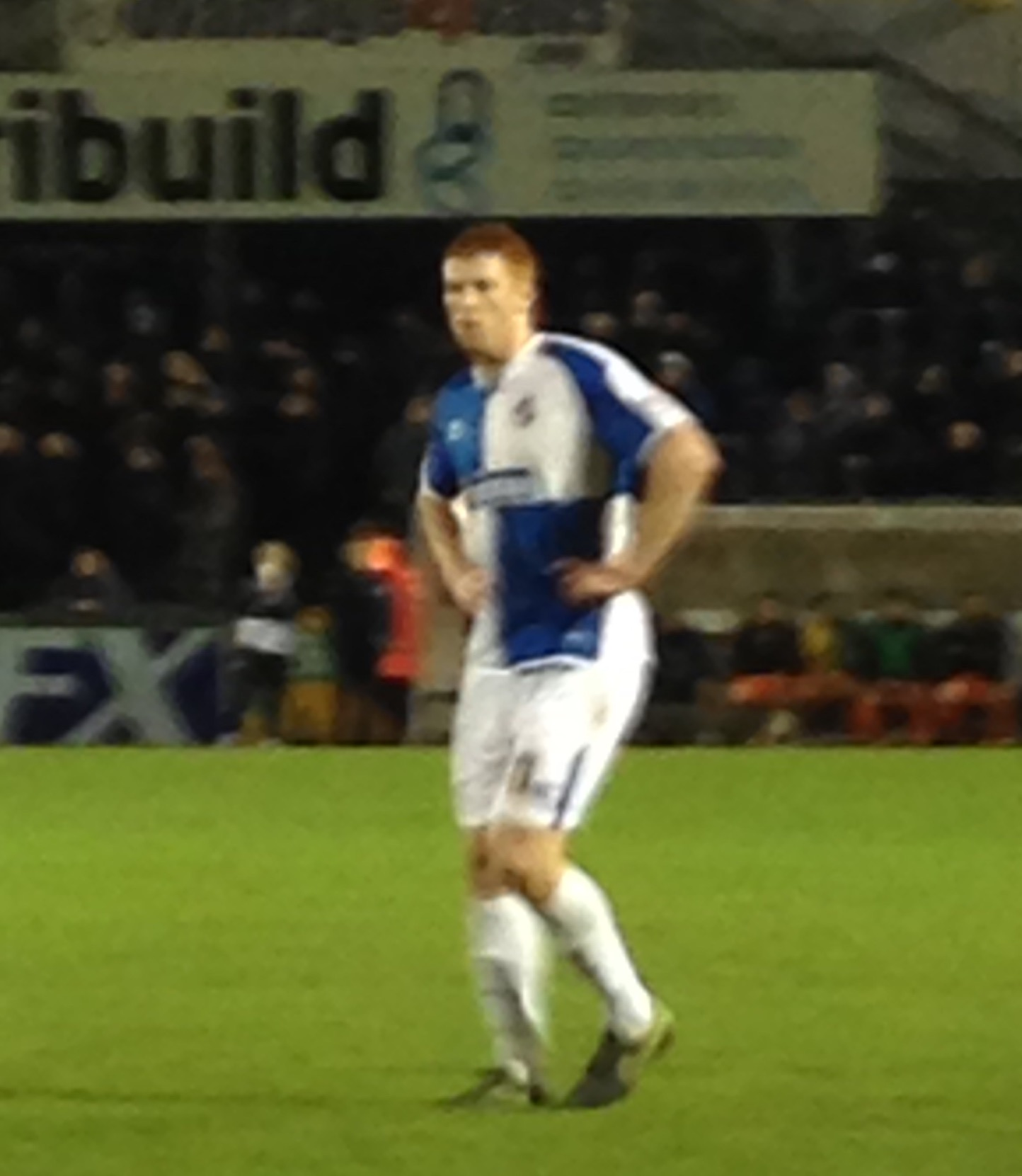
Gaffney in action for Bristol Rovers in December 2015.

On 14 January 2016, Gaffney moved permanently to League Two club Bristol Rovers after a successful loan spell. After scoring five goals in seven games for the West Country Club. Gaffney ended the season with a tally of eight league goals as he played a useful part in the club's promotion to Football League One.

Gaffney scored his first goal in Sky Bet League One and his first for the club since 16 April 2016 on 1 October 2016 with his club's first goal in a dramatic 3–2 win over Northampton Town. Rory scored his first goal since 10 December 2016 in the 4–2 victory over Bury on 11 March 2017 in a 2–0 victory over Southend United. He scored his second goal in a week scoring what would prove to be the winner in a 2–1 victory over Chesterfield taking his season total to four league goals. Gaffney ended the season with a total of nine goals including two in a 4–2 loss vs Peterborough United as his side narrowly missed the playoffs.

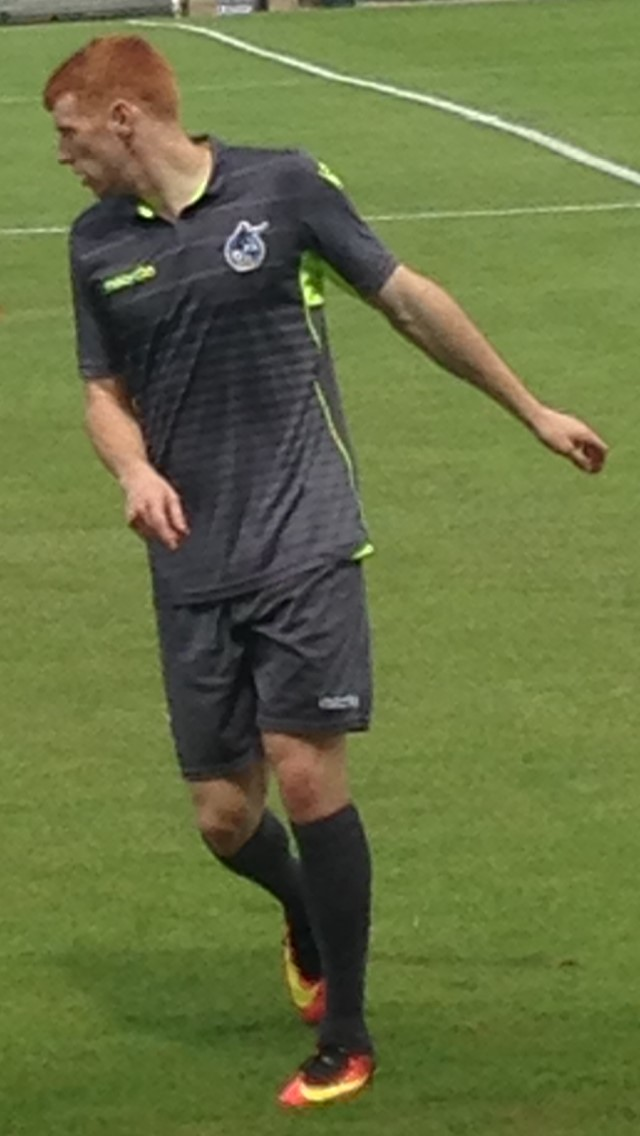
Gaffney during pre-season with Bristol Rovers.

Gaffney scored his first goal of the 2017–18 season to make it 3–1 in a 4–1 defeat to Peterborough United on 12 August 2017 when he headed home a Lee Brown cross at the back post.

=== Salford City ===
In June 2018 he joined National League side Salford City on a three-year contract. He made his debut in the opening match of the 2018–19 season on 4 August as Salford drew 1–1 at home to Leyton Orient. His first season with the club ended in success as Salford City won promotion to the Football League for the first time in their history in their first season in the fifth tier. Gaffney scored a penalty in a play-off semi-final shootout victory against Eastleigh and came off of the bench in the 3–0 final victory over AFC Fylde.

==== Walsall (loan) ====
On 31 August 2019 he joined Walsall on loan for the remainder of the 2019–20 season, linking up with former-Rovers manager Darrell Clarke. After 25 appearances, scoring just once, Gaffney had his loan terminated in February 2020.

=== Shamrock Rovers ===
On 24 February 2020, Salford City announced they and Gaffney had mutually parted ways and he had left the club and later that day signed for Shamrock Rovers. In April 2021, Gaffney opened his scoring for the club with a late equaliser against Sligo Rovers.

Gaffney scored twice at KF Teuta Durrës in a 2021–22 UEFA Europa Conference League tie where Rovers won 2-0 In the 2022–23 UEFA Champions League Gaffney scored against Hibernians F.C. When Gaffney scored at KF Shkupi in the 2022–23 UEFA Europa League he completed his scoring record in all three main European club competitions

At the end of the 2022 season, a season in which Shamrock Rovers won the league for a third consecutive season, Gaffney was named the PFAI Players' Player of the Year at the end of season awards. He was also awarded the SSE Airtricity League Player of the Year award

=== Return to Shamrock Rovers ===
Having originally being allowed leave the club at the end of the 2024 season following the end of his contract, Gaffney returned to Shamrock Rovers on 21 February 2025, 3 competitive games into the season, after proving his fitness following 10 months without a competitive appearance.

On 4 April 2025, Gaffney scored his first goal since his new contract in a 1–0 win away to Galway United. He then went on an impressive goal scoring run netting against Cork City, Waterford, Wexford St Joseph's and twice against Derry City and Ballkani in the space of 2 months. On 2 December 2025, he was named as League of Ireland Player of the Month for November, after scoring twice in his side's 2025 FAI Cup final win over Cork City.

After undergoing surgery ahead of the 2026 season, Gaffney's recovery period was continuously extended until on 3 September 2026, it was announced that he was retiring from professional football.

== Career statistics ==
As of match played on 27 November 2025

Appearances and goals by club, season and competition
| Club | Season | League | | | National cup | | League cup | | Europe | | Other | | Total | |
| Club | Season | Division | Apps | Goals | Apps | Goals | Apps | Goals | Apps | Goals | Apps | Goals | Apps | Goals |
|---|---|---|---|---|---|---|---|---|---|---|---|---|---|---|
| Mervue United | 2009 | LOI First Division | 14 | 3 | 0 | 0 | 1 | 0 | — | | — | | 15 | 3 |
| Mervue United | 2010 | LOI First Division | 31 | 6 | 0 | 0 | 0 | 0 | — | | — | | 31 | 6 |
| Mervue United | 2011 | LOI First Division | 14 | 4 | 0 | 0 | 0 | 0 | — | | — | | 14 | 4 |
| Mervue United | Total | | 59 | 13 | 0 | 0 | 1 | 0 | — | | — | | 60 | 13 |
| Limerick | 2011 | LOI First Division | 11 | 0 | 0 | 0 | 0 | 0 | — | | 0 | 0 | 11 | 0 |
| Limerick | 2012 | LOI First Division | 24 | 10 | 0 | 0 | 3 | 0 | — | | 0 | 0 | 27 | 10 |
| Limerick | 2013 | LOI Premier Division | 19 | 5 | 0 | 0 | 2 | 0 | — | | 0 | 0 | 21 | 5 |
| Limerick | 2014 | LOI Premier Division | 31 | 14 | 0 | 0 | 1 | 0 | — | | 0 | 0 | 32 | 14 |
| Limerick | Total | | 85 | 29 | 0 | 0 | 6 | 0 | — | | 0 | 0 | 91 | 29 |
| Cambridge United | 2014–15 | EFL League Two | 0 | 0 | 0 | 0 | 0 | 0 | — | | 0 | 0 | 0 | 0 |
| Cambridge United | 2015–16 | EFL League Two | 6 | 2 | 1 | 0 | 0 | 0 | — | | 0 | 0 | 7 | 2 |
| Cambridge United | Total | | 6 | 2 | 1 | 0 | 0 | 0 | — | | 0 | 0 | 7 | 2 |
| Bristol Rovers (loan) | 2015–16 | EFL League Two | 7 | 5 | 0 | 0 | 0 | 0 | — | | 0 | 0 | 7 | 5 |
| Bristol Rovers | 2015–16 | EFL League Two | 17 | 3 | 0 | 0 | 0 | 0 | — | | 0 | 0 | 17 | 3 |
| Bristol Rovers | 2016–17 | EFL League One | 34 | 6 | 2 | 3 | 2 | 0 | — | | 3 (Note: Appearances in the EFL Trophy) | 0 | 41 | 9 |
| Bristol Rovers | 2017–18 | EFL League One | 42 | 7 | 1 | 0 | 3 | 0 | — | | 1 | 0 | 48 | 7 |
| Bristol Rovers | Total | | 93 | 16 | 3 | 3 | 5 | 0 | — | | 4 | 0 | 113 | 24 |
| Salford City | 2018–19 | National League | 43 | 11 | 3 | 1 (Note: Includes appearance and goal in FA Cup qualifying match against Marine) | 0 | 0 | — | | 3 (Note: One appearance in the FA Trophy; two appearances in the National League playoffs) | 0 | 49 | 12 |
| Salford City | 2019–20 | EFL League Two | 2 | 0 | 0 | 0 | 1 | 0 | — | | 0 | 0 | 3 | 0 |
| Salford City | Total | | 45 | 11 | 3 | 1 | 1 | 0 | — | | 3 | 0 | 52 | 12 |
| Walsall (loan) | 2019–20 | EFL League Two | 15 | 1 | 3 | 0 | 0 | 0 | — | | 4 | 0 | 22 | 1 |
| Shamrock Rovers | 2020 | LOI Premier Division | 6 | 0 | 0 | 0 | — | | 0 | 0 | — | | 6 | 0 |
| Shamrock Rovers | 2021 | LOI Premier Division | 33 | 8 | 2 | 1 | — | | 6 (Note: Two appearances in the UEFA Champions League; four appearances, two goals in the UEFA Europa Conference League) | 2 | 1 (Note: Appearances in the President of Ireland's Cup) | 0 | 42 | 11 |
| Shamrock Rovers | 2022 | LOI Premier Division | 35 | 10 | 3 | 2 | — | | 12 (Note: Four appearances, one goal in the UEFA Champions League; three appearances, one goal in the UEFA Europa League; five appearances, one goal in the UEFA Europa Conference League) | 3 | 1 | 0 | 51 | 14 |
| Shamrock Rovers | 2023 | LOI Premier Division | 33 | 8 | 1 | 0 | — | | 2 (Note: Appearances in the UEFA Champions League) | 0 | 1 (Note: Appearances in the Leinster Senior Cup) | 1 | 37 | 9 |
| Shamrock Rovers | 2024 | LOI Premier Division | 8 | 1 | 0 | 0 | — | | 0 | 0 | 1 | 0 | 9 | 1 |
| Shamrock Rovers | Total | | 115 | 27 | 6 | 3 | — | | 20 | 5 | 4 | 1 | 145 | 36 |
| Shamrock Rovers | 2025 | LOI Premier Division | 27 | 9 | 4 | 3 | — | | 11 (Note: Appearances in the UEFA Conference League) | 3 | — | | 42 | 15 |
| Shamrock Rovers | 2026 | LOI Premier Division | 0 | 0 | 0 | 0 | — | | 0 | 0 | 0 | 0 | 0 | 0 |
| Shamrock Rovers | Total | | 27 | 9 | 4 | 3 | — | | 11 | 3 | 0 | 0 | 42 | 15 |
| Career total | | | 452 | 110 | 20 | 10 | 13 | 0 | 31 | 8 | 15 | 1 | 531 | 129 |

== Honours ==
Limerick

- League of Ireland First Division: 2012

Bristol Rovers

- Football League Two third-place promotion: 2015–16

Salford City

- National League play-offs: 2019

Shamrock Rovers

- League of Ireland Premier Division (5): 2020, 2021, 2022, 2023, 2025
- FAI Cup: 2025
- President of Ireland's Cup: 2022

Individual

- League of Ireland Player of the Month (2): October 2022, November 2025
- PFAI Premier Division Team of the Year (2): 2021, 2022
- PFAI First Division Team of the Year: 2012
- PFAI Players' Player of the Year: 2022
- SRFC Player of the Year: 2022
- FAI League Player of the Year: 2022
