= 2021–22 County Antrim Shield =

Tournament details
- Country: Northern Ireland
- Teams: 16

Final positions
- Champions: Larne (2nd win)
- Runners-up: Linfield

Tournament statistics
- Matches played: 15
- Goals scored: 59 (3.93 per match)

The 2021–22 County Antrim Shield was the 133rd edition of the County Antrim Shield, a cup competition in Northern Irish football.

Larne won the tournament for the 2nd time and 2nd consecutive season, defeating Linfield 1–0 in the final.

== Results ==
=== First round ===
Team 1	Score	Team 2
Ballyclare Comrades	3–1	Queen's University
Ballymena United	2–0	Harland & Wolff Welders
Bangor	2–0	PSNI
Cliftonville	9–0	Knockbreda
Dundela	2–0	Carrick Rangers
Larne	2–1	Glentoran
Newington	0–4	Crusaders
Linfield	1–0	Ards

=== Quarter-finals ===
Team 1	Score	Team 2
Ballyclare Comrades	2–2 (6–5 p)	Crusaders
Ballymena United	0–4	Larne
Cliftonville	4–2	Bangor
Linfield	6–1	Dundela

=== Semi-finals ===
Team 1	Score	Team 2
Cliftonville	1–1 (1–2 p)	Linfield
Larne	8–0	Ballyclare Comrades

=== Final ===
11 January 2022

Larne	1–0	Linfield
Cosgrove 77'	Report

Seaview, Belfast
