= Ruaidhrí Higgins =

Northern Irish footballer

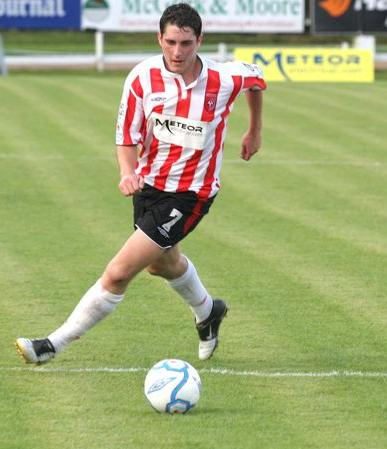
- Higgins in 2007

Personal information
- Date of birth: 23 October 1984 (age 42)
- Place of birth: Limavady, Northern Ireland
- Position: Midfielder

Youth career
- Newtown YFC
- 2000–2004: Coventry City

Senior career*
Years	Team	Apps	(Gls)
2004–2009	Derry City	188	(2)
2010	Bohemians	24	(3)
2011–2013	Derry City	70	(1)
2014–2015	Dundalk	23	(0)
2015–2016	Coleraine	43	(0)
Total		358	(6)

International career
2003–2004	Northern Ireland U21	2	(0)
2011	League of Ireland XI		

Managerial career
- 2017–2020: Dundalk (assistant coach/analyst)
- 2020–2021: Republic of Ireland (chief scout)
- 2021–2024: Derry City
- 2025–: Coleraine
- * Club domestic league appearances and goals

Ruaidhrí Higgins (born 23 October 1984) is a Northern Irish professional football manager and former player. He is the manager of NIFL Premiership club Coleraine.

== Playing career ==
Higgins, who was born in Limavady, Northern Ireland, began his career at the youth club, Newtown Y.F.C. before being signed by Coventry City in 1998. Higgins signed for Derry City after being released by Coventry City. He made his debut at home against Drogheda United on 14 October 2004. During his time at the Brandywell he won five trophies and played in five European ties.

After Derry City's League of Ireland contract was terminated - after the club admitted holding secondary, unofficial contracts with players - the FAI announced all of the club's players could quit the club. Now a free agent, Higgins had a trial with Aberdeen on 30 November 2009 but manager Mark McGhee reneged on his contract.

Higgins signed for Bohemians in January 2010. After breaking into Pat Fenlon's starting XI, he scored his first league goal for the club on 3 May with the winner against Drogheda United. However, some poor performances saw him regularly start matches on the substitute's bench and he failed to make an impact as Bohs relinquished their league title on goal difference. During the close season of 2010, Higgins was linked with a move back to his former club Derry City.

Higgins re-signed for Derry City in January 2011. He was released by Derry City at the end of the 2013 season.

On 14 January 2014, Higgins completed a move to Dundalk which saw him re-united with former manager Stephen Kenny.

Higgins then moved to NIFL Premiership side Coleraine and upon leaving the club in 2017, made the decision to retire and take up a coaching role at Dundalk.

== Coaching career ==
In May 2020, Higgins left Dundalk to link up once again with Stephen Kenny, this time with the Republic of Ireland national team as an opposition analyst.

On 23 April 2021, Higgins was appointed Derry City manager on a 3 1/2-year contract.

On 13 November 2022, Higgins won his first trophy in management when he led Derry City to a record win in the 2022 FAI Cup Final. He followed this up by winning the 2023 President of Ireland's Cup for the first time in the club's history. On 15 November 2024, it was announced that Higgins had left the club by mutual consent after finishing in a disappointing 4th place in the league and losing the 2024 FAI Cup final 2–0 to 9th placed Drogheda United.

On 2 May 2025, he was appointed as manager of NIFL Premiership club Coleraine. In his first season, he guided Coleraine to the 2025–26 Irish Cup, defeating Dungannon Swifts 3–2 in the final on 3 May 2026 to claim the club's seventh Irish Cup title.

== Managerial statistics ==
As of match played 21 November 2026

Team	Nation	From	To	Record							
Team	Nation	From	To	G	W	D	L	GF	GA	Gd	Win %
Derry City	Ireland	23 April 2021	15 November 2024	163	79	49	35	249	134	+115	48.47
Coleraine	Northern Ireland	2 May 2025	Present	71	48	8	15	160	73	+87	67.61
Total				234	127	57	50	408	208	+200	54.27

== Honours ==
=== Player ===
Derry City

- FAI Cup: 2006, 2012
- League of Ireland Cup: 2005, 2006, 2007, 2008, 2011

Bohemians

- Setanta Sports Cup: 2010

Dundalk

- League of Ireland: 2014
- League of Ireland Cup: 2014

=== Manager ===
Derry City

- FAI Cup: 2022, runner-up 2024
- President of Ireland's Cup: 2023

Coleraine

- Irish Cup: 2026
