= 2022 League of Ireland Premier Division =

38th season of the League of Ireland Premier Division

League of Ireland Premier Division
- Season: 2022
- Dates: 18 February – 4 November 2022
- Champions: Shamrock Rovers (20th title)
- Relegated: Finn Harps
- Champions League: Shamrock Rovers
- Europa Conference League: Derry City; Dundalk; St. Patrick's Athletic
- Matches: 180
- Goals: 472 (2.62 per match)
- Top goalscorer: Aidan Keena (18 goals)
- Biggest home win: Derry City 7–1 UCD (22 April 2022); Shelbourne 6-0 Drogheda United (28 October 2022)
- Biggest away win: St Patrick's Athletic 0–4 Derry City (29 April 2022); Drogheda United 0–4 St Patrick's Athletic (6 May 2022)
- Highest scoring: Derry City 7–1 UCD (22 April 2022); Shelbourne 4–4 St Patrick's Athletic (3 October 2022)
- Longest winning run: Derry City (6 games)
- Longest unbeaten run: Derry City (16 games)
- Longest winless run: UCD (14 games)
- Longest losing run: Finn Harps (4 games); UCD (4 games); Drogheda United (4 games)
- Highest attendance: 7,726; Shamrock Rovers 1–0 Derry City (30 October 2022)
- Lowest attendance: 473; UCD 0–2 Derry City (4 April 2022)
- Total attendance: 486,365
- Average attendance: 2,687
- All statistics correct as of 7 November 2022.

The 2022 League of Ireland Premier Division, known as the SSE Airtricity League Premier Division for sponsorship reasons, was the 38th season of the League of Ireland Premier Division, the top Irish league for association football clubs since its establishment in 1985. Shamrock Rovers were the defending champions, having won their nineteenth Premier Division title the previous season. They retained the title on 24 October as a result of Derry City drawing 0-0 away to Sligo Rovers.

== Teams ==
Ten teams compete in the league – the top eight teams from the previous season and the two teams promoted from the First Division. The promoted teams were Shelbourne and UCD, after respective top flight absences of one and three years. They replaced Longford Town (relegated after just one year back in the top flight), and Waterford (relegated via play-off after four years back in the top flight).

=== Stadiums and locations ===
Locations of Premier Division teams
Locations of Dublin Premier Division teams

Team	Location	Stadium	Capacity
Bohemians	Dublin (Phibsborough)	Dalymount Park	3,640
Derry City	Derry	Ryan McBride Brandywell Stadium	3,700
Drogheda United	Drogheda	Head In The Game Park	3,500
Dundalk	Dundalk	Oriel Park	4,500
Finn Harps	Ballybofey	Finn Park	6,000
St Patrick's Athletic	Dublin (Inchicore)	Richmond Park	5,340
Shamrock Rovers	Dublin (Tallaght)	Tallaght Stadium	8,000
Shelbourne	Dublin (Drumcondra)	Tolka Park	4,400
Sligo Rovers	Sligo	The Showgrounds	3,873
UCD	Dublin (Belfield)	UCD Bowl	3,000

=== Personnel and kits ===
Note: Flags indicate national team as has been defined under FIFA eligibility rules. Players may hold more than one non-FIFA nationality.

Team	Manager	Captain	Kit manufacturer	Shirt sponsor
Bohemians	(Northern Ireland) Declan Devine	(Republic of Ireland) Conor Levingston	O'Neills	Des Kelly Interiors
Derry City	(Northern Ireland) Ruaidhrí Higgins	(Northern Ireland) Eoin Toal	O'Neills	Diamond Corrugated
Drogheda United	(Republic of Ireland) Kevin Doherty	(Republic of Ireland) Dane Massey	Umbro	Drogheda Credit Union
Dundalk	(Republic of Ireland) Stephen O'Donnell	(Republic of Ireland) Brian Gartland	Umbro	Bet Regal
Finn Harps	(Republic of Ireland) Ollie Horgan	(Republic of Ireland) David Webster	Joma	Guild Esports
St Patrick's Athletic	(Republic of Ireland) Tim Clancy	(Republic of Ireland) Ian Bermingham	Umbro	Manguard Plus
Shamrock Rovers	(Republic of Ireland) Stephen Bradley	(Republic of Ireland) Ronan Finn	Umbro	888sport
Shelbourne	(Republic of Ireland) Damien Duff	(Republic of Ireland) Luke Byrne	Umbro	Hamptons Homes
Sligo Rovers	(Republic of Ireland) John Russell	(Republic of Ireland) David Cawley	Joma	Avant Money
UCD	(Republic of Ireland) Andrew Myler	(Republic of Ireland) Jack Keaney	O'Neills	Jigsaw

==== Managerial changes ====
Team	Outgoing manager	Manner of departure	Date of vacancy	Position in table	Incoming manager	Date of appointment
Shelbourne	(Republic of Ireland) Ian Morris	Sacked	30 October 2021	Pre-season	(Republic of Ireland) Damien Duff	3 November 2021
Dundalk	(Republic of Ireland) Vinny Perth	End of contract	30 November 2021	Pre-season	(Republic of Ireland) Stephen O'Donnell	11 December 2021
St Patrick's Athletic	(Republic of Ireland) Stephen O'Donnell	Moved to Dundalk	2 December 2021	Pre-season	(Republic of Ireland) Tim Clancy	2 December 2021
Drogheda United	(Republic of Ireland) Tim Clancy	Moved to St Patrick's Athletic	2 December 2021	Pre-season	(Republic of Ireland) Kevin Doherty	2 December 2021
Sligo Rovers	(Republic of Ireland) Liam Buckley	Mutual Consent	22 May 2022	6th	(Republic of Ireland) John Russell	22 May 2022
Bohemians	(Republic of Ireland) Keith Long	Sacked	30 August 2022	6th	(Republic of Ireland) Derek Pender (interim)	30 August 2022
Bohemians	(Republic of Ireland) Derek Pender	Permanent appointment	14 October 2022	6th	(Northern Ireland) Declan Devine	14 October 2022

== League table ==
=== Standings ===
Pos	Team	Pld	W	D	L	GF	GA	GD	Pts	Qualification or relegation
1	Shamrock Rovers (C)	36	24	7	5	61	22	+39	79	Qualification for Champions League first qualifying round
2	Derry City	36	18	12	6	53	27	+26	66	Qualification for Europa Conference League first qualifying round
3	Dundalk	36	18	12	6	53	30	+23	66	Qualification for Europa Conference League first qualifying round
4	St Patrick's Athletic	36	18	7	11	57	37	+20	61	Qualification for Europa Conference League first qualifying round
5	Sligo Rovers	36	13	10	13	47	44	+3	49	
6	Bohemians	36	12	10	14	45	46	−1	46	
7	Shelbourne	36	10	11	15	40	49	−9	41	
8	Drogheda United	36	9	11	16	34	58	−24	38	
9	UCD (O)	36	6	8	22	28	67	−39	26	Qualification for relegation play-offs
10	Finn Harps (R)	36	4	8	24	33	71	−38	20	Relegation to 2023 League of Ireland First Division

Source: SSE Airtricity League, Soccerway
Rules for classification: 1) Points; 2) Goal difference; 3) Goals scored.
(C) Champions; (O) Play-off winners; (R) Relegated

=== Positions by round ===
The table lists the positions of teams after each week of matches. In order to preserve chronological evolvements, any postponed matches are not included in the round at which they were originally scheduled but added to the full round they were played immediately afterward.

Team ╲ Round	1	2	3	4	5	6	7	8	9	10	11	12	13	14	15	16	17	18	19	20	21	22	23	24	25	26	27	28	29	30	31	32	33	34	35	36
Bohemians	5	7	4	5	6	6	6	7	6	6	6	6	6	6	6	5	7	7	6	6	6	6	6	6	6	6	6	6	6	6	6	6	6	6	6	6
Derry City	3	1	3	1	4	3	1	1	1	1	1	1	1	1	2	2	2	3	3	3	3	3	2	3	3	3	3	2	2	2	2	2	2	2	2	2
Drogheda United	5	10	10	8	8	8	8	8	8	7	7	7	7	8	8	8	8	8	8	8	8	8	8	8	8	8	8	8	8	8	8	8	8	8	8	8
Dundalk	3	6	2	2	5	5	5	5	5	3	5	5	3	4	3	3	3	2	2	2	2	2	3	2	2	2	2	3	3	3	3	3	3	3	3	3
Finn Harps	5	8	9	9	10	9	9	9	9	9	9	9	9	9	9	9	9	9	9	9	9	9	9	9	9	10	9	9	10	10	9	9	9	10	10	10
St Patrick's Athletic	1	2	7	4	2	1	3	3	3	4	3	3	5	3	4	4	4	4	4	4	4	4	4	4	4	4	4	4	4	4	4	4	4	4	4	4
Shamrock Rovers	1	2	1	2	1	4	4	2	2	2	2	2	2	2	1	1	1	1	1	1	1	1	1	1	1	1	1	1	1	1	1	1	1	1	1	1
Shelbourne	10	5	6	7	7	7	7	6	7	8	8	8	8	7	7	7	6	6	7	7	7	7	7	7	7	7	7	7	7	7	7	7	7	7	7	7
Sligo Rovers	5	4	5	6	3	2	2	4	4	5	4	4	4	5	5	6	5	5	5	5	5	5	5	5	5	5	5	5	5	5	5	5	5	5	5	5
UCD	10	9	8	10	9	10	10	10	10	10	10	10	10	10	10	10	10	10	10	10	10	10	10	10	10	9	10	10	9	9	10	10	10	9	9	9

Source: Extratime.com
= Leader and UEFA Champions League first qualifying round; = UEFA Conference League first qualifying round; = Qualification to the Relegation play-offs; = Relegation to the League of Ireland First Division

== Results ==
Teams will play each other four times (twice at home, twice away).

Home \ Away	BOH	DER	DRO	DUN	FHA	STP	SHM	SHE	SLI	UCD
Bohemians		1–2	1–1	2–2	2–2	1–0	1–3	1–1	2–1	3–0
Bohemians		2–3	0–1	0–1	2–2	1–3	1–0	1–0	3–1	1–0
Derry City	1–1		2–0	1–2	2–2	2–1	2–1	1–2	0–0	7–1
Derry City	1–0		1–1	0–1	3–0	0–0	0–0	1–1	1–0	3–0
Drogheda United	1–1	1–1		1–0	3–1	0–4	1–0	0–2	0–3	4–2
Drogheda United	0–1	1–1		1–0	2–0	0–2	1–1	3–1	0–0	1–1
Dundalk	3–1	2–2	4–1		3–0	1–0	0–0	2–1	2–1	2–0
Dundalk	2–1	1–1	2–0		3–0	1–2	1–0	0–0	3–3	3–0
Finn Harps	1–1	1–2	2–2	0–1		0–2	0–3	1–0	0–1	0–1
Finn Harps	0–2	1–2	3–0	1–2		2–2	0–1	1–1	3–2	1–3
St Patrick's Athletic	3–0	0–4	1–1	0–0	2–0		1–0	1–2	1–2	2–0
St Patrick's Athletic	3–1	0–1	3–0	1–1	2–1		1–2	4–0	1–0	2–1
Shamrock Rovers	1–0	1–0	3–1	1–0	3–1	1–0		2–0	2–2	3–0
Shamrock Rovers	1–0	1–0	1–1	3–0	5–1	4–1		3–2	3–1	1–0
Shelbourne	1–4	0–1	1–0	1–1	0–3	0–3	1–2		2–1	2–0
Shelbourne	1–1	0–1	6–0	0–0	3–1	4–4	0–0		0–2	1–1
Sligo Rovers	0–1	2–1	3–2	0–0	3–1	1–1	1–1	0–1		2–2
Sligo Rovers	2–1	0–0	2–0	0–3*	3–0	1–0	1–3	3–1		0–2
UCD	1–1	0–2	0–2	2–2	0–0	1–2	0–3	0–0	1–1	
UCD	1–3	0–1	2–1	3–2	2–1	1–2	0–2	0–2	0–2	

Source: , Extratime.ie
Legend: Blue = home team win; Yellow = draw; Red = away team win.
For upcoming matches, an "a" indicates there is an article about the rivalry between the two participants.

*Note Sligo Rovers defeated Dundalk 2–0 but the result was overturned by the Football Association of Ireland to a 3–0 win for Dundalk after it was ruled that Sligo had fielded a suspended player.

== Season statistics ==
=== Top scorers ===
Rank	Player	Club	Goals
1	(Republic of Ireland) Aidan Keena	Sligo Rovers	18
2	(Republic of Ireland) Eoin Doyle	St Patrick's Athletic	14
3	(Republic of Ireland) Graham Burke	Shamrock Rovers	11
3	(Northern Ireland) Jamie McGonigle	Derry City	11
3	(Republic of Ireland) Seán Boyd	Shelbourne	11
6	(England) Will Patching	Derry City	10
6	(Republic of Ireland) Rory Gaffney	Shamrock Rovers	10
8	(Republic of Ireland) Patrick Hoban	Dundalk	9
9	(Republic of Ireland) Dawson Devoy	Bohemians	8
10	(New Zealand) Max Mata	Sligo Rovers	7
10	(Republic of Ireland) Andy Lyons	Shamrock Fovers	7
10	(Republic of Ireland) Danny Mandroiu	Shamrock Rovers	7
10	(Republic of Ireland) Jack Moylan	Shelbourne	7

=== Clean sheets ===
Rank	Player	Club	Clean sheets
1	(Northern Ireland) Alan Mannus	Shamrock Rovers	15
1	(Republic of Ireland) Brian Maher	Derry City	15
3	(Wales) Nathan Shepperd	Dundalk	12
4	(Ghana) Joseph Anang	St Patrick’s Athletic	10
5	(Republic of Ireland) Brendan Clarke	Shelbourne	8
6	(Republic of Ireland) Ed McGinty	Sligo Rovers	5
7	(England) Richard Brush	Sligo Rovers	3
7	(Republic of Ireland) Colin McCabe	Drogheda United	3
7	(Republic of Ireland) Tadhg Ryan	Bohemians	3
7	(Republic of Ireland) Lorcan Healy	UCD	3
7	(Scotland) Sam Long	Drogheda United	3
7	(Republic of Ireland) Mark McGinley	Finn Harps	3
7	(Republic of Ireland) James Talbot	Bohemians	3

== Play-offs ==
=== Bracket ===
First Division play-off Semi-finals
26/29 October 2022
Treaty United	1	3	4
Waterford	4	3	7
26/29 October 2022
Longford Town	2	0	2
Galway United	2	3	5

First Division play-off Final
4 November 2022
Waterford	3
Galway United	0

Promotion/relegation play-off
11 November 2022
UCD	1
Waterford	0

=== First Division play-off Semi-finals ===
==== First leg ====
26 October 2022	Treaty United	1–4	Waterford	Limerick
19:45 IST	Enda Curran 62' (pen.)	Report	Phoenix Patterson 5'; Phoenix Patterson 29'; Junior Quitirna 70'; Sean Guerins 90+4' (o.g.)	Stadium: Markets Field; Referee: Damien MacGraith

26 October 2022	Longford Town	2–2	Galway United	Longford
19:45 IST	Jordan Adeyemo 28'; Jordan Adeyemo 54'	Report	Mikie Rowe 49'; Mikie Rowe 61'	Stadium: Bishopsgate; Referee: Kevin O'Sullivan

==== Second leg ====
29 October 2022	Waterford	3–3	Treaty United	Waterford
19:45 IST	Timi Sobowale 22'; Wassim Aouachria 48' (pen.); Phoenix Patterson 54'	Report	Mark Ludden 9' (pen.); Mark Ludden 26'; Lee Molloy 29'	Stadium: RSC; Attendance: 2,585; Referee: Paul Norton

30 October 2022	Galway United	3–0	Longford Town	Galway
16:00 IST	David Hurley 24'; Mikie Rowe 90'; Rob Manley 90+4'	Report		Stadium: Eamonn Deacy Park; Referee: Damien McGraith

=== First Division play-off Final ===
4 November 2022	Galway United	0–3	Waterford	County Limerick
19:45 IST		Report	Junior Quitirna 9'; Wassim Aouachria 45+1'; Junior Quitirna 81'	Stadium: Markets Field; Referee: Alan Patchell

=== Promotion/relegation play-off ===
11 November 2022	UCD	1–0	Waterford	County Dublin
19:45 IST	Tommy Lonergan 15'	Report		Stadium: Richmond Park; Attendance: 2781; Referee: Rob Harvey

== Awards ==
=== Monthly awards ===
Month	Player of the Month		Ref.
Month	Player	Club	Ref.
February	(Scotland) Steven Bradley	Dundalk	
March	(Republic of Ireland) Aidan Keena	Sligo Rovers	
April	(Northern Ireland) Jamie McGonigle	Derry City	
May	(Republic of Ireland) Daniel Kelly	Dundalk	
June	(Republic of Ireland) Mark Connolly	Dundalk	
July	(Republic of Ireland) Aidan Keena	Sligo Rovers	
August	(Republic of Ireland) Andy Lyons	Shamrock Rovers	
September	(Scotland) Phoenix Patterson	Waterford	
October	(Republic of Ireland) Rory Gaffney	Shamrock Rovers	
November	(England) Cameron McJannet	Derry City	

=== Annual awards ===
Award	Winner	Club
PFAI Player of the Year	Rory Gaffney	Shamrock Rovers
PFAI Young Player of the Year	Andy Lyons	Shamrock Rovers
PFAI Premier Division Manager of the Year	Stephen Bradley	Shamrock Rovers

PFAI Team of the Year
Goalkeeper	(Republic of Ireland) Brian Maher (Derry City)			
Defenders	(Northern Ireland) Cameron Dummigan (Derry City)	(Republic of Ireland) Mark Connolly (Derry City)	(Republic of Ireland) Joe Redmond (St Patrick's Athletic)	(Republic of Ireland) Andy Lyons (Shamrock Rovers)
Midfielders	(England) Will Patching (Derry City)	(Republic of Ireland) Jack Byrne (Shamrock Rovers)		(Republic of Ireland) Chris Forrester (St Patrick's Athletic)
Forwards	(Republic of Ireland) Aidan Keena (Sligo Rovers)	(Republic of Ireland) Rory Gaffney (Shamrock Rovers)		(Republic of Ireland) Seán Boyd (Shelbourne)

== See also ==
- 2022 President of Ireland's Cup
- 2022 FAI Cup
- 2022 League of Ireland First Division
- 2022 St Patrick's Athletic F.C. season
- 2022 Bohemian F.C. season
- 2022 Shelbourne F.C. season
- 2022 Dundalk F.C. season
