= 2023 President of Ireland's Cup =

- Event: President's Cup
Derry City	Shamrock Rovers
2	0
- Date: 10 February 2023
- Venue: Ryan McBride Brandywell Stadium, Derry
- Referee: Neil Doyle
- Attendance: 3,700

The 2023 President's Cup was the ninth edition of the President's Cup contested for. The match was played on 10 February between the champions of the 2022 League of Ireland Premier Division and the 2022 FAI Cup winners, Shamrock Rovers and Derry City.

== Summary ==
Derry City won the game 2–0 with first half goals from Will Patching and Michael Duffy to win the cup for the first time. The opening goal came after 23 minutes when Patching shot to the net from 10 yards out after a low pass from Duffy from the left. It was 2–0 in the 39th minute when Duffy's shot from distance went through the legs of Shamrock Rovers goalkeeper Leon Pöhls and in the net.

== See also ==
- 2023 League of Ireland Premier Division
- 2023 FAI Cup
