= 2021 League of Ireland Premier Division =

37th season of the League of Ireland Premier Division

League of Ireland Premier Division
- Season: 2021
- Dates: 19 March – 19 November 2021
- Champions: Shamrock Rovers (19th title)
- Relegated: Longford Town F.C., Waterford
- Champions League: Shamrock Rovers
- Europa Conference League: St Patrick's Athletic; Sligo Rovers; Derry City
- Matches: 180
- Goals: 458 (2.54 per match)
- Top goalscorer: Georgie Kelly (21 goals)
- Biggest home win: Bohemians 5–0 Drogheda United (18 June 2021), Finn Harps 5-0 Longford Town (19 November 2021)
- Biggest away win: Waterford 0–7 Drogheda United (8 May 2021)
- Highest scoring: Waterford 0–7 Drogheda United (8 May 2021)
- Longest winning run: Shamrock Rovers (7 games)
- Longest unbeaten run: Shamrock Rovers (11 games)
- Longest winless run: Longford Town (25 games)
- Longest losing run: Waterford (7 games); Longford Town (7 games)
- Highest attendance: 7,765 Shamrock Rovers 2-1 Drogheda United (19 November 2021)
- Lowest attendance: 0
- All statistics correct as of 20 November 2021.

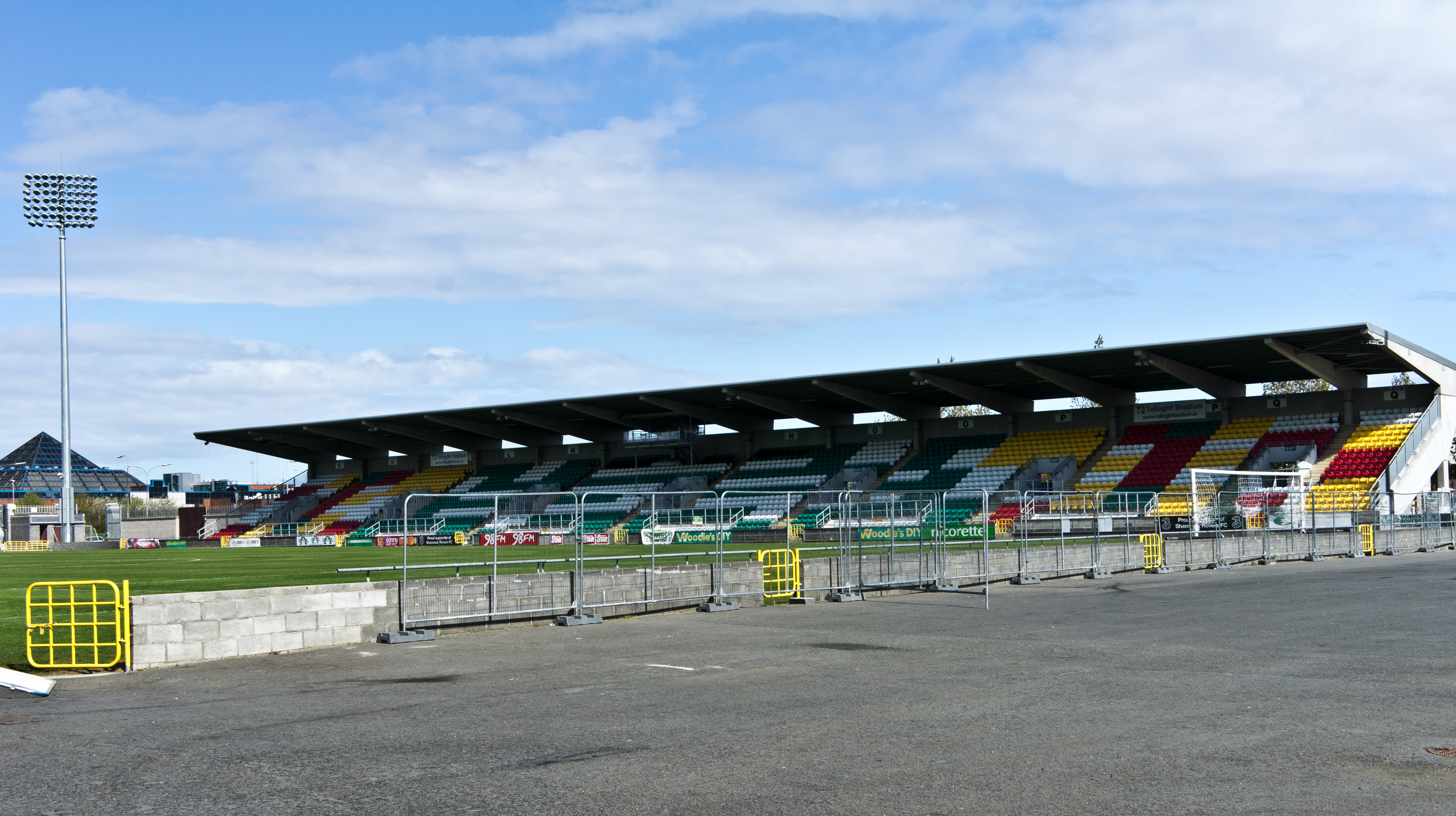
Tallaght Stadium

The 2021 League of Ireland Premier Division, known as the SSE Airtricity League Premier Division for sponsorship reasons, was the 37th season of the League of Ireland Premier Division, the top Irish league for association football clubs since its establishment in 1985. Shamrock Rovers were the defending champions, having won their sixth league title the previous season. Shamrock Rovers went on to retain the title.

== Impact of the COVID-19 pandemic ==
Due to the impact of the COVID-19 pandemic on sports in the Republic of Ireland, the FAI met with the National League Executive Committee on 2 January 2021 and a decision was reached to move the start date for the Premier Division until at least 19 March 2021.

== Teams ==
Ten teams compete in the league – the top eight teams from the previous season and the two teams promoted from the First Division. The promoted teams are Drogheda United and Longford Town, after respective top flight absences of four and five years. They replaced Cork City (relegated after nine years in the top flight), and Shelbourne (relegated via play-off after only a year back in the top flight).

=== Stadiums and locations ===
Locations of Premier Division teams
Locations of Dublin Premier Division teams

Team	Location	Stadium	Capacity
Bohemians	Dublin (Phibsborough)	Dalymount Park	3,640
Derry City	Derry	Ryan McBride Brandywell Stadium	3,700
Drogheda United	Drogheda	Head In The Game Park	3,500
Dundalk	Dundalk	Oriel Park	4,500
Finn Harps	Ballybofey	Finn Park	6,000
Longford Town	Longford	Bishopsgate	5,097
St Patrick's Athletic	Dublin (Inchicore)	Richmond Park	5,340
Shamrock Rovers	Dublin (Tallaght)	Tallaght Stadium	8,000
Sligo Rovers	Sligo	The Showgrounds	3,873
Waterford	Waterford	Regional Sports Centre	5,500

=== Personnel and kits ===
Note: Flags indicate national team as has been defined under FIFA eligibility rules. Players may hold more than one non-FIFA nationality.

Team	Manager	Captain	Kit manufacturer	Shirt sponsor
Bohemians	(Republic of Ireland) Keith Long	(Republic of Ireland) Keith Buckley	O'Neills	Des Kelly Interiors
Derry City	(Northern Ireland) Ruaidhrí Higgins	(Northern Ireland) Eoin Toal	Adidas	Diamond Corrugated
Drogheda United	(Republic of Ireland) Tim Clancy	(Republic of Ireland) Jake Hyland	Umbro	Scotch Hall Shopping Center
Dundalk	(Republic of Ireland) Vinny Perth	(Republic of Ireland) Brian Gartland	Umbro	Bet Regal
Finn Harps	(Republic of Ireland) Ollie Horgan	(Republic of Ireland) David Webster	Joma	Guild Esports
Longford Town	(Republic of Ireland) John Martin	(Republic of Ireland) Dean Zambra	Macron	Bishopsgate
St Patrick's Athletic	(Republic of Ireland) Stephen O'Donnell	(Republic of Ireland) Ian Bermingham	Umbro	MIG Insurance Brokers
Shamrock Rovers	(Republic of Ireland) Stephen Bradley	(Republic of Ireland) Ronan Finn	Umbro	888sport
Sligo Rovers	(Republic of Ireland) Liam Buckley	(Republic of Ireland) David Cawley	Joma	Avant Money
Waterford	(Canada) Marc Bircham	(Republic of Ireland) Oscar Brennan	Umbro	WIT Arena

==== Managerial changes ====
Team	Outgoing manager	Manner of departure	Date of vacancy	Position in table	Incoming manager	Date of appointment
Dundalk	(Italy) Filippo Giovagnoli	Change of role	10 March 2021	Pre-season	(Republic of Ireland) Shane Keegan	10 March 2021
Dundalk	(Republic of Ireland) Shane Keegan	Resigned	19 April 2021	9th	(Northern Ireland) Jim Magilton (interim)	19 April 2021
Derry City	(Northern Ireland) Declan Devine	Sacked	22 April 2021	10th	(Northern Ireland) Ruaidhrí Higgins	23 April 2021
Waterford	(Republic of Ireland) Kevin Sheedy	Resigned	5 May 2021	10th	(Republic of Ireland) Mike Geoghegan (interim)	5 May 2021
Waterford	(Republic of Ireland) Mike Geoghegan (interim)	End of interim spell	12 May 2021	10th	(Canada) Marc Bircham	12 May 2021
Dundalk	(Northern Ireland) Jim Magilton (interim)	End of interim spell	16 June 2021	8th	(Republic of Ireland) Vinny Perth	16 June 2021
Longford Town	(Republic of Ireland) Daire Doyle	Sacked	2 November 2021	10th	(Republic of Ireland) John Martin (interim)	2 November 2021
Waterford	(Canada) Marc Bircham	Sacked	23 November 2021	9th	(England) Ian Hendon	24 November 2021

== League table ==
=== Standings ===
Pos	Team	Pld	W	D	L	GF	GA	GD	Pts	Qualification or relegation
1	Shamrock Rovers (C)	36	24	6	6	59	28	+31	78	Qualification for Champions League first qualifying round
2	St Patrick's Athletic	36	18	8	10	56	42	+14	62	Qualification for Europa Conference League second qualifying round (Note: Since the winners of the 2021 FAI Cup (St Patrick's Athletic) qualified for European competition based on their league position, the final spot awarded to the Cup winner passed to the next best-placed team, i.e. fourth-placed team.)
3	Sligo Rovers	36	16	9	11	43	32	+11	57	Qualification for Europa Conference League first qualifying round
4	Derry City	36	14	12	10	49	42	+7	54	Qualification for Europa Conference League first qualifying round
5	Bohemians	36	14	10	12	60	46	+14	52	
6	Dundalk	36	13	9	14	44	46	−2	48	
7	Drogheda United	36	12	8	16	45	43	+2	44	
8	Finn Harps	36	11	11	14	44	52	−8	44	
9	Waterford (R)	36	12	6	18	36	56	−20	42	Qualification for relegation play-offs
10	Longford Town (R)	36	2	9	25	22	71	−49	15	Relegation to League of Ireland First Division

Source: SSE Airtricity League, Soccerway
Rules for classification: 1) Points; 2) Goal difference; 3) Goals scored.
(C) Champions; (R) Relegated

=== Positions by round ===
The table lists the positions of teams after each week of matches. In order to preserve chronological evolvements, any postponed matches are not included in the round at which they were originally scheduled but added to the full round they were played immediately afterward.

Team ╲ Round	1	2	3	4	5	6	7	8	9	10	11	12	13	14	15	16	17	18	19	20	21	22	23	24	25	26	27	28	29	30	31	32	33	34	35	36
Bohemians	8	7	9	6	6	6	6	8	7	6	6	6	6	5	5	5	4	4	4	5	4	4	4	4	5	5	6	5	5	5	5	5	5	4	4	5
Derry City	10	10	10	10	10	10	10	7	8	8	8	8	8	8	7	7	6	7	6	6	7	6	5	5	4	4	4	4	4	4	4	4	4	5	5	4
Drogheda United	2	5	6	4	5	5	5	5	5	5	4	4	4	4	4	4	5	5	5	4	5	5	6	6	6	6	5	6	6	6	6	6	6	7	7	7
Dundalk	4	7	8	9	9	8	7	6	6	7	7	7	7	7	8	8	7	6	7	7	6	7	7	7	9	9	9	9	8	8	7	7	7	6	6	6
Finn Harps	2	1	1	2	4	4	4	4	4	4	5	5	5	6	6	7	8	8	8	8	8	8	9	8	7	7	7	7	7	7	9	9	9	8	8	8
Longford Town	1	2	4	7	7	7	9	10	9	9	9	9	9	9	10	10	10	10	10	10	10	10	10	10	10	10	10	10	10	10	10	10	10	10	10	10
St Patrick's Athletic	4	3	1	1	2	3	1	1	2	2	2	3	3	3	3	2	1	1	3	3	2	2	2	2	2	2	2	2	2	2	2	2	2	2	2	2
Shamrock Rovers	4	6	5	5	1	1	2	2	1	1	1	1	2	2	1	1	2	2	1	1	1	1	1	1	1	1	1	1	1	1	1	1	1	1	1	1
Sligo Rovers	4	3	1	3	3	1	3	3	3	3	3	2	1	1	2	3	3	3	2	2	3	3	3	3	3	3	3	3	3	3	3	3	3	3	3	3
Waterford	8	9	7	8	8	9	8	9	10	10	10	10	10	10	9	9	9	9	9	9	9	9	8	9	8	8	8	8	9	9	8	8	8	9	9	9

Source: Extratime.com
= Leader and UEFA Champions League first qualifying round; = UEFA Conference League first qualifying round; = Qualification to the Relegation play-offs; = Relegation to the League of Ireland First Division

== Results ==
Teams will play each other four times (twice at home, twice away).

=== Matches 1–18 ===
Home \ Away	BOH	DER	DRO	DUN	FHA	LON	SHM	SLI	STP	WAT
Bohemians	—	1–2	5–0	5–1	4–0	2–2	1–0	1–3	0–1	3–0
Derry City	1–1	—	1–1	1–1	1–2	1–1	0–2	1–1	2–2	1–2
Drogheda United	1–1	1–2	—	0–1	1–1	4–1	0–1	1–1	3–1	1–0
Dundalk	0–1	2–1	2–1	—	1–2	1–1	2–1	0–1	1–1	1–3
Finn Harps	1–0	1–2	0–1	1–1	—	1–1	0–2	1–2	0–2	2–1
Longford Town	0–2	2–0	0–4	2–2	0–0	—	0–1	0–1	1–3	1–2
Shamrock Rovers	2–1	1–1	1–1	2–1	1–1	2–1	—	0–1	1–1	3–0
Sligo Rovers	4–0	0–1	1–2	1–1	1–0	2–0	1–1	—	1–1	3–0*
St Patrick's Athletic	2–1	2–0	2–1	0–2	4–1	3–0	1–2	2–0	—	1–0
Waterford	0–1	0–1	0–7	0–3	1–2	1–0	1–4	1–2	1–1	—

Source: , Extratime.ie
Legend: Blue = home team win; Yellow = draw; Red = away team win.
For upcoming matches, an "a" indicates there is an article about the rivalry between the two participants.

*Note Sligo Rovers were awarded a 3–0 victory by the FAI after Waterford opted out of playing the game due to COVID-19 cases in their squad.

=== Matches 19–36 ===
Home \ Away	BOH	DER	DRO	DUN	FHA	LON	SHM	SLI	STP	WAT
Bohemians	—	3–3	2–1	1–1	1–2	1–1	3–1	1–0	3–2	1–2
Derry City	1–1	—	3–0	1–0	2–2	3–0	2–4	2–0	1–0	2–0
Drogheda United	3–2	1–0	—	0–1	3–1	2–0	0–1	0–0	0–1	1–2
Dundalk	2–1	1–2	1–2	—	1–0	2–0	1–0	4–1	1–4	1–0
Finn Harps	1–2	1–1	0–0	2–2	—	5–0	2–1	2–2	3–1	0–1
Longford Town	1–4	0–2	1–1	1–0	0–3	—	0–1	0–1	1–4	1–1
Shamrock Rovers	1–1	2–1	2–1	3–1	3–0	1–0	—	2–0	3–1	2–0
Sligo Rovers	1–1	1–2	2–0	2–1	0–1	1–0	0–1	—	2–0	1–1
St Patrick's Athletic	2–2	1–0	2–0	1–0	2–2	3–2	0–1	0–3	—	2–1
Waterford	1–0	2–2	1–0	1–1	4–1	4–1	1–3	1–0	0–0	—

Source: , Extratime.ie
Legend: Blue = home team win; Yellow = draw; Red = away team win.
For upcoming matches, an "a" indicates there is an article about the rivalry between the two participants.

== Season statistics ==
=== Top scorers ===
Last updated after fixtures on 19 November 2021.

Rank	Player	Club	Goals
1	(Republic of Ireland) Georgie Kelly	Bohemians	21
2	(Republic of Ireland) Danny Mandroiu	Shamrock Rovers	15
3	(Republic of Ireland) Mark Doyle	Drogheda United	13
4	(Republic of Ireland) Patrick Hoban	Dundalk	12
5	(Scotland) Matty Smith	St Patrick's Athletic	11
5	(Republic of Ireland) Johnny Kenny	Sligo Rovers	11
5	(Republic of Ireland) Graham Burke	Shamrock Rovers	11
8	(Republic of Ireland) John Martin	Waterford	10
8	(Belgium) Tunde Owolabi	Finn Harps	10
10	(Republic of Ireland) Chris Lyons	Drogheda United	9
10	(Scotland) Liam Burt	Bohemians	9

=== Clean sheets ===
Last updated after fixtures on 19 November 2021.

Rank	Player	Club	Clean sheets
1	(Northern Ireland) Alan Mannus	Shamrock Rovers	13
2	(Republic of Ireland) Ed McGinty	Sligo Rovers	12
3	(Czech Republic) Vítězslav Jaroš	St Patrick's Athletic	11
4	(Northern Ireland) Nathan Gartside	Derry City	9
5	(Republic of Ireland) James Talbot	Bohemians	8
6	(Republic of Ireland) David Odumosu	Drogheda United	7
7	(Republic of Ireland) Mark McGinley	Finn Harps	6
8	(Scotland) Peter Cherrie	Dundalk	5
9	(Republic of Ireland) Brian Murphy	Waterford	3
9	(Albania) Alessio Abibi	Dundalk	3

== Play-offs ==
=== First Division play-off Semi-finals ===
==== First leg ====
3 November 2021	Bray Wanderers	0–0	Galway United	Carlisle Grounds
19:45 IST

3 November 2021	Treaty United	0–3	UCD	Markets Field
19:45 IST			Tadhg Ryan 34' (o.g.); Colm Whelan 79', 92'

==== Second leg ====
7 November 2021	Galway United	0–1 (0–1 agg.)	Bray Wanderers	Eamonn Deacy Park
17:00 IST			Brandon Kavanagh 22'

7 November 2021	UCD	1–2 (4–2 agg.)	Treaty United	UCD Bowl
17:00 IST	Adam Verdon 67'		Conor Melody 8'; Anthony O’Donnell 52'

=== First Division play-off Final ===
19 November 2021	Bray Wanderers	0–2	UCD	Dalymount Park
19:45 IST			Colm Whelan 68'; Paul Doyle 86'	Referee: Oliver Moran

=== Promotion/relegation play-off ===
26 November 2021	Waterford	1–2	UCD	Richmond Park
19:45 IST	Anthony Wordsworth 5'; Niall O'Keeffe (yellow card) 87' (yellow-red card)	Report	Dara Keane 26'; Colm Whelan 34'	Referee: Paul McLaughlin

== Awards ==
=== Monthly awards ===
Month	Player of the Month		Ref.
Month	Player	Club	Ref.
March/April	(Republic of Ireland) Chris Forrester	St Patrick's Athletic	
May	(Republic of Ireland) Greg Bolger	Sligo Rovers	
June	(Republic of Ireland) Georgie Kelly	Bohemians	
July	(Republic of Ireland) Dawson Devoy	Bohemians	
August	(Scotland) Ali Coote	Bohemians	
September	(Republic of Ireland) Georgie Kelly	Bohemians	
October	(Republic of Ireland) Danny Mandroiu	Shamrock Rovers	
November	(Republic of Ireland) Colm Whelan	UCD	

=== Annual awards ===
Award	Winner	Club
PFAI Player of the Year	(Republic of Ireland) Georgie Kelly	Bohemians
PFAI Young Player of the Year	(Republic of Ireland) Dawson Devoy	Bohemians
PFAI Premier Division Manager of the Year	(Republic of Ireland) Stephen Bradley	Shamrock Rovers

PFAI Team of the Year
Goalkeeper	(Republic of Ireland) James Talbot (Bohemians)			
Defenders	(Republic of Ireland) Ronan Boyce (Derry City)	(Cape Verde) Roberto Lopes (Shamrock Rovers)	(Republic of Ireland) Liam Scales (Shamrock Rovers)	(Republic of Ireland) James Brown (Drogheda United)
Midfielders	(Republic of Ireland) Chris Forrester (St Patrick's Athletic)	(Republic of Ireland) Dawson Devoy (Bohemians)		(England) Will Patching (Derry City/Dundalk)
Forwards	(Republic of Ireland) Rory Gaffney (Shamrock Rovers)	(Republic of Ireland) Georgie Kelly (Bohemians)		(Scotland) Liam Burt (Bohemians)

== See also ==
- 2021 President of Ireland's Cup
- 2021 FAI Cup
- 2021 League of Ireland First Division
- 2021 Bohemian F.C. season
- 2021 Dundalk F.C. season
- 2021 St Patrick's Athletic F.C. season
