= 2020 Dundalk F.C. season =

Dundalk
2020 season
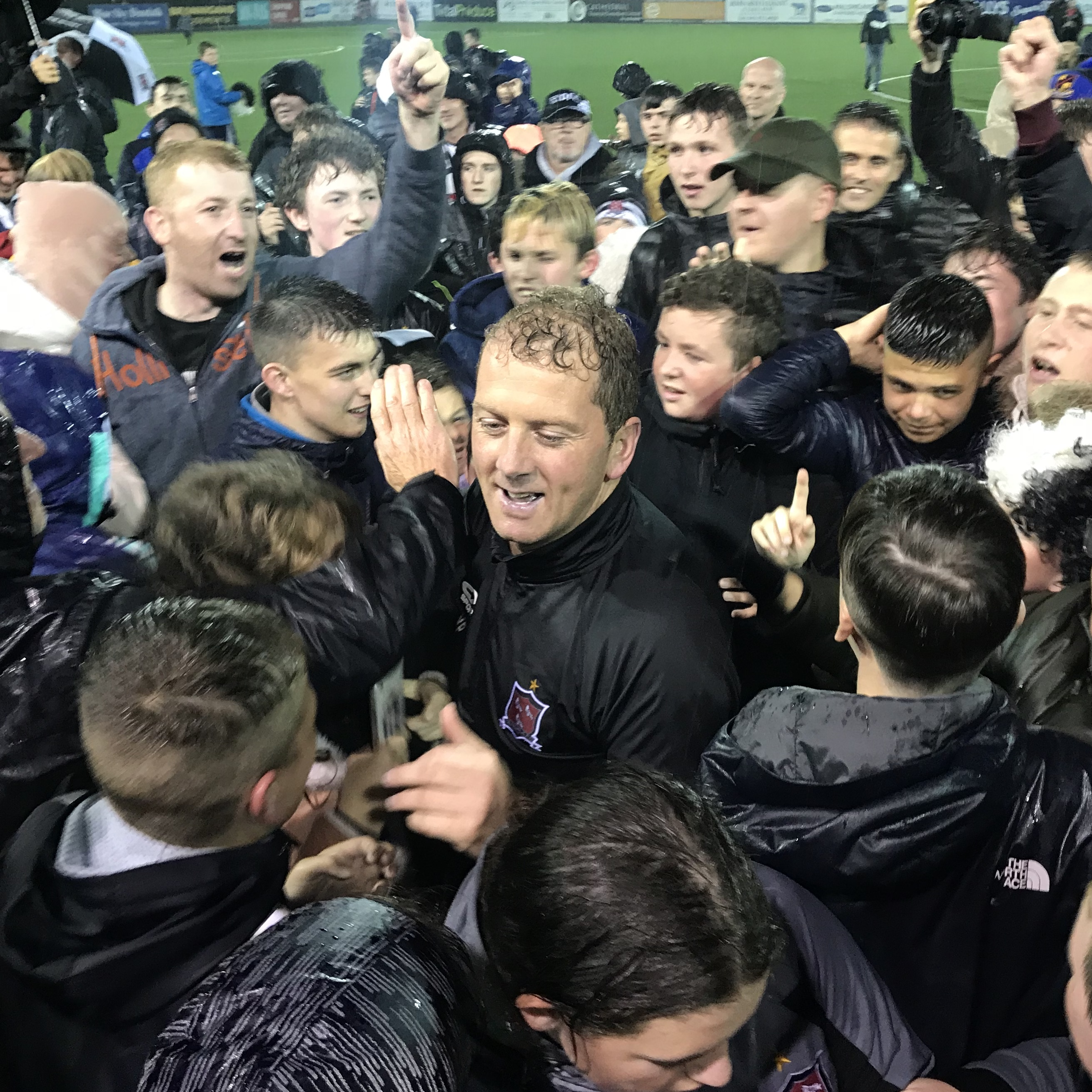
- Vinny Perth, former Dundalk manager, celebrating the 2019 league title success with supporters in Oriel Park
- Manager: Vinny Perth (until 20 August); Filippo Giovagnoli (from 26 August as Interim Head Coach)
- Premier Division: 3rd
- FAI Cup: Winners
- League Cup: Cancelled
- President's Cup: Cancelled
- Leinster Senior Cup: Abandoned
- Champions League: First qualifying round
- Europa League: Group stage
- Top goalscorer: League: Patrick Hoban (10); All: Patrick Hoban & David McMillan (11)
- Highest home attendance: 3,156 (Vs. Derry City 14 February 2020)
Home colours	Away colours

Dundalk entered the 2020 season as the reigning League Champions and League of Ireland Cup holders from 2019. Having qualified for European football for the seventh season in a row, they were entered in the 2020–21 UEFA Champions League. It was manager Vinny Perth's second season as manager until his dismissal following Dundalk's exit from Europe in the first qualifying round of the Champions League. The 2020 season was Dundalk's 12th consecutive season in the top tier of Irish football, their 85th in all, and their 94th in the League of Ireland.

== Season summary ==
After the postponement of the President's Cup due to storm conditions, the scheduled double-double round-robin 36 round League programme commenced on 14 February 2020 and was due to be completed on 23 October 2020. The season was predicted to be a two-horse race between Dundalk and Shamrock Rovers. Both sides won their opening three matches before Rovers won their first encounter, 3–2, in Tallaght Stadium. That game was notable for a goal by Dundalk's Jordan Flores, which was subsequently nominated for the FIFA Puskás Award.

Subsequently, the outbreak of the COVID-19 pandemic saw the cessation of football in line with other European countries ahead of the Round Six match at home to St Patrick's Athletic. The League of Ireland Cup, sponsored by EA Sports, was deferred for the season. The Leinster Senior Cup was abandoned. During the stoppage, assistant manager Ruaidhrí Higgins departed his role for a new role under former Dundalk manager Stephen Kenny with the Republic of Ireland national football team. He was replaced by Alan Reynolds, who had earlier resigned as manager of Waterford.

The league season resumed on 31 July 2020 with a reduced schedule of 18 matches in total. Matches were played behind closed doors for the remainder of the shortened season as part of the Irish government's response to the pandemic. In Europe, Dundalk entered the 2020–21 UEFA Champions League as the seeded team in the first qualifying round. They were drawn away to Celje and defeated 3–0 in the single-leg tie, which was played at Szusza Ferenc Stadion, Budapest (Hungary) because of travel restrictions related to the COVID-19 pandemic between Slovenia and Ireland. In the aftermath of that defeat, manager Vinny Perth was sacked by the club.

On 26 August Filippo Giovagnoli was confirmed as the new manager of Dundalk, with nine league matches remaining. John Gill and Alan Reynolds left the club the following week. After being defeated in the Champions League first qualifying round, they drew Andorran champions Inter Club d'Escaldes in the Europa League second qualifying round, and won 1–0. They were drawn away again in the second round, and defeated Sheriff Tiraspol in Moldova in a penalty shoot-out, following a 1–1 draw. The victory gave Dundalk a chance to reach the group stage for the first time since 2016. In the play-off round, they faced KÍ of Klaksvík in the Faroe Islands at the Aviva Stadium, and won 3–1. Meanwhile, they continued to struggle in the league and eventually finished third, thus qualifying for the new UEFA Europa Conference League.

Dundalk were seeded fourth for the group stage and were drawn in Group B alongside Arsenal, Rapid Wien, and Molde. In the first match at home to Molde, Dundalk took a first half lead through Sean Murray, before going down 2–1. Matchday 2 was the first away match, which was against Arsenal at the Emirates Stadium. It finished 3–0 to the home side. Matchday 3 away to Rapid in Vienna finished 4–3 to the home side after Dundalk had taken the lead. They failed to pick up any points from the second set of matches, and finished bottom of the group on 0 points. They also received a €50,000 fine from Uefa for 'shadow coaching', as interim head coach Filippo Giovagnoli did not hold a Uefa Pro Licence.

In the FAI Cup, which also had a schedule change as a result of the pandemic, they reached the final after wins over Waterford, Cobh Ramblers, Bohemians, and Athlone Town. The 11–0 semi-final victory over Athlone Town saw Dundalk set a new record for the biggest win in the competition's history, and was also a new club record victory. They followed that with a 4–2 extra time victory over the holders, Shamrock Rovers, with David McMillan scoring a hat-trick, to win the Cup for the twelfth time.

=== First-Team Squad (2020) ===
Sources: Note: Substitute appearances in brackets

No.	Name	DOB	Pos.	Debut	League		FAI Cup		EA Cup		Europe		Others		Totals	
No.	Name	DOB	Pos.	Debut	Apps	Goals	Apps	Goals	Apps	Goals	Apps	Goals	Apps	Goals	Apps	Goals
1	(Republic of Ireland) Gary Rogers	25 September 1981	GK	2015	13	0	5	0	0	0	9	0	0	0	27	0
2	(Republic of Ireland) Seán Gannon	11 July 1991	DF	2014	12 (3)	0	2 (2)	0	0	0	7 (2)	0	0	0	28	0
3	(Republic of Ireland) Brian Gartland	4 November 1986	DF	2013	7 (1)	1	4	0	0	0	7 (1)	0	0	0	20	1
4	(Republic of Ireland) Seán Hoare	15 March 1994	DF	2017	9 (1)	0	2 (2)	2	0	0	8 (1)	1	0	0	23	3
5	(Republic of Ireland) Chris Shields	27 December 1990	MF	2012	16 (1)	0	5	1	0	0	9	1	0	0	31	2
6	(England) Jordan Flores	4 October 1995	MF	2019	11 (3)	3	0 (3)	1	0	0	4 (1)	2	0	0	22	6
7	(Northern Ireland) Michael Duffy	28 July 1994	MF	2017	15 (1)	4	5	3	0	0	9 (1)	0	0	0	31	7
8	(Republic of Ireland) John Mountney	22 February 1993	MF	2012	4 (7)	0	1 (4)	1	0	0	2 (6)	0	0	0	24	1
9	(Republic of Ireland) Patrick Hoban	28 July 1991	FW	2013	13 (2)	10	1	0	0	0	6 (1)	1	0	0	23	11
10	(Republic of Ireland) Greg Sloggett	3 July 1996	MF	2020	10 (4)	2	4	0	0	0	7 (1)	0	0	0	26	2
11	(Republic of Ireland) Patrick McEleney	26 September 1992	MF	2016	4 (5)	0	2 (2)	1	0	0	4 (4)	0	0	0	21	1
12	(Republic of Ireland) Andrew Quinn (Note: promoted from U19s 27 September 2020)	24 January 2002	DF	2018	1	0	0	0	0	0	0	0	0	0	1	0
14	(Republic of Ireland) Dane Massey	17 April 1988	DF	2013	7 (1)	1	1	1	0	0	0	0	0	0	9	2
15	(Republic of Ireland) Darragh Leahy	15 April 1998	DF	2020	5 (3)	0	2 (1)	0	0	0	7 (1)	0	0	0	19	0
16	(Republic of Ireland) Seán Murray	11 October 1993	MF	2019	5 (3)	1	1 (1)	1	0	0	5 (3)	3	0	0	18	5
17	(Nigeria) Nathan Oduwa (Note: signed March 2020)	5 March 1996	FW	2020	4 (6)	0	0 (2)	1	0	0	1 (3)	0	0	0	16	1
18	(England) Will Patching	18 October 1998	MF	2020	2 (5)	0	2	0	0	0	0	0	0	0	9	0
20	(Republic of Ireland) Aaron McCarey	14 January 1992	GK	2019	5	0	0	0	0	0	1	0	0	0	6	0
21	(Republic of Ireland) Daniel Cleary	9 March 1996	DF	2018	12	1	3	0	0	0	7 (1)	1	0	0	23	2
22	(Serbia) Stefan Čolović	16 April 1994	MF	2020	8 (6)	1	3	0	0	0	4 (4)	0	0	0	25	1
23	(Scotland) Cammy Smith (Note: on loan from Dundee United until 30 June 2020)	24 August 1995	FW	2020	5	0	0	0	0	0	0	0	0	0	5	0
23	(Northern Ireland) Cameron Dummigan (Note: on loan to Crusaders until 30 June 2020)	2 June 1996	DF	2019	5 (2)	0	3	0	0	0	3 (2)	0	0	0	15	0
24	(Republic of Ireland) Jamie Wynne (Note: promoted from U19s 27 September 2020)	30 July 2001	FW	2020	0	0	0	0	0	0	0 (1)	0	0	0	1	0
27	(Republic of Ireland) Daniel Kelly	21 May 1996	MF	2019	9 (4)	0	0 (4)	0	0	0	1 (4)	1	0	0	22	1
29	(Republic of Ireland) David McMillan (Note: signed July 2020)	14 December 1988	FW	2015	5 (6)	0	4 (1)	8	0	0	4 (4)	3	0	0	24	11
30	(Republic of Ireland) Jimmy Corcoran	1 February 2002	GK	2020	0	0	0	0	0	0	0	0	0	0	0	0
44	(Republic of Ireland) Andy Boyle	7 March 1991	DF	2013	11 (1)	1	3	1	0	0	6 (1)	0	0	0	22	2
45	(United States) Josh Gatt (Note: signed July 2020, departed 5 November 2020)	29 August 1991	MF	2020	1 (1)	0	0 (1)	0	0	0	0	0	0	0	3	0

==== Out on loan ====
No.	Name	DOB	Pos.	Debut	League		FAI Cup		EA Cup		Europe		Others		Totals	
No.	Name	DOB	Pos.	Debut	Apps	Goals	Apps	Goals	Apps	Goals	Apps	Goals	Apps	Goals	Apps	Goals
12	(Republic of Ireland) Georgie Kelly (Note: on loan to St Patrick's Athletic until end of 2020 season)	12 November 1996	FW	2018	0 (2)	0	0	0	0	0	0	0	0	0	2	0
28	(Democratic Republic of the Congo) Lido Lotefa (Note: on loan to Longford Town until end of 2020 season)	18 April 2000	FW	2019	0 (1)	0	0	0	0	0	0	0	0	0	1	0
25	(United States) Taner Dogan (Note: on loan to Athlone Town until end of 2020 season)	30 May 1998	DF	2020	0	0	0	0	0	0	0	0	0	0	0	0

== Competitions ==
=== Premier Division ===
14 February 2020 Round 1	Dundalk	1–0	Derry City	Oriel Park
19:45	Dane Massey 79'	Report		Attendance: 3,156; Referee: Neil Doyle

21 February 2020 Round 2	Shelbourne	1–2	Dundalk	Tolka Park
19:45	Gary Deegan 52'	Report	Andy Boyle 18'; Patrick Hoban 43'	Attendance: 3,010; Referee: Damien McGraith

24 February 2020 Round 3	Dundalk	3–0	Cork City	Oriel Park
19:45	Michael Duffy 16'; Patrick Hoban 63'; Jordan Flores 66'	Report		Attendance: 2,243; Referee: Paul McLoughlin

28 February 2020 Round 4	Shamrock Rovers	3–2	Dundalk	Tallaght Stadium
19:45	Dylan Watts 20'; Roberto Lopes 71'; Jack Byrne 83'	Report	Jordan Flores 23'; Patrick Hoban 63'	Attendance: 7,522; Referee: Rob Hennessey

6 March 2020 Round 5	Finn Harps	0–4	Dundalk	Finn Park
20:00	Patrick Hoban 3', 52'; Michael Duffy 37'; Greg Sloggett 83'	Report		Attendance: 1,582; Referee: Rob Harvey

31 July 2020 Round 6	Dundalk	1–1	St Patrick's Athletic	Oriel Park
19:45	Patrick Hoban 23'	Report	Robbie Benson 23'	Attendance: 0 Referee: Rob Harvey

7 August 2020 Round 7	Bohemians	2–1	Dundalk	Dalymount Park
17:45	Danny Grant 7'; Keith Buckley 15'	Report	Michael Duffy 42'	Attendance: 0 Referee: Neil Doyle

14 August 2020 Round 8	Dundalk	2–2	Waterford	Oriel Park
17:45	Patrick Hoban 83'; Daniel Cleary 90'	Report	Matty Smith 24'; Kurtis Byrne 50'	Attendance: 0 Referee: Ray Matthews

22 August 2020 Round 9	Sligo Rovers	3–1	Dundalk	The Showgrounds
17:00	Donelan 12'; De Vries 51'; Junior 62'	Report	Stefan Čolović 76'	Attendance: 0 Referee: Robert Hennessy

11 September 2020 Round 10	Dundalk	3–2	Shelbourne	Oriel Park
19:45	Michael Duffy 3'; Brian Gartland 11'; Greg Sloggett 60'	Report	Dan Byrne 20'; Georgie Poynton 24'	Attendance: 0 Referee: Paul McLaughlin

27 September 2020 Round 11	Dundalk	0–4	Shamrock Rovers	Oriel Park
19:45		Report	Jack Byrne 36', 85'; Liam Scales 44'; Aaron McEneff 45' (pen.)	Attendance: 100; Referee: Rob Harvey

4 October 2020 Round 12	Dundalk	0–0	Finn Harps	Oriel Park
17:30		Report		Attendance: 100; Referee: Paul McLaughlin

14 October 2020 Round 13	Cork City	0–2	Dundalk	Turners Cross
19:45	Patrick Hoban 73' 75'	Report		Attendance: 0 Referee: Neil Doyle

16 October 2020 Round 14	Dundalk	0–0	Bohemians	Oriel Park
17:45		Report		Attendance: 0 Referee: Damien McGraith

19 October 2020 Round 15	Derry City	1–2	Dundalk	Ryan McBride Brandywell Stadium
17:45	Darren Cole 18'	Report	Murray 7'; Jordan Flores 15'	Attendance: 0 Referee: Rob Harvey

25 October 2020 Round 16	Waterford	1–0	Dundalk	Waterford Regional Sports Centre
14:00	John Martin 57'	Report		Attendance: 0 Referee: Sean Grant

1 November 2020 Round 17	St Patrick's Athletic	1–1	Dundalk	Richmond Park
17:45	Robbie Benson 63'	Report	Patrick Hoban 22'	Attendance: 0 Referee: Paul McLaughlin

9 November 2020 Round 18	Dundalk	0–2	Sligo Rovers	Oriel Park
19:30		Report	Devers 10'; Coughlan 90'	Attendance: 0 Referee: Derek Tomney

==== League table ====
Pos	Team	Pld	W	D	L	GF	GA	GD	Pts	Qualification or relegation
1	Shamrock Rovers (C)	18	15	3	0	44	7	+37	48	Qualification for Champions League first qualifying round
2	Bohemians	18	12	1	5	23	12	+11	37	Qualification for Europa Conference League first qualifying round (Note: Since the winners of the 2020 FAI Cup (Dundalk) qualified for European competition based on their league position, the final spot awarded to the Cup winner passed to the next best-placed team, i.e. fourth-placed team.)
3	Dundalk	18	7	5	6	25	23	+2	26	Qualification for Europa Conference League first qualifying round
4	Sligo Rovers	18	8	1	9	19	23	−4	25	Qualification for Europa Conference League first qualifying round
5	Waterford	18	7	3	8	17	22	−5	24	
6	St Patrick's Athletic	18	5	6	7	14	17	−3	21	
7	Derry City	18	5	5	8	18	18	0	20	
8	Finn Harps	18	5	5	8	15	24	−9	20	
9	Shelbourne (R)	18	5	4	9	13	22	−9	19	Qualification for relegation play-offs
10	Cork City (R)	18	2	5	11	10	30	−20	11	Relegation to League of Ireland First Division

Source: SSE Airtricity League, Soccerway
Rules for classification: 1) Points; 2) Goal difference; 3) Goals scored.
(C) Champions; (R) Relegated

=== FAI Cup ===
11 August 2020 Round 1	Dundalk	1–0	Waterford	Oriel Park
19:45	Seán Hoare 17'	Report		Attendance: 50; Referee: Paul McLaughlin

30 August 2020 Round 2	Cobh Ramblers	0–2	Dundalk	St Colman's Park
17:00		Report	Dane Massey 29'; David McMillan 75' (pen.)	Attendance: 50; Referee: Alan Patchell

21 November 2020 Quarter Final	Bohemians	1–4	Dundalk	Dalymount Park
19:45	Andre Wright 11' (pen.)	Report	Michael Duffy 2'; David McMillan 35' (pen.), 39'; Nathan Oduwa 88'	Attendance: 0 Referee: Rob Harvey

29 November 2020 Semi Final	Athlone Town	0–11	Dundalk	Athlone Town Stadium
19:05		Report	Michael Duffy 4', 9'; Andy Boyle 13'; John Mountney 29'; Patrick McEleney 36'; David McMillan 39', 64'; Chris Shields 55'; Nathan Oduwa 60'; Jordan Flores 74'; Sean Murray 83'	Attendance: 0 Referee: Rob Hennessy

6 December 2020 Final	Shamrock Rovers	2–4 (a.e.t.)	Dundalk	Ballsbridge, Dublin
18:40	Dylan Watts (yellow card) 16'; Joey O'Brien (yellow card) 45+3'; Aaron Greene 49'; Liam Scales (yellow card) 71'; Roberto Lopes 74'; Graham Burke (yellow card) 98'	Report	Greg Sloggett (yellow card) 64'; David McMillan 69', 72' (pen.), 117'; Chris Shields (yellow card) 97'; Brian Gartland (yellow card) 105'; Seán Hoare 111'	Stadium: Aviva Stadium; Attendance: 0 Referee: Rob Harvey
Note: Live coverage on RTÉ2

=== League Cup ===
Competition cancelled due to COVID-19 pandemic.

=== Leinster Senior Cup ===
Competition abandoned due to COVID-19 pandemic.

=== Europe ===
==== Champions League ====
First qualifying round

19 August 2020
19:00

Celje (Slovenia)	3–0	(Republic of Ireland) Dundalk
Kerin 43'; Vizinger 89'; Dangubić 90+5'	Report

Szusza Ferenc Stadion, Budapest (Hungary) (Note: Celje played their second qualifying round home match against Dundalk at Szusza Ferenc Stadion, Budapest (Hungary), instead of their regular stadium Stadion Z'dežele, Celje, due to travel restrictions related to the COVID-19 pandemic between Slovenia and Ireland.)
Attendance: 0
Referee: Vítor Ferreira (Portugal)

==== Europa League ====
Second qualifying round

17 September 2020
19:30

Inter Club d'Escaldes (Andorra)	0–1	(Republic of Ireland) Dundalk
	Report	McMillan 14'

Estadi Comunal, Andorra la Vella
Attendance: 0
Referee: Viktor Shimusik (Belarus)

Third qualifying round

24 September 2020
20:00 (21:00 EEST)

Sheriff Tiraspol (Moldova)	1–1 (a.e.t.)	(Republic of Ireland) Dundalk
Posmac 8'	Report	Murray 45'
Penalties
Kapić (penalty scored); Obilor (penalty missed); Veloso (penalty scored); Parra (penalty scored)	3–5	(penalty scored) Čolović; (penalty scored) Hoban; (penalty scored) Hoare; (penalty scored) McEleney; (penalty scored) Shields

Sheriff Stadium, Tiraspol
Referee: Aleksandar Stavrev (North Macedonia)
1 October 2020
20:30 (19:30 IST)

Dundalk (Republic of Ireland)	3–1	(Faroe Islands) KÍ
Murray 33'; Cleary 48'; Kelly 79'	Report	Midtskogen 66'

Aviva Stadium, Dublin
Attendance: 0
Referee: Maurizio Mariani (Italy)

===== Group stage =====
The group stage draw was held on 2 October 2020.

Pos	Team	Pld	W	D	L	GF	GA	GD	Pts	Qualification	ARS	MOL	RW	DUN
1	(England) Arsenal	6	6	0	0	20	5	+15	18	Advance to knockout phase	—	4–1	4–1	3–0
2	(Norway) Molde	6	3	1	2	9	11	−2	10	Advance to knockout phase	0–3	—	1–0	3–1
3	(Austria) Rapid Wien	6	2	1	3	11	13	−2	7		1–2	2–2	—	4–3
4	(Republic of Ireland) Dundalk	6	0	0	6	8	19	−11	0		2–4	1–2	1–3	—

Source: UEFA
Rules for classification: Group stage tiebreakers

22 October 2020 1	Dundalk (Republic of Ireland)	1–2	(Norway) Molde	Dublin, Ireland
18:55 CEST	Murray 35'	Report	Hussain 62'; Omoijuanfo 72' (pen.)	Stadium: Tallaght Stadium; Attendance: 0 Referee: Petri Viljanen (Finland)

29 October 2020 2	Arsenal (England)	3–0	(Republic of Ireland) Dundalk	London, England
20:00 GMT	Nketiah 42'; Willock 44'; Pépé 46'	Report		Stadium: Emirates Stadium; Attendance: 0 Referee: Filip Glova (Slovakia)

5 November 2020 3	Rapid Wien (Austria)	4–3	(Republic of Ireland) Dundalk	Vienna, Austria
18:55 CET	Ljubicic 22'; Arase 79'; Hofmann 87'; Demir 90'	Report	Hoban 7'; McMillan 82' (pen.), 90+6' (pen.)	Stadium: Allianz Stadion; Attendance: 0 Referee: Trustin Farrugia Cann (Malta)

26 November 2020 4	Dundalk (Republic of Ireland)	1–3	(Austria) Rapid Wien	Dublin, Ireland
21:00 CET	Shields 63' (pen.)	Report	Knasmüllner 11'; Kara 37', 58'	Stadium: Aviva Stadium; Attendance: 0 Referee: Tamás Bognár (Hungary)

3 December 2020 5	Molde (Norway)	3–1	(Republic of Ireland) Dundalk	Molde, Norway
21:00 CET	Wolff Eikrem 30'; Omoijuanfo 41'; Ellingsen 67'	Report	Flores 90+4'	Stadium: Aker Stadion; Attendance: 600; Referee: Daniel Siebert (Germany)

10 December 2020 6	Dundalk (Republic of Ireland)	2–4	(England) Arsenal	Dublin, Ireland
18:55 CET	Flores 22'; Hoare 85'	Report	Nketiah 12'; Elneny 18'; Willock 67'; Balogun 80'	Stadium: Aviva Stadium; Attendance: 0 Referee: Ivan Bebek (Croatia)

== Awards ==
=== Player of the Month ===
Month	Player	Reference
October	(Republic of Ireland) Sean Murray	
November	(Republic of Ireland) David McMillan	

=== FIFA Puskás Award (nomination) ===
Rank	Player	Team	Opponent	Score	Competition	Goal
	(England) Jordan Flores	(Republic of Ireland) Dundalk	(Republic of Ireland) Shamrock Rovers	2–3	2020 League of Ireland Premier Division	nominated goal
