= Patrick Hoban =

Irish footballer

Personal information
- Full name: Patrick James Hoban
- Date of birth: 28 July 1991 (age 35)
- Place of birth: Loughrea, County Galway, Ireland
- Position: Forward

Team information
- Current team: Glentoran
- Number: 9

Youth career
- –2008: Mervue United

Senior career*
| Years | Team | Apps | (Gls) |
| 2008–2010 | Mervue United | 30 | (4) |
| 2010–2011 | Bristol City | 0 | (0) |
| 2010–2011 | → Clevedon Town (loan) | 4 | (0) |
| 2011–2012 | Mervue United | 40 | (14) |
| 2013–2014 | Dundalk | 60 | (34) |
| 2015–2016 | Oxford United | 43 | (3) |
| 2016 | → Stevenage (loan) | 1 | (0) |
| 2016 | → Grimsby Town (loan) | 10 | (0) |
| 2016–2017 | Mansfield Town | 21 | (4) |
| 2018–2024 | Dundalk | 171 | (87) |
| 2024–2025 | Derry City | 38 | (15) |
| 2025– | Glentoran | 33 | (27) |
- * Club domestic league appearances and goals as of 22:32, 7 October 2026 (UTC)

Patrick James Hoban (born 28 July 1991) is an Irish professional footballer who plays for Glentoran in the NIFL Premiership, as a forward.

He had his greatest successes in two spells at Dundalk, where he scored a total of 150 goals, making him the club's all-time record goalscorer. He finished as top scorer as they won the League of Ireland Premier Division in 2014 and 2018, and won another title in 2019.

== Career ==
=== Early career ===
Born in Loughrea, County Galway, to an English mother, Hoban played both hurling and football as a youth. He represented his town at hurling, winning the 2009 minor hurling title with Loughrea. Hoban played association football with Mervue United and was part of the A Championship team that won promotion to the League of Ireland, coming off the bench in both legs of the 2008 play-off finals that ended in a 5–2 aggregate victory over Kildare County.

In July 2010, Hoban journeyed to England after being offered to train with Championship club Bristol City, managed by Steve Coppell and having just signed England international goalkeeper David James. In November he signed a one-year contract, along fellow 19-year-old Irishman Jimmy Keohane. He scored regularly for the Robins' reserve team but did not break into the first team, being loaned to local non-league team Clevedon Town. He made six appearances for Clevedon, four of which came in the Southern League Division One. His only goal came in a Southern League Cup tie against Taunton Town in January 2011. He was later released by Bristol City.

=== Dundalk ===
Hoban returned to Mervue United and then moved to League of Ireland Premier Division side Dundalk in 2013. In his first season at Oriel Park, he scored 15 times as the Lilywhites came runners-up to St. Patrick's Athletic; this included a hat-trick on 12 July in a 3–0 home win over Bohemians.

He was top scorer with 20 goals as they won the 2014 title, their first for 19 years. On 24 July that year, he scored the winning goal in their 2–1 win away to Hajduk Split in the second leg of the second qualifying round of the UEFA Europa League, but they lost 3–2 on aggregate to the Croatians. The team also won the League of Ireland Cup with a 3–2 victory over Shamrock Rovers on 19 September, Hoban scoring their third goal to seal a first trophy in 12 years.

=== Oxford United ===
Hoban signed with English League Two side Oxford United in November 2014, having turned down the chance to play on trial at Scottish Premier League club Kilmarnock. The contract did not take effect until 1 January. He made his professional debut on 17 January 2015 in a 3–2 home loss to Southend United, replacing Cheyenne Dunkley at half time. Hoban totalled 20 appearances that season for the U's, mostly starting, but scored just once to open a 2–1 comeback win over Carlisle United at the Kassam Stadium on 28 March.

Having scored three times in 43 League appearances (26 of them as a substitute) he joined Stevenage in the same division on a month's loan on 1 February 2016. He played his one game for them on 6 February, starting in a 1–0 home to Crawley Town and having a good opportunity to score saved by Jamie Jones.

On 1 March 2016, Hoban joined National League side Grimsby Town on loan until the end of the season. He played in Grimsby's 3–1 victory over Forest Green Rovers in the 2016 National League play-off final at Wembley Stadium, seeing the Mariners promoted to League Two after a six-year absence from the Football League. Hoban did not score in his 14 total appearances, and was not retained when his loan expired. He was released by Oxford at the end of the season.

=== Mansfield Town ===
Following his release from Oxford, Hoban stayed in League Two and joined Mansfield Town in June 2016. He made his debut on 6 August as they began the season with a 3–2 win at Newport County, playing the final six minutes in place of Matt Green, and on 1 October he scored his first goal for the Stags, opening a 1–1 draw at Crewe Alexandra by heading Kevan Hurst's cross.

On 10 January 2017, Hoban scored both goals in the final six minutes as Mansfield defeated Oldham Athletic in the third round of the EFL Trophy at Field Mill. He was released at the end of the 2016–17 season.

=== Return to Dundalk ===
On 24 November 2017 Hoban rejoined Dundalk. The following 11 February he played in the FAI President's Cup, a 4–2 home loss to Cork City, filling in for the last 23 minutes in place of Krisztián Adorján. On 19 July, in the Europa League first qualifying round second leg, he scored in a 2–1 (3–1 aggregate) win over Estonia's Levadia Tallinn.

Hoban was voted League of Ireland Premier Division Player of the Month in June 2018 after scoring five goals in four games that month, including three in a 4–0 home win over Limerick on 8 June. On 5 October, he scored a late equaliser in a 1–1 home draw with St Patrick's Athletic to win Dundalk's 13th league title. He finished the season as top scorer with 29 goals but left the last league game injured, causing concern over whether he would play the FAI Cup Final against Cork City.

On 9 February, Hoban scored as Dundalk defeated Cork 2–1 at Turners Cross to win the 2019 President of Ireland's Cup. He was sent off on 3 May in a 2–2 home draw with Derry City, after having scored twice. Dundalk retained their league title, and Hoban was the second highest scorer with 13 goals, one behind Junior Ogedi-Uzokwe of Derry. Dundalk also won the League Cup, with Hoban scoring four times in a 6–1 win over Bohemians in the semi-final on 19 August. Additionally, he scored the last goal of a 6–0 win (7–1 aggregate) over Northern Irish champions Linfield in the Champions Cup on 11 November. On 16 October 2019, Hoban signed a contract for two more seasons at Dundalk.

On 6 March 2020, Hoban scored twice in a 4–0 win at Finn Harps to reach 100 Irish top-flight goals, the 44th player to reach that landmark. His 100th goal in all competitions for Dundalk came on 31 July, in a 1–1 home draw with St Patrick's Athletic. In the 2020 Europa League third qualifying round, he scored in the penalty shoot-out against Sheriff Tiraspol helping Dundalk qualify for the playoffs. Dundalk went on to qualify for the 2020–21 UEFA Europa League group stage and he scored the opening goal but lost 4–3 against Rapid Vienna in the 2020–21 UEFA Europa League group stage. In the 2021–22 Europa Conference League 3rd round qualifiers He scored 1 goal against Vitesse Arnhem, but lost 2–1.

On 5 June 2023, Hoban equalled the club's all-time league goalscoring record of 142, set by Joey Donnelly, after scoring a hat-trick against UCD at Oriel Park.

On 10 January 2024, Dundalk announced that they had agreed a fee for Hoban with Derry City, meaning he would be departing after 294 appearances and a record 150 goals over his two spells with the club.

=== Derry City ===
It was announced on 10 January 2024 that Hoban had signed a two-year contract with League of Ireland Premier Division side Derry City for an initial fee of €30,000. After departing the club in July 2025, Hoban stated that he would never forgive newly appointed Derry manager Tiernan Lynch for "wasting six months of my career" by freezing him out from the squad and extremely limiting his game time at the club after Hoban had been the league's joint top goalscorer in his first season at the club under previous manager Ruaidhrí Higgins.

=== Glentoran ===
On 10 July 2025, Hoban signed for NIFL Premiership club Glentoran on a 2-year contract for an undisclosed fee. On 3 January 2026, he scored 6 goals in a 7–0 win away to Carrick Rangers before being substituted off in the 53rd minute. He scored 31 goals in 39 appearances in all competitions in his first season with the club, before remarkably being linked with a move to Paraguayan side Club Libertad in May 2026.

== Career statistics ==
As of match played on 8 August 2026

Appearances and goals by club, season and competition
| Club | Season | League | | | National Cup (Note: Includes FAI Cup, FA Cup & Irish Cup) | | League Cup (Note: Includes League of Ireland Cup, EFL Cup & Northern Ireland Football League Cup) | | Europe | | Other | | Total | |
| Club | Season | Division | Apps | Goals | Apps | Goals | Apps | Goals | Apps | Goals | Apps | Goals | Apps | Goals |
|---|---|---|---|---|---|---|---|---|---|---|---|---|---|---|
| Mervue United | 2008 | A Championship | 0 | 0 | 0 | 0 | 0 | 0 | — | | (Note: Appearances in 2008 A Championship Playoffs) | 0 | 2 | 0 |
| Mervue United | 2009 | LOI First Division | 18 | 3 | 0 | 0 | 0 | 0 | — | | — | | 18 | 3 |
| Mervue United | 2010 | LOI First Division | 12 | 1 | 1 | 0 | 0 | 0 | — | | — | | 13 | 1 |
| Mervue United | Total | | 30 | 4 | 1 | 0 | 0 | 0 | — | | 2 | 0 | 33 | 4 |
| Bristol City | 2010–11 | EFL Championship | 0 | 0 | 0 | 0 | 0 | 0 | — | | — | | 0 | 0 |
| Clevedon Town (loan) | 2010–11 | Southern League | 4 | 0 | 0 | 0 | — | | — | | 2 | 1 | 6 | 1 |
| Mervue United | 2011 | LOI First Division | 13 | 5 | 0 | 0 | 0 | 0 | — | | — | | 13 | 5 |
| Mervue United | 2012 | LOI First Division | 27 | 9 | 3 | 3 | 1 | 0 | — | | — | | 31 | 12 |
| Mervue United | Total | | 40 | 14 | 3 | 3 | 1 | 0 | — | | — | | 44 | 17 |
| Dundalk | 2013 | LOI Premier Division | 28 | 14 | 4 | 3 | 0 | 0 | — | | 1 (Note: Appearance in Leinster Senior Cup) | 1 | 33 | 18 |
| Dundalk | 2014 | LOI Premier Division | 32 | 20 | 2 | 1 | 1 | 1 | 3 (Note: Appearances in UEFA Europa League) | 1 | 6 (Note: 1 appearance in Leinster Senior Cup, 5 appearances & 1 goal in Setanta Sports Cup) | 1 | 44 | 24 |
| Dundalk | Total | | 60 | 34 | 6 | 4 | 1 | 1 | 3 | 1 | 7 | 2 | 77 | 42 |
| Oxford United | 2014–15 | EFL League Two | 20 | 1 | 0 | 0 | — | | — | | — | | 20 | 1 |
| Oxford United | 2015–16 | EFL League Two | 23 | 2 | 4 | 2 | 2 | 0 | — | | 4 (Note: Appearances in EFL Trophy) | 1 | 33 | 5 |
| Oxford United | Total | | 43 | 3 | 4 | 2 | 2 | 0 | — | | 4 | 1 | 53 | 6 |
| Stevenage (loan) | 2015–16 | EFL League Two | 1 | 0 | — | | — | | — | | — | | 1 | 0 |
| Grimsby Town (loan) | 2015–16 | National League | 12 | 0 | — | | — | | — | | 2 (Note: Appearances in FA Trophy) | 0 | 14 | 0 |
| Mansfield Town | 2016–17 | EFL League Two | 21 | 4 | 0 | 0 | 0 | 0 | — | | 3 | 2 | 24 | 6 |
| Dundalk | 2018 | LOI Premier Division | 36 | 29 | 4 | 2 | 0 | 0 | 4 | 1 | 1 (Note: Appearance in President's Cup) | 0 | 45 | 32 |
| Dundalk | 2019 | LOI Premier Division | 34 | 13 | 3 | 0 | 2 | 4 | 6 (Note: 4 appearances & 1 goal in UEFA Champions League, 2 appearances in UEFA Europa League) | 1 | 3 (Note: 2 appearances, 1 goal in Champions Cup & 1 appearance, 1 goal in President's Cup) | 2 | 48 | 20 |
| Dundalk | 2020 | LOI Premier Division | 15 | 10 | 1 | 0 | — | | 7 (Note: 1 appearance in UEFA Champions League, 6 appearances in UEFA Europa League) | 1 | — | | 23 | 11 |
| Dundalk | 2021 | LOI Premier Division | 27 | 12 | 4 | 7 | — | | 3 (Note: Appearances in UEFA Europa Conference League) | 1 | 1 | 0 | 35 | 20 |
| Dundalk | 2022 | LOI Premier Division | 25 | 9 | 1 | 1 | — | | — | | — | | 26 | 10 |
| Dundalk | 2023 | LOI Premier Division | 34 | 14 | 2 | 0 | — | | 4 | 1 | 0 | 0 | 40 | 15 |
| Dundalk | Total | | 171 | 87 | 15 | 10 | 2 | 4 | 24 | 5 | 5 | 2 | 217 | 108 |
| Derry City | 2024 | LOI Premier Division | 30 | 14 | 5 | 0 | — | | 2 (Note: Appearances in UEFA Conference League) | 1 | — | | 37 | 15 |
| Derry City | 2025 | LOI Premier Division | 8 | 1 | — | | — | | — | | — | | 8 | 1 |
| Derry City | Total | | 38 | 15 | 5 | 0 | — | | 2 | 1 | — | | 45 | 16 |
| Glentoran | 2025–26 | NIFL Premiership | 32 | 26 | 2 | 2 | 4 | 1 | — | | 1 (Note: Appearances in County Antrim Shield) | 2 | 39 | 31 |
| Glentoran | 2026–27 | NIFL Premiership | 1 | 1 | 0 | 0 | 0 | 0 | 2 | 0 | 0 | 0 | 3 | 1 |
| Glentoran | Total | | 33 | 27 | 2 | 2 | 4 | 1 | 2 | 0 | 1 | 2 | 42 | 32 |
| Career total | | | 433 | 188 | 36 | 21 | 10 | 6 | 30 | 7 | 24 | 9 | 533 | 231 |

== Honours ==
Dundalk

- League of Ireland Premier Division: 2014, 2018, 2019
- League of Ireland Cup: 2014, 2019
- FAI Cup: 2018, 2020
- President of Ireland's Cup: 2019, 2021
- Champions Cup: 2019

Grimsby Town

- National League play-offs: 2016

=== Individual ===
- Dundalk all-time record goalscorer: 150 goals
- League of Ireland Premier Division top scorer (4): 2014, 2018, 2020, 2024
- League of Ireland Premier Division Player of the Month (4): July 2013, October 2014, June 2018, June 2023
