= 2025–26 NIFL Premiership =

Season of Irish football

NIFL Premiership
- Season: 2025–26
- Dates: 9 August 2025 – 25 April 2026
- Champions: Larne
- Relegated: Glenavon
- UEFA Champions League: Larne
- UEFA Conference League: Coleraine; Glentoran; Linfield
- Top goalscorer: Patrick Hoban (25 goals)

The 2025–26 NIFL Premiership (known as the Sports Direct Premiership for sponsorship reasons) was the 18th season of the NIFL Premiership, the highest level of league football in Northern Ireland and the 125th season of Irish League football overall.

== Teams ==
The league consisted of twelve teams; the top eleven teams from the previous season, and one team promoted from the NIFL Championship. Linfield entered the season as defending champions.

The promoted team was the 2024–25 NIFL Championship champions Bangor (returning to the top flight after a sixteen-year absence). They replaced the 2024–25 NIFL Premiership bottom-placed team Loughgall (relegated from the top flight after two years).

=== Stadia and locations ===
Locations of the 2025–26 NIFL Premiership teams
Locations of the Belfast-based 2025–26 NIFL Premiership teams

Club	Stadium	Location	Capacity
Ballymena United	The Showgrounds	Ballymena	3,824 (all seated)
Bangor	Clandeboye Park	Bangor	1,895 (500 seated)
Carrick Rangers	Loughshore Hotel Arena	Carrickfergus	2,100 (380 seated)
Cliftonville	Solitude	Belfast	3,054 (all seated)
Coleraine	The Showgrounds	Coleraine	4,843 (1,607 seated)
Crusaders	Seaview	Belfast	3,208 (all seated)
Dungannon Swifts	Stangmore Park	Dungannon	2,000 (300 seated)
Glenavon	Mourneview Park	Lurgan	3,302 (all seated)
Glentoran	The Oval	Belfast	6,054 (3,991 seated)
Larne	Inver Park	Larne	2,732 (1,632 seated)
Linfield	Windsor Park	Belfast	18,434 (all seated)
Portadown	Shamrock Park	Portadown	3,940 (2,765 seated)

=== Personnel and sponsoring ===
Team	Manager	Captain	Kit manufacturer	Shirt sponsor (front)
Ballymena United	(Northern Ireland) Oran Kearney	(Northern Ireland) Sean O'Neill	Playr-Fit	Wrightbus
Bangor	(Northern Ireland) Lee Feeney	(Northern Ireland) Lewis Harrison	Macron	bailieproperty.com
Carrick Rangers	(Northern Ireland) Stephen Baxter	(Northern Ireland) Luke McCullough	Puma	Hankook
Cliftonville	(Northern Ireland) Jim Magilton	(Republic of Ireland) Rory Hale	O'Neills	Sean Graham
Coleraine	(Northern Ireland) Ruaidhrí Higgins	(Northern Ireland) Lyndon Kane	Macron	Fibrus
Crusaders	(Northern Ireland) Declan Caddell	(Northern Ireland) Jarlath O'Rourke	Adidas	BoyleSports
Dungannon Swifts	(Northern Ireland) Rodney McAree	(Burundi) Gaël Bigirimana	Uhlsport	Ten Square Hotel
Glenavon	(Northern Ireland) Michael O'Connor	(Northern Ireland) Barney McKeown	Adidas	Avondale Foods
Glentoran	(Northern Ireland) Declan Devine	(Northern Ireland) Marcus Kane	Macron	Bet McLean
Larne	(Northern Ireland) Gary Haveron	(Northern Ireland) Tomás Cosgrove	Nike	Pride & Pinion
Linfield	(Northern Ireland) David Healy	(Northern Ireland) Jamie Mulgrew	Macron	Ready Construction
Portadown	(Northern Ireland) David Jeffrey	(Northern Ireland) Gary Thompson	Adidas	DFDS

=== Managerial changes ===
Team	Outgoing	Manner	Exit date		Position in table	Incoming	Incoming date		Ref.
Team	Outgoing	Manner	Announced on	Departed on	Position in table	Incoming	Announced on	Arrived on	Ref.
Larne	(England) Nathan Rooney	Mutual consent	18 August 2025		10th	(Northern Ireland) Gary Haveron (Note: Haveron was initially appointed as interim manager, before being appointed permanent manager on 15 October 2025.)	18 August 2025		
Glenavon	(Northern Ireland) Paddy McLaughlin	Sacked	28 September 2025		12th	(Northern Ireland) David McDaid (interim)	30 September 2025		
Glenavon	(Northern Ireland) David McDaid	End of caretaker spell	11 October 2025		12th	(Northern Ireland) Michael O'Connor	11 October 2025		
Ballymena United	(Northern Ireland) Jim Ervin	Sacked	30 November 2025		8th	(Northern Ireland) Ciaran Caldwell (interim)	30 November 2025		
Ballymena United	(Northern Ireland) Ciaran Caldwell	End of caretaker spell	7 December 2025		9th	(Northern Ireland) Oran Kearney	7 December 2025		
Portadown	(Northern Ireland) Niall Currie	Sacked	15 April 2026		8th	(Northern Ireland) Gary Thompson (interim)	17 April 2026		
Portadown	(Northern Ireland) Gary Thompson	End of caretaker spell	22 April 2026		8th	(Northern Ireland) David Jeffrey	22 April 2026		

== Regular season ==
=== League table ===
Pos	Team	Pld	W	D	L	GF	GA	GD	Pts	Qualification
1	Larne	33	22	7	4	60	22	+38	73	Qualification for the Section A
2	Glentoran	33	21	6	6	63	30	+33	69	Qualification for the Section A
3	Coleraine	33	20	5	8	62	31	+31	65	Qualification for the Section A
4	Linfield	33	18	8	7	56	24	+32	62	Qualification for the Section A
5	Cliftonville	33	13	8	12	49	48	+1	47	Qualification for the Section A
6	Dungannon Swifts	33	15	1	17	40	58	−18	46	Qualification for the Section A
7	Carrick Rangers	33	12	7	14	49	51	−2	43	Qualification for the Section B
8	Bangor	33	10	6	17	38	57	−19	36	Qualification for the Section B
9	Portadown	33	11	3	19	36	57	−21	36	Qualification for the Section B
10	Ballymena United	33	9	7	17	39	50	−11	34	Qualification for the Section B
11	Crusaders	33	7	5	21	38	72	−34	26	Qualification for the Section B
12	Glenavon	33	8	1	24	33	63	−30	25	Qualification for the Section B

Source: Northern Ireland Football League
Rules for classification: 1) Points; 2) Goal difference; 3) Number of goals scored; 4) Head-to-head points; 5) Head-to-head goal difference; 6) Drawing of lots

=== Results ===
For matches 1–22, each team plays every other team twice (home and away). For matches 23–33, each team plays every other team for the third time (either at home or away).

Home \ Away	BAL	BAN	CRK	CLF	COL	CRU	DUN	GLA	GLT	LAR	LIN	POR
Ballymena United	—	4–0	1–1	2–2	1–3	2–2	0–2	2–2	0–2	0–2	1–0	1–1
Ballymena United	—	—	2–1	—	2–0	2–0	1–2	—	—	0–2	—	—
Bangor	2–3	—	0–1	3–1	2–1	1–3	2–1	1–3	1–1	0–2	0–3	1–0
Bangor	2–0	—	—	1–1	0–2	2–1	—	—	0–4	—	0–1	—
Carrick Rangers	1–2	3–2	—	1–2	1–1	1–2	3–3	1–0	0–7	1–2	0–0	1–0
Carrick Rangers	—	1–1	—	0–1	—	—	5–1	2–1	—	—	2–0	1–2
Cliftonville	3–2	3–1	1–4	—	0–0	1–2	2–0	3–1	0–4	1–1	0–0	1–2
Cliftonville	2–2	—	—	—	1–0	5–2	—	5–2	—	0–2	2–0	—
Coleraine	1–0	2–0	2–1	1–0	—	5–1	2–0	5–1	1–2	1–0	2–2	2–1
Coleraine	—	—	3–1	—	—	—	4–0	2–0	—	1–2	3–1	—
Crusaders	1–1	2–2	3–4	0–1	0–4	—	2–0	4–1	0–2	0–1	0–1	0–4
Crusaders	—	—	2–2	—	0–2	—	—	0–3	2–3	2–4	—	—
Dungannon Swifts	2–0	1–0	0–2	2–1	3–1	0–3	—	1–0	3–1	2–0	1–4	1–4
Dungannon Swifts	—	0–1	—	3–2	—	2–0	—	—	0–2	1–2	—	4–2
Glenavon	0–2	0–3	1–0	2–1	1–2	0–2	0–2	—	3–1	0–3	2–1	3–0
Glenavon	3–1	1–2	—	—	—	—	0–1	—	1–2	—	0–3	—
Glentoran	2–0	1–0	1–1	2–2	2–1	5–1	0–1	2–0	—	1–4	1–1	2–1
Glentoran	2–1	—	1–0	3–0	1–1	—	—	—	—	—	—	2–1
Larne	2–0	1–1	2–0	0–0	3–0	4–0	2–1	1–0	1–0	—	0–0	4–0
Larne	—	2–1	2–3	—	—	—	—	2–1	2–2	—	1–1	3–0
Linfield	2–1	6–1	3–1	1–0	1–1	1–0	3–0	2–0	0–1	0–0	—	3–0
Linfield	2–1	—	—	—	—	4–0	6–0	—	1–0	—	—	3–1
Portadown	0–2	1–4	0–3	2–3	1–4	2–1	1–0	3–1	0–1	2–1	2–0	—
Portadown	1–0	1–1	—	0–2	0–2	0–0	—	1–0	—	—	—	—

Source: Northern Ireland Football League
Legend: Blue = home team win; Yellow = draw; Red = away team win.
For upcoming matches, an "a" indicates there is an article about the rivalry between the two participants.

== Matches 34–38 ==
For the final five matches, the table splits into two halves, with the top six teams forming Section A and the bottom six teams forming Section B. Each team plays every other team in their respective section once. The fixtures are reversed from those played during rounds 23–33, ensuring that teams have played every other team in their respective section twice at home and twice away overall throughout the season.

=== Section A ===
==== League table ====
Pos	Team	Pld	W	D	L	GF	GA	GD	Pts	Qualification
1	Larne (C)	38	25	8	5	73	26	+47	83	Qualification for the Champions League first qualifying round
2	Coleraine	38	25	5	8	83	37	+46	80	Qualification for the Conference League second qualifying round (Note: Coleraine qualified for the Conference League second qualifying round as the 2025–26 Irish Cup winners. Since they qualified based on league position, the Conference League first qualifying round spot was passed to the third-placed team.)
3	Glentoran	38	23	8	7	73	38	+35	77	Qualification for the Conference League first qualifying round
4	Linfield (O)	38	19	9	10	61	33	+28	66	Qualification for the Conference League first qualifying round play-off
5	Cliftonville	38	15	8	15	55	59	−4	53	Qualification for the Conference League first qualifying round play-off
6	Dungannon Swifts	38	15	1	22	42	77	−35	46	Qualification for the Conference League first qualifying round play-off

Source: Northern Ireland Football League
Rules for classification: 1) Points; 2) Goal difference; 3) Number of goals scored; 4) Head-to-head points; 5) Head-to-head goal difference; 6) Drawing of lots
(C) Champions; (O) Play-off winners

==== Results ====
Home \ Away	CLF	COL	DUN	GLT	LAR	LIN
Cliftonville	—	—	1–0	1–2	—	—
Coleraine	6–2	—	—	6–2	—	—
Dungannon Swifts	—	1–2	—	—	—	1–3
Glentoran	—	—	5–0	—	0–0	1–1
Larne	2–0	1–4	8–0	—	—	—
Linfield	1–2	0–3	—	—	0–2	—

Source: Northern Ireland Football League
Legend: Blue = home team win; Yellow = draw; Red = away team win.
For upcoming matches, an "a" indicates there is an article about the rivalry between the two participants.

=== Section B ===
==== League table ====
Pos	Team	Pld	W	D	L	GF	GA	GD	Pts	Qualification or relegation
7	Carrick Rangers	38	15	8	15	64	58	+6	53	Qualification for the Conference League first qualifying round play-off
8	Portadown	38	13	5	20	44	66	−22	44	
9	Ballymena United	38	10	9	19	46	58	−12	39	
10	Bangor	38	10	9	19	41	65	−24	39	
11	Crusaders (O)	38	10	6	22	48	81	−33	36	Qualification for the NIFL Premiership play-off
12	Glenavon (R)	38	8	4	26	37	69	−32	28	Relegation to the NIFL Championship

Source: Northern Ireland Football League
Rules for classification: 1) Points; 2) Goal difference; 3) Number of goals scored; 4) Head-to-head points; 5) Head-to-head goal difference; 6) Drawing of lots
(O) Play-off winners; (R) Relegated

==== Results ====
Home \ Away	BAL	BAN	CRK	CRU	GLA	POR
Ballymena United	—	0–0	—	—	1–1	1–2
Bangor	—	—	0–3	—	0–0	2–4
Carrick Rangers	2–3	—	—	6–1	—	—
Crusaders	3–2	1–1	—	—	—	4–0
Glenavon	—	—	2–3	0–1	—	1–1
Portadown	—	—	1–1	—	—	—

Source: Northern Ireland Football League
Legend: Blue = home team win; Yellow = draw; Red = away team win.
For upcoming matches, an "a" indicates there is an article about the rivalry between the two participants.

== Play-offs ==
=== Conference League play-off ===
Teams placed 3rd–7th qualified for one-off play-off matches, with the winners earning the second spot in the 2026–27 UEFA Conference League first qualifying round; the higher-placed team per game received home advantage. Since the 2025–26 Irish Cup winners (Coleraine) finished in the top seven (2nd), the 3rd-placed team (Glentoran) qualified automatically for the Conference League first qualifying round and the spot was vacated. The 4th-placed team (Linfield) qualified directly to the final by winning the 2025–26 BetMcLean Cup.

=== Quarter-final ===
6 May 2026	Dungannon Swifts (6th)	3–1	Carrick Rangers (7th)	Dungannon
19:45	Alves 21'; Marron 49'; Dillon 70'		McCullough 38'	Stadium: Stangmore Park; Referee: Shane Andrews

=== Semi-final ===
9 May 2026	Cliftonville (5th)	1–2	Dungannon Swifts (6th)	Belfast
18:00	Conlan 34'		Glenny 30'; Dillon 74'	Stadium: Solitude; Referee: Chris Morrison

=== Final ===
12 May 2026	Linfield (4th)	3–1	Dungannon Swifts (6th)	Belfast
19:45	Fitzpatrick 14', 64', 70'		Moore 87'	Stadium: Windsor Park; Referee: Tony Clarke

=== NIFL Premiership play-off ===
The eleventh-placed team (Crusaders) faced the second-placed team of the 2025–26 NIFL Championship (Annagh United) in a two-legged play-off for the final place in the 2026–27 NIFL Premiership.

==== First leg ====
28 April 2026	Annagh United	2–3	Crusaders	Portadown
19:45	Rogers 24'; Upton 45'		Dunlop 45+2'; Bryden 54'; Maguire 90+1'	Stadium: BMG Arena

==== Second leg ====
1 May 2026	Crusaders	1–2 (a.e.t.) (4–4 agg.) (3–1 p)	Annagh United	Belfast
19:45	Nixon 71'		Donnelly 5'; Upton 53'	Stadium: Seaview
	Penalties
	Forsythe (penalty scored); Brooks (penalty scored); McCart (penalty scored)		Young (penalty scored); Convie (penalty missed); Taylor (penalty missed); Johnson (penalty missed)
