= 2024–25 NIFL Premiership =

Season of Irish football

NIFL Premiership
- Season: 2024–25
- Dates: 10 August 2024 – 26 April 2025
- Champions: Linfield
- Relegated: Loughgall
- UEFA Champions League: Linfield
- UEFA Conference League: Cliftonville; Dungannon Swifts; Larne
- Matches: 228
- Goals: 576 (2.53 per match)
- Top goalscorer: Matthew Shevlin (17 goals)
- Biggest home win: Linfield 5–1 Loughgall (24 August 2024)
- Biggest away win: Loughgall 1–5 Cliftonville (14 September 2024)
- Highest scoring: Linfield 5–1 Loughgall (24 August 2024)
- All statistics correct as of 16 November 2024.

The 2024–25 NIFL Premiership (known as the Sports Direct Premiership for sponsorship reasons) was the 17th season of the NIFL Premiership, the highest level of league football in Northern Ireland and the 124th season of Irish League football overall.

Linfield won the title for the 57th time.

== Teams ==
The league consisted of twelve teams; the top twelve teams from the previous season, and one team promoted from the NIFL Championship. Larne entered the season as defending champions (for the second consecutive season).

The promoted team was the 2023–24 NIFL Championship champions Portadown (returning to the top-flight after a one-season absence). They replaced the 2023–24 NIFL Premiership bottom-placed team Newry City.

=== Stadia and locations ===
Locations of the 2024–25 NIFL Premiership teams
Locations of the Belfast-based 2024–25 NIFL Premiership teams

| Club | Stadium | Location | Capacity |
|---|---|---|---|
| Ballymena United | The Showgrounds | Ballymena | 3,824 (all seated) |
| Carrick Rangers | Loughshore Hotel Arena | Carrickfergus | 2,100 (380 seated) |
| Cliftonville | Solitude | Belfast | 3,054 (all seated) |
| Coleraine | The Showgrounds | Coleraine | 4,843 (1,607 seated) |
| Crusaders | Seaview | Belfast | 3,208 (all seated) |
| Dungannon Swifts | Stangmore Park | Dungannon | 2,000 (300 seated) |
| Glenavon | Mourneview Park | Lurgan | 3,302 (all seated) |
| Glentoran | The Oval | Belfast | 6,054 (3,991 seated) |
| Larne | Inver Park | Larne | 2,732 (1,632 seated) |
| Linfield | Windsor Park | Belfast | 18,434 (all seated) |
| Loughgall | Lakeview Park | Loughgall | 3,000 |
| Portadown | Shamrock Park | Portadown | 3,940 (2,765 seated) |

== Regular season ==
=== League table ===
| Pos | Team | Pld | W | D | L | GF | GA | GD | Pts | Qualification |
|---|---|---|---|---|---|---|---|---|---|---|
| 1 | Linfield | 33 | 24 | 4 | 5 | 61 | 23 | +38 | 76 | Qualification for the Section A |
| 2 | Larne | 33 | 15 | 9 | 9 | 39 | 28 | +11 | 54 | Qualification for the Section A |
| 3 | Glentoran | 33 | 15 | 9 | 9 | 40 | 31 | +9 | 54 | Qualification for the Section A |
| 4 | Dungannon Swifts | 33 | 15 | 5 | 13 | 44 | 40 | +4 | 50 | Qualification for the Section A |
| 5 | Crusaders | 33 | 15 | 5 | 13 | 41 | 43 | −2 | 50 | Qualification for the Section A |
| 6 | Coleraine | 33 | 13 | 10 | 10 | 49 | 41 | +8 | 49 | Qualification for the Section A |
| 7 | Cliftonville | 33 | 13 | 7 | 13 | 44 | 37 | +7 | 46 | Qualification for the Section B |
| 8 | Portadown | 33 | 13 | 7 | 13 | 39 | 38 | +1 | 46 | Qualification for the Section B |
| 9 | Ballymena United | 33 | 13 | 4 | 16 | 40 | 42 | −2 | 43 | Qualification for the Section B |
| 10 | Glenavon | 33 | 10 | 9 | 14 | 35 | 43 | −8 | 39 | Qualification for the Section B |
| 11 | Carrick Rangers | 33 | 6 | 9 | 18 | 24 | 48 | −24 | 27 | Qualification for the Section B |
| 12 | Loughgall | 33 | 4 | 6 | 23 | 29 | 71 | −42 | 18 | Qualification for the Section B |

Source: Northern Ireland Football League
Rules for classification: 1) Points; 2) Goal difference; 3) Number of goals scored; 4) Head-to-head points; 5) Head-to-head goal difference; 6) Drawing of lots

=== Results ===
For matches 1–22, each team plays every other team twice (home and away). For matches 23–33, each team plays every other team for the third time (either at home or away).

| Home \ Away | BYM | CRK | CLF | COL | CRU | DUN | GLA | GLT | LAR | LIN | LGL | POR | BYM | CRK | CLF | COL | CRU | DUN | GLA | GLT | LAR | LIN | LGL | POR |
|---|---|---|---|---|---|---|---|---|---|---|---|---|---|---|---|---|---|---|---|---|---|---|---|---|
| Ballymena United | — | 1–2 | 3–2 | 0–1 | 0–1 | 0–1 | 3–1 | 1–0 | 1–2 | 0–2 | 4–1 | 0–3 | — | — | 1–0 | — | — | — | 0–2 | 1–1 | — | 2–2 | — | 2–0 |
| Carrick Rangers | 1–4 | — | 2–0 | 2–1 | 3–0 | 0–1 | 2–0 | 2–3 | 1–2 | 1–3 | 0–0 | 0–1 | 0–0 | — | — | 0–1 | 0–0 | — | — | 0–0 | 1–0 | — | 0–0 | — |
| Cliftonville | 0–1 | 3–0 | — | 2–1 | 1–0 | 1–0 | 0–0 | 1–2 | 1–3 | 0–0 | 4–0 | 1–0 | — | 3–0 | — | — | — | 0–2 | — | 2–0 | — | — | 2–0 | 2–2 |
| Coleraine | 4–2 | 3–1 | 0–0 | — | 1–2 | 4–1 | 0–2 | 2–1 | 1–1 | 0–3 | 2–0 | 2–0 | 2–2 | — | 2–2 | — | 0–2 | — | — | 1–2 | — | — | — | 1–0 |
| Crusaders | 1–0 | 2–1 | 1–1 | 2–1 | — | 2–2 | 0–1 | 1–3 | 1–3 | 2–3 | 3–1 | 0–3 | 3–1 | — | 2–0 | — | — | 1–5 | — | — | — | 0–2 | 1–1 | 3–2 |
| Dungannon Swifts | 1–0 | 4–0 | 1–4 | 1–1 | 1–0 | — | 2–0 | 1–0 | 0–1 | 0–1 | 1–3 | 2–0 | 0–3 | 3–1 | — | 1–1 | — | — | 2–3 | — | — | 0–3 | 2–1 | — |
| Glenavon | 0–1 | 1–1 | 1–2 | 3–3 | 3–1 | 1–1 | — | 0–3 | 0–0 | 0–3 | 2–2 | 2–1 | — | 2–1 | 3–1 | 0–1 | 0–1 | — | — | — | 0–1 | — | — | 2–0 |
| Glentoran | 1–0 | 1–1 | 1–0 | 0–0 | 0–1 | 2–0 | 0–0 | — | 0–2 | 1–0 | 2–0 | 0–2 | — | — | — | — | 0–1 | 1–0 | 3–3 | — | 2–2 | 0–0 | — | — |
| Larne | 0–1 | 0–0 | 1–1 | 2–1 | 1–1 | 0–3 | 1–1 | 2–0 | — | 0–1 | 2–0 | 1–1 | 2–1 | — | 2–0 | 1–1 | 0–1 | 0–1 | — | — | — | — | — | — |
| Linfield | 2–0 | 1–0 | 1–2 | 3–0 | 2–1 | 3–1 | 1–0 | 1–3 | 0–1 | — | 5–1 | 2–1 | — | 3–0 | 2–1 | 0–2 | — | — | 2–0 | — | 1–0 | — | 1–0 | — |
| Loughgall | 2–3 | 3–0 | 1–5 | 0–4 | 0–4 | 0–2 | 3–0 | 2–2 | 1–4 | 1–3 | — | 2–2 | 2–1 | — | — | 1–3 | — | — | 0–2 | 1–2 | 0–1 | — | — | 0–1 |
| Portadown | 0–1 | 1–1 | 2–0 | 2–2 | 1–0 | 2–1 | 1–0 | 1–2 | 2–1 | 2–2 | 1–0 | — | — | 1–0 | — | — | — | 1–1 | — | 0–2 | 2–0 | 1–3 | — | — |

Source: Northern Ireland Football League
Legend: Blue = home team win; Yellow = draw; Red = away team win.
For upcoming matches, an "a" indicates there is an article about the rivalry between the two participants.

== Matches 34–38 ==
For the final five matches, the table splits into two halves, with the top six teams forming Section A and the bottom six teams forming Section B. Each team plays every other team in their respective section once. The fixtures are reversed from those played during rounds 23–33, ensuring that teams have played every other team in their respective section twice at home and twice away overall throughout the season.

=== Section A ===
==== League table ====
| Pos | Team | Pld | W | D | L | GF | GA | GD | Pts | Qualification |
|---|---|---|---|---|---|---|---|---|---|---|
| 1 | Linfield (C) | 38 | 27 | 4 | 7 | 69 | 28 | +41 | 85 | Qualification for the Champions League first qualifying round |
| 2 | Larne | 38 | 17 | 12 | 9 | 46 | 33 | +13 | 63 | Qualification for the Conference League first qualifying round |
| 3 | Glentoran | 38 | 17 | 10 | 11 | 49 | 37 | +12 | 61 | Qualification for the Conference League first qualifying round play-off |
| 4 | Dungannon Swifts | 38 | 17 | 6 | 15 | 51 | 48 | +3 | 57 | Qualification for the Conference League second qualifying round (Note: Dungannon Swifts qualified for the Conference League second qualifying round by winning the 2024–25 Irish Cup.) |
| 5 | Coleraine | 38 | 15 | 10 | 13 | 55 | 50 | +5 | 55 | Qualification for the Conference League first qualifying round play-off |
| 6 | Crusaders | 38 | 16 | 6 | 16 | 47 | 53 | −6 | 54 | Qualification for the Conference League first qualifying round play-off |

Source: Northern Ireland Football League
Rules for classification: 1) Points; 2) Goal difference; 3) Number of goals scored; 4) Head-to-head points; 5) Head-to-head goal difference; 6) Drawing of lots
(C) Champions

==== Results ====
Each team plays each other once (either at home or away).

| Home \ Away | COL | CRU | DUN | GLT | LAR | LIN |
|---|---|---|---|---|---|---|
| Coleraine | — | — | 3–2 | — | 1–2 | 1–0 |
| Crusaders | 3–0 | — | — | 0–4 | 2–2 | — |
| Dungannon Swifts | — | 1–0 | — | 3–2 | 1–1 | — |
| Glentoran | 2–1 | — | — | — | — | — |
| Larne | — | — | — | 0–0 | — | 2–1 |
| Linfield | — | 3–1 | 2–0 | 2–1 | — | — |

Source: Northern Ireland Football League
Legend: Blue = home team win; Yellow = draw; Red = away team win.
For upcoming matches, an "a" indicates there is an article about the rivalry between the two participants.

=== Section B ===
==== League table ====
| Pos | Team | Pld | W | D | L | GF | GA | GD | Pts | Qualification or relegation |
|---|---|---|---|---|---|---|---|---|---|---|
| 7 | Cliftonville (O) | 38 | 17 | 7 | 14 | 58 | 41 | +17 | 58 | Qualification for the Conference League first qualifying round play-off |
| 8 | Portadown | 38 | 16 | 8 | 14 | 48 | 45 | +3 | 56 | |
| 9 | Ballymena United | 38 | 14 | 5 | 19 | 47 | 54 | −7 | 47 | |
| 10 | Glenavon | 38 | 12 | 10 | 16 | 42 | 47 | −5 | 46 | |
| 11 | Carrick Rangers (O) | 38 | 7 | 11 | 20 | 32 | 59 | −27 | 32 | Qualification for the NIFL Premiership play-off |
| 12 | Loughgall (R) | 38 | 5 | 7 | 26 | 36 | 85 | −49 | 22 | Relegation to the NIFL Championship |

Source: Northern Ireland Football League
Rules for classification: 1) Points; 2) Goal difference; 3) Number of goals scored; 4) Head-to-head points; 5) Head-to-head goal difference; 6) Drawing of lots
(O) Play-off winners; (R) Relegated

==== Results ====
Each team plays each other once (either at home or away).

| Home \ Away | BYM | CRK | CLF | GLA | LGL | POR |
|---|---|---|---|---|---|---|
| Ballymena United | — | 1–1 | — | — | 5–2 | — |
| Carrick Rangers | — | — | 1–3 | 0–4 | — | 4–1 |
| Cliftonville | 5–0 | — | — | 2–0 | — | — |
| Glenavon | 2–0 | — | — | — | 0–1 | — |
| Loughgall | — | 2–2 | 1–4 | — | — | — |
| Portadown | 2–1 | — | 2–0 | 1–1 | 3–1 | — |

Source: Northern Ireland Football League
Legend: Blue = home team win; Yellow = draw; Red = away team win.
For upcoming matches, an "a" indicates there is an article about the rivalry between the two participants.

== Play-offs ==
=== Conference League play-off ===
Teams placed 3rd–7th qualified for one-off play-off matches, with the winners earning the second spot in the 2025–26 UEFA Conference League first qualifying round; the higher-placed team per game received home advantage. Teams finishing 4th-7th qualified for the quarter-finals; the 3rd-placed team qualified for the final.

Since the 2024–25 Irish Cup winners (Dungannon Swifts) finished in the top seven (4th), the spot and the quarter-finals were vacated.

==== Semi-finals ====
| 7 May 2025 | Glentoran (3rd) | 0–2 | Cliftonville (7th) | Belfast |
| 19:45 | | | Keaney 87'; McWoods 90+3' | Stadium: The Oval |

| 7 May 2025 | Coleraine (5th) | 1–0 | Crusaders (6th) | Coleraine |
| 19:45 | McManus 3' | | | Stadium: The Showgrounds |

==== Final ====
| 11 May 2025 | Coleraine (5th) | 0–2 | Cliftonville (7th) | Coleraine |
| 14:00 | | | Hale 31'; Piesold 67' | Stadium: The Showgrounds |

=== NIFL Premiership play-off ===
The eleventh-placed club (Carrick Rangers) faced the second-placed club from the 2024–25 NIFL Championship (Annagh United) in a two-legged play-off for the final place in the 2025–26 NIFL Premiership.

==== First leg ====
| 29 April 2025 | Annagh United | 2–5 | Carrick Rangers | Portadown |
| 19:45 | Upton 49'; Taylor 90+6' | | Gibson 11', 30', 40'; Heatley 17', 59' | Stadium: BMG Arena |

==== Second leg ====
| 2 May 2025 | Carrick Rangers | 3–1 (8–3 agg.) | Annagh United | Carrickfergus |
| 19:45 | Heatley 15', 84'; Gibson 52' | | Convie 41' | Stadium: Loughview Leisure Arena |

== Awards ==
| Award | Winner | Club |
|---|---|---|
| Sports Direct Player of the Year | (Northern Ireland) Joel Cooper | Linfield |
| Belleek Manager of the Year | (Northern Ireland) Rodney McAree | Dungannon Swifts |
| NIFWA Young Player of the Year | (Republic of Ireland) Matthew Orr | Linfield |

NIFWA Team of the Year
| Goalkeeper | (Hungary) Daniel Gyollai (Glentoran) | | | |
| Defence | (Republic of Ireland) Matthew Orr (Linfield) | (England) Kodi Lyons-Foster (Glentoran) | (England) Euan East (Linfield) | (Northern Ireland) Adam Glenny (Dungannon Swifts) |
| Midfield | (Burundi) Gael Bigirimana (Dungannon Swifts) | | (Northern Ireland) Fuad Sule (Glentoran) | (Northern Ireland) Rory Hale (Cliftonville) |
| Attack | (Northern Ireland) Joel Cooper (Linfield) | | (Northern Ireland) Joe Gormley (Cliftonville) | (Northern Ireland) Matthew Fitzpatrick (Linfield) |

== Attendances ==
| # | Club | Average |
|---|---|---|
| 1 | Linfield | 2,775 |
| 2 | Glentoran | 2,591 |
| 3 | Coleraine | 2,367 |
| 4 | Cliftonville | 1,696 |
| 5 | Larne | 1,599 |
| 6 | Ballymena | 1,544 |
| 7 | Crusaders | 1,523 |
| 8 | Portadown | 1,339 |
| 9 | Glenavon | 1,029 |
| 10 | Dungannon Swifts | 793 |
| 11 | Carrick Rangers | 592 |
| 12 | Loughgall | 584 |
