= 2026–27 NIFL Premiership =

Season of Irish football

NIFL Premiership
- Season: 2026–27
- Dates: 7 August 2026 – 24 April 2027
- Matches: 99
- Goals: 283 (2.86 per match)
- Top goalscorer: Matthew Shevlin (10 goals)
- Biggest home win: Cliftonville 7–1 Carrick Rangers (31 October 2026)
- Biggest away win: Crusaders 0–5 Coleraine (24 October 2026)
- Highest scoring: Cliftonville 7–1 Carrick Rangers (31 October 2026)
- All statistics correct as of 21 November 2026.

The 2026–27 NIFL Premiership (known as the Boyle Sports Premiership for sponsorship reasons) is the 19th season of the NIFL Premiership, the highest level of league football in Northern Ireland and the 126th season of Irish League football overall.

== Teams ==
The league consists of twelve teams: the top eleven teams from the previous season, and one team promoted from the NIFL Championship. Larne entered the season as defending champions, their third championship.

The promoted team was the 2025–26 NIFL Championship champions Limavady United (who returned to the top flight for the first time since 2008). They replaced the 2025–26 NIFL Premiership bottom-placed team Glenavon (relegated after 21 years in the top flight).

=== Stadia and locations ===
Locations of the 2026–27 NIFL Premiership teams
Locations of the Belfast-based 2026–27 NIFL Premiership teams

Club	Stadium	Location	Capacity
Ballymena United	The Showgrounds	Ballymena	3,824 (all seated)
Bangor	Clandeboye Park	Bangor	1,895 (500 seated)
Carrick Rangers	Loughshore Hotel Arena	Carrickfergus	2,100 (380 seated)
Cliftonville	Solitude	Belfast	3,054 (all seated)
Coleraine	The Showgrounds	Coleraine	4,843 (1,607 seated)
Crusaders	Seaview	Belfast	3,208 (all seated)
Dungannon Swifts	Stangmore Park	Dungannon	2,000 (300 seated)
Glentoran	The Oval	Belfast	6,054 (3,991 seated)
Larne	Inver Park	Larne	2,732 (1,632 seated)
Limavady United	The Showgrounds	Limavady	1,500 (274 seated)
Linfield	Windsor Park	Belfast	18,434 (all seated)
Portadown	Shamrock Park	Portadown	3,940 (2,765 seated)

=== Personnel and sponsoring ===
Team	Manager	Captain	Kit manufacturer	Shirt sponsor (front)
Ballymena United	(Northern Ireland) Oran Kearney	(Northern Ireland) Matthew Clarke	Playr-Fit	Wrightbus
Bangor	(Northern Ireland) Lee Feeney	(Northern Ireland) Lewis Harrison	Macron	bailieproperty.com
Carrick Rangers	(Northern Ireland) Stephen Baxter	(Northern Ireland) Luke McCullough	Puma	Hankook
Cliftonville	(Northern Ireland) Jim Magilton	(Republic of Ireland) Rory Hale	O'Neills	Sean Graham
Coleraine	(Northern Ireland) Ruaidhrí Higgins	(Northern Ireland) Lyndon Kane	Macron	Fibrus
Crusaders	(Northern Ireland) Declan Caddell	(Scotland) Adam Brooks	Adidas	BoyleSports
Dungannon Swifts	(Northern Ireland) Rodney McAree	(Burundi) Gaël Bigirimana	Uhlsport	Ten Square Hotel
Glentoran	(Scotland) Duncan Ferguson	(Northern Ireland) Marcus Kane	Macron	Bet McLean
Larne	(Northern Ireland) Gary Haveron	(Northern Ireland) Tomás Cosgrove	Nike	Pride & Pinion
Limavady United	(Northern Ireland) Paul Owens	(Northern Ireland) Stephen Lowry	Playr-Fit	Roe Valley Resort
Linfield	(Northern Ireland) David Healy	(Republic of Ireland) Chris Shields	Macron	Ready Construction
Portadown	(Northern Ireland) David Jeffrey	(Northern Ireland) Gary Thompson	Adidas	DFDS

== Regular season ==
=== League table ===
Pos	Team	Pld	W	D	L	GF	GA	GD	Pts	Qualification
1	Linfield	17	13	3	1	32	11	+21	42	Qualification for the Section A
2	Coleraine	17	13	2	2	38	17	+21	41	Qualification for the Section A
3	Larne	15	10	2	3	31	14	+17	32	Qualification for the Section A
4	Glentoran	16	7	4	5	21	15	+6	25	Qualification for the Section A
5	Cliftonville	17	8	0	9	31	23	+8	24	Qualification for the Section A
6	Dungannon Swifts	16	6	3	7	19	24	−5	21	Qualification for the Section A
7	Carrick Rangers	17	5	5	7	25	31	−6	20	Qualification for the Section B
8	Crusaders	17	6	1	10	22	34	−12	19	Qualification for the Section B
9	Limavady United	17	5	2	10	18	32	−14	17	Qualification for the Section B
10	Ballymena United	15	4	4	7	18	24	−6	16	Qualification for the Section B
11	Bangor	17	4	3	10	16	28	−12	15	Qualification for the Section B
12	Portadown	17	2	3	12	12	30	−18	9	Qualification for the Section B

Updated to match(es) played on 21 November 2026. Source: Northern Ireland Football League
Rules for classification: 1) Points; 2) Goal difference; 3) Number of goals scored; 4) Head-to-head points; 5) Head-to-head goal difference; 6) Drawing of lots

=== Results ===
For matches 1–22, each team plays every other team twice (home and away). For matches 23–33, each team plays every other team for the third time (either at home or away).

Home \ Away	BAL	BAN	CRK	CLF	COL	CRU	DUN	GLT	LAR	LIM	LIN	POR
Ballymena United	—	0–1	1–1			2–1		0–2			0–3	2–0
Ballymena United	—		—		—	—	—		—	—		
Bangor	2–2	—	0–4	0–3	2–3	1–0	0–0		1–2			3–1
Bangor	—	—		—	—	—		—			—	
Carrick Rangers			—	1–3	0–2	4–0		0–0	2–5	1–1	2–2	1–0
Carrick Rangers		—	—	—	1–3	1–1	—			—	—	—
Cliftonville	0–1		7–1	—		2–1	0–2	1–2	4–2			3–1
Cliftonville	—			—	—	—		3–2	—	—	—	1–2
Coleraine	3–2			1–0	—	4–1		1–1	0–0	1–0	1–3	3–0
Coleraine			—		—		—		—	—	—	
Crusaders	2–1	2–1		a	0–5	—	3–0		0–3	1–2		3–2
Crusaders			—	a	—	—		—	—	—		
Dungannon Swifts	1–1	2–0	2–4	1–3	1–3	3–1	—			3–2	0–1	
Dungannon Swifts		—		—		—	—	—	—			—
Glentoran		1–1	2–0		1–2	1–2	2–0	—		2–0	a	
Glentoran	—	2–1	—	—	—			—		1–0	a	—
Larne	4–0	1–0		2–0	2–3		3–0	2–1	—	1–1	1–2	1–0
Larne		—	—					—	—		—	—
Limavady United	3–2	3–1	1–2	1–0		0–2				—	0–2	
Limavady United		—		2–1		1–4	—	—	—	—		—
Linfield	0–3	2–0	1–0	1–0	3–0	1–0	1–1	2–1		5–0	—	
Linfield	—					—	—	—		—	—	—
Portadown	1–1	0–2			0–3		0–1	0–0	0–2	3–1	1–1	—
Portadown	—	—		—	—	—					1–2	—

Updated to match(es) played on 21 November 2026. Source: Northern Ireland Football League
Legend: Blue = home team win; Yellow = draw; Red = away team win.
For upcoming matches, an "a" indicates there is an article about the rivalry between the two participants.

== Matches 34–38 ==
For the final five matches, the table splits into two halves, with the top six teams forming Section A and the bottom six teams forming Section B. Each team plays every other team in their respective section once. The fixtures are reversed from those played during rounds 23–33, ensuring that teams have played every other team in their respective section twice at home and twice away overall throughout the season.
