= Rondinella Marzocco SSD =

Italian football club

Rondinella
- Full name: Rondinella Marzocco srl Società Sportiva Dilettantistica
- Founded: 1946; 2009 (refounded)
- Ground: Comunale Bozzi-Due Strade, Florence, Italy
- Capacity: 4,800
- Chairman: Paolo Bosi
- Manager: Stefano Tronconi
- League: Serie D
- 2025–26: Eccellenza Tuscany Group B, 1st (promoted)
| Home colours | Away colours |

Rondinella Marzocco Società Sportiva Dilettantistica (usually known simply as Rondinella) is an Italian association football club based in Florence (Italy).

== History ==
=== Rondinella Firenze ===
Founded in 1946 as Rondinella Firenze in a restaurant in the San Frediano district of Florence, the club developed a local following and came to be regarded as an alternative to the city's more prominent club, Fiorentina or la Viola as they are known in the Tuscan capital.

In 1953 the municipal administration assigned the Torrino di Santa Rosa as its registered office to Rondinella, a medieval stone building on the banks of the Arno, almost a monument to Florence.

The first president was Luigi Mochi, but among the founders there was also Brunetto Vannacci, who later became president himself and who still acts as honorary president.

By 1953 the club had progressed to the Promozione division, but 'i rossoneri' still hadn't established a permanent home ground.

1957 brought about a further promotion into Serie D, which saw them face some of the best-known Tuscan teams for the first time, such as Empoli, Pisa and U.S. Pistoiese.

In 1963 they merged with Marzocco, assuming the name of Rondinella Marzocco Firenze or R.M. Firenze. They kept the name until 1997, when Rondinella merged with Impruneta Calcio, another semi-professional soccer team in Florence, and thus became known as Rondinella Impruneta.

In 1979, Rondinella Marzocco Firenze finally established a permanent residence, moving into the Stadio Comunale delle Due Strade, where they continued to play to this day.

In the 1981–82 season, the team achieved promotion to Serie C1. Following relegation in the 1985- 86 season, the team from Florence became a yo-yo team, bouncing between Serie C2, Serie D and Eccelenza, during which time it saw mergers and club name changes.

Firstly in the early 1990s, brought about second merger, this time with Sports Association Impruneta Tavarnuzze, also leading to renaming the club to Rondinella Impruneta 1990.

After a little over 15 years in Serie C2 (last appearance in 2002), Serie D, and Eccellenza, the Florentine club found itself back in Promozione after two consecutive relegations from Serie D and Eccellenza at the start of the 2007–2008 season. At that time, the club reverted its name to Rondinella Calcio Firenze.

In May 2009, Rondinella Calcio SRL, the club's holding/ownership company, started bankruptcy proceedings due to high debt exposure, and, after three seasons in the Tuscany Promozione Division, on 24 July 2012 the company was declared bankrupt.

A week later, thanks to a group of supporters belonging to the "Vecchia Guardia" (Old Guards) and the group World of Florentine Football, a phoenix club was born - named Vecchia Guardia Rondinella Marzocco. Restarting the 2012–2013 season from the third tier of the provincial leagues of the Third Category, which resulted in a promotion.

Anyone who may wonder about the origins of the name "Rondinella" will be pleasantly surprised by this anecdote. The founders, in fact, did not know which name to give to the team. On the walls of the bar in which the club was formed, as a probable residue of a carnival party, some paper swallows were still glued; thus the idea of adopting the name Rondinella was born. The name Rondinella comes from the Italian word rondine (swallow), and their logo represents this.

Rondinella is affiliated with the Ponte a Greve youth academy, a local association that encourages sports participation.

== Notable former players ==
- (Italy) Andrea Barzagli
- (Italy) Sebastiano Rossi
- (Italy) Francesco Tavano
- (Italy) Filippo Giovagnoli

== Honours ==
- Coppa Italia Dilettanti
  - Winners: 1966–67
