= Donegall Square =

Public square in central Belfast, Northern Ireland

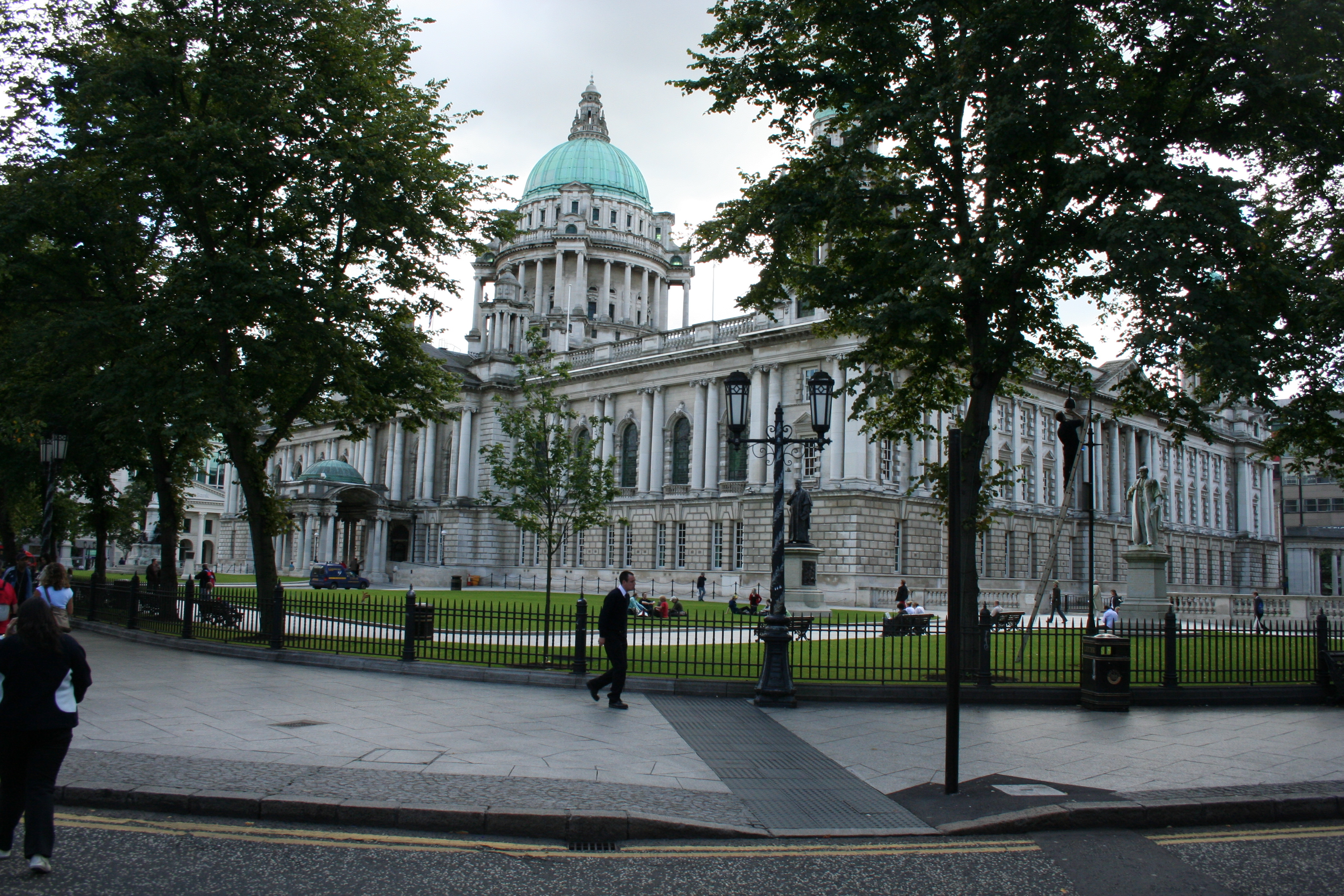
- Belfast City Hall in Donegall Square

- Location within Greater Belfast
- Namesake: Donegall family
- Maintained by: Belfast City Council
- Coordinates: 54°35′47.3″N 5°55′48.2″W
- North: A1 eastbound; Donegall Square North
- East: Donegall Square East
- South: A1 westbound; Donegall Square South
- West: Donegall Square West

Other
- Website: www.belfastcity.gov.uk/Things-to-Do/Parks-and-Open-Spaces/A-Z-Parks/Belfast-City-Hall-grounds

Donegall Square is a square in the centre of Belfast, Northern Ireland. At its centre is Belfast City Hall, the headquarters of Belfast City Council.

== Name ==
Each side of the square is named according to its geographical location, i.e. Donegall Square North, South, East and West. It is named after the Donegall family. Other streets to bear their name in Belfast are Donegall Road, Donegall Pass and Donegall Street. Donegall Place, the city's main shopping street, runs from the north side of the square.

== History ==
The square was an exclusive residential area prior to the commercial expansion of the city.

== Notable buildings and businesses ==
Notable buildings on the square include the Linen Hall Library and the Scottish Provident Building, now a five-star serviced office formally used as the head quarters of the united Irish Men. The Ten Square Hotel on Donegall Square South was originally a Victorian linen warehouse. Its exterior features carved portholes, with the faces of George Washington, Sir Isaac Newton, Michelangelo and William Shakespeare protruding.

On the square are many bank and society branches, including HSBC, Nationwide, Irish Nationwide, Santander, Bank of Scotland, Halifax, Co-operative Bank, First Trust Bank, Bank of Ireland, Danske Bank and Ulster Bank. Many of the above have their Northern Ireland headquarters on the square. The Northern Bank robbery occurred at the bank's headquarters on Donegall Square West. In addition, it is home to many law firms, including Millar McCall & Wylie, Sullivans, Rice & Company, McGriggors LLP, and Ferguson Solicitors.
