= Filippo Giovagnoli =

Italian football

Personal information
- Date of birth: 1 December 1970 (age 55)
- Place of birth: Città di Castello, Italy
- Position: Defender

Senior career*
Years	Team	Apps	(Gls)
- Sansepolcro
- Arezzo
1999–2001	Rondinella Firenze	45	(0)

Managerial career
- 2020–2021: Dundalk
- 2022–2023: NY Braveheart SC
- * Club domestic league appearances and goals

Filippo Giovagnoli (born 1 December 1970) is an Italian former professional footballer, coach and director.

== Early life ==
Giovagnoli was born in Città di Castello but grew up in the small town of Apecchio.

== Playing career ==
Giovagnoli played professionally as a centre-back in his native Italy between 1987 and 2003, appearing for Sansepolcro and Arezzo in Serie D, and most notably in Serie C for Rondinella Firenze where he partnered future World Cup winner Andrea Barzagli in central defence. He combined playing football with studying Sports Science at the University of Urbino between 1988 and 1998.

== Coaching career ==
Giovagnoli retired from playing football in 2003 and began a coaching career in the lower echelons of Italian football, spending time as U19 coach of Serie C club Gubbio 1910 and going on to achieve a UEFA A Licence in June 2011. He began working as technical director of AC Milan Soccer Camps in Italy and the United States in 2014. He also became director of coaching at the Metropolitan Oval Academy in New York in September 2014 and gained a USSF A Licence in June 2018. Giovagnoli spent 6 years in his role at Metropolitan Oval.

=== Dundalk ===
He was appointed as interim head coach of Dundalk on 25 August 2020 until the end of the 2020 League of Ireland season. He joined the club at a time of relative crisis, with previous manager Vinny Perth being dismissed following the club's defeat to NK Celje in the first qualifying round of the 2020–21 UEFA Champions League. He indicated that his priority would be achieving success in the UEFA Europa League and he guided the club to a place in the Play-off round where they beat the Faroe Islands Premier League club KÍ 3-1. However he was not allowed to manage from the touchline during the group stage due to not possessing a UEFA Pro Licence. In December 2020, Dundalk won the 2020 FAI Cup after a 4-2 win against Shamrock Rovers in the final. A couple of days after the win, Giovagnoli was appointed head coach on a permanent basis.

In March 2021, Giovagnoli's role with Dundalk was changed from head coach to coach with Shane Keegan taking over as manager.

He left the club in April 2021, returning to Metropolitan Oval Academy. He currently serves as the club's Technical Advisor.

From July 2023 until 2025, he worked as the Technical Director of Swiss Super League club Yverdon-Sport FC.

== Managerial statistics ==
As of match played 10 December 2020

Managerial record by team and tenure
Team	From	To	Record					Ref.
Team	From	To	P	W	D	L	Win %	Ref.
Dundalk	25 August 2020	10 March 2021	22	9	4	9	40.91	
Total			22	9	4	9	40.91	

== Honours ==
=== Manager ===
Dundalk

- FAI Cup (1): 2020
