= Gary Haveron =

Northern Irish footballer (born 1981)

- Haveron with Larne in 2026

Personal information
- Date of birth: 6 March 1981 (age 45)
- Place of birth: Larne, Northern Ireland

Managerial career
- Years: Team
- 2013–2016: Carrick Rangers
- 2016–2018: Glentoran
- 2025–: Larne

Gary Haveron (born 6 March 1981) is a Northern Irish football manager and former footballer who is currently Head Coach at NIFL Premiership club Larne.

== Playing career ==
Haveron joined the youth academy of English side Wolves at the age of 16.

In 1999, he moved to Bolton Wanderers, spending two years at the Reebok Stadium before returning to Northern Ireland.

Whilst at Bolton he captained the club's reserve side and trained with many of the clubs senior players including Eiður Guðjohnsen, Dean Holdsworth, Mark Fish and Guðni Bergsson, but ultimately never made a senior appearance for The Trotters.

== Managerial career ==
On 23 September 2013, Haveron was appointed as manager of Carrick Rangers. During the 2014-15 season, he led the club to a treble, winning the NIFL Championship, the Steel & Sons Cup, and the Irish Intermediate Cup. In the 2015-16 season, Haveron guided Carrick Rangers to a 10th-place finish in the NIFL Premiership, avoiding relegation having started the final matchday bottom of the table. On 23 May 2016, Haveron resigned from his position as manager.

On 28 September 2016, Haveron was appointed as manager of Glentoran following the resignation of Alan Kernaghan. On 21 February 2018, Haveron was sacked after a 2-1 defeat at home to Ards, after which a section of Glentoran supporters staged a protest calling for the board to go.

In June 2019 Haveron took up the role of Academy Director at Larne, before being appointed on a full-time basis in July 2020. In April 2023, Haveron was promoted to Tiernan Lynch’s backroom staff with the club's first team. On 18 November 2024, Haveron was appointed as interim manager of Larne after Tiernan Lynch left the club to join Derry City, managing the club for a 1-0 defeat against NK Olimpija Ljubljana in the UEFA Europa Conference League. After the appointment of Nathan Rooney as Larne manager, Haveron was promoted to the role of assistant manager. After Rooney’s abrupt departure in August 2025, Haveron resumed his role of interim manager before being given the job on a permanent basis in October 2025 on a 3 year contract.

== Style of play ==
Haveron mainly operated as a defender. He was known for his "distribution under pressure".

== Personal life ==
Haveron is a native of Larne, Northern Ireland. He has a son called Alfie who made his debut for Larne F.C. in 2025 aged just 15.

== Managerial statistics ==
As of match played 21 November 2026

Managerial record by team and tenure
Team	Nat	From	To	Record							
Team	Nat	From	To	G	W	D	L	GF	GA	GD	Win %
Larne	(Northern Ireland)	20 November 2024	25 May 2025	31	12	10	9	33	28	+5	38.71
Larne	(Northern Ireland)	18 August 2025	present	72	44	14	14	130	65	+65	61.11
Total				103	56	24	23	163	93	+70	54.37

== Honours ==
Larne

- NIFL Premiership 2025-26
- NIFL Charity Shield: 2026

Individual

- NIFL Manager of the Year 2025-26
- Ulster Footballer of the Year- Manager of the Year 2025-26
- NIFWA Manager of the Year 2025-26
