= Matthew Orr =

Matthew Orr may refer to:

- Matthew Orr (footballer), a Northern Irish footballer
- Matthew Orr (businessman), a British investor and start-up advisor
- Matt Orr, a Hong Kong professional footballer
