= Tiernan Lynch =

Irish football manager

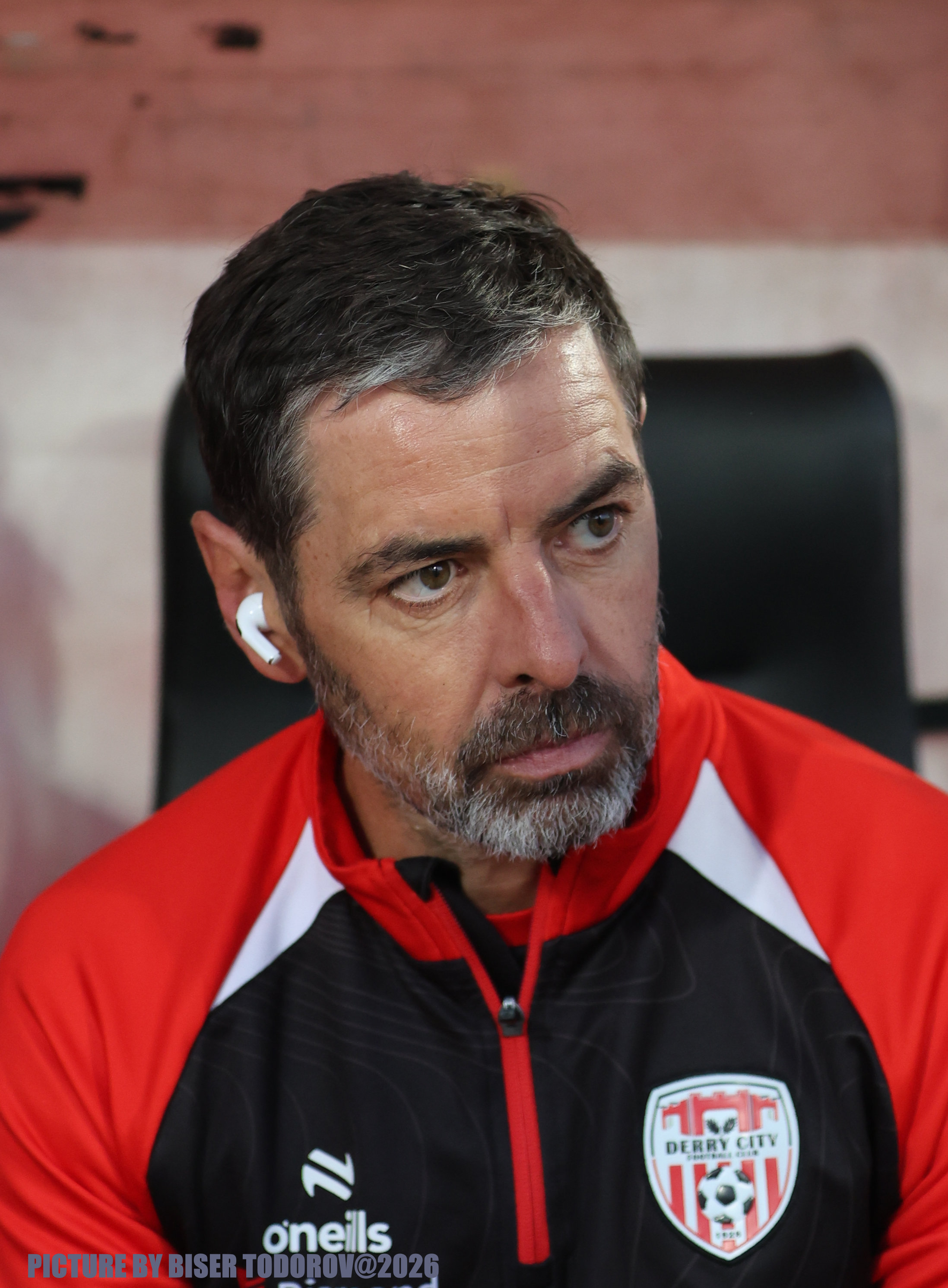

Personal information
- Date of birth: 19 February 1976 (age 50)
- Place of birth: Belfast, Northern Ireland

Managerial career
- Years: Team
- 2017–2024: Larne
- 2024–2026: Derry City

Tiernan Lynch (born 19 February 1976) is a Northern Irish football manager who previously managed Larne and Derry City.

== Early life and playing career ==
Lynch is the son of Irish republican and former politician, Seamus Lynch. He grew up in the New Lodge area of north Belfast. He played for Somerton in his youth. His family later moved to the Whitewell area of the city and he soon joined youth football club Star of the Sea. He played for Newington for a couple of seasons under youth coach Marty Morgan before joining Cliftonville when he was 16. Lynch initially played for the club's under-18 side and then the reserves, before joining Irish League First Division side Carrick Rangers on loan for the 1997–98 season.

== Coaching career ==
=== Long Island University ===
Lynch subsequently attended Long Island University in New York on a soccer scholarship. He achieved his coaching qualifications whilst in the U.S. and felt that his time there highlighted a different approach to coaching than what he had been used to, focusing more on the technical side as opposed to physicality.

=== Return to Ireland ===
Lynch returned home after 3 years and assisted his brother, Seamus, with coaching Cliftonville's U18s between 2005 and 2011. His time in the U.S. had made him realise there was a gap in the market back home for blending education and football skills development. Belfast Metropolitan College embraced the idea and developed Northern Ireland's first full-time football academy with the Lynch brothers in charge. The academy has been involved in the development of professional players such as Jordan Stewart, Joel Cooper, Jay Donnelly and Gavin Whyte.

== Managerial career ==
=== Irish League ===
Lynch served as assistant manager at Glentoran between 2012 and 2016, first under Eddie Patterson, then Alan Kernaghan, and later Roy Coyle and Gary Haveron. He was appointed first-team manager at Larne in 2017. In his second season in charge Lynch won the NIFL Championship following a 22-game unbeaten run, earning Larne a place in the NIFL Premiership for the first time since relegation in 2008. Subsequent qualification for the 2021–22 Europa Conference League brought the first games in European competition for both Lynch and Larne. They eliminated Bala Town and AGF Aarhus before being defeated by Paços de Ferreira. Lynch managed Larne to their first-ever NIFL Premiership in 2022–23, and they defended their title the following season. In 2024–25 Lynch became the first manager of an Irish League team to qualify for the group stage of European competition, competing in the League Phase of the Conference League. He was approached by Scottish Premier League club St. Johnstone to take over as their first-team manager however he was unable to agree personal terms and declined the offer.

=== Derry City ===
He was subsequently approached by Derry City and was named as their manager on 18 November 2024, signing a three-year contract. Lynch guided the team to a second place finish in the League of Ireland Premier Division in his first season. On 5 August 2026, Lynch was sacked by Derry City after losing all 4 of their European fixtures and sitting in 6th place on the league table, 21 points off the top of the league.

== Managerial statistics ==
As of match played on 2 August 2026

Managerial record by team and tenure
Team	From	To	Record								Ref.
Team	From	To	P	W	D	L	GF	GA	GD	Win %	Ref.
Larne	1 July 2017	19 November 2024	297	167	62	68	564	300	+264	56.23	
Derry City	20 November 2024	5 August 2026	70	27	22	21	98	80	+18	38.57	
Total			367	194	84	89	662	380	+282	52.86	

== Honours ==
Larne

- NIFL Premiership: 2
  - 2022–23, 2023–24
- County Antrim Shield: 4
  - 2020–21, 2021–22, 2022–23, 2023–24
- NIFL Championship: 1
  - 2018–19
- NIFL Charity Shield: 1
  - 2024

Derry City

- President of Ireland's Cup: 1
  - 2026

Individual

- NIFWA Manager of the Year: 2022–23
