= Stefan Čolović (Serbian footballer) =

Serbian footballer

Personal information
- Full name: Stefan Čolović
- Date of birth: 16 April 1994 (age 32)
- Place of birth: Belgrade, FR Yugoslavia
- Height: 1.75 m (5 ft 9 in)
- Position: Winger

Team information
- Current team: Nasaf
- Number: 19

Youth career
- Red Star Belgrade
- Rad
- Atlético Madrid
- Partizan

Senior career*
Years	Team	Apps	(Gls)
2014	Rad	1	(0)
2014	Drina Zvornik	13	(0)
2015	Sloboda Tuzla	11	(0)
2015	Drina Zvornik	14	(0)
2016	Jagodina	1	(0)
2016	Radnički Pirot	14	(1)
2017	Kolubara	8	(3)
2017–2019	Proleter Novi Sad	82	(16)
2020	Dundalk	14	(1)
2021–2022	Čukarički	49	(5)
2022–2023	Radnički Kragujevac	39	(4)
2024	Radnički Niš	9	(0)
2024–	Nasaf	24	(2)
- * Club domestic league appearances and goals as of 10 August 2025

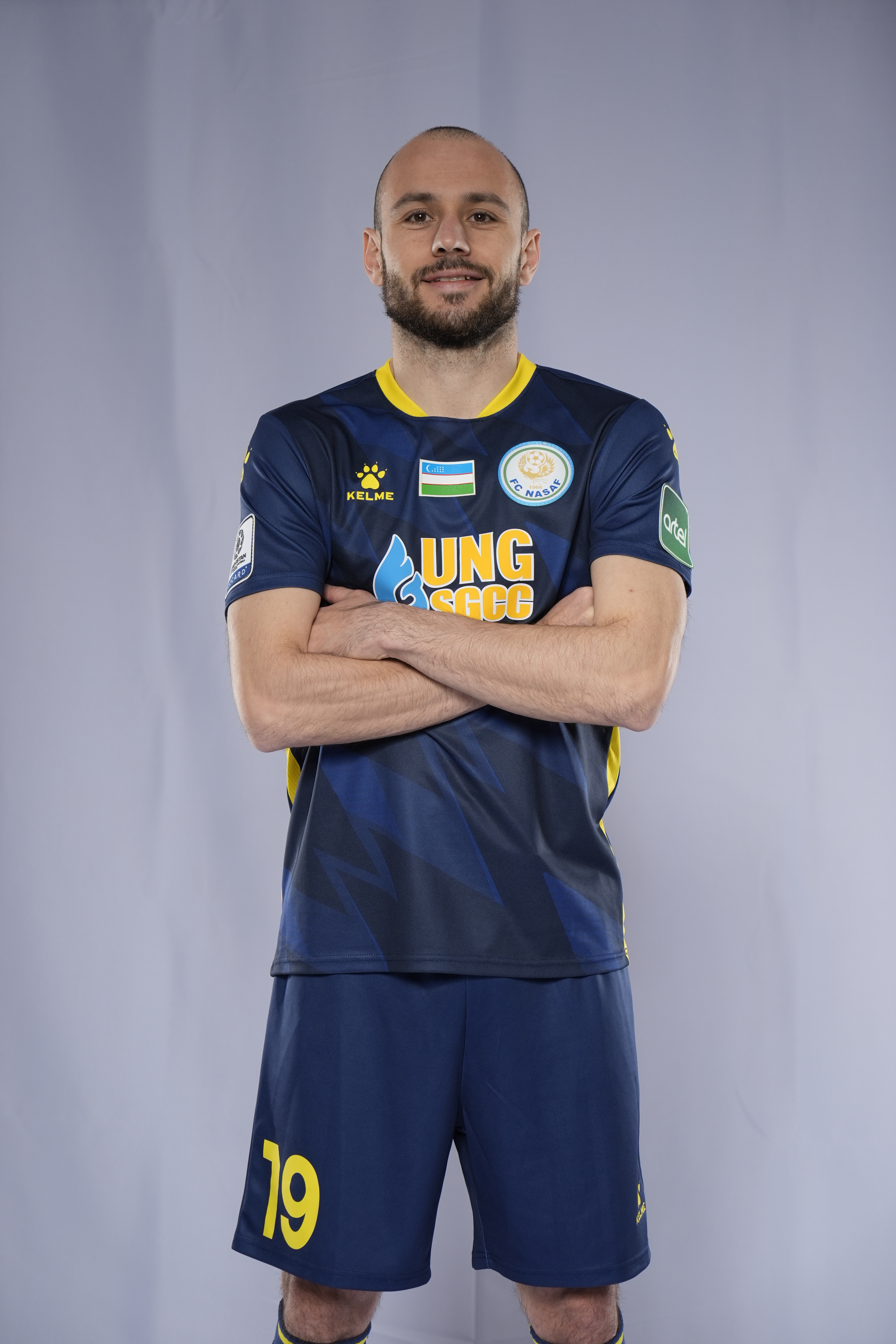

Stefan Čolović (Serbian Cyrillic: Стефан Чоловић; born 16 April 1994) is a Serbian professional footballer who plays as a midfielder for Nasaf.

== Youth career ==
He started at Red Star Belgrade, when he was 9 years old. Although, he was one of the best in his generation, he left to join Rad, where he stayed around two years. He passed through the camp of Atlético Madrid, and was playing for their youth team. After returning to Serbia, he was with young categories of Partizan.

== Professional career ==
=== Rad ===
At the beginning of 2014, he returned to Rad, signed, and joined the first team. He made his Jelen SuperLiga debut on away match versus Vojvodina on 13 April 2014.

=== Bosnian Premier League ===
After having had little chance at start-line in Rad, he decided to move, and in summer 2014 he joined Drina Zvornik playing in the Premier League of Bosnia and Herzegovina. In the first half of the season he became a regular and made 13 appearances. During the winter break he moved to another Premier League club, Sloboda Tuzla.

== Honours ==
Proleter Novi Sad

- Serbian First League: 2017–18

Dundalk

- FAI Cup: 2020

Individual

- Serbian SuperLiga Player of the Week: 2023–24 (Round 12)
