= 2020 President of Ireland's Cup =

- Event: President's Cup
Dundalk	Shamrock Rovers
- Date: Cancelled
- Venue: Oriel Park, Dundalk

The 2020 President's Cup was to be the seventh President's Cup contested for. The match was to be played between the champions of 2019 League of Ireland Premier Division and 2019 FAI Cup, Dundalk, and Shamrock Rovers. It was due to take place on 9 February 2020, at Oriel Park but was postponed due to Storm Ciara. A new date for the match was to be announced but that did not happen due to the COVID-19 pandemic.

== See also ==
- 2020 FAI Cup
- 2020 League of Ireland Premier Division
