= DoubleTree by Hilton Belfast City Ten Square =

Four-star hotel in Donegall Square South, Belfast, Northern Ireland

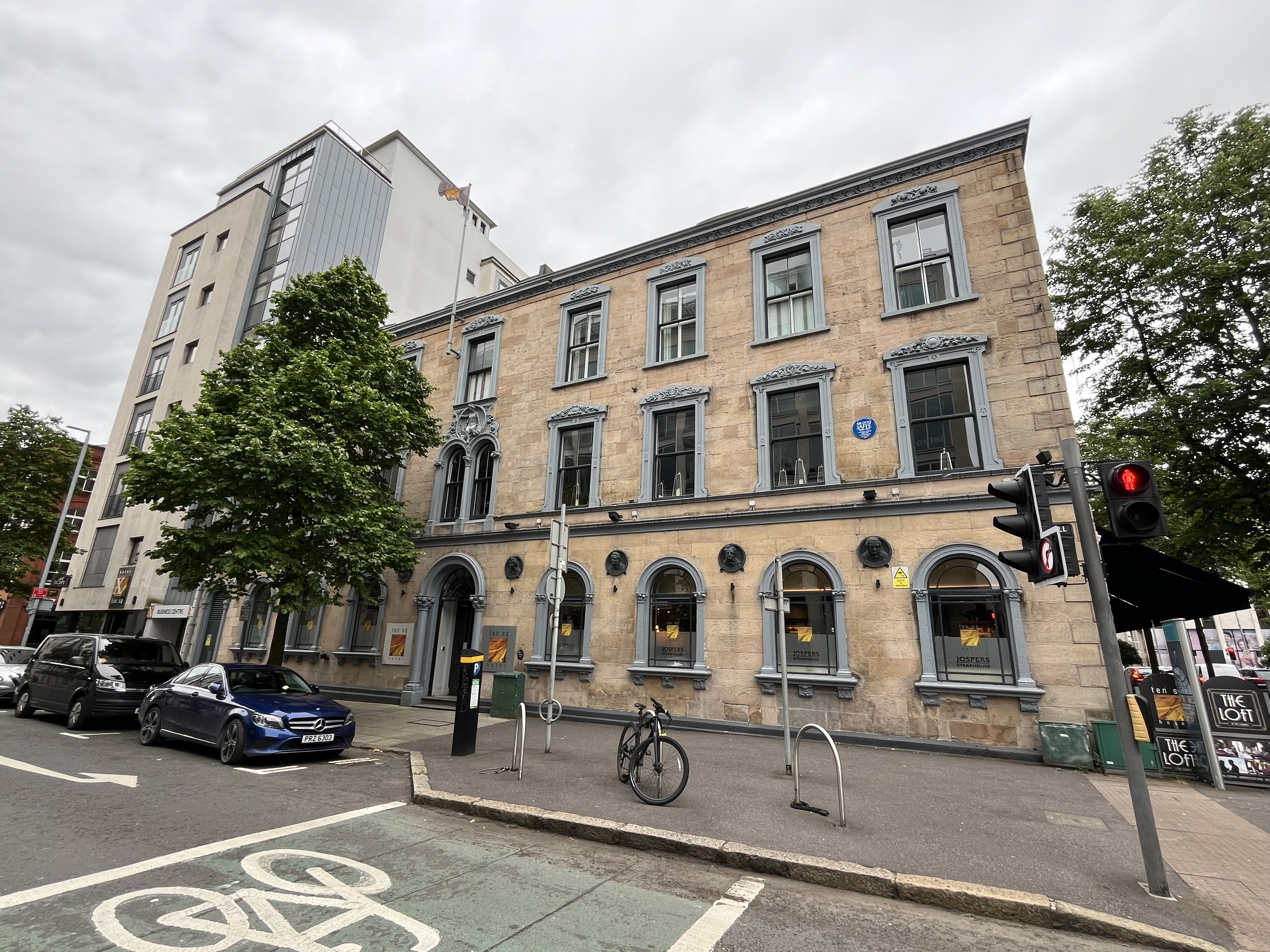
- Interactive map of the DoubleTree by Hilton Belfast City Ten Square area

General information
- Location: 10 Donegall Square South, Belfast, BT1 5JD
- Coordinates: 54.5957°N 5.93033°W
- Opening: 2000
- Owner: Hilton Worldwide

Other information
- Number of rooms: 23

Website
- https://www.hilton.com/en/hotels/bfsbfdi-doubletree-belfast-city-ten-square/

In 2025, the Ten Square Hotel entered into a franchise agreement with Hilton and was rebranded as DoubleTree by Hilton Belfast City Ten Square. The hotel, located at 10 Donegall Square South in the Linen Quarter of Belfast, underwent a renovation before joining the DoubleTree by Hilton portfolio while remaining under the ownership and management of the Loughview Leisure Group.

== Architectural significance ==
The hotel building itself occupies a notable Grade B1 listed building, once called Yorkshire House. It is the oldest extant commercial building in Donegall Square, built originally in 1862–63 as a linen warehouse for the Jaffe brothers. Its age makes it the same vintage as the Ulster Hall in nearby Bedford Street. The floral pedimented windows to the upper floors and the eccentric range of famous heads between the ground floor windows. There are 16 faces in total, with North elevation - from left, Michelangelo, Columbus, Washington, Mercury, Minerva, Shakespeare, Schiller and Homer; and East elevation - from left, Newton, Humboldt, Jacquard, Peace, Flora, Stevenson, Moore and Watt.

Sir Otto Moses Jaffe was Belfast's first and so far only Jewish Lord Mayor. Born in Hamburg on August 13, 1846, his father, Daniel Joseph Jaffe, was a merchant, who came to Belfast to set up a linen export business in 1850. The Jaffe linen memorial fountain is located on Victoria Street outside new Victoria Square. Jaffe erected the Jaffe Memorial fountain in 1874 to commemorate his father, who had funded the building of Belfast's first synagogue at Great Victoria Street.

As well as having a successful career in business, Jaffe was a prominent public figure, active in Belfast civic life. His public positions included membership of the Harbour Commission, the Senate of Queen's College, which later became Queen's University and the board of Governors of the Royal Hospital. Elected to the town council in 1894, he was Lord Mayor in 1899 and 1904.

He set up Jaffe Public Elementary School at the corner of both the Cliftonville and Antrim Roads in 1907. However, Jaffe's philanthropy was poorly rewarded during the First World War when a group of Belfast ladies refused to support the Children's Hospital if ‘the Germans’, Jaffe and his wife, remained on the board.

Previous to the current building, it is said the ground was once a row of Georgian houses where the famous physician, poet, educationalist, and radical democrat Dr William Drennan lived in the early 1800s (whose sister had already founded the Maternity Hospital on the city square several years before, and which was the forerunner of the current Royal Maternity Hospital).

== History ==
The hotel was officially opened in 2000. In 2008, the hotel was purchased by millionaire property developer John Miskelly (famous for his £250 million takeover attempt of Liverpool Football Club) for an undisclosed sum from the County Antrim-based Hill family, owners of the Galgorm Manor Hotel.

The hotel has also hosted several notable events such as The Miss Belfast final in 2010, film and cinema events and city council dinners and other local government functions.

== Features ==
The hotel consists of 135 rooms across seven floors. These comprise boutique guest bedrooms across two floors in the landmark Grade B1 Listed Yorkshire House building, plus offering a further 48 ‘Signature rooms’ in the recent contemporary extension, completed in December 2016. It also has a selection of events and conferencing facilities, most notably the Linen Suite. The hotel venue is registered for civil partnership ceremonies and markets itself as "the most LGBT friendly of all Belfast's hotels".

== Awards and hospitality links ==
The hotel has won a number of awards, most recently winning 'Best City Hotel' from the Belfast Business Awards. The hotel has been voted 'Sexiest Hotel in Belfast' by Cosmopolitan and 'Belfast's Coolest Hotel' by The Sunday Times.
