= Matthew Fitzpatrick (footballer) =

Irish footballer (born 1994)

Personal information
- Date of birth: September 2, 1994 (age 32)
- Place of birth: Belfast, Northern Ireland
- Position: Striker

Team information
- Current team: Linfield
- Number: 29

Senior career*
Years	Team	Apps	(Gls)
2013–2018	Immaculata		
2019	Belfast Celtic		
2020	Coleraine	4	(1)
2020–2023	Glenavon	109	(45)
2023–	Linfield	107	(38)
- * Club domestic league appearances and goals as of 19 April 2026

Matthew Fitzpatrick (born 1 April 1990) is a Northern Irish footballer who plays as a striker for Linfield.

== Early life ==
Fitzpatrick started playing football at an early age. He also played Gaelic football as a child. He is a native of Belfast, Northern Ireland.

== Career ==
Fitzpatrick started his career with Northern Irish side Immaculata. In 2019, he signed for Northern Irish side Belfast Celtic. In 2020, he signed for Northern Irish side Coleraine. After that, he signed for Northern Irish side Glenavon. In 2023, he signed for Northern Irish side Linfield. He suffered a thigh injury while playing for the club.
