= League of Ireland Player of the Month =

Irish football award

The League of Ireland Player of the Month is awarded monthly to the best player in the League of Ireland. The winners are selected by Soccer Writers' Ireland, commonly known as the SWI (formerly known as Soccer Writers' Association of Ireland).

== Winners ==
=== 1971–72 ===
Month	Nationality	Player	Team	Position
September	Ireland	Mick Leech	Shamrock Rovers	FW
October	Ireland	Vinny Maguire	Waterford	DF
November	Ireland	Jackie Morley	Waterford	MF
December	Northern Ireland	Terry Harkin	Finn Harps	FW
January	Ireland	Miah Dennehy	Cork Hibernians	MF
February	Ireland	Alfie Hale	Waterford	FW
March	Ireland	Turlough O'Connor	Bohemians	FW
April	Ireland	Miah Dennehy	Cork Hibernians	MF

=== 1972–73 ===
Month	Nationality	Player	Team	Position
September	Scotland	Doug Wood	Athlone Town	DF
October	Ireland	Tommy McConville	Waterford	DF
November	Ireland	Alfie Hale	Waterford	FW
December	Ireland	Fred Davis	Bohemians	GK
January	Ireland	Miah Dennehy	Cork Hibernians	MF
February	Ireland	Paul McNaughton	Shelbourne	DF
March	Ireland	Richard Brooks	Cork Celtic	DF
April	Ireland	Alfie Hale	Waterford	FW

=== 1973–74 ===
Month	Nationality	Player	Team	Position
September	Ireland	Turlough O'Connor	Bohemians	FW
October	Ireland	Terry Flanagan	Bohemians	FW
November	Ireland	Frank O'Neill	Cork Celtic	FW
December	Ireland	Donal Murphy	Shamrock Rovers	MF
January	Ireland	Johnny Fullam	Bohemians	DF
February	Ireland	Ben Hannigan	Cork Celtic	FW
March	Ireland	Charlie Ferry	Finn Harps	FW
April	N/A	No Award	N/A	N/A

=== 1974–75 ===
Month	Nationality	Player	Team	Position
September	Ireland	Donal Murphy	Shamrock Rovers	MF
October	Ireland	Mick Leech	Waterford	FW
November	Ireland	Pat Byrne	Bohemians	MF
December	Ireland	Mick Smyth	Bohemians	GK
January	Ireland	Jim Smith	Finn Harps	MF
February	Ireland	Dave Wigginton	Cork Hibernians	MF
March	Ireland	Tommy Kelly	Bohemians	MF
April	Ireland	Vincent McKenna	Shelbourne	MF

=== 1975–76 ===
Month	Nationality	Player	Team	Position
September	Ireland	Eugene Davis	Athlone Town	MF
October	Ireland	Carl Humphries	Athlone Town	FW
November	Ireland	Brendan Bradley	Finn Harps	FW
December	Ireland	Gerry Ryan	Bohemians	FW
January	England	Bobby Tambling	Cork Celtic	FW
February	Ireland	Bryan McSweeney	Cork Celtic	MF
March	Ireland	Seamus McDowell	Dundalk	MF
April	Northern Ireland	Martin Donnelly	Drogheda United	DF

=== 1976–77 ===
Month	Nationality	Player	Team	Position
September	New Zealand	Sean Byrne	St Patrick's Athletic	MF
October	Ireland	Paul McGee	Sligo Rovers	FW
November	Northern Ireland	Martin Donnelly	Drogheda United	DF
December	Ireland	Paul McGee	Sligo Rovers	FW
January	Ireland	Fran O'Brien	Bohemians	MF
February	Ireland	Ashley Grimes	Bohemians	DF
March	Ireland	Mick Lawlor	Dundalk	FW
April	Ireland	John Herrick	Limerick	MF

=== 1977–78 ===
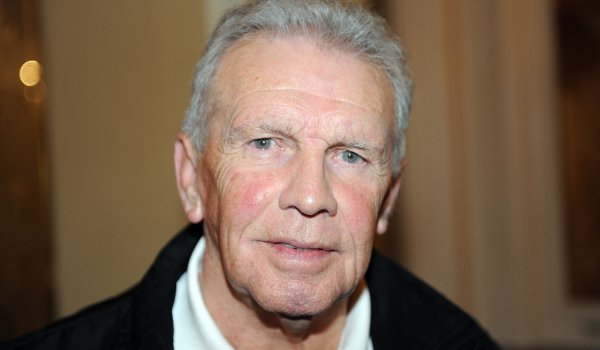
Johnny Giles, Player of the Month in March 1978.

Month	Nationality	Player	Team	Position
September	Ireland	Cathal Muckian	Drogheda United	FW
October	Ireland	Eamonn Gregg	Bohemians	DF
November	Ireland	Jim Sheridan	Finn Harps	DF
December	England	Sid Wallace	Waterford United	FW
January	England	Alex Ludzic	Cork Alberts	GK
February	Northern Ireland	Alan Patterson	Sligo Rovers	GK
March	Ireland	Johnny Giles	Shamrock Rovers	MF
April	Ireland	Eamonn Gregg	Bohemians	DF

=== 1978–79 ===
Month	Nationality	Player	Team	Position
September	Ireland	Dermot Keely	Dundalk	DF
October	Ireland	Tommy O'Brien	Cork Celtic	MF
November	N/A	Full Team	Home Farm	N/A
December	Ireland	Mick Leech	Drogheda United	FW
January	Ireland	Paddy Joyce	Bohemians	FW
February	Ireland	Derek Carthy	St Patrick's Athletic	FW
March	Ireland	Paddy Dunning	Dundalk	DF
April	New Zealand	Sean Byrne	Dundalk	MF

=== 1979–80 ===
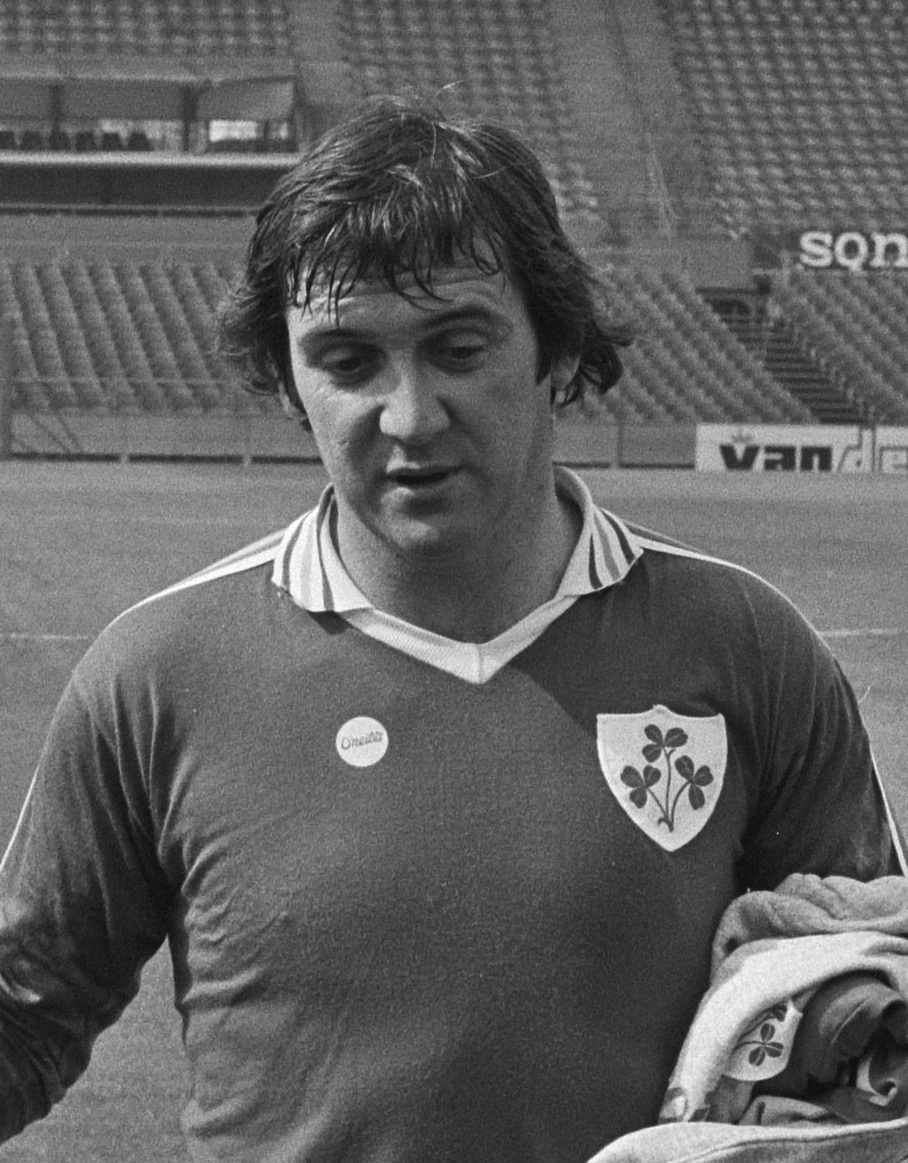
Eoin Hand, Player of the Month in September 1979.

Month	Nationality	Player	Team	Position
September	Ireland	Eoin Hand	Limerick United	DF
October	Ireland	Dermot Keely	Dundalk	DF
November	Ireland	Brendan Storan	Limerick United	DF
December	Ireland	Alan Campbell	Shamrock Rovers	FW
January	Ireland	Joe Logan	Finn Harps	MF
February	England	Richie Blackmore	Dundalk	GK
March	Ireland	Jackie Jameson	St Patrick's Athletic	FW
April	Ireland	Peter Thomas	Waterford United	GK

=== 1980–81 ===
Month	Nationality	Player	Team	Position
September	Ireland	Des Kennedy	Limerick United	FW
October	Ireland	Mick Fairclough	Dundalk	MF
November	Ireland	Michael O'Connor	Athlone Town	FW
December	Ireland	Padraig O'Connor	Athlone Town	MF
January	Ireland	Liam Keane	Cork United	MF
February	Ireland	Liam Harbison	Finn Harps	DF
March	Ireland	Tony Fagan	Sligo Rovers	MF
April	Ireland	Eugene Davis	Athlone Town	MF

=== 1981–82 ===
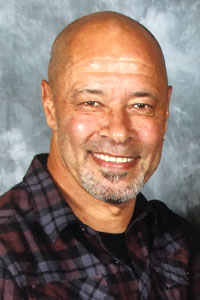
Paul McGrath, Player of the Month in March 1982.

Month	Nationality	Player	Team	Position
September	Ireland	Barry Kehoe	Dundalk	MF
October	Ireland	Jackie Jameson	Bohemians	FW
November	Ireland	David Flavin	Thurles Town	GK
December	Ireland	Liam Buckley	Shamrock Rovers	FW
January	Ireland	Jim Beglin	Shamrock Rovers	DF
February	Ireland	Mick Byrne	Shelbourne	FW
March	Ireland	Paul McGrath	St Patrick's Athletic	DF
April	Ireland	Tommy McConville	Dundalk	DF

=== 1982–83 ===
Month	Nationality	Player	Team	Position
September	Ireland	Denis Clarke	Athlone Town	FW
October	Ireland	Leo Flanagan	Dundalk	MF
November	Ireland	Noel Larkin	Athlone Town	FW
December	Ireland	Brendan Bradley	Finn Harps	FW
January	Ireland	Kieran McCabe	Shelbourne	MF
February	Ireland	Martin Murray	Drogheda United	MF
March	Ireland	Eddie O'Halloran	Cobh Ramblers	DF
April	Ireland	Barry Murphy	Bohemians	DF

=== 1983–84 ===
Month	Nationality	Player	Team	Position
September	Ireland	Larry Wyse	Athlone Town	MF
October	Ireland	Brendan Bradley	Finn Harps	FW
November	Ireland	Pat Byrne	Shamrock Rovers	MF
December	Ireland	Jackie Jameson	Bohemians	FW
January	Ireland	Alan Campbell	Shamrock Rovers	FW
February	Ireland	Liam Murphy	Limerick City	DF
March	Ireland	Mick Bennett	Waterford United	MF
April	Ireland	Jacko McDonagh	Shamrock Rovers	DF

=== 1984–85 ===
Month	Nationality	Player	Team	Position
September	Ireland	Gino Lawless	Bohemians	MF
October	Ireland	Jacko McDonagh	Shamrock Rovers	DF
November	Ireland	Mick McLoughlin	Galway United	DF
December	Ireland	Fran Hitchcock	Home Farm	FW
January	Ireland	Al Finucane	Limerick	DF
February	Ireland	Pat O'Kelly	Home Farm	DF
March	Ireland	Tommy Gaynor	Limerick	FW
April	Ireland	Denis Bonner	Galway United	MF

=== 1985–86 ===
Month	Nationality	Player	Team	Position
September	N/A	No Award	N/A	N/A
October	N/A	No Award	N/A	N/A
November	Ireland	Denis Bonner	Galway United	MF
December	Ireland	Joey Malone	Dundalk	DF
January	Ireland	Paul McGee	Galway United	FW
February	Ireland	Pat Healy	Cork City	MF
March	Ireland	Barry Murphy	Bohemians	DF
April	Ireland	Kevin Power	Waterford United	DF

=== 1986–87 ===
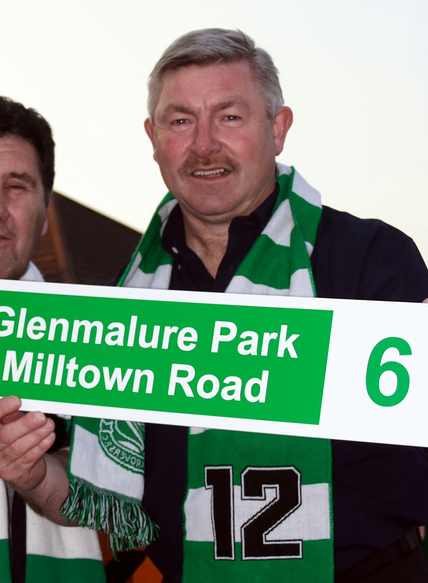
Pat Byrne, three time Player of the Month, in November of 1974 & 1983 and September 1986.

Month	Nationality	Player	Team	Position
September	Ireland	Pat Byrne	Shamrock Rovers	MF
October	Ireland	Richie Kelly	Home Farm	MF
November	Ireland	Barry Kehoe	Dundalk	MF
December	Ireland	David Flavin	Waterford United	GK
January	Ireland	Eugene Davis	Bray Wanderers	MF
February	Yugoslavia	Alex Krstić	Derry City	FW
March	Ireland	Mick Byrne	Shamrock Rovers	FW
April	Ireland	Noel Larkin	Shamrock Rovers	FW

=== 1987–88 ===
Month	Nationality	Player	Team	Position
September	Ireland	Mick Bennett	Waterford United	MF
October	Ireland	Paul McGee	Galway United	FW
November	Ireland	Mick Neville	Shamrock Rovers	DF
December	Ireland	John Reynor	Bohemians	MF
January	Ireland	Damien Byrne	St Patrick's Athletic	DF
February	Ireland	John Caulfield	Cork City	FW
March	Ireland	Terry Eviston	Dundalk	FW
April	Ireland	Dessie Gorman	Dundalk	FW

=== 1988–89 ===
Month	Nationality	Player	Team	Position
September	Northern Ireland	Billy Hamilton	Limerick City	FW
October	Ireland	Mark Ennis	St Patrick's Athletic	FW
November	Ireland	Paul Doolin	Derry City	MF
December	Ireland	Terry Kearns	Cobh Ramblers	MF
January	Ireland	Larry Wyse	Dundalk	MF
February	Ireland	Paddy Dunning	Drogheda United	DF
March	Northern Ireland	Liam Coyle	Derry City	FW
April	Ireland	Dave Barry	Cork City	MF

=== 1989–90 ===
Month	Nationality	Player	Team	Position
September	Ireland	Mark Ennis	St Patrick's Athletic	FW
October	Ireland	Mick Moody	St Patrick's Athletic	DF
November	Northern Ireland	Felix Healy	Derry City	MF
December	Ireland	Paul Doolin	Derry City	MF
January	Ireland	Conor Best	Kilkenny City	DF
February	Wales	Phil Harrington	Cork City	GK
March	Ireland	Damien Byrne	St Patrick's Athletic	DF
April	Ireland	Dave Henderson	St Patrick's Athletic	GK

=== 1990–91 ===
Month	Nationality	Player	Team	Position
September	Ireland	Paul Bannon	Cork City	FW
October	Ireland	Peter Hanrahan	Dundalk	FW
November	Ireland	Curtis Fleming	St Patrick's Athletic	DF
December	Ireland	Denis Bonner	Sligo Rovers	MF
January	Ireland	Dave Connell	Shamrock Rovers	DF
February	Ireland	Pat Morley	Cork City	FW
March	Ireland	Sean Murphy	Ashtown Villa	FW
April	Scotland	Tom McNulty	Dundalk	MF

=== 1991–92 ===
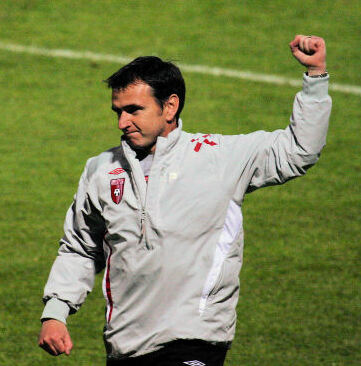
Pat Fenlon, two time Player of the Month, in April 1992 and September 1999.

Month	Nationality	Player	Team	Position
September	Ireland	Dave Barry	Cork City	MF
October	Ireland	Dermot O'Neill	Derry City	GK
November	Ireland	Paul Whelan	Bohemians	DF
December	Ireland	Robbie Best	Bohemians	DF
January	Ireland	John Caulfield	Cork City	FW
February	Ireland	Paul McGee	Sligo Rovers	FW
March	Ireland	Tony McCarthy	Shelbourne	DF
April	Ireland	Pat Fenlon	Bohemians	MF

=== 1992–93 ===
Month	Nationality	Player	Team	Position
September	Ireland	Dave Tilson	Bohemians	MF
October	Ireland	Pat Morley	Cork City	FW
November	Scotland	Gerry McCabe	Cork City	MF
December	Ireland	Ken DeMange	Limerick	MF
January	Ireland	Robbie Best	Bohemians	DF
February	Ireland	Pascal Keane	Waterford United	FW
March	England	Garry Haylock	Shelbourne	FW
April	Ireland	Anthony Whelan	Shelbourne	DF

=== 1993–94 ===
Month	Nationality	Player	Team	Position
September	Ireland	Anthony Buckley	Cork City	MF
October	Ireland	Stephen Geoghegan	Shamrock Rovers	FW
November	Ireland	Alan Byrne	Shamrock Rovers	MF
December	Northern Ireland	Peter Hutton	Derry City	DF
January	Ireland	John Brennan	Galway United	FW
February	Ireland	John Kenny	Sligo Rovers	MF
March	Ireland	Eoin Mullen	Shamrock Rovers	DF
April	Ireland	Dermot O'Neill	Derry City	GK

=== 1994–95 ===
Month	Nationality	Player	Team	Position
August	Ireland	Gavin Dykes	Sligo Rovers	DF
September	Ireland	Tony O'Connor	Bohemians	DF
October	Ireland	John McDonnell	St Patrick's Athletic	DF
November	Ireland	John Caulfield	Cork City	FW
December	England	Mike Small	Sligo Rovers	FW
January	Ireland	Jason Sherlock	UCD	FW
February	Northern Ireland	Paul Curran	Derry City	DF
March	England	Mark Rutherford	Shelbourne	MF
April	Northern Ireland	Liam Coyle	Derry City	FW

=== 1995–96 ===
Month	Nationality	Player	Team	Position
August	Ireland	Paul Doolin	Derry City	MF
September	Ireland	Gary Howlett	Shelbourne	MF
October	Ireland	Maurice O'Driscoll	Bohemians	MF
November	Ireland	Greg Costello	Shelbourne	MF
December	Ireland	Eddie Gormley	St Patrick's Athletic	MF
January	Ireland	Alan Gough	Shelbourne	GK
February	Ireland	Stephen Geoghegan	Shelbourne	FW
March	Ireland	Ricky O'Flaherty	St Patrick's Athletic	FW
April	Ireland	Dave Campbell	St Patrick's Athletic	DF

=== 1996–97 ===
Month	Nationality	Player	Team	Position
August	Ireland	Eoin Mullen	Bohemians	DF
September	Ireland	Paul Doolin	Bohemians	MF
October	Ireland	Terry Palmer	UCD	DF
November	Ireland	Patsy Freyne	Cork City	MF
December	Northern Ireland	Gary Beckett	Derry City	FW
January	Ireland	Pat Morley	Shelbourne	FW
February	Ireland	Tony Cousins	Shamrock Rovers	FW
March	Northern Ireland	Paul Curran	Derry City	DF
April	Northern Ireland	Peter Hutton	Derry City	DF

=== 1997–98 ===
Month	Nationality	Player	Team	Position
August	Ireland	Dessie Baker	Shelbourne	FW
September	Ireland	Pat Scully	Shelbourne	DF
October	Ireland	Brian Byrne	Dundalk	MF
November	Ireland	Colin Hawkins	St Patrick's Athletic	DF
December	Ireland	Ollie Cahill	Cork City	MF
January	Ireland	Matt Britton	Shamrock Rovers	MF
February	United States	Nicky Brujos	Sligo Rovers	GK
March	Ireland	Keith Doyle	St Patrick's Athletic	DF
April	Ireland	Thomas Morgan	St Patrick's Athletic	MF

=== 1998–99 ===
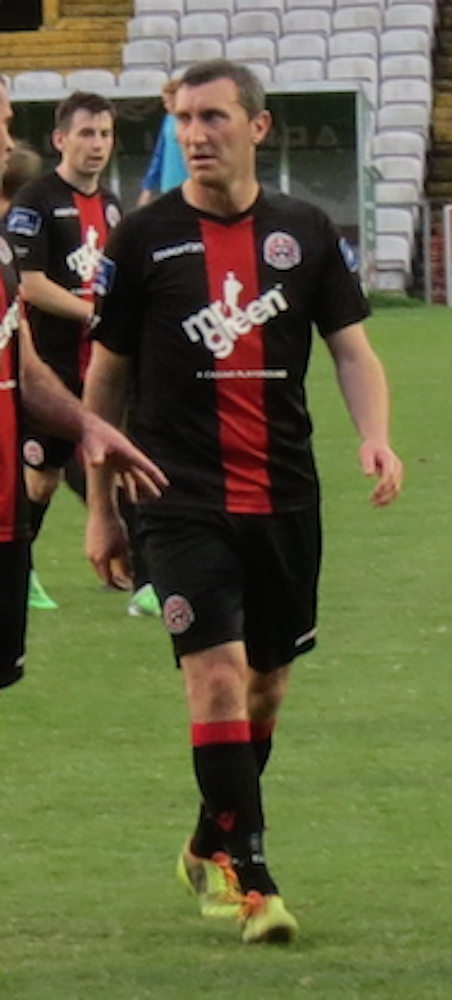
Jason Byrne, Player of the Month winner for a record six times.

Month	Nationality	Player	Team	Position
August	Ireland	Derek Coughlan	Cork City	DF
September	Ireland	Jason Byrne	Bray Wanderers	FW
October	Ireland	Trevor Molloy	St Patrick's Athletic	FW
November	Ireland	John Caulfield	Cork City	FW
December	Ireland	Aidan Lynch	UCD	DF
January	Ireland	Martin Russell	St Patrick's Athletic	MF
February	Ireland	Richie Baker	Shelbourne	MF
March	Ireland	Paul Coughlan	Cobh Ramblers	FW
April	Ireland	Michael Devine	Waterford United	GK

=== 1999–00 ===
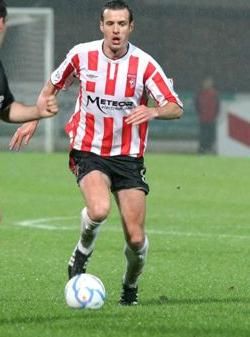
Ciarán Martyn, February 1999 Player of the Month.

Month	Nationality	Player	Team	Position
August	Ireland	Shane Robinson	Shamrock Rovers	MF
September	Ireland	Pat Fenlon	Shelbourne	MF
October	Ireland	Pat Morley	Cork City	FW
November	Ireland	Trevor Molloy	St Patrick's Athletic	FW
December	Wales	Steve Williams	Shelbourne	GK
January	Ireland	Michael Dempsey	Bohemians	GK
February	Ireland	Ciarán Martyn	UCD	DF
March	Ireland	Dessie Baker	Shelbourne	FW
April	Ireland	Colm Tresson	Bray Wanderers	DF

=== 2000–01 ===
Month	Nationality	Player	Team	Position
August	England	Kevin Hunt	Bohemians	MF
September	Ireland	Glen Crowe	Bohemians	FW
October	Ireland	Glen Crowe	Bohemians	FW
November	Ireland	Stephen O'Brien	Longford Town	GK
December	Ireland	Richie Baker	Shelbourne	MF
January	Ireland	Paul Doolin	Shelbourne	MF
February	Ireland	Liam Kelly	St Patrick's Athletic	FW
March	N/A	No Award	N/A	N/A
April	England	Mark Rutherford	Bohemians	FW

=== 2001–02 ===
Charles Livingstone Mbabazi, Player of the Month for September 2001. He was the first African to win the award.

Month	Nationality	Player	Team	Position
August	Ireland	Stephen O'Brien	Longford Town	GK
September	Uganda	Charles Mbabazi Livingstone	St Patrick's Athletic	MF
October	Northern Ireland	Darren Kelly	Derry City	DF
November	Ireland	Ollie Cahill	Cork City	MF
December	Ireland	Kevin Doherty	Shelbourne	DF
January	Ireland	Billy Woods	Shamrock Rovers	MF
February	Ireland	Ger McCarthy	St Patrick's Athletic	FW
March	Ireland	Darragh Maguire	St Patrick's Athletic	DF

=== 2002–03 ===
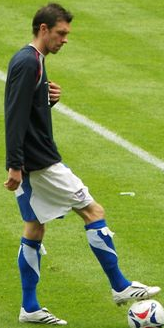
George O'Callaghan, Player of the Month for the month of July 2002.

Month	Nationality	Player	Team	Position
July	Ireland	John O'Flynn	Cork City	FW
August	Ireland	George O'Callaghan	Cork City	FW
September	Barbados	Eric Lavine	Longford Town	FW
October	Northern Ireland	Eamon Doherty	Derry City	MF
November	Ireland	Glen Crowe	Bohemians	FW
December	Ireland	Barry Ryan	UCD	GK
January	England	Kevin Hunt	Bohemians	MF

=== 2003 ===
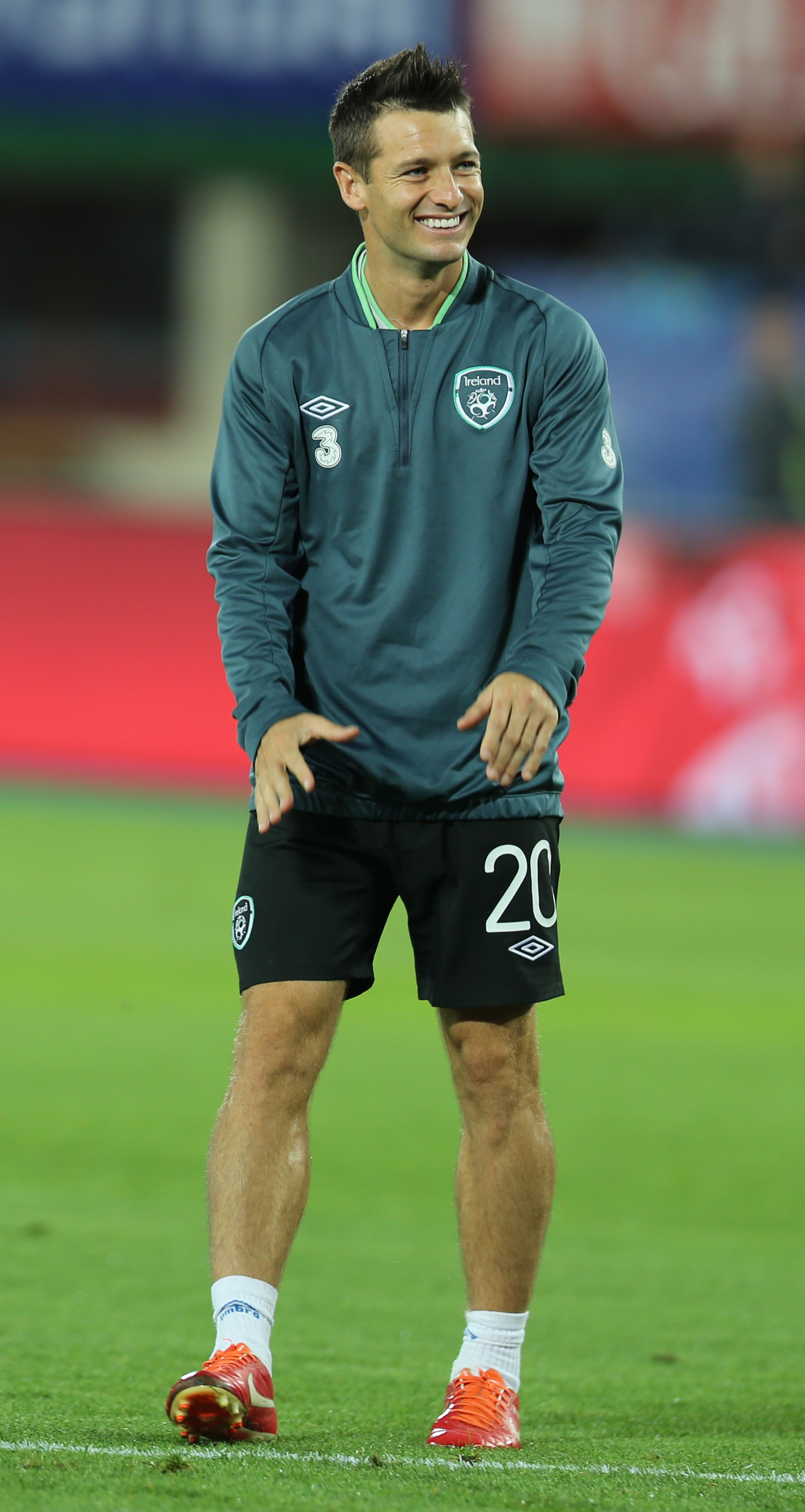
Wes Hoolahan, Player of the month for July 2004.

Month	Nationality	Player	Team	Position
April	Ireland	John O'Flynn	Cork City	FW
May	Wales	Steve Williams	Shelbourne	GK
June	Ireland	Tony Grant	Shamrock Rovers	FW
July	Ireland	Colin Hawkins	Bohemians	DF
August	England	Chris Adamson	St Patrick's Athletic	GK
September	Ireland	Jason Byrne	Shelbourne	FW
October	Ireland	Shane Barrett	Longford Town	FW
November	Wales	Jamie Harris	Shelbourne	DF

=== 2004 ===
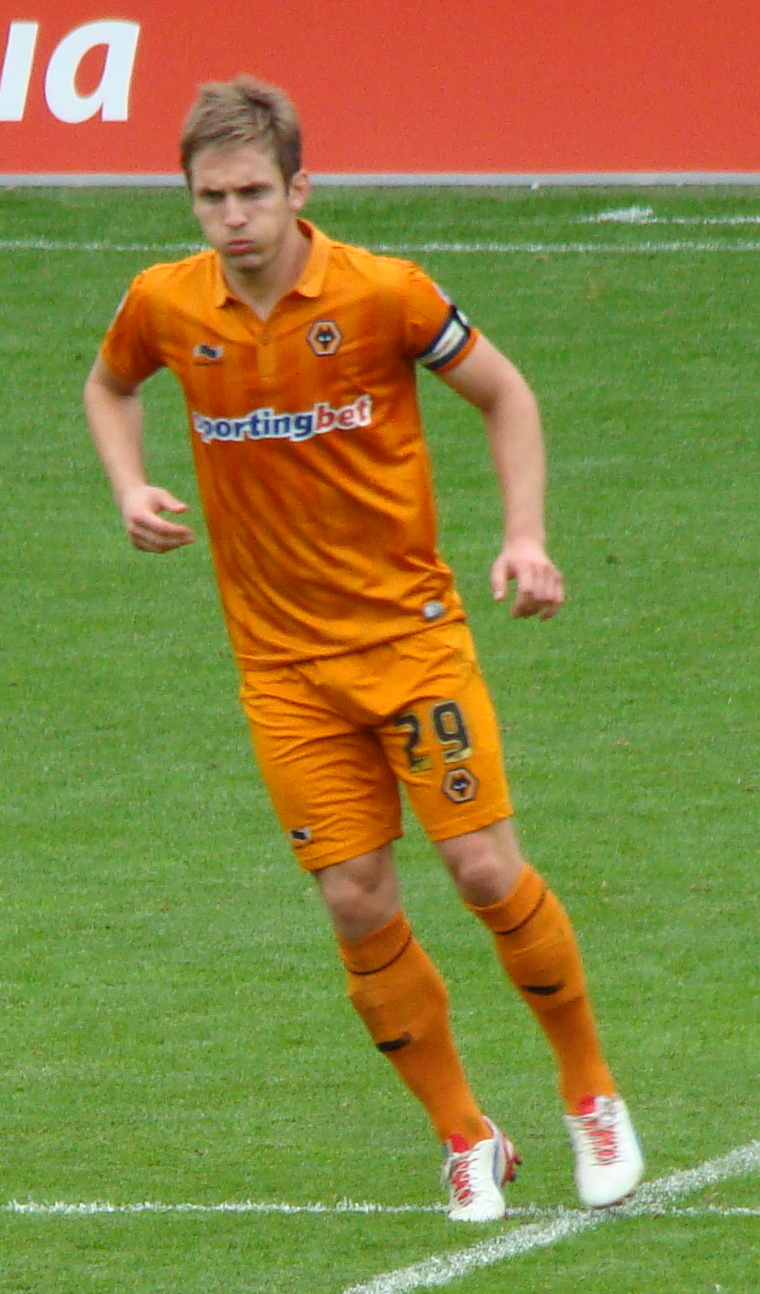
Kevin Doyle, November 2004's Player of the Month.

Month	Nationality	Player	Team	Position
April	Ireland	Jason Byrne	Shelbourne	FW
May	Ireland	Trevor Molloy	Shamrock Rovers	FW
June	Ireland	Liam Kearney	Cork City	MF
July	Ireland	Wes Hoolahan	Shelbourne	MF
August	Ireland	Owen Heary	Shelbourne	DF
September	Ireland	Daryl Murphy	Waterford United	FW
October	Ireland	Dave Warren	Cobh Ramblers	FW
November	Ireland	Kevin Doyle	Cork City	FW

=== 2005 ===
Month	Nationality	Player	Team	Position
March/April	Ireland	Richie Baker	Shelbourne	MF
May	Ireland	George O'Callaghan	Cork City	FW
July	Ireland	Mark Farren	Derry City	FW
August	Ireland	Liam Kearney	Cork City	MF
September	Northern Ireland	Peter Hutton	Derry City	DF
October	Ireland	Jason Byrne	Shelbourne	FW
November	Ireland	Roy O'Donovan	Cork City	FW

=== 2006 ===
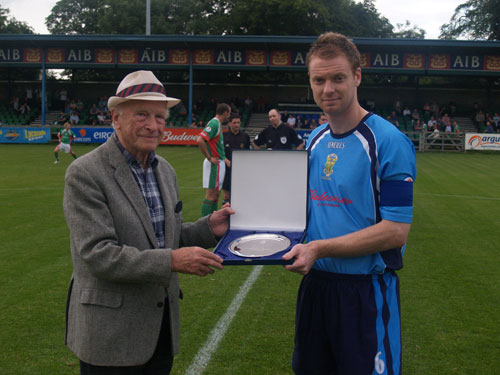
Tony McDonnell, receiving the award in March 2006.

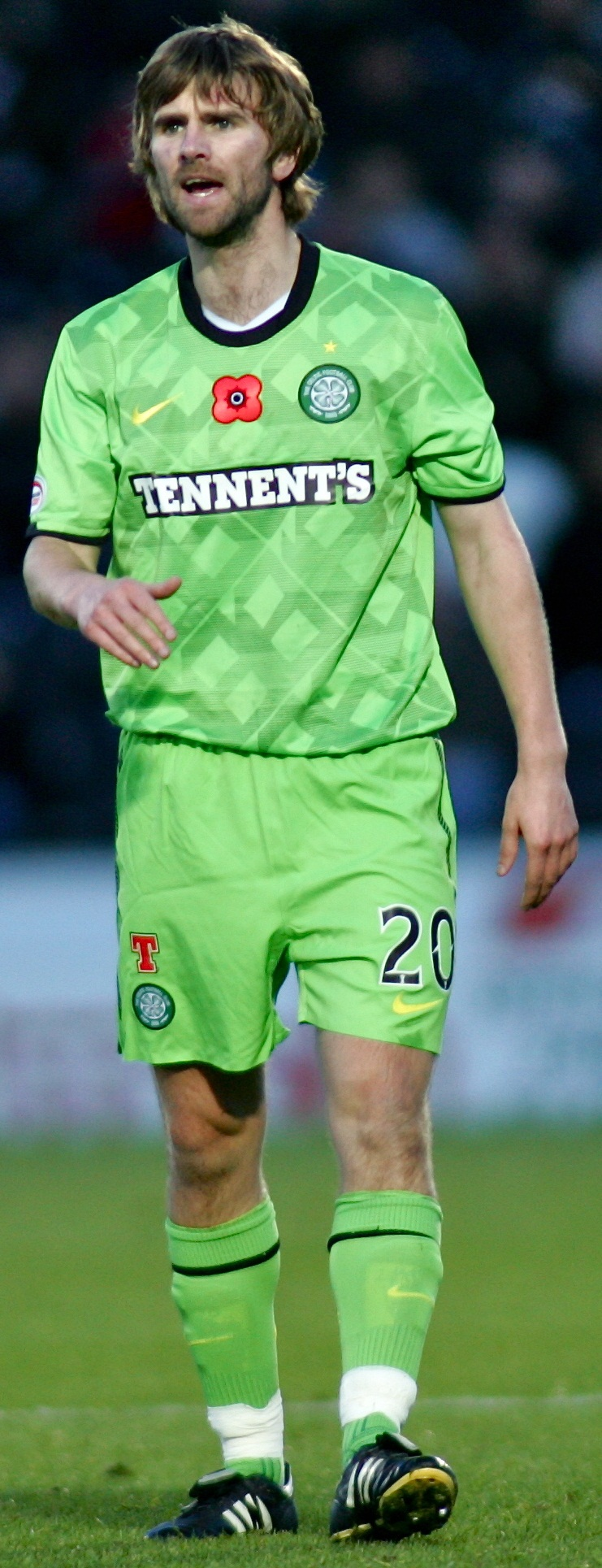
Paddy McCourt, Player of the Month for June 2006.

Month	Nationality	Player	Team	Position
March	Ireland	Tony McDonnell	UCD	DF
April	Ireland	Glen Fitzpatrick	Shelbourne	FW
May	Ireland	Graham Gartland	Drogheda United	DF
June	Northern Ireland	Paddy McCourt	Derry City	MF
July	Ireland	Dan Murray	Cork City	DF
August	Northern Ireland	Kevin Deery	Derry City	MF
September	Ireland	Joe Gamble	Cork City	MF
October	Ireland	Owen Heary	Shelbourne	DF

=== 2007 ===
Month	Nationality	Player	Team	Position
March	Ireland	Alan Kirby	St Patrick's Athletic	MF
April	Ireland	Brian Shelley	Drogheda United	DF
May	Ireland	Tadhg Purcell	Shamrock Rovers	FW
June	Ireland	Derek Glynn	Galway United	FW
July	England	Matthew Judge	Sligo Rovers	FW
August	Ireland	Dave Mooney	Longford Town	FW
September	Ireland	Guy Bates	Drogheda United	FW
October	Ireland	Brian Shelley	Drogheda United	DF

=== 2008 ===
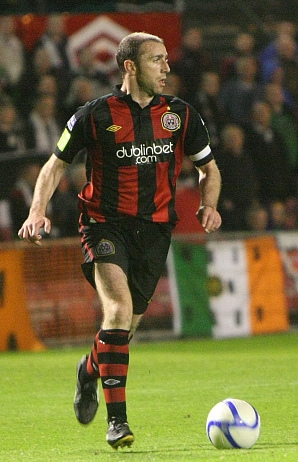
Owen Heary, three time Player of the Month, in August 2004, October 2006 & October 2008.

Month	Nationality	Player	Team	Position
March	Ireland	Keith Fahey	St Patrick's Athletic	MF
April	Ireland	Patrick Kavanagh	Bray Wanderers	MF
May	Ireland	Killian Brennan	Bohemians	MF
June	Ireland	Dave Mooney	Cork City	FW
July	Ireland	Ollie Cahill	Drogheda United	MF
August	Ireland	Mark Quigley	St Patrick's Athletic	FW
September	Ireland	Gary Deegan	Bohemians	MF
October	Ireland	Owen Heary	Bohemians	DF
November	Ireland	Brian Murphy	Bohemians	GK

=== 2009 ===
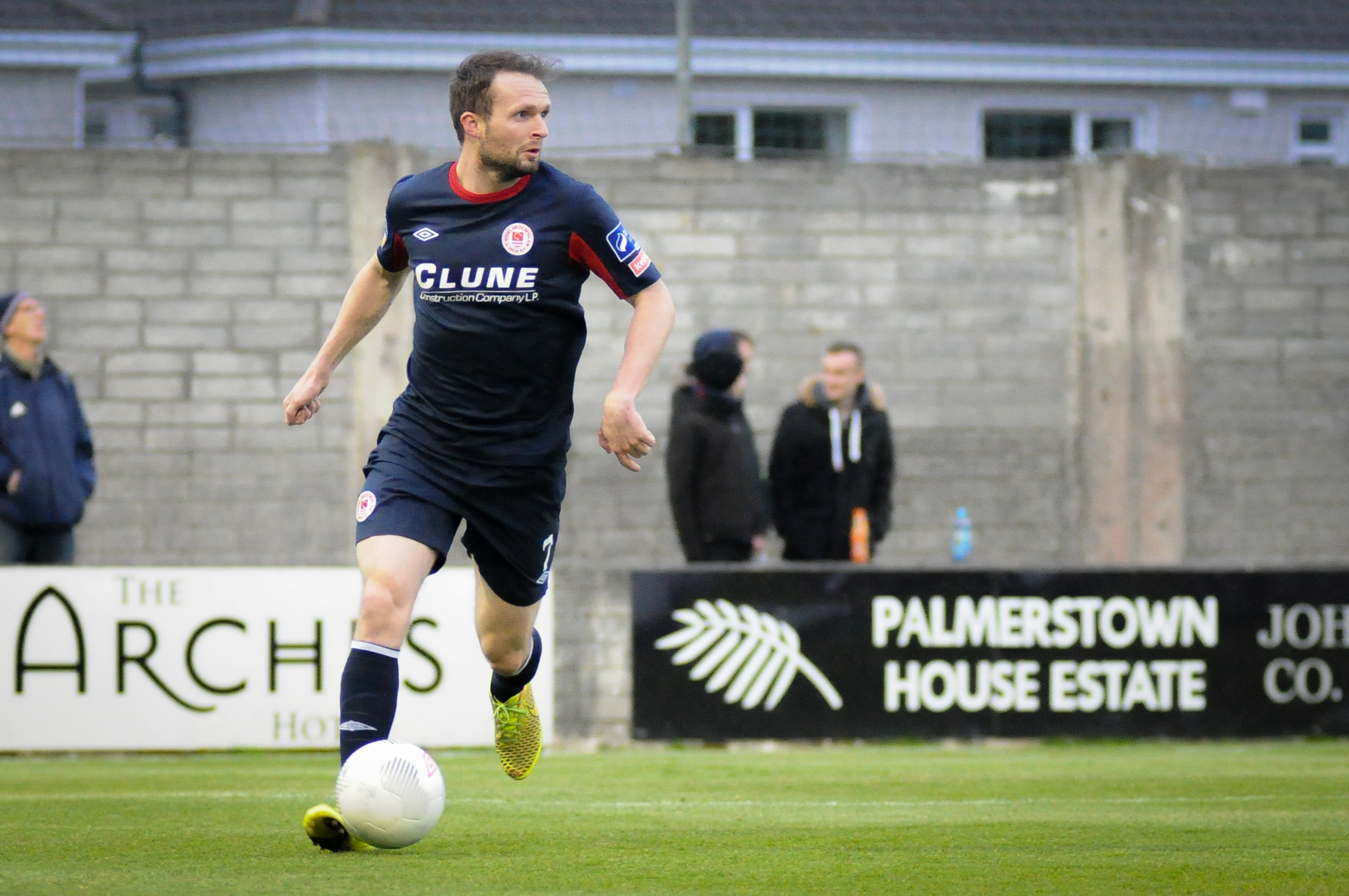
Conan Byrne, the Player of the Month for November 2009.

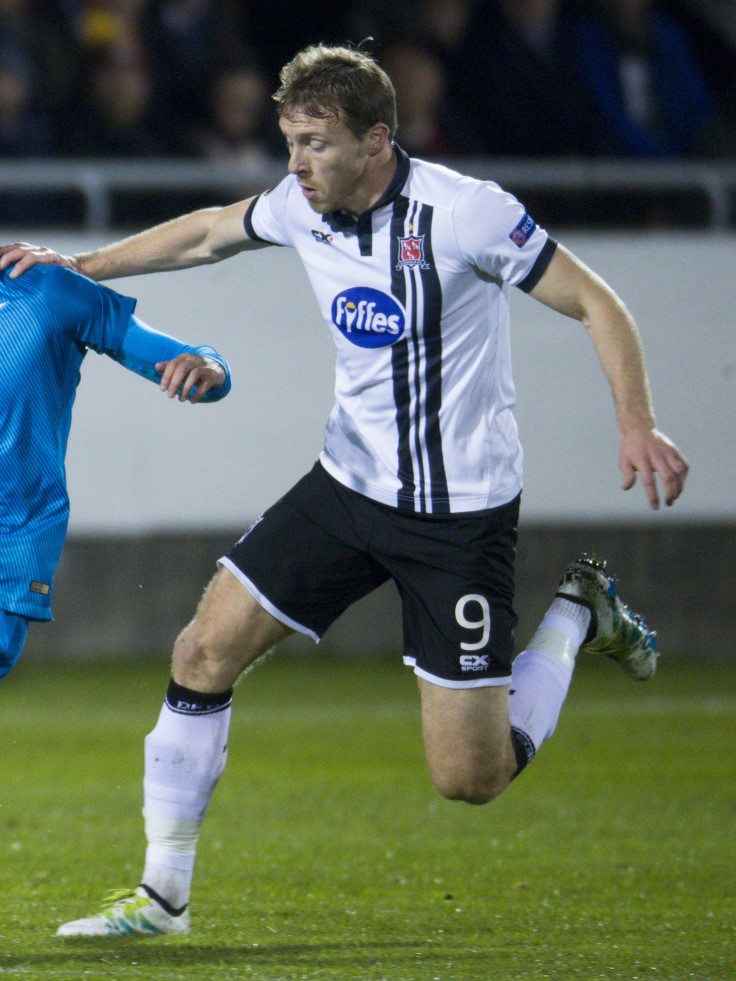
David McMillan, four time Player of the Month, in May 2010, March 2015, July 2016 and November/December 2020.

Month	Nationality	Player	Team	Position
March	Ireland	Derek O'Brien	Galway United	MF
April	Scotland	Gary Twigg	Shamrock Rovers	FW
May	Ireland	Colin Healy	Cork City	MF
June	Ireland	Raffaele Cretaro	Sligo Rovers	FW
July	Ireland	Declan O'Brien	St Patrick's Athletic	FW
August	Ireland	Brian Shelley	Bohemians	DF
September	Scotland	Gary Twigg	Shamrock Rovers	FW
October	Ireland	Raffaele Cretaro	Sligo Rovers	FW
November	Ireland	Conan Byrne	Sporting Fingal	MF

=== 2010 ===
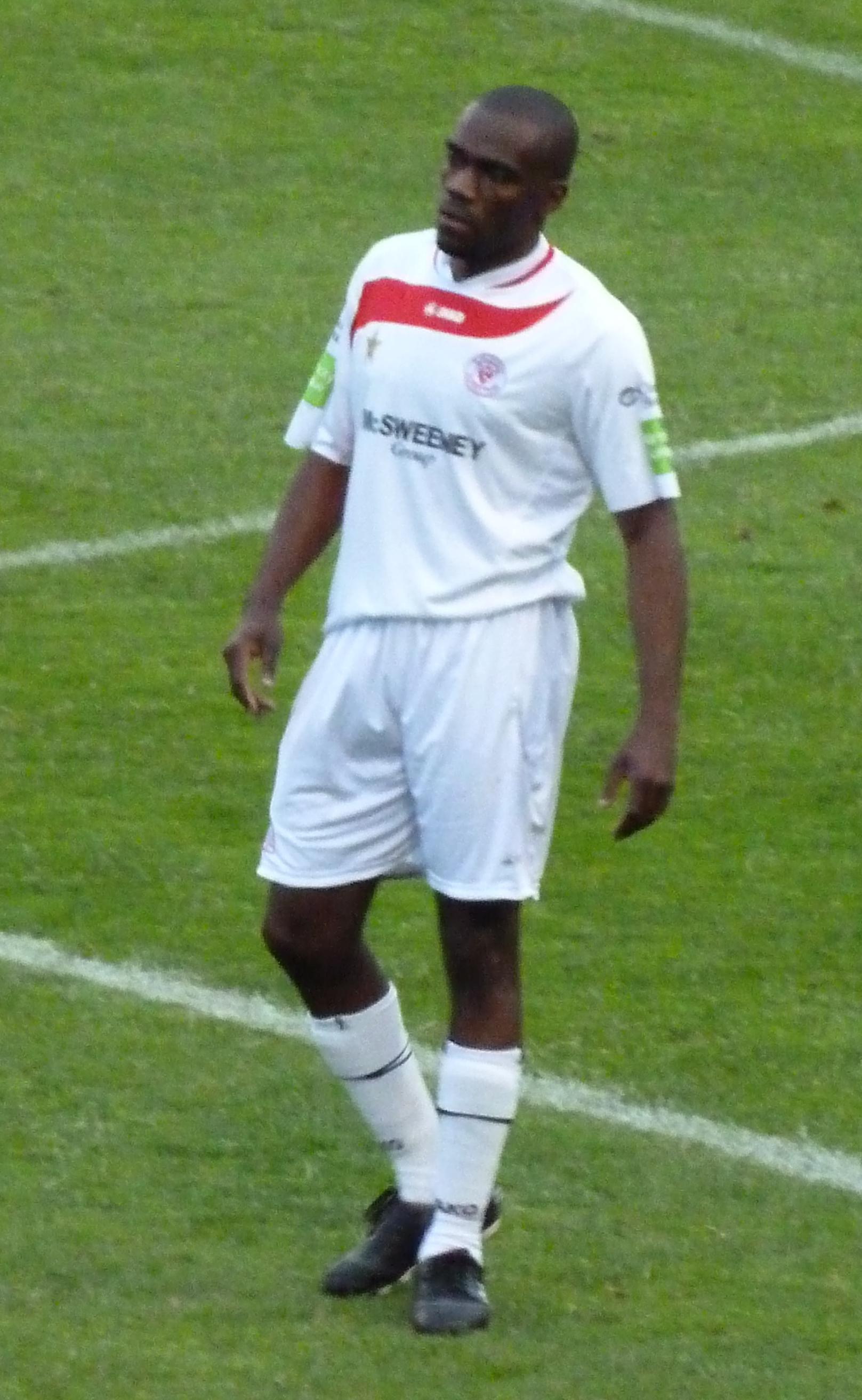
Joseph Ndo, the Player of the Month for September 2011.

Month	Nationality	Player	Team	Position
March	Ireland	Conor Kenna	St Patrick's Athletic	DF
April	Ireland	Karl Sheppard	Galway United	FW
May	Ireland	David McMillan	UCD	FW
June	Ireland	Paddy Madden	Bohemians	FW
July	Ireland	Dave Mulcahy	St Patrick's Athletic	MF
August	Ireland	Aidan Price	Shamrock Rovers	DF
September	Ireland	Jake Kelly	Bray Wanderers	FW
October	Ireland	Richie Ryan	Sligo Rovers	MF
November	Ireland	Ciaran Kelly	Sligo Rovers	GK

=== 2011 ===
Month	Nationality	Player	Team	Position
March	Ireland	Mark Quigley	Dundalk	FW
April	Ireland	Gary Dempsey	Bray Wanderers	MF
May	Ireland	Eoin Doyle	Sligo Rovers	FW
June	England	Danny North	St Patrick's Athletic	FW
July	Ireland	Conor McCormack	Shamrock Rovers	MF
August	Ireland	Patrick Sullivan	Shamrock Rovers	DF
September	Cameroon	Joseph Ndo	Sligo Rovers	MF
October	Ireland	Karl Sheppard	Shamrock Rovers	FW
November	Ireland	Stephen Paisley	Shelbourne	DF

=== 2012 ===
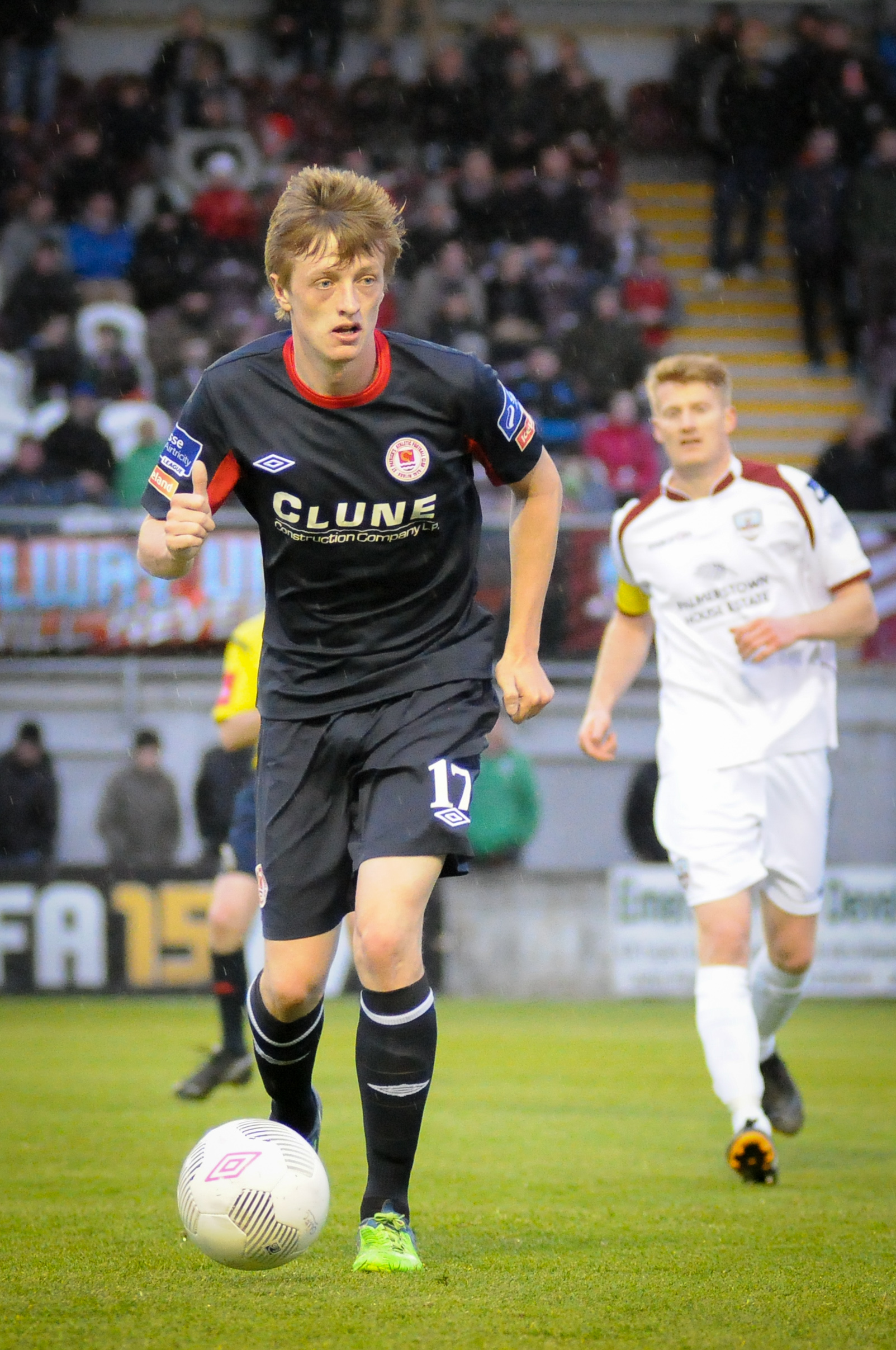
Chris Forrester, four-time winner of Player of the Month, in April 2012, April 2014, June 2015 and March/April 2021.

Month	Nationality	Player	Team	Position
March	Scotland	Gary Twigg	Shamrock Rovers	FW
April	Ireland	Chris Forrester	St Patrick's Athletic	MF
May	Ireland	Jason Byrne	Bray Wanderers	FW
June	England	Danny North	Sligo Rovers	FW
July	Ireland	Christy Fagan	St Patrick's Athletic	FW
August	Ireland	Mark Quigley	Sligo Rovers	FW
September	Ireland	Jason McGuinness	Sligo Rovers	DF
October	Scotland	Gary Twigg	Shamrock Rovers	FW
November	Northern Ireland	Rory Patterson	Derry City	FW

=== 2013 ===
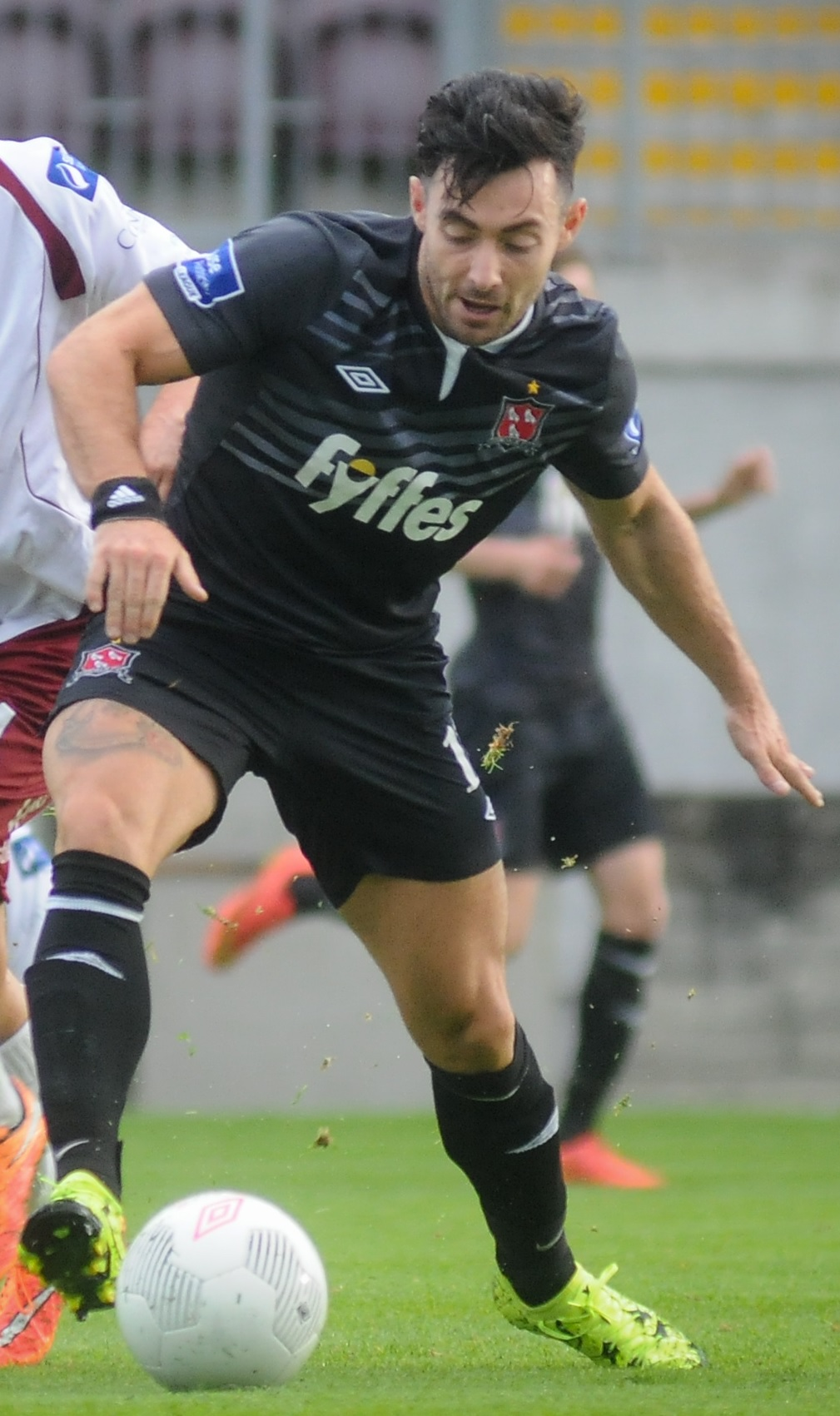
Richie Towell, five time Player of the Month, in August 2013, July 2014 and April, September & November 2015.

Month	Nationality	Player	Team	Position
March	England	Anthony Elding	Sligo Rovers	FW
April	Ireland	Barry McNamee	Derry City	MF
May	Ireland	Killian Brennan	St Patrick's Athletic	MF
June	Ireland	Jason Byrne	Bray Wanderers	FW
July	Ireland	Patrick Hoban	Dundalk	FW
August	Ireland	Richie Towell	Dundalk	MF
September	Ireland	Anthony Flood	St Patrick's Athletic	FW
October	Ireland	Ciarán Kilduff	Cork City	FW
November	England	Danny North	Sligo Rovers	FW

=== 2014 ===
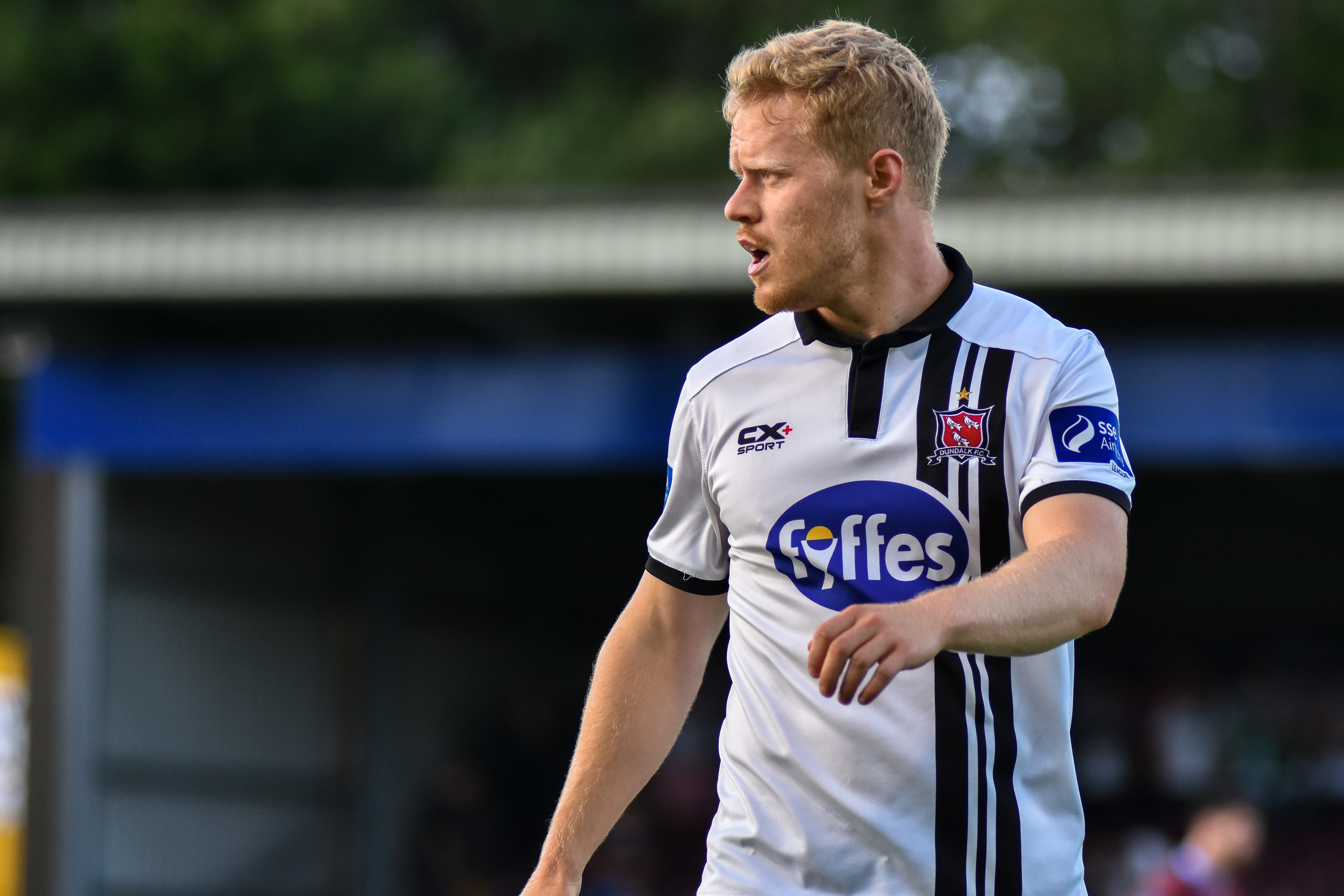
Daryl Horgan, Player of the Month, in May 2014, 2015 & 2016, September 2016 & May 2026

Month	Nationality	Player	Team	Position
March	Ireland	Gary O'Neill	Drogheda United	FW
April	Ireland	Chris Forrester	St Patrick's Athletic	MF
May	Ireland	Daryl Horgan	Dundalk	MF
June	Ireland	Mark O'Sullivan	Cork City	FW
July	Ireland	Richie Towell	Dundalk	MF
August	Ireland	Rory Gaffney	Limerick	FW
September	Ireland	Dane Massey	Dundalk	DF
October	Ireland	Patrick Hoban	Dundalk	FW
November	Ireland	Christy Fagan	St Patrick's Athletic	FW

=== 2015 ===
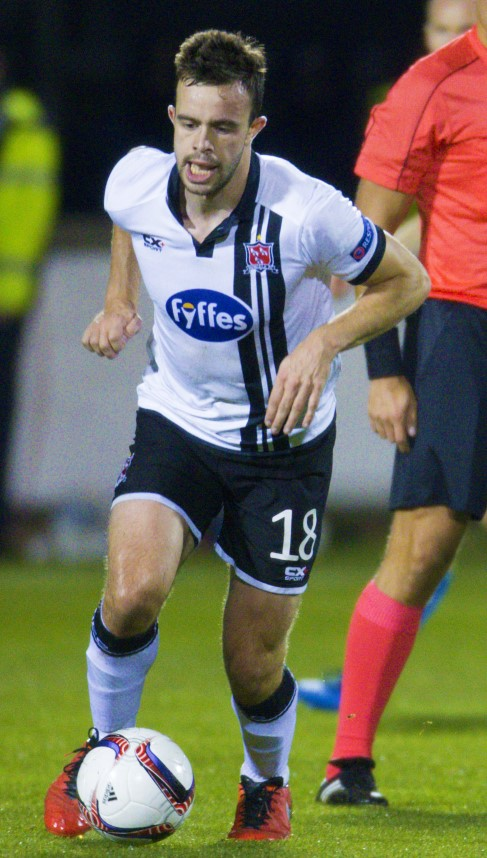
Robbie Benson, Player of the Month for August 2016.

Month	Nationality	Player	Team	Position
March	Ireland	David McMillan	Dundalk	FW
April	Ireland	Richie Towell	Dundalk	MF
May	Ireland	Daryl Horgan	Dundalk	MF
June	Ireland	Chris Forrester	St Patrick's Athletic	MF
July	Ireland	Ryan Swan	UCD	FW
August	Ireland	Vinny Faherty	Limerick	FW
September	Ireland	Richie Towell	Dundalk	MF
October	Ireland	Ian Turner	Limerick	MF
November	Ireland	Richie Towell	Dundalk	MF

=== 2016 ===
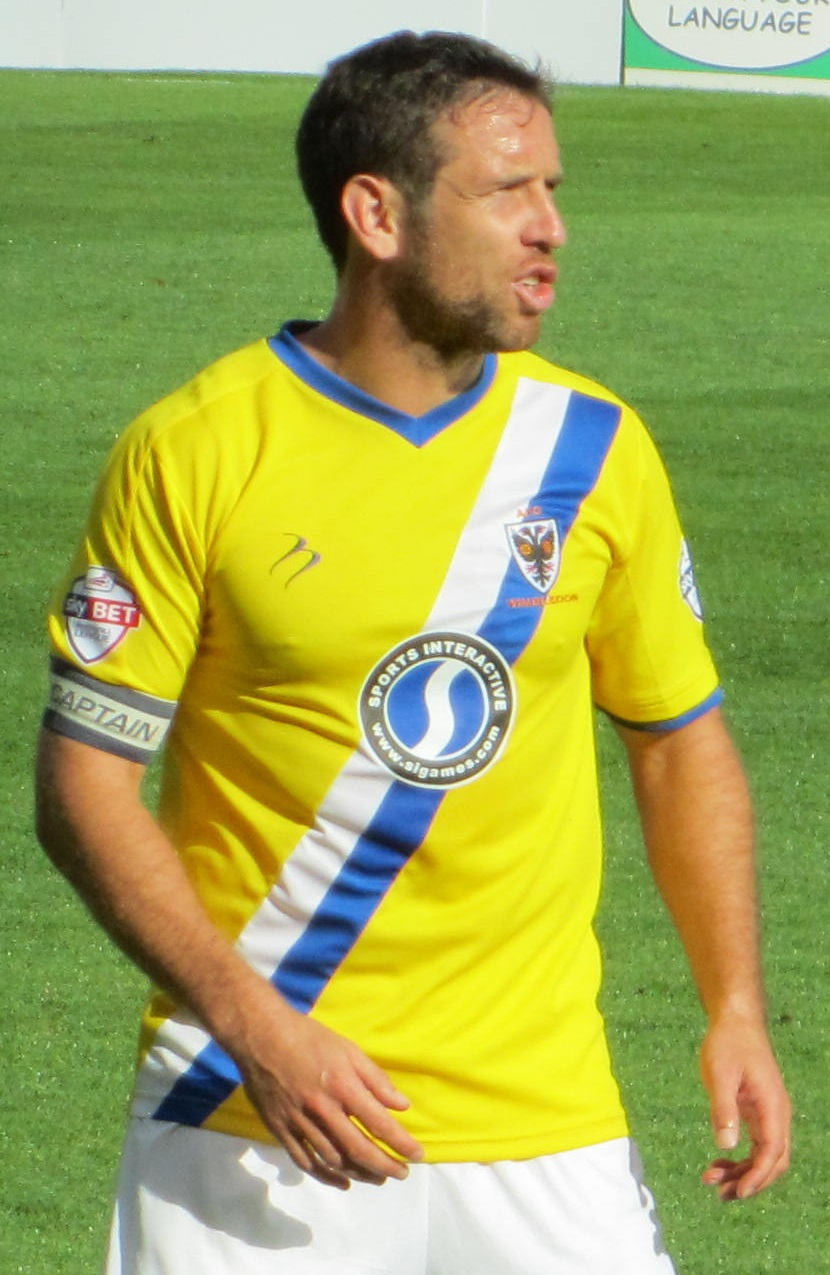
Alan Bennett, Player of the Month for November 2016 and October 2017.

Month	Nationality	Player	Team	Position
March	Ireland	Christy Fagan	St Patrick's Athletic	FW
April	Ireland	Ronan Finn	Dundalk	MF
May	Ireland	Daryl Horgan	Dundalk	MF
June	Ireland	Greg Bolger	Cork City	MF
July	Ireland	David McMillan	Dundalk	FW
August	Ireland	Robbie Benson	Dundalk	MF
September	Ireland	Daryl Horgan	Dundalk	MF
October	Ireland	Chris Shields	Dundalk	MF
November	Ireland	Alan Bennett	Cork City	DF

=== 2017 ===
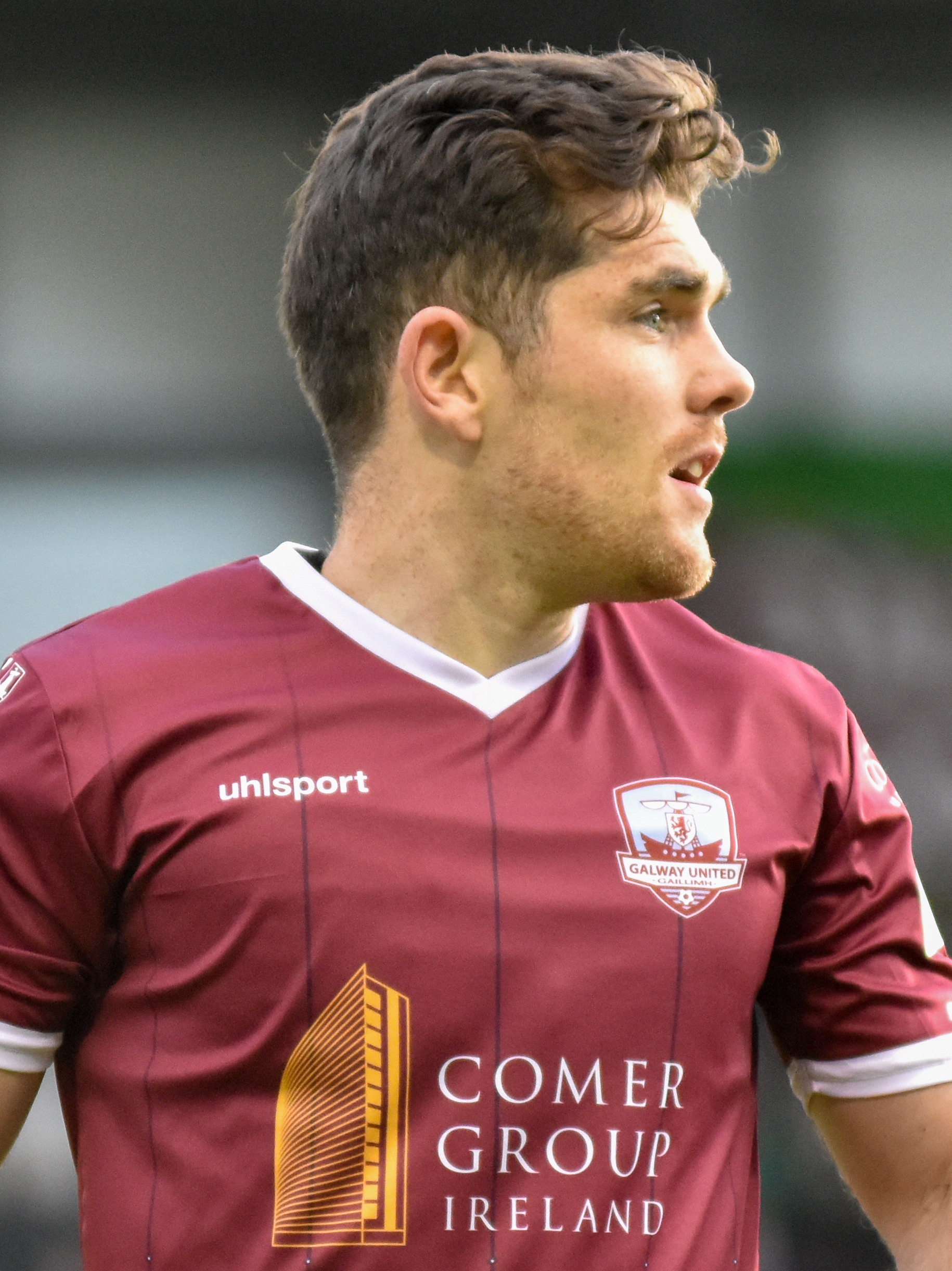
Ronan Murray, Player of the Month for August 2017.

Month	Nationality	Player	Team	Position
March	Ireland	Sean Maguire	Cork City	FW
April	Ireland	Conor McCormack	Cork City	MF
May	Ireland	Ryan Delaney	Cork City	DF
June	Ireland	Patrick McEleney	Dundalk	MF
July	Ireland	Fuad Sule	Bohemians	MF
August	Ireland	Ronan Murray	Galway United	FW
September	Ireland	Brandon Miele	Shamrock Rovers	MF
October	Ireland	Alan Bennett	Cork City	DF
November	Ireland	Mark McNulty	Cork City	GK

=== 2018 ===
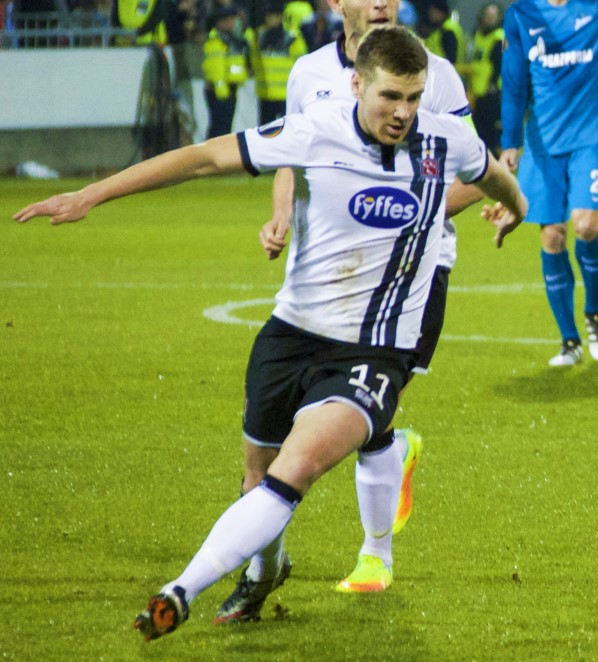
Patrick McEleney, Player of the Month for June 2017 & October 2018.

Month	Nationality	Player	Team	Position
February	Ireland	Graham Cummins	Cork City	FW
March	Ireland	Graham Burke	Shamrock Rovers	FW
April	Ireland	Michael Duffy	Dundalk	MF
May	Ireland	Seán Hoare	Dundalk	DF
June	Ireland	Patrick Hoban	Dundalk	FW
July	Ireland	Gavin Bazunu	Shamrock Rovers	GK
August	Ireland	Michael Duffy	Dundalk	MF
September	Ireland	Chris Shields	Dundalk	MF
October	Ireland	Patrick McEleney	Dundalk	MF

=== 2019 ===
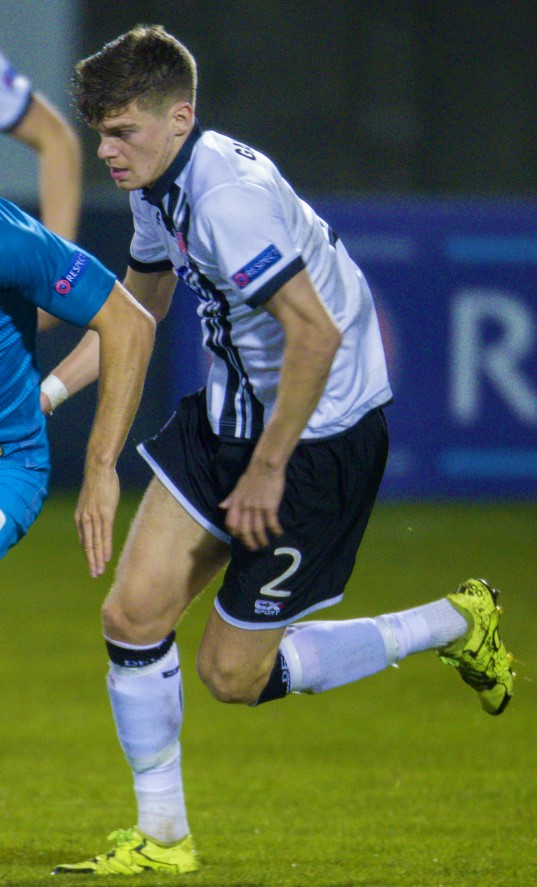
Sean Gannon, Player of the Month for May 2019.

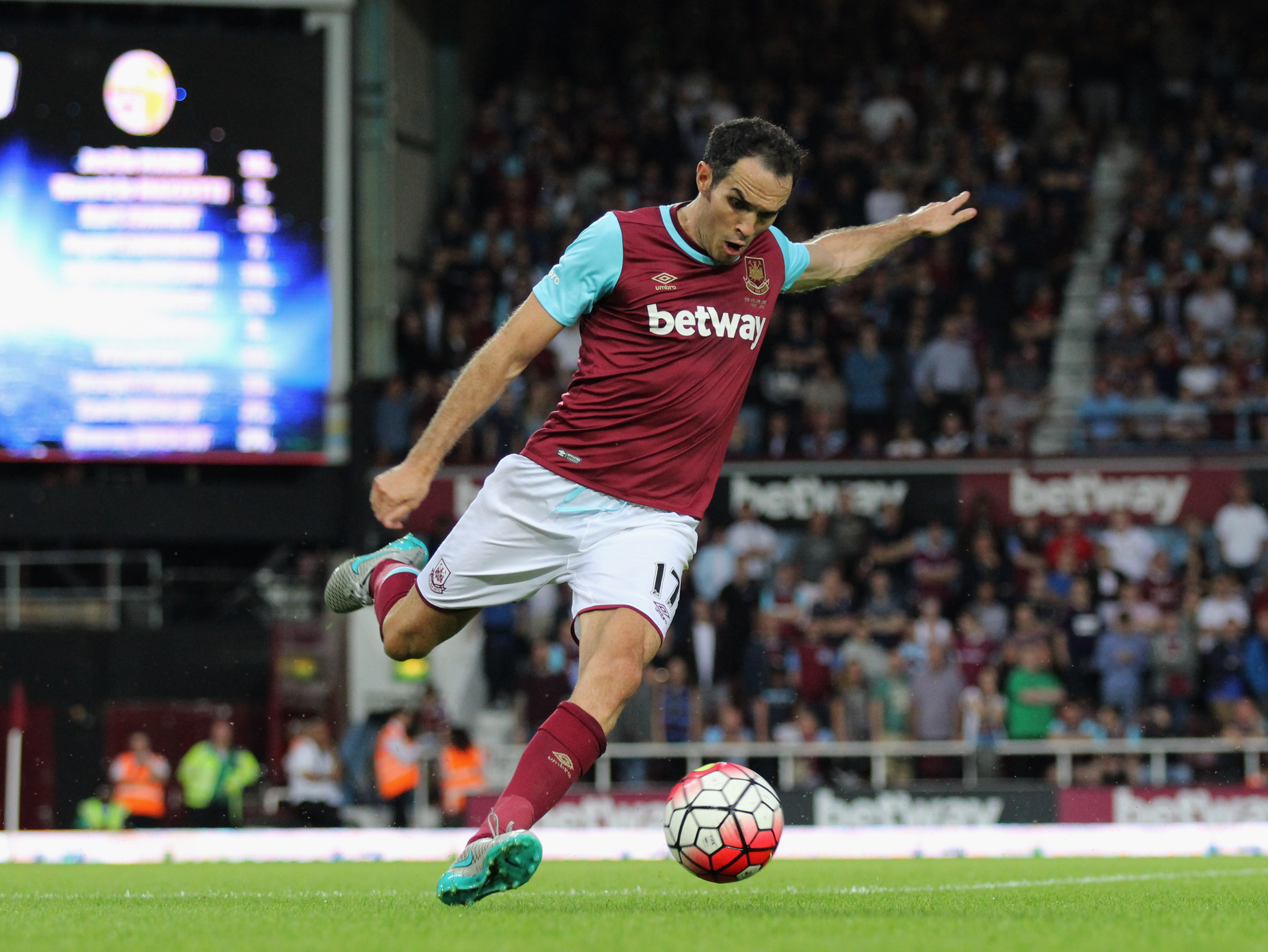
Joey O'Brien, Player of the Month for October 2019.

Month	Nationality	Player	Team	Position
February	Ireland	Dinny Corcoran	Bohemians	FW
March	Ireland	Jack Byrne	Shamrock Rovers	MF
April	Ireland	James Talbot	Bohemians	GK
May	Ireland	Sean Gannon	Dundalk	DF
June	Ireland	Danny Mandroiu	Bohemians	MF
July	Ireland	Jack Byrne	Shamrock Rovers	MF
August	Ireland	Daniel Cleary	Dundalk	DF
September	Ireland	Michael Duffy	Dundalk	MF
October	Ireland	Joey O'Brien	Shamrock Rovers	DF

=== 2020 ===
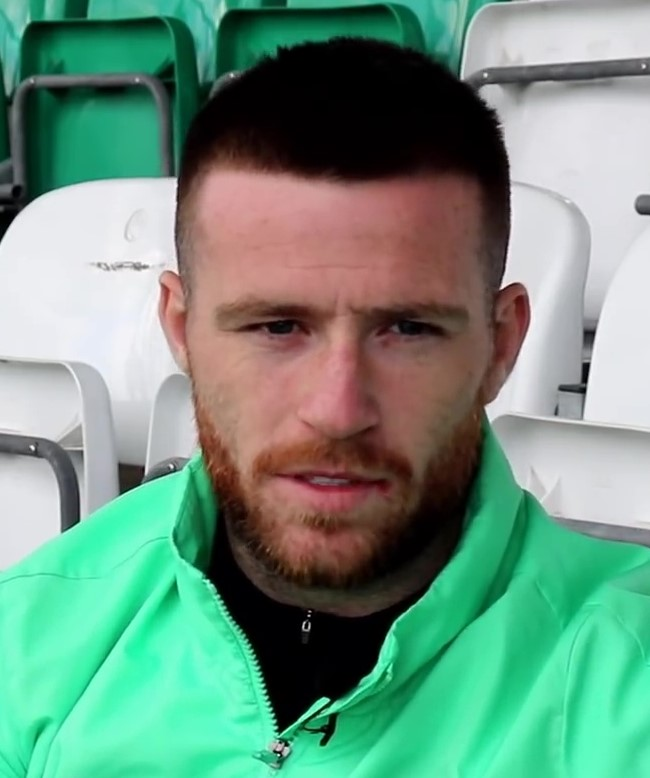
Jack Byrne, four-time winner of Player of the Month, in March 2019, July 2019, February 2020 and September 2020.

Month	Nationality	Player	Team	Position
February	Ireland	Jack Byrne	Shamrock Rovers	MF
March	N/A	No award	N/A	N/A
April	N/A	No award	N/A	N/A
May	N/A	No award	N/A	N/A
June	N/A	No award	N/A	N/A
July	N/A	No award	N/A	N/A
August	Ireland	Danny Grant	Bohemians	MF
September	Ireland	Jack Byrne	Shamrock Rovers	MF
October	Ireland	Sean Murray	Dundalk	MF
November/December	Ireland	David McMillan	Dundalk	FW

=== 2021 ===
Month	Nationality	Player	Team	Position
March/April	Ireland	Chris Forrester	St Patrick's Athletic	MF
May	Ireland	Greg Bolger	Sligo Rovers	MF
June	Ireland	Georgie Kelly	Bohemians	FW
July	Ireland	Dawson Devoy	Bohemians	MF
August	Scotland	Ali Coote	Bohemians	MF
September	Ireland	Georgie Kelly	Bohemians	FW
October	Ireland	Danny Mandroiu	Shamrock Rovers	MF
November	Ireland	Colm Whelan	UCD	FW

=== 2022 ===
Month	Nationality	Player	Team	Position
February	Scotland	Steven Bradley	Dundalk	MF
March	Ireland	Aidan Keena	Sligo Rovers	FW
April	Northern Ireland	Jamie McGonigle	Derry City	FW
May	Ireland	Daniel Kelly	Dundalk	MF
June	Ireland	Mark Connolly	Dundalk	DF
July	Ireland	Aidan Keena	Sligo Rovers	FW
August	Ireland	Andy Lyons	Shamrock Rovers	DF
September	Scotland	Phoenix Patterson	Waterford	MF
October	Ireland	Rory Gaffney	Shamrock Rovers	FW
November	England	Cameron McJannet	Derry City	DF

=== 2023 ===
Month	Nationality	Player	Team	Position
February	Ireland	Jordan McEneff	Derry City	MF
March	Scotland	Ali Coote	Bohemians	MF
April	Ireland	Ronan Coughlan	Waterford	FW
May	England	Freddie Draper	Drogheda United	FW
June	Ireland	Patrick Hoban	Dundalk	FW
July	Ireland	Jonathan Afolabi	Bohemians	FW
August	Ireland	James Clarke	Bohemians	MF
September	Ireland	Ruairí Keating	Cork City	FW
October	Ireland	Jack Moylan	Shelbourne	FW
November	Ireland	Ronan Coughlan	Waterford	FW

=== 2024 ===
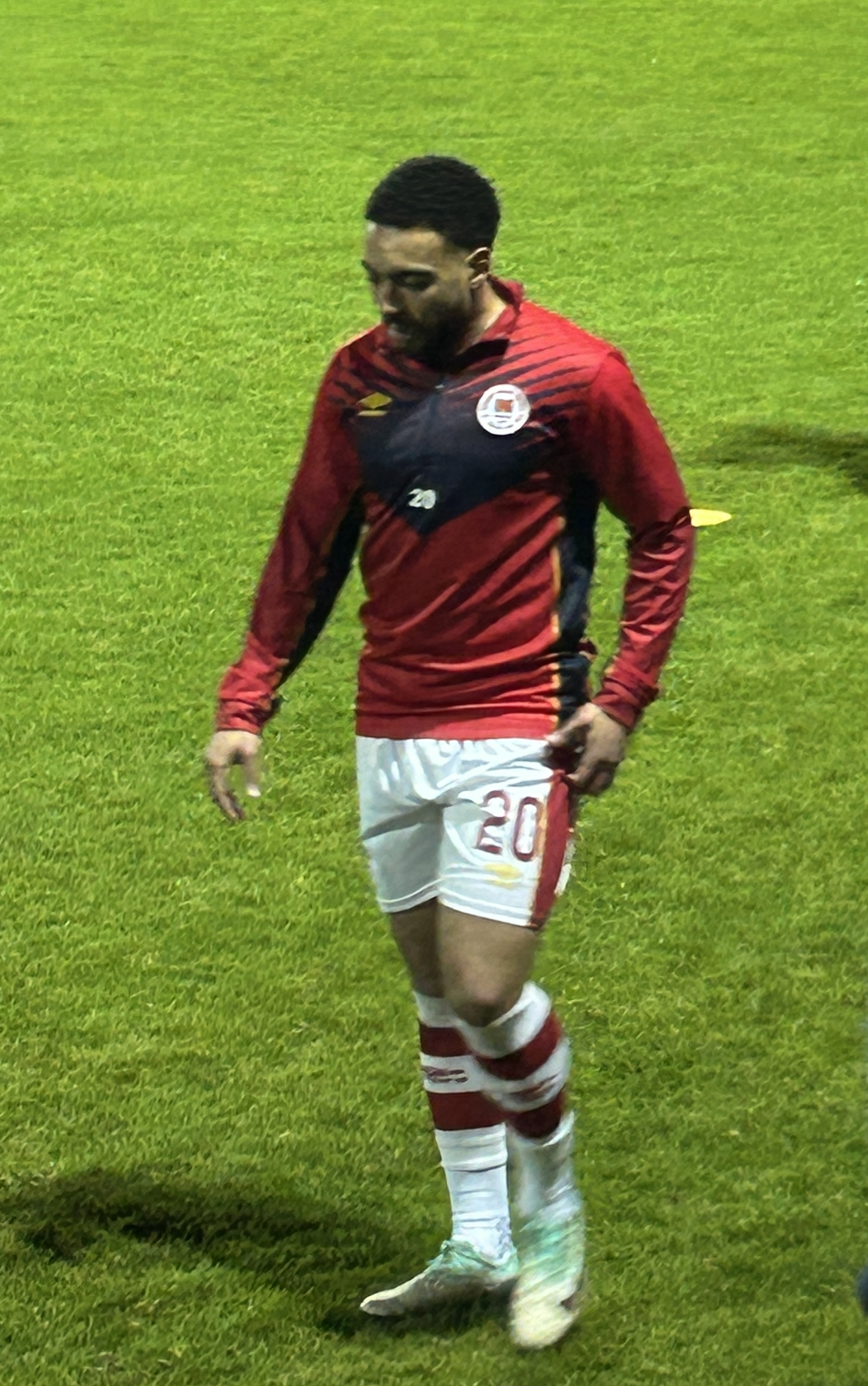
Jake Mulraney, Player of the Month in September 2024.

Month	Nationality	Player	Team	Position
February	Ireland	Mark Coyle	Shelbourne	MF
March	England	Will Jarvis	Shelbourne	FW
April	Ireland	Aaron Greene	Shamrock Rovers	FW
May	Ireland	Pádraig Amond	Waterford	FW
June	England	Will Jarvis	Shelbourne	FW
July	Ireland	Wilson Waweru	Sligo Rovers	FW
August	United States	Patrick Hickey	Galway United	MF
September	Ireland	Jake Mulraney	St Patrick's Athletic	MF
October	Ireland	Seán Boyd	Shelbourne	FW
November	Ireland	Darragh Markey	Drogheda United	MF

=== 2025 ===
Month	Nationality	Player	Team	Position
February	Ireland	Aidan Keena	St Patrick's Athletic	FW
March	Ireland	Darragh Markey	Drogheda United	MF
April	New Zealand	Moses Dyer	Galway United	FW
May	Ireland	Graham Burke	Shamrock Rovers	FW
June	Ireland	Michael Duffy	Derry City	MF
July	Ireland	Pádraig Amond	Waterford	FW
August	England	Harry Wood	Shelbourne	MF
September	Ireland	Matt Healy	Shamrock Rovers	MF
October	Scotland	Kerr McInroy	Shelbourne	MF
November	Ireland	Rory Gaffney	Shamrock Rovers	FW

=== 2026 ===
Month	Nationality	Player	Team	Position
February	Ireland	Michael Duffy	Derry City	MF
March	United States	Patrick Hickey	Bohemians	DF
April	Ireland	Will Fitzgerald	Sligo Rovers	MF
May	Ireland	Daryl Horgan	Dundalk	MF
June	Northern Ireland	Eoin Kenny	Dundalk	FW
July	Ireland	Tommy Lonergan	Waterford	FW
August	Ireland	John Mahon	Waterford	DF
September	Ireland	Aidan Keena	St Patrick's Athletic	FW
October	Ireland	Pádraig Amond	Waterford	FW
November				

== Multiple winners ==
The below table lists those who have won on more than one occasion.

*	Indicates current League of Ireland Premier Division player
Italics	Indicates players still playing professional football

Rank	Player	Wins	Last win
1st	Jason Byrne	6	June 2013
2nd	Daryl Horgan*	5	May 2026
2nd	Michael Duffy*	5	February 2026
2nd	Richie Towell	5	November 2015
2nd	Paul Doolin	5	January 2001
2nd	Paul McGee	5	February 1998
3rd	Aidan Keena*	4	September 2026
3rd	Patrick Hoban	4	June 2023
3rd	Chris Forrester*	4	March/April 2021
3rd	David McMillan	4	November/December 2020
3rd	Jack Byrne*	4	September 2020
3rd	Gary Twigg	4	October 2012
3rd	Pat Morley	4	October 1999
3rd	John Caulfield	4	November 1998
4th	Padraig Amond*	3	October 2026
4th	Rory Gaffney	3	November 2025
4th	Christy Fagan	3	March 2016
4th	Danny North	3	November 2013
4th	Brian Shelley	3	August 2009
4th	Owen Heary	3	October 2008
4th	Ollie Cahill	3	July 2008
4th	Peter Hutton	3	September 2005
4th	Trevor Molloy	3	May 2004
4th	Glen Crowe	3	November 2002
4th	Denis Bonner	3	December 1990
4th	Eugene Davis	3	January 1987
4th	Pat Byrne	3	September 1986
4th	Jackie Jameson	3	December 1983
4th	Brendan Bradley	3	October 1983
4th	Mick Leech	3	December 1978
4th	Alfie Hale	3	April 1973
4th	Miah Dennehy	3	January 1972
5th	Patrick Hickey*	2	March 2026
5th	Graham Burke*	2	May 2025
5th	Darragh Markey*	2	March 2025
5th	Will Jarvis*	2	June 2024
5th	Ronan Coughlan	2	November 2023
5th	Ali Coote*	2	March 2023
5th	Aidan Keena*	2	July 2022
5th	Danny Mandroiu*	2	October 2021
5th	Georgie Kelly	2	September 2021
5th	Greg Bolger	2	May 2021
5th	Patrick McEleney	2	October 2018
5th	Chris Shields	2	September 2018
5th	Alan Bennett	2	October 2017
5th	Conor McCormack	2	April 2017
5th	Killian Brennan	2	May 2013
5th	Mark Quigley	2	August 2012
5th	Karl Sheppard	2	October 2011
5th	Raffaele Cretaro	2	October 2009
5th	Dave Mooney	2	June 2008
5th	Liam Kearney	2	August 2005
5th	George O'Callaghan	2	May 2005
5th	Richie Baker	2	March/April 2005
5th	Colin Hawkins	2	July 2003
5th	Steve Williams	2	May 2003
5th	John O'Flynn	2	April 2003
5th	Kevin Hunt	2	January 2003
5th	Stephen O'Brien	2	August 2001
5th	Mark Rutherford	2	April 2001
5th	Dessie Baker	2	March 2000
5th	Pat Fenlon	2	September 1999
5th	Paul Curran	2	March 1997
5th	Eoin Mullen	2	August 1996
5th	Stephen Geoghegan	2	February 1996
5th	Liam Coyle	2	April 1995
5th	Robbie Best	2	January 1993
5th	Dave Barry	2	September 1991
5th	Damien Byrne	2	March 1990
5th	Mark Ennis	2	September 1989
5th	Paddy Dunning	2	February 1989
5th	Larry Wyse	2	January 1989
5th	Mick Bennett	2	September 1987
5th	Noel Larkin	2	April 1987
5th	Mick Byrne	2	March 1987
5th	David Flavin	2	December 1986
5th	Barry Kehoe	2	November 1986
5th	Barry Murphy	2	March 1986
5th	Jacko McDonagh	2	October 1984
5th	Alan Campbell	2	January 1984
5th	Tommy McConville	2	April 1982
5th	Dermot Keely	2	October 1979
5th	Sean Byrne	2	April 1979
5th	Eamonn Gregg	2	April 1978
5th	Martin Donnelly	2	November 1976
5th	Donal Murphy	2	September 1974
5th	Turlough O'Connor	2	September 1973

== Awards won by position ==
As of 15 November 2026

Position	Wins
Forward	178
Midfielder	163
Defender	95
Goalkeeper	27

== Awards won by nationality ==
As of 15 November 2026

Country	Wins
Ireland	393
Northern Ireland	21
England	21
Scotland	12
Wales	4
United States	3
New Zealand	3
Cameroon	1
Barbados	1
Uganda	1
Yugoslavia	1

== Awards won by club ==
As of 15 November 2026

Club	Wins
Dundalk	56
Bohemians	56
Shamrock Rovers	48
St Patrick's Athletic	45
Cork City	40
Shelbourne	39
Sligo Rovers	28
Derry City	28
Waterford	23
Drogheda United	16
Galway United	13
Limerick	13
Finn Harps	10
UCD	9
Bray Wanderers	8
Athlone Town	8
Cork Celtic	6
Longford Town	5
Cobh Ramblers	4
Home Farm	4
Cork Hibernians	4
Cork Alberts	2
Sporting Fingal	1
Ashtown Villa	1
Kilkenny City	1
Thurles Town	1
