= 2002 FAI Cup final =

- Event: 2001–02 FAI Cup
Dundalk	Bohemians
2	1
- Date: 7 April 2002
- Venue: Tolka Park, Dublin
- Referee: Paul McKeon
- Attendance: 9,200

The 2002 FAI Cup final was the final match of the 2001–02 FAI Cup, a knock-out association football competition contested annually by clubs affiliated with the Football Association of Ireland. It took place on Sunday 7 April 2002 at Tolka Park in Dublin, and was contested by Dundalk and Bohemians. The competition was sponsored by Carlsberg. Dundalk won the match 2–1 to win the cup for the ninth time.

== Background ==
The two sides' three previous meetings that season had been in the League, with Dundalk winning the first match in Oriel Park, and the next two matches being draws. The final was played seven days after Dundalk had been relegated from the League of Ireland Premier Division, having finished 10th. To reach the final, they had defeated Galway United (1–0 in a replay after a 1–1 draw), Kilkenny City (3–2), Finn Harps (2–0 in a replay following a 1–1 draw) and Shamrock Rovers (4–0).

Bohemians were the cup holders, having won the League and Cup Double the year before. A poor start to the season had seen them finish fourth in the League in 2001–02, missing out on Europe via the League in the process. They had overcome Longford Town, Bray Wanderers and Derry City to reach the final. The winners of the final would qualify for the 2002–03 UEFA Cup qualifying round.

The match was broadcast live on RTÉ One in Ireland with commentary from George Hamilton. Highlights of the match were broadcast that evening on Sky Sports in Ireland and the United Kingdom.

== Match ==
=== Summary ===
Despite failing to beat Dundalk in three league matches, Bohemians (managed by future Dundalk manager Stephen Kenny) were the pre-match favourites. After an evenly contested opening half hour, they took control of the match and opened the scoring through right-back Tony O'Connor in the 40th minute. Garry Haylock then equalised for Dundalk, turning and firing home from a David Hoey cross a minute before half-time. Haylock then scored his second goal from a corner, four minutes after half-time, to give Dundalk a 2–1 lead. Simon Webb of Bohemians was sent off in the 74th minute for committing a professional foul after he brought down Martin Reilly as Dundalk were trying to counterattack. Dundalk controlled the remainder of the match to win the club's ninth FAI Cup - their first since 1988.

=== Details ===
7 April 2002
15:00

Dundalk	2–1	Bohemians
Haylock 44', 49'	Report	O'Connor 40'

Tolka Park, Dublin
Attendance: 9,200
Referee: Paul McKeon

Dundalk	Bohemians

GK	(Republic of Ireland) John Connolly
RB	(Republic of Ireland) John Whyte
CB	(Republic of Ireland) Donal Broughan
CB	(Republic of Ireland) Stephen McGuinness
LB	(Republic of Ireland) David Crawley (c)
RM	(Republic of Ireland) David Hoey
CM	(Republic of Ireland) Ciaran Kavanagh
CM	(Republic of Ireland) John Flanagan
LM	(Republic of Ireland) Chris Lawless	(substituted off) 72'
CF	(Republic of Ireland) Martin Reilly
CF	(England) Garry Haylock	(substituted off) 86'
Substitutes:
MF	(Republic of Ireland) Cormac McArdle	(substituted in) 72'
MF	(Republic of Ireland) Cormac Malone	(substituted in) 86'
Manager:
(Republic of Ireland) Martin Murray

GK	(Wales) Wayne Russell
RB	(Republic of Ireland) Tony O'Connor
CB	(Republic of Ireland) Colin Hawkins (c)
CB	(Republic of Ireland) Stephen Caffrey
LB	(Republic of Ireland) Simon Webb	(red card) 74'
RM	(Republic of Ireland) Fergal Harkin		(substituted off) 80'
CM	(Republic of Ireland) Kevin Hunt
CM	(England) Dave Morrisson		(substituted off) 72'
LM	(England) Mark Rutherford
CF	(Republic of Ireland) Glen Crowe
CF	(Republic of Ireland) Trevor Molloy		(substituted off) 85'
Substitutes:
MF	(England) Dave Hill		(substituted in) 72'
DF	(Republic of Ireland) Paul Byrne		(substituted in) 80'
FW	(Republic of Ireland) Gary O'Neill		(substituted in) 85'
Manager:
(Republic of Ireland) Stephen Kenny
