= Liam Coyle (footballer, born 1968) =

Northern Irish footballer

Personal information
- Full name: Liam Coyle
- Date of birth: 21 May 1968 (age 58)
- Place of birth: Derry, Northern Ireland
- Position: Forward

Youth career
- 1981–1984: Nottingham Forest

Senior career*
Years	Team	Apps	(Gls)
1986–1987	Derry City	0	(0)
1987–1988	Finn Harps	8	(3)
1988–1990	Derry City	35	(18)
1990–1991	Coleraine	1	(0)
1992–1993	Omagh Town	30	(16)
1993–1995	Derry City	68	(16)
1995–1996	Glentoran	12	(4)
1996–2003	Derry City	160	(43)
Total		314	(100)

International career
1989	Northern Ireland	1	(0)
1989–1995	League of Ireland XI	2	(1)
- * Club domestic league appearances and goals

Liam Coyle (born 21 May 1968) is a former Northern Irish footballer.

== Club career ==
Coyle made his League of Ireland debut for Finn Harps on the opening day of the 1987-88 League of Ireland First Division season at Buckley Park against EMFA on 13 September 1987. After 3 goals in 9 total appearances he moved to his home town club making his Derry debut alongside Tim Dalton, Kevin Brady, Paul Doolin and Noel Larkin at Finn Park in an Ulster Tyre Cup game on 24 July 1988. His first goal came in a friendly against Clyde F.C. on 7 August.

Liam Coyle really burst onto the League of Ireland scene during the 1988–89 League of Ireland Premier Division season scoring a hat-trick against Cobh Ramblers on his Derry League debut on 6 November. He was also crowned Young Player of the Year, finished the season as "Treble" winner with Derry, and was capped by Northern Ireland in an end-of-season friendly with Chile (following in the footsteps of his father, Fay Coyle).

After starring in a 1989-90 European Cup tie against S.L. Benfica in a league game at Dundalk in September 1989 Coyle sustained a knee injury which turned out to be a condition called osteochondritis dissecans. On doctors' advice he retired at the end of that season. His testimonial was held against Newcastle United on 8 May 1990 at the Brandywell Stadium.

However Coyle never gave up believing that he wouldn't play again. He made an abortive comeback with Coleraine in September 1990, but lasted just one match. Coyle then turned to a faith-healer, and in combination with heavy knee strapping, started playing again for Brandywell Harps where he was spotted by Omagh Town manager Roy McCreadie.

He agreed to sign for Omagh for the 1992-93 Irish League season and made his Irish League debut on 16 August at Carrick Rangers scoring in a 3–2 win.

He had an astounding season playing more games (43) than any other player and ending up with a total of 23 goals.

When McCreadie left new manager Paul Kee signed Coyle for another year but after one league game he was sold to Derry for £10,000 in August 1993, and soon enough was showing the skills and trickery that had brought him such acclaim as a youngster. Coyle scored on his 100th competitive appearance for Derry in November 1994. He added further FAI Cup and League Cup medals to his collection, and was Ireland's double player of the year in 1995.

In December 1995 Coyle moved to Glentoran in a £37,000 deal, a record between Irish clubs. Although scoring on his debut against Cliftonville F.C. he was unhappy about leaving the Brandywell behind and would later describe it as the "low point" of his career. He lasted just six months at the Oval, picking up an Irish Cup medal, before being allowed to leave. Glens' manager Tommy Cassidy put it like this, "(Coyle) is one of the most skilful Irish players in history, but he had to go – he was missing training and other players were taking note". Coyle returned to Derry City for a combined fee of £42,000 (that also included Declan Devine), and immediately helped the Candystripes to another League of Ireland title.

As the years moved on Coyle continued to regularly find the net until the injuries began to take their toll. In April 2002 he scored in the final of the FAI League Cup which Derry lost on penalties. However, in October 2002 he scored his only FAI Cup Final goal in his fifth appearance, as Derry defeated Shamrock Rovers 1–0. His last ever goal for the club proved to be even more important. In December 2003 Derry found themselves in a promotion-relegation play-off with near neighbours Finn Harps. With the game in extra-time it was the 35-year-old Coyle who came off the bench to score the winner, and maintain Derry's Premier Division status.

In January 2004, following years of playing through the pain barrier, Coyle announced his retirement from playing. He had scored a then club record 112 goals in almost 400 games for Derry (since overtaken by Mark Farren), and was acclaimed from all-quarters as the greatest player in their history. He stayed at the Brandywell as Chief Scout, and has since made clear his ambitions to one day manage the club.

== International career ==
Like his father, Fay, who also played with Derry, Coyle played internationally for Northern Ireland. He appeared in the green jersey on one occasion against Chile in 1989, although his pride on that occasion was tempered by a less than welcome reception from some Northern Ireland fans. He was quoted as saying: "While standing for the English national anthem, a section of the supporters were giving me dogs abuse, calling me a Provo and shouting 'Go back to Derry, you Fenian scum. But I never regretted playing for Northern Ireland."

== Honours ==
Derry City

- League of Ireland Premier Division: 1988–89, 1996–97
- FAI Cup: 1988–89, 1994–95, 2001–02
- League of Ireland Cup: 1988–89, 1990–91, 1991–92, 1993–94

Omagh Town

- North West Senior Cup: 1992–93

Glentoran

- Irish Cup: 1995–96

Individual

- PFAI Young Player of the Year: 1988–89
- Omagh Town Player of the Year: 1992–93
- PFAI Players' Player of the Year: 1994–95

== Bibliography ==
- Liam Coyle (10 March 2002). "Born to Play". Four Courts Press Ltd.
