= Jackie Jameson =

Irish footballer

Personal information
- Full name: John Jameson
- Date of birth: 27 March 1957
- Place of birth: Crumlin, Dublin, Ireland
- Date of death: 28 October 2002 (aged 45)
- Place of death: Dún Laoghaire, Dublin, Ireland
- Height: 6 ft 0 in (1.83 m)
- Position: Striker

Youth career
- Lourdes Celtic
- –1975: Cherry Orchard

Senior career*
| Years | Team | Apps | (Gls) |
| 1975–1978 | Shamrock Rovers | 2 | (0) |
| 1978–1981 | St. Patrick's Athletic | 68 | (17) |
| 1981–1990 | Bohemians | 205 | (70) |
| Total | | 275 | (87) |

International career
| 1986–1990 | League of Ireland XI | 1 | (0) |
- * Club domestic league appearances and goals

Jackie Jameson was an Irish association football player who played as a forward for Bohemians during the 1980s. Regarded as one of the club's greatest ever players, he was nicknamed "The Great Man" during his time at Dalymount Park.

Jameson also represented Shamrock Rovers, Dundalk (loan) and St. Patrick's Athletic during his career. Known around Dalymount Park as "The Great Man", he was inducted into the Bohemian F.C. Hall of Fame in November 2007.

== Early life ==
Jackie Jameson was born John Jameson on 27 March 1957 in Cashel Avenue, Crumlin, Dublin. He was the youngest son of John Jameson, a CIÉ employee, and Margaret Jameson (née Stephens). As a teenager he developed tetanus after cutting his leg playing football, and only the prompt action of a doctor saved his life. His recovery necessitated keeping his leg in cotton wool for twelve months.

== Club career ==
Jameson began playing schoolboy football at Lourdes Celtic and played with Cherry Orchard before moving into League of Ireland football with Shamrock Rovers in 1975.

He made a scoring debut on 21 October 1975 in a FAI League Cup tie while in the previous month on 11 September he scored against Japan in a 3–2 win in Tokyo. He struggled, however, to gain regular first team football under John Giles and after only 5 appearances he moved to St Patrick's Athletic in 1978 where he began to establish himself as a player of some class.

Jameson joined St Patrick's Athletic in February 1978. He spent three seasons at Pats, reaching the FAI Cup final in the 1979–80 season where they lost to Waterford. He left the club in 1981 having scored 17 times in 68 league appearances.

Jameson joined Billy Young's Bohemians on a free transfer in 1981. He scored on his league debut on 13 September against Sligo, the same day Paul Doolin, who also scored, made his debut. He was the top scorer at Bohemians for the next four seasons, scoring 49 goals, until the 1985–86 season when injury and illness restricted him to a handful of appearances. During this period, he collected numerous runners-up medals as Bohs finished second to league champions, Shamrock Rovers in both 1983–84 and 1984–85. Jameson was also part of the Bohs team that beat Rangers 3–2 in the UEFA Cup in 1984. He was restricted to 14 appearances in his final season, scoring three league goals in 1989–90. His last goal for Bohemians was on 14 January 1990 when he came on as a substitute to score the winner against Galway United. Jameson's final appearance for the club came two weeks later, on 28 January, in a 1–0 home reverse to UCD. After nine years at Dalymount Park, he was released in 1990 having scored 103 goals in 303 appearances for Bohemians. Jameson retired from football having scored 87 league goals across 275 league appearances during his spells at Rovers, St Pat's and Bohemians.

Jackie would end up as Bohemian's top league scorer in 5 of those seasons. He was runner up in the FAI Cup in 1982 and 1983 and runner up in the League of Ireland in 1984 and 1985. Although he was never capped at full international level, he was selected for the League of Ireland XI and was part of the squad that participated in the 1988 Olympic qualifiers. He played 303 competitive matches for Bohs after making his debut against Shelbourne on 30 August 1981 with his last game on 28 January 1990 against UCD. Scored once in six European appearances.

== Death and legacy ==
Jameson died after drowning at Dún Laoghaire on 28 October 2002. He was inducted into the Bohemians Hall of Fame in 2007 and a function room at Dalymount Park is named in his honour. A skilful forward who was considered to be one of the club's greatest players, Jameson was known for his dribbling ability and close control.

He wasn’t an out and out striker, he wasn’t a number 10, he was very hard to define. He’d dribble, he’d go at people and get the ball down, try to make things happen... play someone else in or have a go himself, he was good in the air — he was a real all rounder, a natural talent.

— Gino Lawless, Off The Ball

Jameson's reputation among Bohemians fans earned him the nickname, "The Great Man". He is still a legend amongst the Bohs fans and many songs and flags have been created in honour of him.
