= Dermot O'Neill (footballer) =

Irish goalkeeper

Personal information
- Date of birth: 27 November 1960 (age 65)
- Place of birth: Dublin, Ireland
- Position: Goalkeeper

Youth career
- 1978–1979: Shamrock Rovers

Senior career*
Years	Team	Apps	(Gls)
1979–1981	Dundalk	0	(0)
1981–1991	Bohemians	283	(0)
1991–1995	Derry City	129	(0)
1995–1999	Glenavon	118	(0)
1999–2000	Ballymena United	34	(0)
Total		564	(0)

International career
1982–1986	League of Ireland XI		
1985	Republic of Ireland U21	1	(0)
- * Club domestic league appearances and goals

Dermot "Monkey" O'Neill (born 27 November 1960) was an Irish football goalkeeper who played in the League of Ireland during the 1980s and 1990s.

== Career ==
Son of Robert who played for Shelbourne he was educated at Scoil Mhuir in Marino and Ard-Scoil Rís where he played Gaelic football and made it onto the minor Dublin county team. But football was O'Neill's first love and he signed for Shamrock Rovers youth team where his brother Alan was the first choice goalkeeper. He also won 5 caps for the Irish youth team around this time.

He then moved to Jim McLaughlin's Dundalk team where he struggled to break into the first team but at Reserve level won 2 Reserve league titles. Those performances attracted Billy Young and O'Neill was soon on his way to Bohemians where he made his League of Ireland debut, alongside Paul Doolin at Sligo on 13 September 1981, keeping a clean sheet. He would stay at "Dalyer" for the rest of the decade, missing only 1 league game between 1981 and 1988. He was to make 6 appearances in European competition for Bohs against the likes of Rangers, Dundee United and Aberdeen. He had near misses while at Dalymount Park but never managed to pick up a winners medal – winning numerous League runners-up medals and 2 FAI Cup runners up medal (1982 and 1983).

Dermot earned one cap for the Republic of Ireland U21 at Fratton Park in March 1985.

After 283 league appearances and 10 seasons at Bohs, O'Neill signed for Derry City under new manager Roy Coyle. O'Neill seemed destined to remain trophyless throughout his career when Derry lost the 1994 FAI Cup Final to Sligo Rovers and then lost the league on the last day of the 1994/95 season when Dundalk pipped Derry to the title. But one week after that league disaster, O'Neill finally got his winners medal as Derry beat Shelbourne to win the 1995 FAI Cup. It marked the end of his career at Derry as he moved on to the Irish League with Glenavon.

He made his debut at Fimleikafélag Hafnarfjarðar in the 1995–96 UEFA Cup where he saved a penalty to advance to the next round at SV Werder Bremen and won the Irish Cup in 1997 beating Cliftonville in the final. After three seasons Dermot moved on to Ballymena United under Nigel Best. He only spent one season there and after just avoiding relegation, O'Neill retired.

O'Neill got back into football in 2001 when he became goalkeeping coach at Longford Town under Stephen Kenny. When Kenny moved on to Bohemians, O'Neill returned to his footballing home and stayed there as goalkeeping coach until the summer of 2006 when under pressure boss Gareth Farrelly decided he was surplus to requirements. However, when Pat Fenlon was appointed manager of Bohs, he brought back O'Neill as goalkeeping coach for the 2008 season.

== Honours ==
Bohemians

- Leinster Senior Cup (1): 1985

Derry City

- FAI Cup (1): 1995

Glenavon

- Irish Cup (1): 1997

== Sources ==
- Dave Galvin; Gerry Desmond. Irish Football Handbook. ISBN 0-9517987-3-1.
