= Alan Byrne (footballer, born 1969) =

Irish former soccer player

Personal information
- Date of birth: 12 May 1969 (age 57)
- Place of birth: Dublin, Ireland
- Position: Midfielder

Youth career
- Lakelands

Senior career*
| Years | Team | Apps | (Gls) |
| 1987–1993 | Bohemians | 104 | (4) |
| 1993–1994 | Shamrock Rovers | 28 | (1) |
| 1994–1995 | Shelbourne | 24 | (1) |
| 1995–1998 | Linfield | 28 | (2) |
| 1998–1999 | Newry Town | 25 | (3) |
| 1999–2001 | Bray Wanderers | 16 | (1) |
| Total | | 245 | (12) |
- League of Ireland XI
- * Club domestic league appearances and goals

Alan Byrne (born 12 May 1969) is an Irish former soccer player who played during the 1980s and 1990s.

Byrne was a midfielder who represented Bohemian F.C., Shamrock Rovers, Shelbourne, Linfield F.C., Newry Town and Bray Wanderers during his career in Ireland. He made his League of Ireland debut for Bohs on 27 September 1987 in a 4-1 hammering by Rovers. During his time at Dalymount Park he won the FAI Cup in 1992. In total he played 132 games (123 plus 9 as sub) scoring 4 goals. He played in every single position while at Dalymount. On one occasion he took over in goal after Dermot O'Neill got sent off against Shamrock Rovers.

During his one season at Rovers he won the League Championship in 1994 scoring 1 goal in 28 league appearances. He was also named Player of the Year. He was awarded the Opel Player of the Month for November 1993.

In the summer of 1994, Byrne moved to Shelbourne and helped them to third in the league after a disappointing start to the season and to the FAI Cup Final. He got sent off in the UEFA Cup in August 1995. He then moved to Linfield for £28,000 in October 1995 and made a scoring debut and got sent off.

He later had a spell at Newry Town before moving to Bray Wanderers in November 1999. He scored 2 goals in a total of 22 appearances at the Carlisle Grounds. While playing for Wayside Celtic in the FAI Cup in January 2001 he got sent off for pushing the referee.

His tough tackling style and disciplinary record earned him the nickname "Psycho". His father Eamonn played for Drumcondra F.C. in the 1950s.

== Honours ==
- League of Ireland
  - Shamrock Rovers - 1994
- FAI Cup
  - Bohemians - 1992
- SRFC Player of the Year:
  - Shamrock Rovers - 1993/94
