= 1983–84 League of Ireland =

League of Ireland
- Season: 1983–84
- Champions: Shamrock Rovers (11th title)

Statistics of League of Ireland in the 1983–1984 season.

== Overview ==
It was contested by 14 teams, and Shamrock Rovers won the championship.

== Final table ==
| Pos | Team | Pld | W | D | L | GF | GA | GD | Pts | Qualification |
|---|---|---|---|---|---|---|---|---|---|---|
| 1 | Shamrock Rovers (C) | 26 | 19 | 4 | 3 | 64 | 15 | +49 | 42 | Qualification to 1984–85 European Cup |
| 2 | Bohemians | 26 | 13 | 10 | 3 | 39 | 20 | +19 | 36 | Qualification to 1984–85 UEFA Cup |
| 3 | Athlone Town | 26 | 15 | 4 | 7 | 44 | 28 | +16 | 34 | |
| 4 | Limerick City (Note: Limerick United resigned from the league and were replaced by Limerick City for the season.) | 26 | 13 | 7 | 6 | 38 | 26 | +12 | 33 | |
| 5 | Shelbourne | 26 | 9 | 10 | 7 | 41 | 34 | +7 | 28 | |
| 6 | UCD | 26 | 9 | 10 | 7 | 24 | 23 | +1 | 28 | Qualification to 1984–85 European Cup Winners' Cup (Note: UCD qualified for the 1984–85 European Cup Winners' Cup after winning the 1983–84 FAI Cup final.) |
| 7 | Dundalk | 26 | 9 | 9 | 8 | 38 | 31 | +7 | 27 | |
| 8 | Waterford United | 26 | 10 | 6 | 10 | 34 | 34 | 0 | 26 | |
| 9 | Finn Harps | 26 | 8 | 8 | 10 | 36 | 46 | −10 | 24 | |
| 10 | St Patrick's Athletic | 26 | 8 | 7 | 11 | 36 | 37 | −1 | 23 | |
| 11 | Drogheda United | 26 | 10 | 2 | 14 | 37 | 54 | −17 | 22 | |
| 12 | Galway United | 26 | 6 | 9 | 11 | 26 | 33 | −7 | 21 | |
| 13 | Home Farm | 26 | 4 | 4 | 18 | 16 | 54 | −38 | 12 | |
| 14 | Sligo Rovers | 26 | 2 | 4 | 20 | 20 | 58 | −38 | 8 | |

Source: www.rsssf.com
(C) Champions
Notes:

Cork City and Longford Town were elected to the league for next season.

== Results ==
| Home \ Away | ATH | BOH | DRO | DUN | FHA | GAL | HOM | LIM | SHM | SHE | SLI | StP | UCD | WAT |
|---|---|---|---|---|---|---|---|---|---|---|---|---|---|---|
| Athlone Town | — | 1–1 | 2–1 | 2–0 | 3–0 | 2–1 | 3–0 | 3–0 | 1–1 | 2–1 | 3–1 | 3–1 | 0–1 | 2–1 |
| Bohemians | 1–0 | — | 5–1 | 0–0 | 1–2 | 0–0 | 1–0 | 1–1 | 2–1 | 3–1 | 3–0 | 0–0 | 0–0 | 1–2 |
| Drogheda United | 1–4 | 0–1 | — | 0–3 | 2–1 | 2–1 | 3–1 | 0–1 | 0–7 | 2–2 | 1–3 | 3–1 | 1–0 | 3–1 |
| Dundalk | 0–2 | 1–1 | 3–0 | — | 1–2 | 1–0 | 3–1 | 2–2 | 0–1 | 5–3 | 4–0 | 1–2 | 0–2 | 3–2 |
| Finn Harps | 1–1 | 0–1 | 2–3 | 1–1 | — | 3–2 | 3–0 | 0–2 | 2–1 | 1–1 | 3–2 | 2–2 | 1–2 | 3–2 |
| Galway United | 0–0 | 0–1 | 2–2 | 2–1 | 3–3 | — | 1–2 | 3–0 | 0–3 | 0–2 | 1–0 | 1–3 | 0–0 | 2–0 |
| Home Farm | 2–3 | 0–3 | 0–4 | 1–1 | 0–0 | 1–1 | — | 1–2 | 0–5 | 0–5 | 2–1 | 0–4 | 0–2 | 1–3 |
| Limerick City | 1–2 | 2–0 | 2–1 | 2–2 | 0–2 | 1–0 | 2–0 | — | 0–1 | 1–1 | 4–1 | 3–2 | 2–0 | 1–0 |
| Shamrock Rovers | 4–0 | 1–1 | 2–0 | 1–1 | 5–1 | 4–1 | 1–0 | 1–1 | — | 3–1 | 5–0 | 1–0 | 2–1 | 2–0 |
| Shelbourne | 2–0 | 1–1 | 1–3 | 0–0 | 5–0 | 1–1 | 1–0 | 0–2 | 3–2 | — | 2–1 | 1–0 | 0–0 | 2–1 |
| Sligo Rovers | 1–2 | 3–4 | 2–3 | 0–2 | 2–2 | 0–2 | 0–2 | 0–4 | 0–2 | 0–0 | — | 2–1 | 0–0 | 0–2 |
| St Patrick's Athletic | 3–2 | 1–1 | 3–0 | 0–1 | 2–0 | 1–2 | 0–0 | 1–0 | 0–4 | 3–3 | 2–0 | — | 1–1 | 0–2 |
| UCD | 2–1 | 1–3 | 2–1 | 1–1 | 0–0 | 0–0 | 1–2 | 0–0 | 0–2 | 1–0 | 2–1 | 3–2 | — | 0–1 |
| Waterford United | 1–0 | 1–3 | 2–0 | 3–1 | 2–1 | 0–0 | 1–0 | 2–2 | 0–2 | 2–2 | 0–0 | 1–1 | 2–2 | — |

Legend: Blue = home team win; Yellow = draw; Red = away team win.

== Top scorers ==
| Rank | Player | Club | Goals |
|---|---|---|---|
| 1 | Alan Campbell | Shamrock Rovers | 24 |
| 2 | Brendan Bradley | Finn Harps | 16 |
| 3 | Liam Buckley | Shamrock Rovers | 14 |
| 4 | Jackie Jameson | Bohemians | 13 |
| 4 | Benny Laryea | Dundalk | 13 |
| 6 | Mick Bennett | Waterford | 12 |
| 6 | Des Kennedy | Limerick City | 12 |
| 8 | Roddy Collins | Athlone Town | 11 |
| 9 | John Delamere | Shelbourne | 10 |
| 10 | Eugene Davis | St Patrick's Athletic | 9 |
| 10 | Brian Duff | Galway United | 9 |
