= John Reynor =

Irish footballer

Personal information
- Date of birth: 25 July 1964 (age 62)
- Place of birth: Dublin, Ireland
- Position: Midfielder

Youth career
- St John Bosco

Senior career*
Years	Team	Apps	(Gls)
1981–1988	Bohemians	93	(9)
1988–1993	Monaghan United	?	(?)
1993–1994	Kilkenny City	22	(0)
- * Club domestic league appearances and goals

John Reynor (born 25 July 1964 in Dublin) was an Irish soccer player during the 1980s.

He represented Bohemians, Monaghan United, Kilkenny City amongst others during his career. He made 3 appearances for Bohs in European competition.

He was Player of the Month for December 1987.

Reynor played for the Republic of Ireland national under-19 football team in the 1982 UEFA European Under-18 Football Championship finals in Finland. In April 1983 he played for the League of Ireland XI U21s against their Italian League counterparts who included Roberto Mancini and Gianluca Vialli in their team.

His son Darragh is also a footballer. He also has two daughters and another son.
