= Donal Murphy =

Irish footballer

Personal information
- Full name: Donal Patrick Murphy
- Date of birth: 23 February 1955 (age 71)
- Place of birth: Dublin, Ireland
- Height: 5 ft 9 in (1.75 m)
- Position: Winger

Youth career
- 1970–1973: Coventry City

Senior career*
Years	Team	Apps	(Gls)
1973–1975	Shamrock Rovers	45	(17)
1975–1978	Coventry City	43	(10)
1977	→ Millwall (loan)	3	(0)
1978–1980	Torquay United	85	(20)
1980–1982	Plymouth Argyle	48	(9)
1981–1982	→ Torquay United (loan)	3	(0)
1982	Blackburn Rovers	3	(0)
1982–1983	Drogheda United	13	(1)
1983	Bohemians	6	(1)
1983–1984	Drogheda United	19	(6)
1984–1985	UCD	24	(5)
1985	Home Farm	2	(1)
1985–1986	Shelbourne	12	(0)
- * Club domestic league appearances and goals

Donal Patrick Murphy (born 23 February 1955) is an Irish footballer who played as a winger in the League of Ireland and Football League.

== Career ==
After three seasons as an apprentice at Highfield Road the Republic of Ireland national football team youth international moved to Shamrock Rovers in October 1973. He made his League of Ireland debut on 4 November at Richmond Park and scored on his home debut at Milltown the following week. His goal scoring exploits earned him the Player of the Month award in September 1974.

In February 1975 Murphy was called up to a Republic of Ireland national football team training session under Johnny Giles.

In September 1975 he was part of the Rovers squad that toured Japan.

The following month he re signed for Coventry.

After seven years in England he came home to sign for Drogheda United in October 1982 on a three-month contract and scored on his debut at Dalymount Park. At the end of his short contract he signed for Bohemians in February 1983 and scored the winner against the Hoops on his debut. His last game for Bohs was as a substitute in the 1983 FAI Cup Final.

Murphy re signed for Drogheda in July 1983 and played twice against Tottenham Hotspur in the UEFA Cup.

In July 1984 he transferred to UCD and again played twice against English opposition in European competition, this time against eventual winners Everton F.C. in the 1984–85 European Cup Winners' Cup.

Following six months at Home Farm he moved to his fifth Dublin club, Shelbourne, in August 1985 and was part of the first Shels squad ever to be relegated.

== Sources ==
- Paul Doolan; Robert Goggins. The Hoops. ISBN 0-7171-2121-6.
