= Paddy Dunning =

Irish former footballer (born 1951)

Personal information
- Full name: Patrick Dunning
- Date of birth: 19 May 1951 (age 75)

Senior career*
Years	Team	Apps	(Gls)
1970–1976	Shelbourne		
1977–1983	Dundalk		
1983–1985	UCD		
1988–1989	Drogheda United		

International career
1970	Republic of Ireland	2	(0)
- * Club domestic league appearances and goals

Paddy Dunning is an Irish former footballer who played as a defender.

He played twice for the Republic of Ireland national team in 1970 against Sweden and Italy.

He won numerous domestic honors in his League of Ireland career, including the 1984 FAI Cup, when his UCD team defeated the favorites Shamrock Rovers in a replayed final.

Dunning's domestic career began with Shelbourne, where he played in two losing FAI Cup finals in 1973 and 1975.

His most successful years were those at Dundalk when he helped them to league titles in 1979 and 1982, FAI Cup wins in 1979 and 1981 and some famous European results, including the two ties against Celtic in the 1979–80 European Cup, when Dundalk were edged out 3–2 on aggregate.
