= Liam Kelly (footballer, born 1975) =

Irish footballer

Personal information
- Date of birth: 15 September 1975 (age 51)
- Place of birth: Dublin, Ireland
- Position: Striker

Senior career*
Years	Team	Apps	(Gls)
1993–1998	Home Farm	86	(29)
1998–1999	Shelbourne	33	(2)
1999	Glentoran	7	(1)
1999–2003	St Patrick's Athletic	87	(18)
2003–2004	Shamrock Rovers	16	(1)
2005	Longford Town		(1)
- * Club domestic league appearances and goals

Liam Kelly (born 21 September 1975) is an Irish former footballer who played as a striker.

== Career ==
He began his career at Home Farm in 1993 making his League of Ireland debut on 19 September. After five years at Whitehall Kelly moved to Shelbourne in 1998.

Kelly moved to St Patrick's Athletic in December 1999.

He signed for Shamrock Rovers in March 2003 and made his debut in the first game of the season. He scored his only goal in his second appearance.

Kelly made 18 total appearances in his two seasons in the Hoops including 1 appearance in the UEFA Intertoto Cup. Before transferring to Longford soon after.

== Personal life ==
His brother Garrett played for Rovers in the mid-1990s.

== Later career ==
Kelly managed the PFAI team that took part in the FIFPro Scandinavian Tournament in Oslo, Norway on Friday 14 January 2011 .
