= Barry Murphy (footballer, born 1959) =

Irish footballer

Personal information
- Full name: Barry Murphy
- Date of birth: 1 April 1959 (age 67))
- Place of birth: Dublin, Ireland
- Height: 1.87 m (6 ft 1 1/2 in)
- Position: Centre-half

Senior career*
Years	Team	Apps	(Gls)
1977–1981	St Patrick's Athletic F.C.	93	(0)
1981–1988	Bohemians	148	(7)
1988–1991	Shamrock Rovers	91	(2)
1991–1993	Kilkenny City	50	(2)
1993–1997	Athlone Town	85	(1)

International career
1986	Republic of Ireland	1	(0)
- * Club domestic league appearances and goals

Barry Murphy (born 1 April 1959) was an Irish soccer player during the 1980s. He earned 1 cap under Jack Charlton for the Irish national team.

He represented St Patrick's Athletic, Bohemians, Shamrock Rovers F.C., Kilkenny City and Athlone Town during his career in the League of Ireland. He signed for the Gypsies in 1981/82 from St. Pats and made his debut against Sligo Rovers in September 1981. He captained Bohs in 1986/87 and made 148 league appearances (7 goals) and 6 European appearances for the club before signing for Rovers at the beginning of the 1988/89 season. Murphy scored 2 goals in 91 appearances for the Hoops.
