= Paul Curran (association footballer) =

Northern Irish footballer (born 1966)

Personal information
- Date of birth: 5 October 1966 (age 60)
- Place of birth: Derry, Northern Ireland
- Position: Defender

Senior career*
Years	Team	Apps	(Gls)
1986–1987	Finn Harps	18	(1)
1987–1999	Derry City		
1999–2003	Ards	100	(11)
2003–2004	Dundalk	?	(2)
2004–2005	Larne	?	(2)

Managerial career
- 2006–2007: Larne
- * Club domestic league appearances and goals

Paul Curran (born 5 October 1966) is a Northern Irish football manager and former player. Throughout his playing career, Curran represented several clubs, including Ards F.C., Finn Harps, Derry City, and Dundalk

== Playing career ==
=== Finn Harps ===
During the 1986–87 League of Ireland First Division season, Curran made 26 appearances for Finn Harps.

=== Derry City ===
Later, he served as the captain of Derry City F.C., where he participated in the team's treble-winning 1988–1989 season. Curran scored twice as the League of Ireland XI beat the Welsh Football League 2–0 in Porthmadog in October 1994.

His 500th career appearance came on 1 February 1999 against Finn Harps - his only former team. He would score a goal in the game. Curran holds the record for the second-highest number of appearances for Derry City ever, a total of 512. He would make his final appearance for Derry City at the end of 1999.

=== Ards ===
Curran would sign go on to sign a 3 year contract with Ards in November 1999.

Curran debuted for Ards on 13 November 1999 against Larne in a 2-2 draw. He would go on to score 12 goals across 122 appearances for the club.

His last appearance for the club came on 29 October 2002 at Windsor Park during a County Antrim Shield match.

=== Dundalk ===
In 2003, Curran gained managerial experience with Dundalk, where he was assistant manager to Trevor Anderson and also had a short spell as caretaker manager.

=== Larne ===
In mid-2004, Curran signed for Larne F.C. He would go on to Captain the Inver Park side in the 2005 Irish Cup final.

On 26 November 2006, Curran was appointed as the club's manager.

== Personal life ==
As of 2022, his son Ryan Curran plays for Cliftonville F.C. in the NIFL Premiership.

== Honours ==
Derry City

- League of Ireland Premier Division: 1988–89, 1996–97
- FAI Cup: 1989, 1995
- League of Ireland Cup: 1988–89, 1990–91, 1991–92, 1993–94
