= Mark Rutherford (footballer) =

English footballer (born 1972)

Personal information
- Full name: Mark Robin Rutherford
- Date of birth: 25 March 1972 (age 54)
- Place of birth: Birmingham, England
- Height: 5 ft 11 in (1.80 m)
- Position: Midfielder

Senior career*
Years	Team	Apps	(Gls)
1989–1991	Birmingham City	5	(0)
1991–1993	Shelbourne	88	(10)
1993–1994	Shrewsbury Town	14	(0)
1994–1998	Shelbourne	106	(5)
1998–1999	Shrewsbury Town	3	(0)
1999–2001	Newry Town	68	(12)
2001–2003	Bohemians	74	(11)
2004–2005	Shamrock Rovers	62	(3)
2006	St. Patrick's Athletic	25	(1)
2007	Longford Town	25	(0)
2008	Shelbourne	27	(4)
Total		474	(41)

International career
- England U18
2000	Irish League representative team	1	(1)
- * Club domestic league appearances and goals

Mark Rutherford (born 25 March 1972) is an English former footballer.

== Career ==
Rutherford was once on the England under-18 squad alongside Chris Sutton, Steve McManaman and Andy Cole.

Rutherford scored the winning goal on his League of Ireland debut for Shels on 4 October 1991 at Tolka Park.

He is one of the select group of players to have played for all of Dublin's Big 4 clubs – Shelbourne, Bohemians, Shamrock Rovers, St. Patrick's Athletic. His previous clubs include Shrewsbury Town, Birmingham City F.C., Newry Town and Longford Town.

Rutherford's successful career includes 3 League of Ireland championships, 4 FAI Cups and 1 English Third Division championship. He was also an FAI Cup runner up on 5 occasions.

Rutherford scored three goals for Shelbourne in European competition. He netted against SK Brann in a 1996-97 UEFA Cup Winners' Cup tie, before scoring against Kilmarnock in the following season's competition and then against Glasgow Rangers in the 1998-99 UEFA Cup.

With Shamrock Rovers, Rutherford made a total of 69 appearances scoring 3 goals in the 2004 and 2005 seasons before moving on to his fourth Dublin club in 2006 by joining St Patrick's Athletic. Rutherford spent the 2007 season with Longford Town in a season where the midlands club suffered relegation from the Premier Division and lost 1–0 in that season's FAI Cup final to Cork City at the RDS Arena.

Rutherford departed Longford at the end of the 2007 season to rejoin former club Shelbourne on 31 January 2008 marking his third spell with the Tolka Park club. In the 2008 First Division season Rutherford made 29 league and cup appearances for Shels and scored 4 goals. His last goal in the League of Ireland was the winner at Athlone on 11 October. He finished a First Division runner-up that season as Shelbourne narrowly missed out on the title in the dying seconds of the season and Rutherford was voted the Shelbourne Supporters Development Group's (SSDG) Player of the Year for the 2008 season at the age of 36. Despite his impressive return to Shelbourne, Rutherford left the club at the end of the season and joined Leinster Senior League side Dublin Bus in 2009.

== Honours ==
Shelbourne

- League of Ireland Premier Division: 1991–92
- FAI Cup: 1993, 1996, 1997

Shrewsbury Town

- Football League Third Division: 1993–94

Bohemians

- League of Ireland Premier Division: 2000–01, 2002–03
- FAI Cup: 2001
