= Tony O'Connor (footballer) =

Irish footballer

Personal information
- Date of birth: 15 November 1966 (age 59)
- Place of birth: Dublin, Ireland
- Position: Defender

Senior career*
Years	Team	Apps	(Gls)
1986–1989	Home Farm	70	(4)
1989–1992	St. Patricks Ath	95	(12)
1992–2003	Bohemians	302	(23)
2003–2004	Dublin City	?	(0)

International career
1995	League of Ireland XI	1	(0)
- * Club domestic league appearances and goals

Tony O'Connor (born 15 November 1966) is an Irish former soccer player during the 1980s, 1990s and 2000s and is currently reserve team manager at Bohemians. He was born in Dublin and is known as "Toccy".

== Career ==
O'Connor was a defender or midfielder during his long career in the League of Ireland. He played for Home Farm, St. Patrick's Athletic, Bohemians and Dublin City.

A native of Ballymun, O'Connor began his league career at Home Farm, making his debut against Galway United in the opening game on 19 October 1986. Despite relegation for Home Farm that year, he impressed at full back. He spent 3 years at the club making 70 league appearances before Brian Kerr brought him to St Patrick's Athletic.

He made his debut against Limerick and Pats won their first League of Ireland Championship since the 1960s. After 3 seasons at Pats and 95 league appearances, he moved to Bohemians in the summer of 1992. In his first season at Dalymount, Toccy and Bohs came agonisingly close to winning the league title, losing in a 3 way play-off to Cork City. This was to become a sign of things to come as Bohs became the nearly men of the 90s, losing 4 FAI Cup semi finals in a row and finishing as runners up in the league in 1995/96 and 1996/97. Then came the 2000/01 season where Bohs done the "Double" of League of Ireland and FAI Cup. O'Connor scored the only goal in that cup final against Longford Town. He picked up another League winners medal in 2002/03 and was rewarded with a testimonial against St Patrick's Athletic on 31 January 2003. This turned out to be his last game for Bohs when after 302 league appearances and 23 goals, he left Dalymount Park to join Dublin City. He helped them win the First Division title that year and after 2 years there, he retired.

He won 3 Premier Division winners medals (2 at Bohs) and appeared in 3 consecutive FAI Cup finals, scoring in 2 of them including the winner in the 2001 final against Longford Town. One of the most popular figures in Bohs' recent history, O'Connor was inducted into the Bohemian F.C. Hall of Fame in November 2007.

In January 2008, O'Connor returned to his spiritual home of Dalymount Park to take charge of Bohemians' reserve team which will play in the "A Championship".
