= Garry Haylock =

English footballer (born 1970)

Personal information
- Full name: Garry Andrew Haylock
- Date of birth: 31 December 1970 (age 55)
- Place of birth: Bradford, England
- Position: Striker

Senior career*
Years	Team	Apps	(Gls)
1989–1992	Huddersfield Town	13	(4)
1990	→ Shelbourne (loan)	25	(18)
1991–1993	Shelbourne	54	(26)
1993–1995	Linfield	60	(36)
1995–1998	Portadown	89	(44)
1998–1999	Panionios	27	(6)
1999–2002	Shelbourne	23	(4)
2000	→ Glenavon (loan)	7	(5)
2000	→ Colchester United (loan)	0	(0)
2000–2001	→ Glenavon (loan)	21	(11)
2001	→ Glentoran (loan)	14	(7)
2002–2004	Dundalk	32	(18)
2003	→ Ards (loan)	15	(1)
2003	→ Shamrock Rovers (loan)	6	(2)
2004	Basingstoke Town	4	(0)
2005	Sutton United		
2005	Team Bath		
2005	Walton & Hersham	15	(1)
2006	Cove		
2007	Yeading	1	(0)

Managerial career
- 2006–2007: Yeading
- 2007–2011: Hayes & Yeading United
- 2011: Farnborough
- 2012: Bedfont Town
- 2015–2016: Hayes & Yeading United
- 2017: Bedfont & Feltham
- 2017–2022: King Edward's School, Witley 3rd XI
- 2022–2023: Binfield
- 2024: Windsor
- 2024: Beaconsfield Town
- * Club domestic league appearances and goals

Garry Andrew Haylock (born 31 December 1970) is an English former professional footballer. He was most recently manager of Beaconsfield Town. Gary is considered a quintessential "Journeyman" of professional football.

== Playing career ==
Haylock played for Huddersfield Town, Shelbourne, Linfield, Portadown, Panionios, Glenavon, Glentoran, Dundalk, Ards and Shamrock Rovers.

He made his League of Ireland debut on 14 January 1990, on loan from Huddersfield, and in his second game scored a hat trick.

In 1999 playing for Panionios under Ronnie Whelan he was part of the team that reached the quarter-final of the UEFA Cup Winners' Cup.

He made 30 appearances in European competition for Irish clubs, scoring in the European Cup twice. He made a scoring debut at Glentoran, Dundalk and Shamrock Rovers. He never started a game for Rovers but scored twice from six substitute appearances.

He scored the two goals for Dundalk in their FAI Cup triumph in 2002. This was his fifth Cup medal in Ireland.

== Managerial career ==
Haylock was appointed as the first manager of Hayes & Yeading United in May 2007, having previously held the post with Yeading FC from December 2006. He received the Manager of the Month Award from the Conference South for September 2008 when his team topped the Division, and again for March 2009 after another winning run as he led the club to the league play-offs and promotion to the Conference National.

Haylock resigned from his post as manager of Hayes & Yeading United on 30 May 2011. A week later Farnborough unveiled Haylock and Gareth Hall as the new management team. Just five months later Haylock and his assistant were relieved of their duties at Farnborough after a string of poor performances, including an 8–2 hammering at the hands of Truro City.

He was appointed manager at Bedfont Town on 6 January 2012 but left the club in May 2012, standing down from his roles of manager and acting chairman.

Haylock then had a spell as first team coach & analyst at League Two side Exeter City, before accepting the opportunity to return to manage Hayes & Yeading United in October 2015. He left Hayes & Yeading again in April 2016. In April 2017 he was appointed manager of Bedfont & Feltham. He left the club in October the same year.

On 27 September 2022 he was announced as manager of Binfield. He left the club on the 18 December 2023 as the club was bottom of the league.

On 9 January 2024 he was announced as the manager of Combined Counties League Division One club Windsor. He was appointed manager of Beaconsfield Town in May, but he left the club in October.
