= Billy Young (footballer) =

Irish footballer and manager (1938–2025)

Personal information
- Date of birth: 16 May 1938
- Place of birth: Dublin, Ireland
- Date of death: 17 April 2025 (aged 86)
- Place of death: Dublin, Ireland
- Position: Defender

Senior career*
Years	Team	Apps	(Gls)
1960–1969	Bohemians		

Managerial career
- 1969: Athlone Town
- 1971: Shamrock Rovers
- 1973–1989: Bohemians
- 1974: League of Ireland XI
- * Club domestic league appearances and goals

Billy Young (16 May 1938 – 17 April 2025) was an Irish soccer player and manager. He represented Bohemians with distinction for nearly 30 years as player, coach and manager and was inducted into their Hall of Fame in November 2007.

== Managerial career ==
Young managed Shamrock Rovers for six months during the 1971–72 season until his dismissal in November 1971.

He was honoured by the Football Association of Ireland in November 2008.

== Death ==
Young died on 17 April 2025, at the age of 87.
