= Alan Campbell (Irish footballer) =

Irish footballer (born 1960)

Personal information
- Full name: Alan Christopher Campbell
- Date of birth: 10 August 1960 (age 66)
- Place of birth: Dublin, Ireland
- Position: Forward

Senior career*
Years	Team	Apps	(Gls)
1978–1984	Shamrock Rovers	129	(71)
1984–1986	Racing de Santander	63	(15)
1986–1987	Logroñes	32	(9)
1987–1989	K. Berchem Sport		
1989–1990	Dundee	15	(2)
1990–1992	Forfar Athletic	20	(4)

International career
1984	League of Ireland XI	1	(0)
1985	Republic of Ireland	3	(0)
- * Club domestic league appearances and goals

Alan Christopher Campbell (born 10 August 1960) is an Irish former professional footballer who played as a forward.

He played for Shamrock Rovers, Racing de Santander, CD Logroñés, Berchem Sport, Dundee and Forfar Athletic. At international level, he made three appearances for the Republic of Ireland national team.

== Career ==
Campbell was born in Dublin, Ireland. He made his debut for Shamrock Rovers on 11 October 1978 in the Leinster Senior Cup and scored twice in a 5–1 win over St. Francis. He made his League of Ireland debut at Galway on 18 March 1979, scoring once in a 2–0 win. Campbell made four appearances in European competition, scoring once. as well as one Inter-League cap. He was also the League of Ireland top goalscorer in the 1979–80 season with 22 goals.

For Racing de Santander, he made 63 appearances, scoring 15 goals, and for CD Logroñés, he made 32 appearances, scoring nine goals.

After three years in Spain, he turned down a move to Celtic to play in Belgium in 1987.
