= Kevin Hunt (footballer, born 1975) =

English footballer

Personal information
- Date of birth: 4 July 1975 (age 51)
- Place of birth: Chatham, England
- Position: Midfielder

Senior career*
| Years | Team | Apps | (Gls) |
| 1993–1994 | Queens Park Rangers | 0 | (0) |
| 1994–1995 | Gillingham | 0 | (0) |
| 1995–1996 | Mansion (Hong Kong) | ? | (1) |
| 1996–1998 | Hong Kong Rangers | ? | (5) |
| 1998 | Geylang United | | |
| 1998–2008 | Bohemians | 282 | (21) |
- * Club domestic league appearances and goals

Kevin Hunt (born 4 July 1975) is an English former professional footballer who played as a midfielder.

== Playing career ==
Hunt started his career with Queens Park Rangers. He has also played for Gillingham, Sittingbourne, Hong Kong Rangers and in Singapore.

In December 1998, Hunt made his debut for Bohemians at Turners Cross against Cork City. Hunt quickly established himself as a dominant force in the League of Ireland, helping to steer a struggling Bohemians side away from relegation.

The following season, Bohemians came close to the league title and losing in the FAI Cup Final in a replay to Shelbourne.

The following season, 2000–01, Hunt became club captain and led Bohemians through the greatest season in its history. In the early season Bohemians progressed in the UEFA Cup, with impressive results including victories in Scotland against Aberdeen and in Germany against Kaiserslautern, before guiding the club to its first league title since 1978. One week later, Hunt led the team out in Tolka Park for the FAI Cup Final, which Bohemian won, capping a historic Double for the club.

While the 2001–02 season was disappointing for the champions, Hunt earned a runners up medal in the FAI Cup.

Hunt won his second league winners medal as Bohemians, leading the league from start to finish. He was also voted the League's Player of the Year for 2003 at the FAI's annual awards ceremony.

Kevin made 282 league appearances for Bohemian and scoring 21 goals. Kevin and his wife Faye were widely regarded as the " Posh and Becks" of Irish football.

He still occasionally appears in content on Bohemians.ie and also attends matches.

== Retirement ==
Hunt retired from football on 17 July 2008 due to family circumstances, having made a total of 364 appearances for Bohemians, scoring 22 goals in the process. A testimonial match was held for him at Dalymount Park on Sunday 12 October, featuring a Bohemians XI and an Ireland XI. The game ended in a 4–3 victory for the Bohemians XI, who were captained one last time by Kevin Hunt.

After retiring from Bohemians he joined Manchester City, working as a scout. In 2013, he was part of a mass exodus of scouts and left Manchester City FC to take up a European Scouting role for Liverpool FC.

== Honours ==
=== Club ===
Bohemians

- League of Ireland: 2000–01, 2002–03
- FAI Cup: 2001

=== Individual ===
- League of Ireland Player of the Year: 2003
