= Paul Doolin =

Irish former footballer and manager

Personal information
- Date of birth: 26 March 1963 (age 63)
- Place of birth: Dublin, Ireland
- Position: Midfielder

Senior career*
Years	Team	Apps	(Gls)
1981–1985	Bohemians	102	(26)
1985–1988	Shamrock Rovers	61	(19)
1988–1990	Derry City	63	(20)
1990–1991	Portadown	23	(2)
1991–1992	Shamrock Rovers	20	(1)
1992–1994	Shelbourne	49	(7)
1994–1995	Portadown	21	(3)
1995–1996	Derry City	41	(8)
1996–1998	Bohemians	62	(8)
1998–1999	Dundalk	12	(0)
1999–2001	Shelbourne	54	(3)
2001–2003	UCD	33	(2)

International career
1986	League of Ireland XI	1	(0)

Managerial career
- 2001–2003: UCD
- 2003–2008: Drogheda United
- 2009: Cork City
- 2010: Republic of Ireland U23
- 2010–2016: Republic of Ireland U19
- 2021: Athlone Town
- 2022: Portadown
- * Club domestic league appearances and goals

Paul Doolin (born 26 March 1963) is an Irish former footballer and manager who mostly recently managed NIFL Premiership side Portadown.

== Playing career ==
He played for Bohemians, scoring on his debut on 13 September 1981. In April 1983 he played for the League of Ireland XI U21s against their Italian League counterparts who included Roberto Mancini and Gianluca Vialli in their team.

In June 1985 he signed for Shamrock Rovers and in his three years at the club won the double twice, scoring 30 goals in 107 appearances. In his first season at Milltown, he was the club's top goalscorer with 11 goals. He made six appearances in European competition for the Hoops and played for the League of Ireland XI in 5 Olympics qualifiers.

In 1988, he joined Derry City, where he won a domestic treble in 1989. In his two seasons he scored 29 goals in 92 appearances. He then joined Portadown and became the only player to win a League and Cup double both north and south of the border.

In November 1991 he again signed for Shamrock Rovers, but this spell was less successful and Doolin left after 1 goal in 21 appearances to join Shelbourne where he won the FAI Cup in 1993. In August 1996, he had his second spell at Bohemians before moving to Dundalk and then returning to Shelbourne and helping them to the double of the league championship and FAI Cup in 2000.

== Managerial career ==
Since his retirement, Doolin has moved into management and first took the reins at UCD, but left to take over at Drogheda with the Students 11 points adrift at the bottom of the table en route to a first relegation in 15 years. At Drogheda United, he led them to a first ever FAI Cup success (2005), as well as successive Setanta Sports Cup victories in 2006 and 2007, defeating Cork City (twice) and Linfield respectively. He also led them to a first ever League title in 2007.

Having parted ways with Drogheda due to the club's precarious financial situation, Doolin joined Cork City as manager on 13 January 2009 on a two-year, full-time contract. Despite the team finishing 3rd in the 2009 League of Ireland Premier Division, Doolin resigned in November of that year, following a series of off-field financial problems at the club. In September 2010, Doolin was named as manager of the Republic of Ireland under-19 side.

On 18 August 2021, Doolin was named as manager of League of Ireland First Division club Athlone Town.

In 2022 Doolin would make his return to football management with former club Portadown in Northern Ireland. However he resigned in October.

== Sources ==
- Paul Doolan; Robert Goggins. The Hoops. ISBN 0-7171-2121-6.
- Robert Goggins. The Four-in-a-Row Story.
