= Will Fitzgerald =

Irish footballer (born 1999)

Personal information
- Full name: William Fitzgerald
- Date of birth: 19 May 1999 (age 27)
- Place of birth: Raheen, County Limerick, Ireland
- Height: 1.87 m (6 ft 2 in)
- Position: Winger

Team information
- Current team: Shamrock Rovers
- Number: 24

Youth career
- 2010–2015: Mungret Regional
- 2015: Mervue United
- 2016–2018: Limerick

Senior career*
Years	Team	Apps	(Gls)
2017–2019	Limerick	35	(0)
2019–2021	Waterford	16	(0)
2021	Derry City	35	(0)
2022–2026	Sligo Rovers	154	(10)
2026–	Shamrock Rovers	9	(0)

International career^{‡}
2019	Republic of Ireland U21	1	(0)
- * Club domestic league appearances and goals as of 17:30, 9 November 2026 (UTC) ‡ National team caps and goals as of 10:18, 29 July 2026 (UTC)

William Fitzgerald (born 19 May 1999) is an Irish professional footballer who plays as a winger for League of Ireland Premier Division club Shamrock Rovers.

== Club career ==
=== Youth career ===
A native of Raheen, County Limerick, Fitzgerald played with Mungret Regional between the ages of 11 and 15, then played League of Ireland U17 Division football with Mervue United's academy, before moving to the academy of Limerick in January 2016, where he remained until he broke into the first team.

=== Limerick ===
On 14 October 2017, Fitzgerald made his senior debut for Limerick, coming off the bench in the 74th minute of a crucial 1–0 win at home to Drogheda United in their battle against relegation. The 2018 season was his proper breakthrough season as a first team regular and it saw him make 38 appearances in all competitions but he couldn't help them avoid relegation to the League of Ireland First Division after losing 3–0 on aggregate to Finn Harps in the Promotion/Relegation Playoff. Following financial difficulties at Limerick, in June 2019 Fitzgerald was subject to interest from Premier Division clubs Derry City, St Patrick's Athletic and Waterford.

=== Waterford ===
On 5 July 2019, Fitzgerald signed for League of Ireland Premier Division club Waterford. On 11 October 2019, Fitzgerald scored the first goal of his career, in a 3–2 defeat away to Stenhousemuir in the Scottish Challenge Cup. That proved to be his only goal for the club in 21 appearances in all competitions in his two seasons with the club.

=== Derry City ===
On 22 February 2021, Fitzgerald signed for League of Ireland Premier Division club Derry City on a one-year-contract. He remained at Derry for just one season, failing to score a goal in 36 appearances in all competitions.

=== Sligo Rovers ===
Fitzgerald signed for fellow League of Ireland Premier Division club Sligo Rovers ahead of the 2022 season. On 11 March 2022, he scored the first league goal of his career, in a 3–0 win away to Drogheda United. On 11 August 2022, he scored his first European goal, scoring the only goal of the game in a victory over Norwegian side Viking in the UEFA Europa Conference League. On 9 December 2022, he signed a new one-year-contract with the club. In September 2025, Fitzgerald was subject to interest from Eerste Divisie club Roda JC, although a move never materialised with Sligo Rovers ultimately turning down their bid. Ahead of the 2026 season, he was made club captain, having previously been vice-captain to John Mahon who had departed the club. He was named League of Ireland Player of the Month for April 2026, his first time winning the award in his career.

=== Shamrock Rovers ===
On 28 July 2026, the summer transfer deadline day in the league, Fitzgerald signed for league leaders Shamrock Rovers for a fee of €75,000, a club record fee for a domestic player.

== International career ==
In February 2019, Fitzgerald was called up to Stephen Kenny's Republic of Ireland U21 side for the first time for a training camp. On 6 February 2019, he made his international debut for the U21s, replacing Zack Elbouzedi in the 86th minute of a 1–0 win over the Republic of Ireland Amateur squad in a friendly at Whitehall Stadium.

== Career statistics ==
As of match played on 30 October 2026

Appearances and goals by club, season and competition
Club	Season	League			National Cup (Note: Includes FAI Cup)		League Cup (Note: Includes League of Ireland Cup)		Europe		Other		Total	
Club	Season	Division	Apps	Goals	Apps	Goals	Apps	Goals	Apps	Goals	Apps	Goals	Apps	Goals
Limerick	2017	LOI Premier Division	2	0	1	0	0	0	–		0 (Note: Appearances in the Munster Senior Cup)	0	3	0
Limerick	2018	LOI Premier Division	32	0	3	0	1	0	–		2 (Note: Appearances in the 2018 League of Ireland Promotion/Relegation Playoffs)	0	38	0
Limerick	2019	LOI First Division	1	0	–		0	0	–		0	0	1	0
Limerick	Total		35	0	4	0	1	0	–		2	0	42	0
Waterford	2019	LOI Premier Division	6	0	2	0	0	0	–		2 (Note: Appearances in the Scottish Challenge Cup)	1	10	1
Waterford	2020	LOI Premier Division	10	0	1	0	–		–		0	0	11	0
Waterford	Total		16	0	3	0	0	0	–		2	1	21	1
Derry City	2021	LOI Premier Division	35	0	1	0	–		–		–		36	0
Sligo Rovers	2022	LOI Premier Division	35	2	1	0	–		6 (Note: Appearances in the UEFA Europa Conference League)	1	–		42	2
Sligo Rovers	2023	LOI Premier Division	28	1	0	0	–		–		–		28	1
Sligo Rovers	2024	LOI Premier Division	30	2	2	0	–		–		–		32	2
Sligo Rovers	2025	LOI Premier Division	36	0	2	0	–		–		–		38	0
Sligo Rovers	2026	LOI Premier Division	25	5	0	0	–		–		–		25	5
Sligo Rovers	Total		154	10	5	0	–		6	1	–		165	11
Shamrock Rovers	2026	LOI Premier Division	9	0	1	0	–		4 (Note: 2 appearances in the UEFA Europa League; 2 appearances in the UEFA Conference League)	0	–		14	0
Career total			249	10	14	0	1	0	10	1	4	1	278	12
