= Pico Lopes =

Irish and Cape Verdean footballer (born 1992)

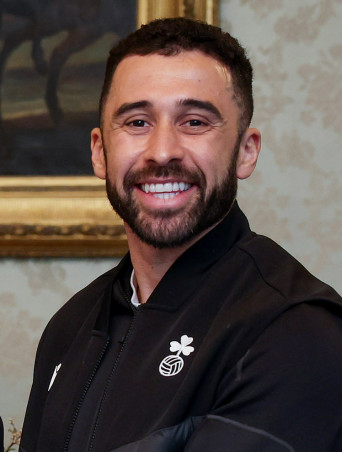
- Lopes in 2026

Personal information
- Full name: Roberto Carlos Lopes
- Date of birth: 17 June 1992 (age 34)
- Place of birth: Crumlin, Dublin, Ireland
- Height: 1.86 m (6 ft 1 in)
- Position: Centre-back

Team information
- Current team: Shamrock Rovers
- Number: 4

Youth career
- Lourdes Celtic
- Home Farm
- Belvedere
- Bohemians

Senior career*
Years	Team	Apps	(Gls)
2010–2016	Bohemians	140	(3)
2017–	Shamrock Rovers	278	(21)

International career^{‡}
2011	Republic of Ireland U19	1	(0)
2019–	Cape Verde	50	(0)
- * Club domestic league appearances and goals as of 16:59, 9 November 2026 (UTC) ‡ National team caps and goals as of 13:21, 30 September 2026 (UTC)

Roberto Carlos Lopes (Portuguese: [ʀu.ˈbɛɾ.tu ˈkaɾ.luʒ ˈlɔpɨʃ]; born 17 June 1992), also known as Pico (Kabuverdianu: [ˈpi.ku]), is a professional footballer who plays as a centre-back for Shamrock Rovers. Born in the Republic of Ireland, he plays for the Cape Verde national team.

== Early life ==
Roberto Carlos Lopes was born in Dublin. His mother Julie works as a school secretary and is originally from Terenure. His father Carlos was born in São Nicolau, one of the 10 islands that make up the archipelago of Cape Verde. Carlos previously worked as a sailor, travelling the world on commercial liners, and later became a chef. Roberto has two brothers: Christopher and Jack. The boys grew up in the family home in Crumlin. As a child, Lopes played football for Lourdes Celtic.

In Cape Verdean culture, it is common for people to have a nominho (nickname) in addition to their legal name. Lopes' nickname, Pico, was coined by his father, meaning "strong man" or "strong fella". It also makes reference to Pico do Monte Gordo, the highest peak on the island of São Nicolau.

== Club career ==
=== Bohemians ===
Lopes made his senior debut for Bohemians on 15 October 2010 as a substitute in a 1–0 defeat to eventual champions Sligo Rovers in the 2010 FAI Cup semi-final at Dalymount Park.

Lopes made his League of Ireland debut on 4 March 2011 against Bray Wanderers at the Carlisle Grounds, coming off the bench in a 3–1 win.

On 25 May 2012, Lopes scored his first goal for Bohemians in a 5–0 defeat of Drumkeen United in the second round of the 2012 FAI Cup.

Lopes was appointed as vice-captain under manager Keith Long for the 2015 season. Club captain Derek Pender suffered a season-ending leg injury against Bray Wanderers on 22 May 2015, resulting in Lopes stepping in as captain for the remainder of the season. He was voted as Bohemians' Player of the Year in 2015.

Lopes won his first senior trophy on 29 August 2016, captaining the club on the night and scoring twice as Bohemians defeated Wexford Youths 4–0 in the 2016 Leinster Senior Cup Final.

Lopes' final home game for Bohemians took place on 7 October 2016, where he scored his final goal for the club in a 1–0 win over rivals Shamrock Rovers. He played his final ever game for the club away to Finn Harps on the last night of the 2016 League of Ireland season.

During his time at Bohemians, Lopes sometimes played in midfield.

While at Bohs, Lopes' father Carlos, a chef, prepared food for the team at his home and delivered it to Dalymount Park the night before matches.

=== Shamrock Rovers ===
At Bohemians, Lopes was a semi-professional athlete who concurrently worked as a bank teller in Blanchardstown. He also qualified as a mortgage advisor while juggling his football commitments. He found it challenging to work both jobs and desired to go fully professional. Former teammate Glenn Cronin, who was working as an assistant coach at Shamrock Rovers, approached Lopes regarding him joining the club on a professional contract. Following encouragement from Owen Heary, who played with both men and managed Lopes at Bohemians, Rovers signed Lopes on a free transfer in November 2016.

In 2019, he scored his first European goal with a last minute header at SK Brann.

In the next round he scored the winner against Apollon Limassol.

His first winner's medal came when he won the FAI Cup in 2019 where Rovers defeated Dundalk on penalties.

In 2020 Lopes netted his third European goal.

In 2024, he became captain of Rovers after Ronan Finn left the club. He captained them to the 2024–25 UEFA Conference League playoff round, the first time an Irish club had reached the knockout stage of a European tournament.

In 2025 he won the double as captain, Rovers' first domestic double since 1987.

== International career ==
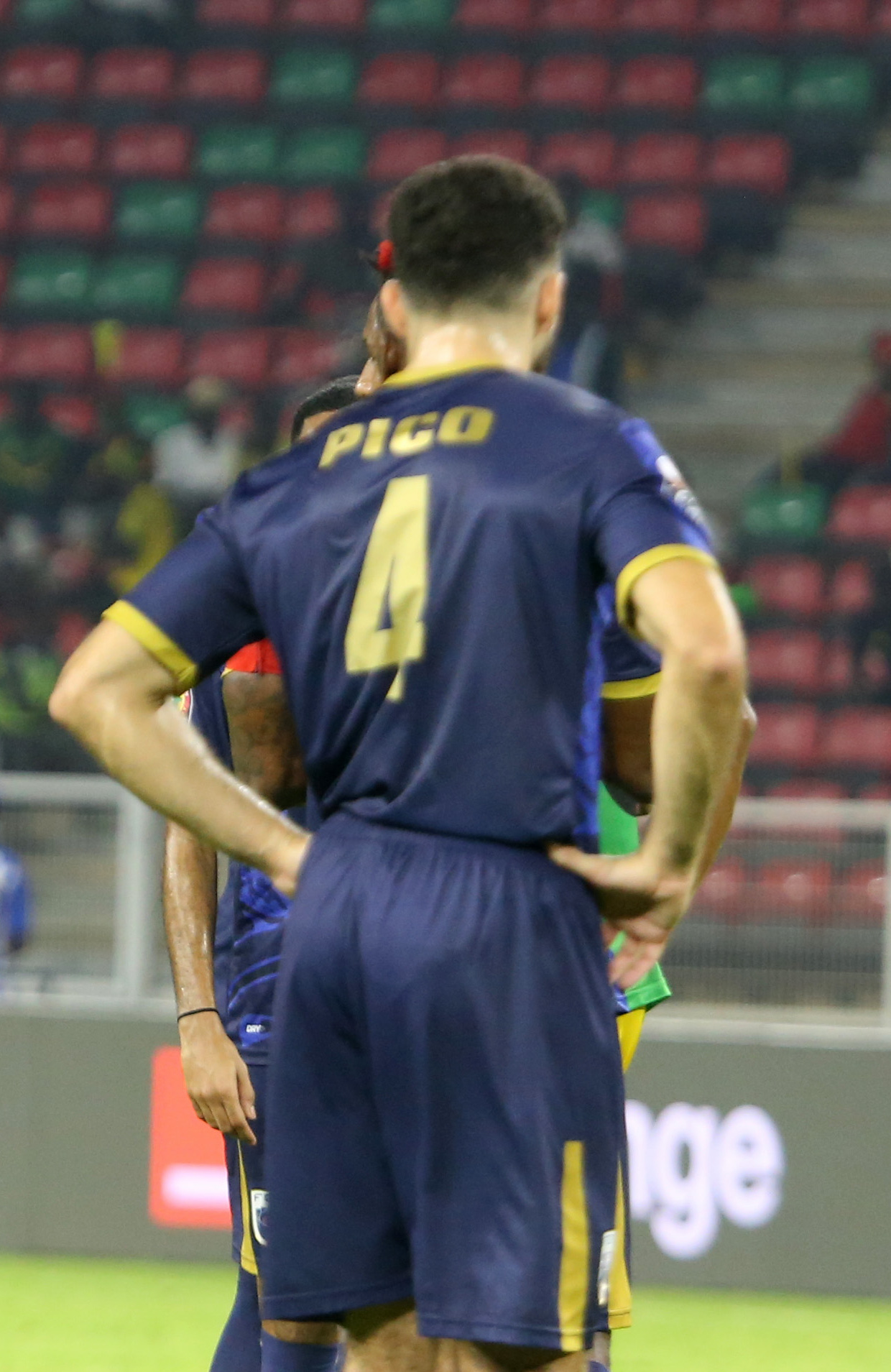
Lopes with Cape Verde at the 2021 Africa Cup of Nations

Lopes was born in Ireland to a Cape Verdean father and an Irish mother. He made one appearance for the Republic of Ireland's under-19 squad in 2011.

In 2018, Cape Verde national team coach Rui Águas became aware of Lopes' eligibility to play for the country and sent him a message on LinkedIn asking if he would like to declare. However, the message was written in Portuguese, which Lopes did not speak, and he ignored it believing it was spam. Nine months later, Águas followed up in English and Lopes, realizing his mistake, accepted the offer. He made his international debut for Cape Verde in a 2–0 friendly win over Togo in 2019.

He was included in Cape Verde's squad for the delayed 2021 Africa Cup of Nations tournament.

He was part of the Cape Verdean squad under manager Bubista in the 2023 Africa Cup of Nations tournament, where the nation reached the quarterfinals.

In October 2025, he was part of the Cape Verdean team that qualified for the 2026 FIFA World Cup after a 3–0 win against Eswatini. In doing so, he became the second current League of Ireland player to qualify for the World Cup, a day after St Patrick's Athletic goalkeeper Joseph Anang was part of the Ghana squad that qualified. He was included in the squad announced for the tournament in May 2026.

On 15 June 2026, Lopes made his World Cup debut in Cape Verde's opening group game against Spain, keeping a clean sheet in a shock 0–0 draw with the eventual champions

== Career statistics ==
=== Club ===
As of match played on 30 October 2026

Appearances and goals by club, season and competition
Club	Season	League			FAI Cup		League of Ireland Cup		Europe		Other		Total	
Club	Season	Division	Apps	Goals	Apps	Goals	Apps	Goals	Apps	Goals	Apps	Goals	Apps	Goals
Bohemians	2010	LOI Premier Division	0	0	1	0	0	0	0 (Note: Appearance(s) in the UEFA Champions League)	0	0 (Note: Appearance(s) in the Setanta Sports Cup & Leinster Senior Cup)	0	1	0
Bohemians	2011	LOI Premier Division	3	0	0	0	1	0	0 (Note: Appearance(s) in the UEFA Europa League)	0	4 (Note: 3 appearances in the Leinster Senior Cup; 1 appearance in the Setanta Sports Cup)	0	8	0
Bohemians	2012	LOI Premier Division	15	0	3	1	0	0	0	0	3 (Note: Appearance(s) in the Setanta Sports Cup)	0	21	1
Bohemians	2013	LOI Premier Division	30	1	1	0	3	0	—		0 (Note: Appearance(s) in the Leinster Senior Cup)	0	34	1
Bohemians	2014	LOI Premier Division	30	0	3	0	3	0	—		1	0	37	0
Bohemians	2015	LOI Premier Division	31	0	2	0	2	0	—		2	0	37	0
Bohemians	2016	LOI Premier Division	31	2	2	0	2	0	—		3	2	38	4
Bohemians	Total		140	3	12	1	11	0	0	0	13	2	176	6
Shamrock Rovers	2017	LOI Premier Division	25	1	4	0	3	0	4	0	0	0	35	1
Shamrock Rovers	2018	LOI Premier Division	29	4	1	0	0	0	2	0	0	0	32	4
Shamrock Rovers	2019	LOI Premier Division	35	3	5	0	1	0	4	2	0	0	45	5
Shamrock Rovers	2020	LOI Premier Division	15	3	3	1	—		2	1	—		21	5
Shamrock Rovers	2021	LOI Premier Division	27	1	2	0	—		6 (Note: 2 appearances in the UEFA Champions League; 4 appearances in the UEFA Europa Conference League)	0	1 (Note: Appearance in the President of Ireland's Cup)	0	36	1
Shamrock Rovers	2022	LOI Premier Division	27	1	0	0	—		7 (Note: 3 appearances in the UEFA Champions League; 4 appearances in the UEFA Europa Conference League)	0	0	0	34	1
Shamrock Rovers	2023	LOI Premier Division	31	2	1	0	—		4 (Note: 2 appearances in the UEFA Champions League; 2 appearances in the UEFA Europa Conference League)	0	1	0	37	2
Shamrock Rovers	2024	LOI Premier Division	33	1	1	0	—		14 (Note: 4 appearances in the UEFA Champions League; 4 appearances in the UEFA Europa League; 6 appearances in the UEFA Conference League)	0	0	0	48	1
Shamrock Rovers	2025	LOI Premier Division	34	2	4	0	—		14 (Note: 2 appearances in the 2024–25 UEFA Conference League campaign; 12 appearances in the 2025–26 UEFA Conference League campaign)	0	0	0	52	2
Shamrock Rovers	2026	LOI Premier Division	22	3	1	0	—		7 (Note: 3 appearances in the UEFA Champions League; 2 appearances, 1 goal in the UEFA Europa League; 2 appearances in the UEFA Conference League)	1	1	0	31	4
Shamrock Rovers	Total		278	21	22	1	4	0	64	4	3	0	368	26
Career total			418	24	34	2	15	0	64	4	16	2	544	32

=== International ===
As of matches played 25 September 2026

Appearances and goals by national team and year
National team	Year	Apps	Goals
Cape Verde	2019	1	0
Cape Verde	2020	0	0
Cape Verde	2021	7	0
Cape Verde	2022	7	0
Cape Verde	2023	8	0
Cape Verde	2024	13	0
Cape Verde	2025	6	0
Cape Verde	2026	8	0
Total		50	0

== Honours ==
Bohemians

- Leinster Senior Cup: 2016

Shamrock Rovers

- League of Ireland Premier Division: 2020, 2021, 2022, 2023, 2025, 2026
- FAI Cup: 2019, 2025
- President of Ireland's Cup: 2022

Individual

- PFAI Team of the Year: 2020, 2021, 2023, 2025, 2026
