= Edward McGinty =

Footballer (born 1999)

Personal information
- Full name: Edward Joseph McGinty
- Date of birth: 5 August 1999 (age 27)
- Place of birth: Motherwell, Scotland
- Height: 6 ft 3 in (1.91 m)
- Position: Goalkeeper

Team information
- Current team: Shamrock Rovers
- Number: 1

Youth career
- Celtic
- Hibernian
- 2016–2017: Sligo Rovers

Senior career*
Years	Team	Apps	(Gls)
2017–2022	Sligo Rovers	97	(0)
2022–2025	Oxford United	3	(0)
2024	→ Sligo Rovers (loan)	36	(0)
2025–	Shamrock Rovers	70	(0)

International career
2018	Republic of Ireland U19		
2020	Republic of Ireland U21	2	(0)
- * Club domestic league appearances and goals as of 16:50, 9 November 2026 (UTC)

Edward Joseph McGinty (born 5 August 1999) is a professional footballer who plays as a goalkeeper for League of Ireland Premier Division club Shamrock Rovers. Born in Scotland, he represented the Republic of Ireland at youth international level.

== Club career ==
Born in Motherwell, McGinty played youth football in his native Scotland for Celtic and Hibernian before joining Irish club Sligo Rovers in 2016.

He moved to English club Oxford United in July 2022 on a three-year contract. He made his debut for Oxford on 9 August 2022 in an EFL Cup win over Championship side Swansea City, making a crucial save in the penalty shootout to help his side to the win. He made his Football League debut in a 3–0 defeat on 26 December 2022 against Ipswich Town. On 24 January 2024 he was loaned back to Sligo Rovers.

On 9 January 2025, McGinty signed for League of Ireland Premier Division club Shamrock Rovers on a multi-year contract for an undisclosed fee.

== International career ==
McGinty was born in Scotland to Irish parents, and holds dual citizenship. He is an Ireland youth international. On 16 November 2020, he made his Republic of Ireland under-21 debut against Iceland in a Under-21 European Championship qualifier, but they were beaten 2–1.

== Career statistics ==
As of match played on 30 October 2026

Club	Season	League			National Cup (Note: Includes FAI Cup & FA Cup)		League Cup (Note: Includes League of Ireland Cup & EFL Cup)		Europe		Other		Total	
Club	Season	Division	Apps	Goals	Apps	Goals	Apps	Goals	Apps	Goals	Apps	Goals	Apps	Goals
Sligo Rovers	2017	League of Ireland Premier Division	1	0	0	0	0	0	–		0	0	1	0
Sligo Rovers	2018	League of Ireland Premier Division	5	0	0	0	0	0	–		1 (Note: Appearance in the Scottish Challenge Cup)	0	6	0
Sligo Rovers	2019	League of Ireland Premier Division	21	0	2	0	0	0	–		—		23	0
Sligo Rovers	2020	League of Ireland Premier Division	18	0	3	0	–		—		—		21	0
Sligo Rovers	2021	League of Ireland Premier Division	33	0	0	0	—		0	0	—		33	0
Sligo Rovers	2022	League of Ireland Premier Division	19	0	–		—		2 (Note: Appearances in the UEFA Europa Conference League)	0	–		21	0
Sligo Rovers	Total		97	0	5	0	0	0	2	0	1	0	105	0
Oxford United	2022–23	League One	3	0	3	0	2	0	–		2 (Note: Appearances in the EFL Trophy)	0	10	0
Oxford United	2023–24	League One	0	0	0	0	0	0	–		0	0	0	0
Oxford United	Total		3	0	3	0	2	0	–		2	0	10	0
Sligo Rovers (loan)	2024	League of Ireland Premier Division	36	0	2	0	–		—		—		38	0
Shamrock Rovers	2025	League of Ireland Premier Division	34	0	5	0	—		14 (Note: 2 appearances in the 2024–25 UEFA Conference League campaign; 12 appearances in the 2025–26 UEFA Conference League campaign)	0	0	0	53	0
Shamrock Rovers	2026	League of Ireland Premier Division	36	0	2	0	—		8 (Note: 4 appearances in the UEFA Champions League; 2 appearances in the UEFA Europa League; 2 appearances in the UEFA Conference League)	0	1 (Note: Appearance in the President of Ireland's Cup)	0	47	0
Shamrock Rovers	Total		70	0	7	0	—		22	0	1	0	100	0
Career Total			206	0	17	0	2	0	24	0	4	0	253	0

== Honours ==
Shamrock Rovers

- League of Ireland Premier Division: 2025, 2026
- FAI Cup: 2025
