= Munster Derby =

- Location: Munster, Ireland
- Teams: Cork City and Waterford FC; Cork City and Limerick FC; Cork City and Treaty United
- First meeting: 21 October 1984 (Cork City V Limerick FC)
- Stadiums: Markets Field, Turners Cross, Waterford Regional Sports Centre

Munster Derby is the name given to a football derby contested by teams from the larger football clubs in Munster.

The term is frequently used to describe games between Cork City FC and Waterford FC, as well as games between Cork City and Limerick-based teams like Limerick FC and Treaty United. It is also occasionally used to describe games involving other Munster-based teams, including Kerry FC versus Cobh Ramblers, and between sides based in Waterford and Limerick.

== Cork v Limerick-based teams ==
Football clubs based in Cork and Limerick both have strong local support. Cork City, for example, have one of the biggest support bases in the League of Ireland, and as of early 2017 had average attendances of between four and five thousand per home game, compared to a league average of approximately 1,500.

The first Munster Derby between Cork City F.C. and Limerick F.C. was played in Turners Cross in Cork for a Premier Division league match on Sunday 21 October 1984. The game ended 0-0. Limerick then won the second derby on Sunday 3 February 1985, 3-1 at Markets Field. Overall for a period of 10 years from the early 1980s to early 1990s, Limerick won more of the derby clashes. But when Limerick were relegated in 1994, they didn't meet Cork in a league match until 2010, a First Division clash on Friday 2 April 2010 at Jackman Park in Limerick. The clubs didn't meet in the league for a period, until Limerick won promotion to the Premier Division in 2012. After that, Cork had the advantage in derby results - although Limerick won several derby fixtures, including when relegation-fighting Limerick travelled to title-challengers Cork, and came out 3-2 winners. This result contributed to Dundalk FC's title win in the 2015 Premier Division.

Following the liquidation of Limerick F.C. in 2019, and the formation of Treaty United in its place in Limerick, the first meeting of Treaty United and Cork City (in the 2021 League of Ireland First Division) was billed as a "Munster derby". As of 2025, Treaty United and Cork City had met 11 times, all in League of Ireland First Division games, with both teams recording three wins each (and five draws).

=== Cork v Limerick results ===
==== League results (2010 - 2019) ====
Season	Date	Home team	Result	Away team	Stadium
2010	2 April	Limerick FC	1 – 3	Cork City FORAS	Jackman Park
2010	25 June	Cork City FORAS	1 – 2	Limerick FC	Turners Cross
2010	17 September	Limerick FC	1 – 3	Cork City FORAS	Jackman Park
2011	18 March	Cork City	1 – 0	Limerick FC	Turners Cross
2011	30 May	Limerick FC	0 – 0	Cork City	Jackman Park
2011	3 September	Cork City	3 – 3	Limerick FC	Turners Cross
2013	10 March	Limerick FC	0 – 0	Cork City	Thomond Park
2013	6 May	Cork City	2 – 3	Limerick FC	Turners Cross
2013	2 August	Limerick FC	2 – 1	Cork City	Thomond Park
2014	20 May	Limerick FC	1 – 2	Cork City	Thomond Park
2014	27 June	Cork City	3 – 0	Limerick FC	Turners Cross
2014	21 September	Limerick FC	0 – 1	Cork City	Thomond Park
2015	13 March	Cork City	5 – 0	Limerick FC	Turners Cross
2015	16 May	Limerick FC	0 – 1	Cork City	Jackman Park
2015	14 August	Cork City	2 – 3	Limerick FC	Turners Cross
2017	31 March	Limerick FC	0 – 3	Cork City	Markets Field
2017	16 June	Cork City	4 – 1	Limerick FC	Turners Cross
2017	22 September	Limerick FC	2 – 1	Cork City	Markets Field
2018	16 March	Limerick FC	1 – 1	Cork City	Markets Field
2018	5 May	Cork City	2 – 1	Limerick FC	Turners Cross
2018	21 May	Limerick FC	0 – 2	Cork City	Markets Field
2018	12 October	Cork City	3 – 0	Limerick FC	Turners Cross

==== Cup competition (2008 - 2019) ====
Season	Date	Home team	Result	Away team	Stadium	Competition
2008	29 April	Cork City	3 – 0	Limerick 37'	Turners Cross	League of Ireland Cup
2008	6 June	Limerick 37'	0 – 2	Cork City	Jackman Park	FAI Cup
2010	11 May	Cork City FORAS	0 – 3	Limerick FC	Turners Cross	League of Ireland Cup
2012	9 April	Limerick FC	3 – 0	Cork City	Jackman Park	League of Ireland Cup
2012	7 May	Limerick FC	1 – 0	Cork City	Jackman Park	Munster Senior Cup
2014	10 March	Cork City	4 – 0	Limerick FC	Turners Cross	League of Ireland Cup
2015	28 February	Limerick FC	3 – 3 (AET) PENS 8 – 7	Cork City	Askeaton	Munster Senior Cup
2017	17 April	Limerick FC	0 – 3	Cork City	Markets Field	League of Ireland Cup
2017	29 September	Cork City	1 – 0	Limerick FC	Turners Cross	FAI Cup

==== Cork v Limerick statistics (2008 to 2019) ====
Competition	Limerick wins	Draws	Cork City wins
League of Ireland	5	4	13
FAI Cup	0	0	2
League of Ireland Cup	2	0	3
Munster Senior Cup	2	0	0
Overall	9	4	18

== Cork v Waterford ==
Several derby clashes between Cork City and Waterford were contested in the 2000s - when Cork and Waterford were in the Premier Division and then again when Cork City Foras entered the First Division with Waterford in the early 2010s. Derby games between Cork and Waterford significantly declined when Cork City started challenging the top of the table in the Premier Division and Waterford dropped to the bottom end of the First Division around 2014. When the clubs would draw each other in the cups, Waterford would usually be beaten. When Waterford played Cork in Turners Cross in the EA Sports Cup in 2016 they were beaten 7-0. However the rivalry was rekindled in 2017 after a heavy challenge by Waterford's Patrick McClean on Cork's Sean Maguire caused controversy, it led to a dispute on social media between Waterford and Cork players with Irish internationals James McClean and Shane Duffy also getting involved. A move by Waterford-born Cork centre back Kenny Browne caused some controversy with Cork manager John Caulfield in 2017. Both clubs competed in the 2018, 2019 and 2020 League of Ireland Premier Division seasons. Both Cork City and Waterford United played in the 2022 League of Ireland First Division, with several "Munster Derby" meetings that season. The two clubs met again in the 2025 League of Ireland Premier Division.

=== Cork v Waterford results ===
==== League results (2005 to 2025) ====
Season	Date	Home team	Result	Away team
2025	29 Aug 2025	Cork City	2 - 0	Waterford
2025	11 Jul 2025	Waterford	2 - 0	Cork City
2025	21 Apr 2025	Cork City	2 - 1	Waterford
2025	3 Mar 2025	Waterford	2 - 1	Cork City
2022	9 Sep 2022	Waterford	1 - 2	Cork City
2022	15 Aug 2022	Cork City	0 - 0	Waterford
2022	18 Apr 2022	Waterford	1 - 2	Cork City
2022	14 Mar 2022	Cork City	2 - 0	Waterford
2020	17 Oct 2020	Cork City	0 - 0	Waterford
2020	8 Aug 2020	Waterford	0 - 0	Cork City
2019	2 Sep 2019	Cork City	1 - 2	Waterford
2019	16 Aug 2019	Waterford	1 - 2	Cork City
2019	19 Apr 2019	Waterford	2 - 0	Cork City
2019	22 Feb 2019	Cork City	0 - 2	Waterford
2018	3 Aug 2018	Waterford	1 - 2	Cork City
2018	1 Jun 2018	Cork City	3 - 0	Waterford
2018	6 Apr 2018	Waterford	2 - 1	Cork City
2018	23 Feb 2018	Cork City	2 - 0	Waterford
2011	20 Sep 2011	Waterford	1 - 3	Cork City
2011	24 Jun 2011	Cork City	2 - 3	Waterford
2011	8 Apr 2011	Waterford	1 - 2	Cork City
2010	20 Aug 2010	Cork City	0 - 1	Waterford
2010	21 May 2010	Waterford	1 - 1	Cork City
2010	12 Mar 2010	Cork City	0 - 2	Waterford
2007	24 Aug 2007	Waterford	0 - 3	Cork City
2007	17 Jul 2007	Cork City	2 - 0	Waterford
2006	3 Nov 2006	Cork City	4 - 1	Waterford
2006	5 Aug 2006	Waterford	0 - 0	Cork City
2006	5 May 2006	Cork City	2 - 0	Waterford
2005	5 Aug 2005	Cork City	1 - 1	Waterford

==== Cork v Waterford statistics (2005 to 2025) ====
Competition	Cork City wins	Draws	Waterford wins
League of Ireland	15	6	9

== See also ==
- Derbies in the League of Ireland
