= Michael Duffy (footballer) =

Irish footballer (born 1994)

Personal information
- Date of birth: 28 July 1994 (age 32)
- Place of birth: Derry, Northern Ireland
- Position: Winger

Team information
- Current team: Derry City
- Number: 7

Youth career
- Derry City

Senior career*
Years	Team	Apps	(Gls)
2012–2015	Derry City	57	(13)
2015–2017	Celtic	0	(0)
2015–2016	→ Alloa Athletic (loan)	34	(3)
2016–2017	→ Dundee (loan)	8	(0)
2017–2021	Dundalk	152	(41)
2022–	Derry City	129	(39)

International career^{‡}
- Northern Ireland U17
2012	Republic of Ireland U18	1	(0)
2012–2013	Northern Ireland U19	3	(1)
2014–2016	Northern Ireland U21	9	(0)
- * Club domestic league appearances and goals as of 17:57, 22 August 2026 (UTC) ‡ National team caps and goals as of 21:34, 11 October 2016 (UTC)

Michael Duffy (born 28 July 1994) is an Irish footballer who plays for League of Ireland Premier Division side Derry City. His previous clubs include Celtic, Alloa Athletic, Dundee & Dundalk.

== Club career ==
=== Derry City ===
Duffy is a product of the Derry City youth team and made his first appearance for the senior team at Richmond Park on 3 September 2012 as a second-half substitute in a 3–0 defeat to St Patrick's Athletic. Duffy scored his first league goal in the 1–0 win away to Shelbourne on 8 June 2013. As a 19-year-old Duffy scored against Aberystwyth Town and Shakhtyor Soligorsk in the Europa League and netted a hat-trick in July on his 20th birthday in a league match against UCD. In October 2014 it was reported that he had signed a two-year contract extension with the club.

=== Celtic ===
In February 2015 he was transferred to Scottish club Celtic. Duffy has not played in the first team for Celtic but impressed in the Development squad.

In July 2015, he was loaned to Alloa Athletic on a six-month deal. At the start of 2016, Duffy was reported to be extending his stay at Alloa until the end of the 2015–16 season. On 27 February 2016, Duffy scored his first goal for Alloa in a 3–1 home loss to Livingston. Duffy went on to score the only goal in a 1–0 win against Hibs and was also on target in a 1–1 draw with Rangers. Duffy was named as Alloa Advertiser Player of the Year.

On 30 June 2016, Duffy moved on loan to Dundee.

=== Dundalk ===
Duffy signed for League of Ireland Premier Division champions Dundalk in January 2017. He was part of the team that won the League of Ireland Cup in September, but he missed the crucial penalty in their shoot-out defeat to Cork City in the 2017 FAI Cup Final in November. The following season Duffy was a near ever-present in the side that won the 2018 League and FAI Cup Double and Duffy was subsequently honoured by his fellow professionals by being awarded the PFAI Players' Player of the Year award. He also played regularly in the 2020–21 UEFA Europa League group stage.

=== Return to Derry City ===
On 29 September 2021, Derry City announced that Duffy would be returning to his hometown club after signing a 4 year contract on a pre-contract agreement set to begin after the end of the 2021 season. Duffy made his second debut for the club on 14 March 2022, coming off the bench in a 2–0 win at home to Drogheda United but unfortunately had to be substituted off after fracturing his tibia. He did not return until 5 August when he came off the bench to play 13 minutes against his former club Dundalk. He helped Derry City to win the FAI Cup in his first season back at the club.

In the 2023 season, his second season back at the club, he scored the tie winning goal in the 2nd qualifying round of the 2023-24 UEFA Europa Conference League against KuPS to take Derry City to the 3rd qualifying round of any European cup for only the second time in the club's history.

He was named League of Ireland Player of the Month for the 4th time in his career, for the month of June 2025. On 29 September 2025, he signed a new contract with the club until the end of 2028. On 22 November 2025, he was named PFAI Players' Player of the Year for 2025, his second time being voted by his fellow professionals as the winner of the award.

On 8 November 2026, he captained his side to a 1–0 win over Waterford in the 2026 FAI Cup final at the Aviva Stadium.

== International career ==
On the 26 August 2018 it was reported that he intended to make the switch from playing for Northern Ireland to the Republic of Ireland. Michael Duffy was called up to the Home-Based Republic of Ireland under-18 by Paul Doolin on 1 February 2012 for a friendly game against Wales. On 15 February, he played the entire game in a 2–1 defeat at Ferrycarrig Park, Wexford. Duffy has since represented Northern Ireland at under-19 and under-21 level. He made his debut for the under-21 team on 9 September 2014 in a 4–1 defeat against Serbia at Shamrock Park, Portadown. On 24 August 2016 Duffy received his first call up to the senior Northern Ireland squad by manager Michael O'Neill. In August 2018 Duffy stated his intention of playing for the Republic of Ireland. In November 2020, Duffy's former manager Stephen Kenny revealed that Duffy would have made his most recent Republic of Ireland senior squad, but his international clearance had still not come through despite an 18 month wait. On 6 February 2021, Duffy's transfer of eligibility from Northern Ireland to the Republic of Ireland was officially approved by FIFA after a 2 year wait.

== Career statistics ==
As of match played on 8 November 2026

Club	Division	Season	League		National Cup (Note: Includes FAI Cup & Scottish Cup)		League Cup (Note: Includes League of Ireland Cup & Scottish League Cup)		Europe		Other		Total	
Club	Division	Season	Apps	Goals	Apps	Goals	Apps	Goals	Apps	Goals	Apps	Goals	Apps	Goals
Derry City	LOI Premier Division	2012	5	0	0	0	0	0	—		0	0	5	0
Derry City	LOI Premier Division	2013	23	2	4	0	3	2	2 (Note: Appearances in UEFA Europa League)	0	0	0	32	4
Derry City	LOI Premier Division	2014	29	11	7	3	1	0	4	2	—		41	16
Derry City	Total		57	13	11	3	4	2	6	2	0	0	78	20
Celtic	Scottish Premiership	2014–15	0	0	0	0	0	0	0	0	—		0	0
Celtic	Scottish Premiership	2015–16	0	0	0	0	0	0	0	0	—		0	0
Celtic	Scottish Premiership	2016–17	0	0	0	0	0	0	0	0	—		0	0
Celtic	Total		0	0	0	0	0	0	0	0	0	0	0	0
Alloa Athletic (loan)	Scottish Championship	2015–16	34	3	1	0	1	0	—		2 (Note: Appearances in Scottish Challenge Cup)	0	38	3
Dundee (loan)	Scottish Premiership	2016–17	8	0	1	0	4	1	—		—		13	1
Dundalk	LOI Premier Division	2017	32	8	6	2	3	0	2 (Note: Appearances in UEFA Champions League)	0	1 (Note: Appearances in President of Ireland's Cup)	0	44	10
Dundalk	LOI Premier Division	2018	36	13	5	0	0	0	4	1	1	0	46	13
Dundalk	LOI Premier Division	2019	34	12	5	2	2	1	5 (Note: 3 appearances in UEFA Champions League, 2 appearances & 1 goal in UEFA Europa League)	1	1	0	47	16
Dundalk	LOI Premier Division	2020	16	4	5	3	—		10 (Note: 1 appearance in UEFA Champions League, 8 appearances in UEFA Europa League)	0	—		31	7
Dundalk	LOI Premier Division	2021	34	4	3	1	—		4 (Note: Appearances in UEFA Europa Conference League)	2	0	0	41	7
Dundalk	Total		152	41	24	8	5	1	25	4	3	0	209	54
Derry City	LOI Premier Division	2022	13	3	5	0	—		1	0	—		19	3
Derry City	LOI Premier Division	2023	22	7	2	1	—		6	1	1	1	31	10
Derry City	LOI Premier Division	2024	31	5	5	4	—		2 (Note: Appearances in UEFA Conference League)	0	—		38	9
Derry City	LOI Premier Division	2025	36	12	2	1	—		—		—		38	13
Derry City	LOI Premier Division	2026	27	12	4	5	—		4	0	1	0	37	17
Derry City	Total		129	39	18	11	—		13	1	2	1	162	52
Derry City Total			186	52	29	14	4	2	19	3	2	1	240	72
Career total			380	96	55	22	14	4	44	7	7	1	500	130

== Honours ==
=== Club ===
Dundalk

- League of Ireland Premier Division (2): 2018, 2019
- FAI Cup (2): 2018, 2020
- League of Ireland Cup (2): 2017, 2019
- President of Ireland's Cup (2): 2019, 2021

Derry City

- FAI Cup (3): 2012, 2022, 2026
- President of Ireland's Cup (2): 2023, 2026

=== Individual ===
- PFAI Players' Player of the Year (2): 2018, 2025
- League of Ireland Player of the Month (5): April 2018, August 2018, September 2019, June 2025, February 2026
- PFAI Premier Division Team of the Year (6): 2018, 2019, 2020, 2024, 2025, 2026
