= John Mahon (Irish footballer) =

Irish footballer

Personal information
- Full name: John Mahon
- Date of birth: 26 November 1999 (age 26)
- Place of birth: Sligo, Ireland
- Height: 6 ft 2 in (1.88 m)
- Position: Defender

Team information
- Current team: Waterford
- Number: 5

Youth career
- 2008–2015: Ballisodare United
- 2015–2017: Sligo Rovers

Senior career*
Years	Team	Apps	(Gls)
2017–2022	Sligo Rovers	89	(2)
2022–2023	St Johnstone	3	(0)
2023–2025	Sligo Rovers	50	(1)
2026–	Waterford	34	(5)
- * Club domestic league appearances and goals as of 11:47, 9 November 2026 (UTC)

John Mahon (born 26 November 1999) is an Irish professional footballer who plays as a defender for League of Ireland Premier Division club Waterford.

== Club career ==
=== Sligo Rovers ===
Mahon began playing for his local club Sligo Rovers at underage under 17 level in 2015, where he played for 2 years before progressing to the under 19 side and then the first team in 2017. He made his first team debut on 17 April 2017 in a 1–0 win away to Finn Harps in a League of Ireland Cup tie at Finn Park. That proved to be his only appearance of the season despite being named as an unused substitute in 19 league games. His League of Ireland Premier Division debut came on 21 April 2018 in a 0–0 draw with St Patrick's Athletic at The Showgrounds. In June 2018 he earned a new two-and-a-half-year contract to keep him at the club until the end of the 2020 season. Mahon scored his first goal in senior football on 26 October 2018 in a 2–0 win over Shamrock Rovers in the final game of the season. He made a total of 29 appearances during his breakthrough season, scoring 1 goal. February 2019 saw reported interest in Mahon from Scottish Premiership arch rivals Celtic and Rangers. On 2 February 2020, Mahon suffered a broken tibia in a pre-season friendly against Athlone Town. The injury kept him out of action for almost the entirety of the season but he returned to the side in October 2020 and made 5 appearances in all competitions by the season's end. Upon returning from injury in October 2020, Mahon signed a new two-year-contract with the club. On 29 October 2021, Mahon scored his first goal in just over three years when he opened the scoring in a 2–0 win over Drogheda United. On 21 December 2021, he signed a contract with to keep him at the club until the end of 2023. Upon signing his new contract, Mahon stated that he had a desire to play abroad but for now his focus was on helping his club to win trophies. The following month however, the six figure release clause in his contract was met and he departed the club. He made 102 appearances in total for Sligo Rovers during his time at the club, scoring 2 goals.

=== St Johnstone ===
Mahon signed a two-and-a-half-year deal with Scottish Premiership side St Johnstone for an undisclosed fee on 23 January 2022. He left the club only a year into his contract, with the club and player mutually agreeing to terminate his contract.

=== Return to Sligo Rovers ===
On 13 January 2023, it was announced that Mahon had returned to Sligo Rovers. In January 2024, Mahon suffered a ruptured Achilles tendon which kept him out of action until the club's final 2 league games of the season. On 15 November 2024, he signed a new contract with the club until the end of 2026. He was made club captain ahead of the 2025 season. On 3 March 2025, he scored a 78th-minute winner in a 2–1 victory over Shamrock Rovers at The Showgrounds, his first goal since 2021.

=== Waterford ===
On 27 December 2025, it was announced that Mahon had signed for League of Ireland Premier Division club Waterford. He was named League of Ireland Player of the Month for August 2026, revealing at the presentation of the award that he had considered quitting football before signing for Waterford until attending a psychologist and changing his mind. On 8 November 2026, he started in the 2026 FAI Cup final as his side were defeated 1–0 by Derry City at the Aviva Stadium. On 11 November 2026, Mahon signed a new contract with the club for 2027.

== Career statistics ==
As of match played 8 November 2026

Appearances and goals by club, season and competition
Club	Season	League			National Cup (Note: Includes FAI Cup & Scottish Cup)		League Cup (Note: Includes League of Ireland Cup & Scottish League Cup)		Other		Total	
Club	Season	Division	Apps	Goals	Apps	Goals	Apps	Goals	Apps	Goals	Apps	Goals
Sligo Rovers	2017	LOI Premier Division	0	0	0	0	1	0	0 (Note: Appearances in the Scottish Challenge Cup)	0	1	0
Sligo Rovers	2018	LOI Premier Division	24	1	1	0	2	0	2	0	29	1
Sligo Rovers	2019	LOI Premier Division	34	0	4	0	1	0	–		39	0
Sligo Rovers	2020	LOI Premier Division	3	0	2	0	–		–		5	0
Sligo Rovers	2021	LOI Premier Division	32	1	0	0	–		0 (Note: Appearances in the UEFA Europa Conference League)	0	32	1
Sligo Rovers	Total		89	2	7	0	4	0	2	0	102	2
St Johnstone	2021–22	Scottish Premiership	3	0	–		–		1 (Note: Appearances in Scottish Premiership play-offs)	0	4	0
St Johnstone	2022–23	Scottish Premiership	0	0	0	0	3	0	1	0	4	0
St Johnstone	Total		3	0	0	0	3	0	2	0	8	0
Sligo Rovers	2023	LOI Premier Division	27	0	1	0	—		—		28	0
Sligo Rovers	2024	LOI Premier Division	2	0	0	0	—		—		2	0
Sligo Rovers	2025	LOI Premier Division	21	1	0	0	—		—		21	1
Sligo Rovers	Total		50	1	1	0	—		—		51	1
Waterford	2026	LOI Premier Division	34	5	5	0	–		0 (Note: Appearances in Munster Senior Cup)	0	39	5
Career total			176	8	13	0	4	0	4	0	197	8

== Honours ==
Individual

- League of Ireland Player of the Month: August 2026
