= 2025 League of Ireland Premier Division =

41st season of the League of Ireland Premier Division

League of Ireland Premier Division
- Season: 2025
- Dates: 14 February 2025 – 1 November 2025
- Champions: Shamrock Rovers (22nd title)
- Relegated: Cork City
- Champions League: Shamrock Rovers
- Europa League: Derry City
- Conference League: Shelbourne; Bohemians
- Matches: 180
- Goals: 437 (2.43 per match)
- Top goalscorer: Pádraig Amond (14 goals)
- Biggest home win: Derry City 7–2 Waterford (4 July 2025)
- Biggest away win: Waterford 0–4 Sligo Rovers (18 April 2025)
- Highest scoring: Derry City 7–2 Waterford (4 July 2025)
- Longest winning run: 5 matches Shamrock Rovers; Shelbourne
- Longest unbeaten run: 11 matches Shamrock Rovers
- Longest winless run: 14 matches Cork City
- Longest losing run: 7 matches Waterford
- Highest attendance: 33,208; Bohemians 1–0 Shamrock Rovers (16 February 2025)
- Lowest attendance: 1,611; Cork City 1–2 Shelbourne (13 October 2025)
- Total attendance: 679,959
- Average attendance: 3,778

The 2025 League of Ireland Premier Division, known as the SSE Airtricity Men's Premier Division for sponsorship reasons, was the 41st season of the League of Ireland Premier Division, the top Irish league for association football clubs since its establishment in 1985.

The competition began on 14 February 2025 and concluded on 1 November 2025. As part of the opening weekend of fixtures, the derby between arch-rivals Bohemians and Shamrock Rovers took place at the Aviva Stadium, the national football stadium of the Republic of Ireland where a record Premier Division crowd of 33,208 was present. The 2025 season became the first year that the league is entirely made up of full-time professional clubs and players.

On 27 January 2025, it was announced that Virgin Media Television (Ireland) would become the "sole and exclusive free to air broadcaster of the SSE Airtricity Men’s Premier Division" for the next four years, pledging to show one live game from each round of the division. A new radio deal for broadcasting on Newstalk was announced just before the season started.

On 13 October, Cork City's relegation, their third of the decade, was confirmed following a 1-2 home defeat to Shelbourne in front of the division's lowest crowd of the season.

On 29 October, Shamrock Rovers won the title after a 1-0 victory over Galway United. It was their 22nd Premier Division title and their fifth in the last six seasons.

== Teams ==
The league consists of ten teams – the top nine teams from the previous season and one team promoted as champions from the First Division, Cork City. They replaced Dundalk, who were relegated after 16 consecutive seasons in the top flight.

=== Stadiums and locations ===
Locations of Premier Division teams
Locations of Dublin Premier Division teams

Team	Location	Stadium	Capacity
Bohemians	Dublin (Phibsborough)	Dalymount Park	4,500
Cork City	Cork	Turners Cross	7,485
Derry City	Derry	Ryan McBride Brandywell Stadium	6,242
Drogheda United	Drogheda	Sullivan and Lambe Park	3,500
Galway United	Galway	Eamonn Deacy Park	5,000
Shamrock Rovers	Dublin (Tallaght)	Tallaght Stadium	10,500
Shelbourne	Dublin (Drumcondra)	Tolka Park	5,750
Sligo Rovers	Sligo	The Showgrounds	3,873
St Patrick's Athletic	Dublin (Inchicore)	Richmond Park	5,500
Waterford	Waterford	RSC	5,160

=== Personnel and kits ===
Note: Flags indicate national team as has been defined under FIFA eligibility rules. Players may hold more than one non-FIFA nationality.

Team	Manager	Captain	Kit manufacturer	Shirt sponsor
Bohemians	(Republic of Ireland) Alan Reynolds	(Republic of Ireland) Keith Buckley	O'Neills	Des Kelly Interiors
Cork City	(Republic of Ireland) Gerard Nash	(Republic of Ireland) Sean Maguire	Rebel Army	Zeus Packaging
Derry City	(Northern Ireland) Tiernan Lynch	(Republic of Ireland) Mark Connolly	O'Neills	Diamond Corrugated
Drogheda United	(Republic of Ireland) Kevin Doherty	(Republic of Ireland) Ryan Brennan	Macron	NoFo Brew Co
Galway United	(Republic of Ireland) John Caulfield	(Republic of Ireland) Conor McCormack	O'Neills	Comer Property Management
Shamrock Rovers	(Republic of Ireland) Stephen Bradley	(Cape Verde) Roberto Lopes	Macron	MASCOT Workwear
Shelbourne	(Republic of Ireland) Joey O'Brien	(Republic of Ireland) Mark Coyle	O'Neills	Chadwicks
Sligo Rovers	(Republic of Ireland) John Russell	(Republic of Ireland) John Mahon	Umbro	Avant Money
St Patrick's Athletic	(Republic of Ireland) Stephen Kenny	(Republic of Ireland) Joe Redmond	Umbro	Manguard Plus
Waterford	(Republic of Ireland) Jon Daly	(Republic of Ireland) Pádraig Amond	Puma	DG Foods

=== Managerial changes ===
Team	Outgoing manager	Manner of departure	Date of vacancy	Position in the table	Incoming manager	Date of appointment
Derry City	(Northern Ireland) Ruaidhrí Higgins	Mutual consent	15 November 2024	Pre-season	(Northern Ireland) Tiernan Lynch	18 November 2024
Waterford	(Republic of Ireland) Keith Long	Sacked	19 April 2025	8th	(England) Matt Lawlor (interim)	20 April 2025
Waterford	(England) Matt Lawlor (interim)	End of interim spell	6 May 2025	8th	(England) John Coleman	3 May 2025
Cork City	(Republic of Ireland) Tim Clancy	Resigned	9 May 2025	9th	(Republic of Ireland) Liam Kearney & (Republic of Ireland) Greg Yelverton (interim)	14 May 2025
Cork City	(Republic of Ireland) Liam Kearney & (Republic of Ireland) Greg Yelverton (interim)	End of interim spell	15 May 2025	9th	(Republic of Ireland) Gerard Nash	15 May 2025
Shelbourne	(Republic of Ireland) Damien Duff	Resigned	22 June 2025	6th	(Republic of Ireland) Joey O'Brien (Note: O'Brien was initially named as interim head coach, before being appointed on a permanent basis on 3 July 2025.)	22 June 2025
Waterford	(England) John Coleman	Sacked	28 September 2025	9th	(England) Matt Lawlor (interim)	28 September 2025

== League table ==
Pos	Team	Pld	W	D	L	GF	GA	GD	Pts	Qualification or relegation
1	Shamrock Rovers (C)	36	19	9	8	56	33	+23	66	Qualification for Champions League first qualifying round
2	Derry City	36	18	9	9	52	39	+13	63	Qualification for Europa League first qualifying round (Note: Shamrock Rovers won the 2025 FAI Cup, meaning the Europa League berth went to the second place team Derry City. The two Conference League berths went to the third and fourth place teams, Shelbourne and Bohemians respectively.)
3	Shelbourne	36	15	14	7	48	37	+11	59	Qualification for Conference League second qualifying round
4	Bohemians	36	16	6	14	48	39	+9	54	Qualification for Conference League first qualifying round
5	St Patrick's Athletic	36	13	13	10	42	32	+10	52	
6	Drogheda United	36	12	15	9	38	38	0	51	
7	Sligo Rovers	36	11	8	17	42	54	−12	41	
8	Galway United	36	9	12	15	37	44	−7	39	
9	Waterford (O)	36	11	6	19	41	60	−19	39	Qualification for promotion/relegation play-off
10	Cork City (R)	36	4	12	20	33	61	−28	24	Relegation to League of Ireland First Division

Source: SSE Airtricity League, Soccerway
Rules for classification: 1) Points; 2) Goal difference; 3) Goals scored.
(C) Champions; (O) Play-off winners; (R) Relegated

== Results ==
Teams play each other four times (twice at home and twice away).

Home \ Away	BOH	DER	DRO	COR	GAL	SHM	SHE	SLI	STP	WAT
Bohemians		1–0	0–1	1–0	0–2	1–0	1–0	4–2	2–1	1–2
Bohemians		3–4	0–1	3–0	3–0	2–0	2–3	1–1	0–0	2–1
Derry City	1–0		1–3	2–1	1–1	1–2	2–0	3–0	1–0	1–2
Derry City	1–1		3–0	0–0	1–1	2–1	1–1	1–0	2–2	7–2
Drogheda United	1–0	1–1		3–2	1–1	1–2	2–2	3–0	0–0	2–0
Drogheda United	1–4	1–1		1–0	1–0	1–2	2–1	1–0	0–1	0–0
Cork City	2–1	1–2	1–1		2–2	1–1	1–1	1–1	0–2	2–1
Cork City	0–2	0–1	1–1		1–0	1–1	1–2	2–3	0–0	2–0
Galway United	1–2	2–3	2–1	2–1		0–1	1–1	0–1	2–1	1–0
Galway United	2–0	1–2	1–1	2–1		0–0	1–1	0–1	3–1	2–4
Shamrock Rovers	2–3	0–0	3–0	4–1	0–0		2–2	2–0	1–0	2–0
Shamrock Rovers	2–1	2–0	2–1	4–1	1–0		0–1	1–2	4–0	1–0
Shelbourne	1–0	3–1	0–1	1–1	2–2	1–1		3–2	2–1	0–1
Shelbourne	2–2	0–1	0–0	3–1	1–0	1–2		3–1	0–0	2–1
Sligo Rovers	0–1	0–1	2–2	1–1	1–2	2–1	1–2		0–1	2–3
Sligo Rovers	0–0	2–0	1–1	1–1	2–1	2–2	0–2		1–0	1–0
St Patrick's Athletic	3–0	2–0	0–0	3–2	2–0	2–2	0–0	4–3		2–2
St Patrick's Athletic	0–0	0–1	0–0	4–0	1–1	1–0	0–1	3–0		1–1
Waterford	0–3	2–1	2–2	2–1	1–0	1–3	0–1	0–4	1–2	
Waterford	2–1	1–2	2–0	2–0	1–1	1–2	2–2	1–2	0–2	

Source: , Extratime.ie
Legend: Blue = home team win; Yellow = draw; Red = away team win.
For upcoming matches, an "a" indicates there is an article about the rivalry between the two participants.

== Promotion/relegation play-offs ==
The ninth-placed team (Waterford F.C.) from the 2025 League of Ireland Premier Division qualified for a play-off alongside the second, third, fourth, and fifth-placed teams from the 2025 League of Ireland First Division (Cobh Ramblers, Bray Wanderers, UCD, and Treaty United).

The First Division teams contest the semi-finals and final. The semi-finals will be held over two legs, with the second-placed team facing the fifth-placed team and the third-placed team facing the fourth-placed team. The semi-final winners then contest the First Division final, with the winners ultimately facing the ninth-placed League of Ireland Premier Division team for the final place in the 2026 League of Ireland Premier Division.

=== Bracket ===
Semi-finals
4	UCD	0	2	2
3	Bray Wanderers	1	3	4
5	Treaty United (a.e.t.)	1	1	2
2	Cobh Ramblers	0	1	1

Final
3	Bray Wanderers	1
5	Treaty United	0

Promotion/relegation play-off
PD9	Waterford	2
FD3	Bray Wanderers	1

=== Semi-finals ===
24 October 2025	UCD	0–1	Bray Wanderers	Belfield
19:45		Report	Doyle 90+4'	Stadium: UCD Bowl; Attendance: 927; Referee: Lucas Keating

28 October 2025	Bray Wanderers	3–2	UCD	Bray
19:45	Cantwell 3'; Curtis 61'; Ferizaj 90+3'	Report	McManus 26'; Behan 90+5'	Stadium: Carlisle Grounds; Attendance: 2,030; Referee: Daniel Murphy

Bray Wanderers won 4–2 on aggregate

24 October 2025	Treaty United	1–0	Cobh Ramblers	Limerick
19:45	Hanson 77'	Report		Stadium: Markets Field; Attendance: 1,849; Referee: Oliver Moran

28 October 2025	Cobh Ramblers	1–1 (a.e.t.)	Treaty United	Cobh
19:45	Whelan 90+4'	Report	Martin 105'	Stadium: St. Colman's Park; Attendance: 1,636; Referee: Mark Houlihan

Treaty United won 2–1 on aggregate

=== Final ===
2 November 2025	Bray Wanderers	1–0	Treaty United	Athlone
15:00	Ferizaj 90'	Report		Stadium: Athlone Town Stadium

=== Promotion/relegation play-off ===
7 November 2025	Bray Wanderers	1–2	Waterford	Drumcondra
19:45	Knight 8' Warren (red card) 90+3'	Report	Noonan 30'; Glenfield 74' Bakboord (red card) 90+3'	Stadium: Tolka Park; Attendance: 3,648; Referee: Kevin O'Sullivan

== Positions by round ==
To preserve chronological evolvements, any postponed matches are not included to the round at which they were originally scheduled, but added to the full round they were played immediately afterwards. For example, if a match is scheduled for round 7, but then played between rounds 8 and 9, it will be added to the standings for round 8.

Team ╲ Round	1	2	3	4	5	6	7	8	9	10	11	12	13	14	15	16	17	18	19	20	21	22	23	24	25	26	27	28	29	30	31	32	33	34	35	36
Shamrock Rovers	9	9	9	10	8	6	6	5	3	3	3	4	3	2	1	1	1	1	1	1	1	1	1	1	1	1	1	1	1	1	1	1	1	1	1	1
Derry City	10	6	8	9	10	7	7	6	6	6	6	7	5	3	2	2	3	6	6	4	4	2	2	3	3	3	3	3	3	2	3	2	2	2	2	2
Shelbourne	1	1	1	3	3	4	4	4	5	4	4	5	6	7	6	6	6	5	5	6	5	5	5	5	5	5	5	6	4	4	6	6	3	3	3	3
Bohemians	3	5	7	7	6	9	9	7	7	7	7	6	7	5	4	3	4	3	2	3	2	3	3	2	2	2	2	2	2	3	2	3	4	4	5	4
St Patrick's Athletic	5	8	6	4	4	2	1	2	2	2	2	3	1	4	5	4	5	4	4	5	6	6	6	6	7	6	6	5	4	4	4	5	6	5	4	5
Drogheda United	5	2	3	2	1	1	3	1	1	1	1	1	2	1	3	5	2	2	3	2	3	4	4	4	4	4	4	4	6	6	5	4	5	6	6	6
Sligo Rovers	8	10	10	8	9	10	10	10	10	9	10	10	10	10	10	10	10	10	9	9	9	9	9	9	9	9	9	9	9	9	7	7	7	8	8	7
Galway United	4	3	4	5	4	3	2	3	4	5	5	2	4	6	8	8	7	7	7	7	7	7	7	8	8	8	8	8	8	8	9	8	9	7	7	8
Waterford	2	4	2	1	2	5	5	8	8	8	9	8	8	8	7	7	8	8	8	8	8	8	8	7	6	7	7	7	7	7	8	9	8	9	9	9
Cork City	4	7	5	6	7	8	8	9	9	10	8	9	9	9	9	9	9	9	10	10	10	10	10	10	10	10	10	10	10	10	10	10	10	10	10	10

Leader and qualification for Champions League first qualifying round
Qualification for Conference League second qualifying round
Qualification for Conference League first qualifying round
Qualification for promotion/relegation play-off
Relegation to League of Ireland First Division

Source: leagueofireland.ie, Extratime.ie

== Season statistics ==
=== Top scorers ===
Rank	Player	Club	Goals
1	(Republic of Ireland) Pádraig Amond	Waterford	14
2	(Republic of Ireland) Mason Melia	St Patrick's Athletic	13
3	(Republic of Ireland) Michael Duffy	Derry City	12
3	(Republic of Ireland) Owen Elding	Sligo Rovers	12
5	(New Zealand) Moses Dyer	Galway United	10
6	(Republic of Ireland) Rory Gaffney	Shamrock Rovers	9
6	(Republic of Ireland) Tommy Lonergan	Waterford	9
6	(England) Harry Wood	Shelbourne	9
9	(Northern Ireland) Liam Boyce	Derry City	8
9	(Republic of Ireland) Graham Burke	Shamrock Rovers	8
9	(Republic of Ireland) James Clarke	Bohemians	8
9	(Republic of Ireland) Mipo Odubeko	Shelbourne	8

=== Hat-tricks ===
Player	For	Against	Result	Date	Ref.
(Republic of Ireland) Colm Whelan	Bohemians	Waterford	3–0 (A)	7 March 2025	
(Republic of Ireland) John Martin	Shelbourne	Sligo Rovers	3–2 (H)	23 May 2025	
(Northern Ireland) Liam Boyce	Derry City	Waterford	7–2 (H)	4 July 2025	

=== Clean sheets ===
Rank	Player	Club	Clean sheets
1	(Ghana) Joseph Anang	St Patrick's Athletic	18
2	(United States) Luke Dennison	Drogheda United	14
3	(Republic of Ireland) Brian Maher	Derry City	12
4	(Poland) Kacper Chorążka	Bohemians	11
5	(Republic of Ireland) Edward McGinty	Shamrock Rovers	10
6	(England) Sam Sargeant	Sligo Rovers	7
7	(Northern Ireland) Stephen McMullan	Waterford	5
7	(Republic of Ireland) Conor Kearns	Shelbourne	5
9	(Netherlands) Wessel Speel	Shelbourne	4
10	(Republic of Ireland) Conor Brann	Cork City	3
10	(Wales) Evan Watts	Galway United	3

=== Discipline ===
==== Player ====
- Most yellow cards: 15
  - (Republic of Ireland) Adam O'Reilly (Derry City)
- Most red cards: 1
  - 32 players (Various)

==== Club ====
- Most yellow cards: 114
  - Derry City
- Most red cards: 7
  - Derry City

== Awards ==
=== Monthly awards ===
Month	Player of the Month		Goal of the Month		References
Month	Player	Club	Player	Club	References
February	(Republic of Ireland) Aidan Keena	St Patrick's Athletic	(Republic of Ireland) Aidan Keena	St Patrick's Athletic	
March	(Republic of Ireland) Darragh Markey	Drogheda United	(New Zealand) Moses Dyer	Galway United	
April	(New Zealand) Moses Dyer	Galway United	(Northern Ireland) Gavin Whyte	Derry City	
May	(Republic of Ireland) Graham Burke	Shamrock Rovers	(Republic of Ireland) Owen Elding	Sligo Rovers	
June	(Republic of Ireland) Michael Duffy	Derry City	(Republic of Ireland) David Hurley	Galway United	
July	(Republic of Ireland) Pádraig Amond	Waterford	N/A (Note: Award was won by League of Ireland Women's Premier Division player, Kate Mooney.)		
August	(England) Harry Wood	Shelbourne	(England) Douglas James-Taylor	Bohemians	
September	(Republic of Ireland) Matt Healy	Shamrock Rovers	(Republic of Ireland) Alex Nolan	Cork City	
October	(Scotland) Kerr McInroy	Shelbourne	(Scotland) Kerr McInroy	Shelbourne	
November	(Republic of Ireland) Rory Gaffney	Shamrock Rovers	N/A (Note: League concluded on 1st November, therefore no award was issued for this month.)		

=== Annual awards ===
Award	Winner	Club
PFAI Manager of the Year	(Republic of Ireland) Stephen Bradley	Shamrock Rovers
PFAI Player of the Year	(Republic of Ireland) Michael Duffy	Derry City
PFAI Young Player of the Year	(Republic of Ireland) Owen Elding	Sligo Rovers
SSE Airtricity/SWI Men’s Personality of the Year	(Cape Verde) Roberto Lopes	Shamrock Rovers
SSE Airtricity/SWI Goalkeeper of the Year	(Republic of Ireland) Edward McGinty	Shamrock Rovers
Goal of the Season	(Republic of Ireland) Owen Elding	Sligo Rovers

PFAI Team of the Year
Goalkeeper	(United States) Luke Dennison (Drogheda United)			
Defenders	(Republic of Ireland) Paddy Barrett (Shelbourne)	(Cape Verde) Roberto Lopes (Shamrock Rovers)	(Republic of Ireland) Conor Keeley (Drogheda United)	(Republic of Ireland) Josh Honohan (Shamrock Rovers)
Midfielders	(Republic of Ireland) Dawson Devoy (Bohemians)		(Republic of Ireland) Matt Healy (Shamrock Rovers)	(Republic of Ireland) Graham Burke (Shamrock Rovers)
Forwards	(Republic of Ireland) Michael Duffy (Derry City)		(Republic of Ireland) Pádraig Amond (Waterford)	(Republic of Ireland) Owen Elding (Sligo Rovers)

== Attendances ==
No.	Club	Average attendance	Change	Highest
1	Shamrock Rovers	5,996	-1,2%	9,522
2	Bohemians	5,860	38,2%	33,208
3	Shelbourne	4,556	6,7%	5,633
4	St Patrick's Athletic	4,342	-1,4%	5,374
5	Derry City	3,466	20,7%	4,327
6	Cork City	3,053	15,8%	5,034
7	Sligo Rovers	2,814	-1,5%	4,023
8	Galway United	2,785	-7,6%	4,323
9	Waterford	2,608	-4,4%	3,488
10	Drogheda United	2,295	13,5%	2,596

== See also ==
- 2025 League of Ireland First Division
- 2025 League of Ireland Women's Premier Division
- 2025 FAI Cup
