= David McMillan =

David McMillan may refer to:

- David McMillan (footballer) (born 1988), Irish football (soccer) player
- David McMillan (American football) (1981–2013), American football player
- David McMillan (smuggler) (born 1956), former independent drug smuggler
- David McMillan (politician) (1836–1904), New Zealand politician
- Dave McMillan (born 1944), New Zealand former racing driver
- David McMillan, Canadian chef at the restaurant Joe Beef

== See also ==
- Dave MacMillan (1886–1963), American basketball coach
- David MacMillan (born 1968), Scottish chemist and Nobel Prize Laureate
- David Macmillan (historian) (1925–1987), British historian
- David MacMillan (sound engineer), American sound engineer and three-time Oscar winner
