= Matt Healy (footballer) =

Irish footballer

Personal information
- Full name: Matthew James Healy
- Date of birth: 12 April 2002 (age 24)
- Place of birth: Riverstick, County Cork, Ireland
- Position: Midfielder

Team information
- Current team: Shamrock Rovers
- Number: 8

Youth career
- –2018: College Corinthians
- 2018–2021: Ipswich Town

Senior career*
| Years | Team | Apps | (Gls) |
| 2020–2023 | Ipswich Town | 0 | (0) |
| 2022 | → Cork City (loan) | 26 | (4) |
| 2023 | → Cork City (loan) | 16 | (2) |
| 2023–2025 | Francs Borains | 43 | (4) |
| 2025– | Shamrock Rovers | 67 | (5) |

International career^{‡}
| 2018 | Republic of Ireland U16 | 1 | (0) |
| 2018 | Republic of Ireland U17 | 1 | (0) |
| 2023–2024 | Republic of Ireland U21 | 12 | (0) |
- * Club domestic league appearances and goals as of 17:15, 9 November 2026 (UTC) ‡ National team caps and goals as of 19:23, 15 October 2024 (UTC)

Matthew James Healy (born 12 April 2002) is an Irish professional footballer who plays as a midfielder for League of Ireland Premier Division club Shamrock Rovers.

== Club career ==
=== Early life ===
A native of Riverstick, County Cork, he attended Kinsale Community School. Healy began playing with local side College Corinthians before moving the Ipswich Town Academy in July 2018 after impressing on several trials with the club.

=== Ipswich Town ===
His first involvement with the Ipswich Town first team was on 10 November 2020, when he was an unused substitute in a 2–0 defeat away to Crawley Town in the EFL Trophy. He signed his first professional contract with the club, signing a 2-year contract in July 2021. On 24 May 2023, the club announced that Healy would be released at the end of his contract in June.

==== Cork City loans ====
On 1 February 2022, it was announced that Healy had returned home to sign for League of Ireland First Division side Cork City on loan until the end of June. In May 2022, it was confirmed to at his loan spell had been extended until the end of the season in November. He scored 4 goals in 26 games in the league as his side won the 2022 League of Ireland First Division, to gain promotion to the League of Ireland Premier Division. On 6 January 2023, Healy returned to Cork City, signing on loan until the end of June 2023. He made 17 appearances, scoring 2 goals during his second loan spell with the club.

=== Francs Borains ===
Healy signed for Belgian Challenger Pro League side Francs Borains on 16 July 2023. Healy made 43 appearances and scored 4 goals during his 18 months with the club.

=== Shamrock Rovers ===
On 14 January 2025, Healy joined League of Ireland Premier Division club Shamrock Rovers on a three-year contract for an undisclosed fee.

== International career ==
Healy has represented the Republic of Ireland at youth level, playing for the U16 and U17 teams. On 8 September 2023, he made his Republic of Ireland U21 debut, in a 3–2 win over Turkey U21 at Turners Cross.

== Career statistics ==
As of match played on 30 October 2026

Appearances and goals by club, season and competition
| Club | Season | League | | | National Cup (Note: Includes FA Cup, FAI Cup & Belgian Cup) | | League Cup (Note: Includes EFL Cup) | | Europe | | Other | | Total | |
| Club | Season | Division | Apps | Goals | Apps | Goals | Apps | Goals | Apps | Goals | Apps | Goals | Apps | Goals |
|---|---|---|---|---|---|---|---|---|---|---|---|---|---|---|
| Ipswich Town | 2020–21 | EFL League One | 0 | 0 | 0 | 0 | 0 | 0 | — | | 0 (Note: Appearance in the EFL Trophy) | 0 | 0 | 0 |
| Ipswich Town | 2021–22 | EFL League One | 0 | 0 | 0 | 0 | 0 | 0 | — | | 0 | 0 | 0 | 0 |
| Ipswich Town | 2022–23 | EFL League One | 0 | 0 | 0 | 0 | 0 | 0 | — | | 0 | 0 | 0 | 0 |
| Ipswich Town | Total | | 0 | 0 | 0 | 0 | 0 | 0 | — | | 0 | 0 | 0 | 0 |
| Cork City (loan) | 2022 | LOI First Division | 26 | 4 | 1 | 0 | — | | — | | — | | 27 | 4 |
| Cork City (loan) | 2023 | LOI Premier Division | 16 | 2 | — | | — | | — | | 1 (Note: Appearance(s) in the Munster Senior Cup) | 0 | 17 | 2 |
| Cork City (loan) | Total | | 42 | 6 | 0 | 0 | — | | — | | 1 | 0 | 44 | 6 |
| Francs Borains | 2023–24 | Challenger Pro League | 29 | 4 | 0 | 0 | — | | — | | — | | 29 | 4 |
| Francs Borains | 2024–25 | Challenger Pro League | 14 | 0 | 0 | 0 | — | | — | | — | | 14 | 0 |
| Francs Borains | Total | | 43 | 4 | 0 | 0 | — | | — | | — | | 43 | 4 |
| Shamrock Rovers | 2025 | LOI Premier Division | 34 | 3 | 4 | 0 | — | | 12 (Note: 2 appearances in the 2024–25 UEFA Conference League campaign; 10 appearances in the 2025–26 UEFA Conference League campaign) | 0 | 0 (Note: Appearance(s) in the Leinster Senior Cup) | 0 | 50 | 3 |
| Shamrock Rovers | 2026 | LOI Premier Division | 33 | 2 | 1 | 0 | — | | 7 (Note: 3 appearances, 1 goal in the UEFA Champions League; 2 appearances in the UEFA Europa League; 2 appearances in the UEFA Conference League) | 0 | 1 (Note: Appearance in the President of Ireland's Cup) | 1 | 42 | 3 |
| Shamrock Rovers | Total | | 67 | 5 | 5 | 0 | — | | 19 | 1 | 1 | 0 | 92 | 6 |
| Career total | | | 152 | 15 | 6 | 0 | 0 | 0 | 19 | 1 | 2 | 0 | 179 | 16 |

== Honours ==
=== Club ===
Cork City

- League of Ireland First Division: 2022

Shamrock Rovers

- League of Ireland Premier Division: 2025, 2026

=== Individual ===
- PFAI Premier Division Team of the Year: 2025
