= Bohemians–Shamrock Rovers rivalry =

Irish football rivalry

Dublin derby
- Location: Dublin
- Teams: Bohemians; Shamrock Rovers
- First meeting: 9 January 1915
- Latest meeting: Shamrock Rovers F.C. 2-1 Bohemians F.C. (12 Oct 2026); League of Ireland Premier Division
- Broadcasters: RTÉ, Virgin Media, LOI TV
- Stadiums: Dalymount Park (Bohemians); Tallaght Stadium (Shamrock Rovers)

Bohemians–Shamrock Rovers is an Irish football rivalry involving two of the most successful clubs in the League of Ireland. It is also a local derby, one of many involving Dublin clubs. The fixture is over a century in existence and has developed into an intense one, traditionally attracting large attendances. The tie has been played out at numerous venues across the city, with Dalymount Park being the stadium most synonymous with the fixture, having hosted more games than any other. The 2025 season-opening meeting of the two clubs in Aviva Stadium set a League of Ireland attendance record of over 33,000 people.

== History ==
The first game played between the two sides was a Leinster Senior Cup fixture on Saturday, 9 January 1915. The game, staged at Dalymount Park, finished 3–0 to Bohemians. Shamrock Rovers achieved their first victory over Bohemians when they defeated them in the semi–final of the FAI Cup in 1921–22. In 1945, the two clubs contested the FAI Cup final in front of a record attendance of almost 45,000 people, with Rovers winning the game 1–0. In 1969, Bohemians dropped their amateur ethos in favour of professionalism. The subsequent success achieved by the club and the demise of Drumcondra, positioned them as the major club on the Northside. Since then, the relatively minor rivalry that existed between Shamrock Rovers and Bohemians has developed into a classic rivalry, producing intense games and large attendances.

While there have been many examples over the years of the importance of the rivalry to the supporters of each club, one of the more recent incidents of note was the signing of Tony Grant and James Keddy by Bohs from Rovers, which led to a pig's head being thrown onto the pitch during their first game versus their old club, in a gesture aimed at Grant in particular. The incident was one of many to reach the front pages of Ireland's newspapers, particularly over the last ten to fifteen years and remained a topic of humour amongst the media for weeks after. In contrast, some of the darker incidents of recent times have been the desecration of the monument commemorating the former home of Shamrock Rovers, Glenmalure Park, and two instances of crowd trouble at Dalymount Park in 2000 and Richmond Park in 2003, with the latter resulting in the eviction of Rovers from the Inchicore venue. While violence at the fixture is increasingly sporadic, a large Garda presence remains commonplace. In 2016 during an away 4-0 for Rovers, fans from both sides invaded the pitch, fighting was reported with the Garda Public Order unit intervening.

Rovers and Bohs games attracted relatively large crowds in the 1980s and 1990s, including two FAI Cup fixtures in the 1993–94 season which saw over 10,000 people at each, but the attendances at the fixture have generally followed the same sliding trend as the rest of the League's fixtures over the last forty years. A significant drop occurred during the second half of the previous decade as a result of Shamrock Rovers playing their matches in Tolka Park, Richmond Park and Dalymount Park and the club having an average attendance of just over 1,000 during these years. The attendances rose in 2009, largely due to Rovers' move to Tallaght Stadium and, Bohs' status as League of Ireland champions, with the attendance at one game doubling the previous encounter. In February 2025, a Showcase of Irish Football match was organised as a season opener for both clubs in Ireland's national football venue, Aviva Stadium. The fixture set an all-time attendance record for League of Ireland with 33,208 spectators in attendance.

== Culture ==
The clubs originate from separate sides of the city. Bohemians were founded on the Northside of Dublin in Phibsboro and have remained there since, while Shamrock Rovers were founded in Ringsend, on the Southside. They played on the Northside for a significant proportion of their homeless years, but have spent the majority of their history on the Southside, seemingly moving alongside the River Dodder. Both clubs naturally draw the majority of their support from the side of the city that they're native to, but maintain a significant minority of support drawn from the rest of Dublin. Both clubs also share less significant rivalries with other Dublin clubs Shelbourne and St Patrick's Athletic.

== Results ==
=== League ===
Season	Date	Home team	Result	Away team	Stadium	Attendance
1998–99	2 October 1998	Shamrock Rovers	3 – 0	Bohemians	Tolka Park	
1998–99	27 December 1998	Bohemians	1 – 1	Shamrock Rovers	Dalymount Park	
1998–99	26 March 1999	Shamrock Rovers	1 – 1	Bohemians	Tolka Park	
1999–2000	19 September 1999	Bohemians	1 – 3	Shamrock Rovers	Dalymount Park	
1999–2000	4 December 1999	Shamrock Rovers	0 – 1	Bohemians	Tolka Park	
1999–2000	9 March 2000	Bohemians	0 – 0	Shamrock Rovers	Dalymount Park	
2000–01	14 August 2000	Shamrock Rovers	0 – 0	Bohemians	Tolka Park	
2000–01	3 November 2000	Bohemians	0 – 1	Shamrock Rovers	Dalymount Park	
2000–01	28 January 2001	Shamrock Rovers	4 – 6	Bohemians	Morton Stadium	
2001–02	7 September 2001	Bohemians	0 – 1	Shamrock Rovers	Dalymount Park	
2001–02	9 November 2001	Shamrock Rovers	1 – 0	Bohemians	Richmond Park	
2001–02	15 February 2002	Bohemians	1 – 1	Shamrock Rovers	Dalymount Park	
2002–03	2 August 2002	Bohemians	3 – 2	Shamrock Rovers	Dalymount Park	
2002–03	20 October 2002	Shamrock Rovers	1 – 1	Bohemians	Tolka Park	
2002–03	13 December 2002	Bohemians	3 – 2	Shamrock Rovers	Dalymount Park	
2003	27 April 2003	Bohemians	1 – 1	Shamrock Rovers	Dalymount Park	
2003	1 September 2003	Shamrock Rovers	1 – 2	Bohemians	Richmond Park	
2003	22 September 2003	Bohemians	2 – 1	Shamrock Rovers	Dalymount Park	
2003	24 October 2003	Shamrock Rovers	0 – 0	Bohemians	Tolka Park	
2004	16 April 2004	Bohemians	2 – 2	Shamrock Rovers	Dalymount Park	
2004	12 June 2004	Shamrock Rovers	2 – 1	Bohemians	Dalymount Park	
2004	27 August 2004	Bohemians	3 – 2	Shamrock Rovers	Dalymount Park	
2004	5 November 2004	Shamrock Rovers	0 – 1	Bohemians	Tolka Park	
2005	18 March 2005	Bohemians	1 – 1	Shamrock Rovers	Dalymount Park	
2005	3 June 2005	Shamrock Rovers	1 – 2	Bohemians	Dalymount Park	
2005	2 September 2005	Bohemians	1 – 3	Shamrock Rovers	Dalymount Park	
2007	3 April 2007	Bohemians	2 – 1	Shamrock Rovers	Dalymount Park	
2007	29 June 2007	Shamrock Rovers	1 – 1	Bohemians	Tolka Park	
2007	17 September 2007	Bohemians	0 – 2	Shamrock Rovers	Dalymount Park	
2008	4 April 2008	Shamrock Rovers	0 – 1	Bohemians	Tolka Park	
2008	5 August 2008	Bohemians	2 – 1	Shamrock Rovers	Dalymount Park	
2008	26 September 2008	Shamrock Rovers	1 – 2	Bohemians	Tolka Park	
2009	20 March 2009	Bohemians	2 – 0	Shamrock Rovers	Dalymount Park	
2009	16 May 2009	Shamrock Rovers	2 – 1	Bohemians	Tallaght Stadium	
2009	26 July 2009	Bohemians	0 – 0	Shamrock Rovers	Dalymount Park	
2009	2 October 2009	Shamrock Rovers	1 – 0	Bohemians	Tallaght Stadium	
2010	9 April 2010	Shamrock Rovers	1 – 0	Bohemians	Tallaght Stadium	
2010	29 May 2010	Bohemians	0 – 0	Shamrock Rovers	Dalymount Park	
2010	8 August 2010	Shamrock Rovers	3 – 0	Bohemians	Tallaght Stadium	
2010	5 October 2010	Bohemians	1 – 0	Shamrock Rovers	Dalymount Park	
2011	15 April 2011	Bohemians	1 – 1	Shamrock Rovers	Dalymount Park	3200
2011	30 May 2011	Shamrock Rovers	1 – 0	Bohemians	Tallaght Stadium	
2011	5 August 2011	Bohemians	0 – 1	Shamrock Rovers	Dalymount Park	2784
2011	5 October 2011	Shamrock Rovers	1 – 1	Bohemians	Tallaght Stadium	4082
2012	30 March 2012	Shamrock Rovers	2 – 0	Bohemians	Tallaght Stadium	4600
2012	29 June 2012	Bohemians	4 – 0	Shamrock Rovers	Dalymount Park	4000
2012	10 September 2012	Shamrock Rovers	0 – 1	Bohemians	Tallaght Stadium	3500
2013	19 March 2013	Bohemians	0 – 0	Shamrock Rovers	Dalymount Park	2785
2013	17 May 2013	Shamrock Rovers	1 – 1	Bohemians	Tallaght Stadium	3800
2013	16 August 2013	Bohemians	1 – 0	Shamrock Rovers	Dalymount Park	2761
2014	21 March 2014	Bohemians	1 – 3	Shamrock Rovers	Dalymount Park	5000
2014	23 May 2014	Shamrock Rovers	0 – 0	Bohemians	Tallaght Stadium	3500
2014	23 September 2014	Bohemians	1 – 1	Shamrock Rovers	Dalymount Park	2296
2015	27 March 2015	Shamrock Rovers	0 – 0	Bohemians	Tallaght Stadium	4500
2015	13 June 2015	Bohemians	3 – 1	Shamrock Rovers	Dalymount Park	3385
2015	5 September 2015	Shamrock Rovers	1 – 1	Bohemians	Tallaght Stadium	3000
2016	15 April 2016	Bohemians	0 – 4	Shamrock Rovers	Dalymount Park	3627
2016	15 July 2016	Shamrock Rovers	3 – 1	Bohemians	Tallaght Stadium	3000
2016	7 October 2016	Bohemians	1 – 0	Shamrock Rovers	Dalymount Park	3500
2017	3 March 2017	Shamrock Rovers	2 – 1	Bohemians	Tallaght Stadium	5220
2017	12 May 2017	Bohemians	0 – 2	Shamrock Rovers	Dalymount Park	3622
2017	28 July 2017	Shamrock Rovers	1 – 2	Bohemians	Tallaght Stadium	4534
2018	16 February 2018	Bohemians	3 – 1	Shamrock Rovers	Dalymount Park	3640
2018	13 April 2018	Shamrock Rovers	1 – 2	Bohemians	Tallaght Stadium	4512
2018	25 May 2018	Bohemians	1 – 1	Shamrock Rovers	Dalymount Park	3600
2018	17 August 2018	Shamrock Rovers	0 – 1	Bohemians	Tallaght Stadium	4150
2019	25 February 2019	Bohemians	1 – 0	Shamrock Rovers	Dalymount Park	3594
2019	23 April 2019	Shamrock Rovers	0 – 1	Bohemians	Tallaght Stadium	6414
2019	14 June 2019	Bohemians	2 – 1	Shamrock Rovers	Dalymount Park	3594
2019	30 August 2019	Shamrock Rovers	1 – 0	Bohemians	Tallaght Stadium	7021
2020	15 February 2020	Bohemians	0 – 1	Shamrock Rovers	Dalymount Park	3580
2020	5 September 2020	Shamrock Rovers	1 – 0	Bohemians	Tallaght Stadium	0
2021	23 April 2021	Shamrock Rovers	2 – 1	Bohemians	Tallaght Stadium	0
2021	21 June 2021	Bohemians	1 – 0	Shamrock Rovers	Dalymount Park	0
2021	18 October 2021	Shamrock Rovers	1 – 1	Bohemians	Tallaght Stadium	4000
2021	12 November 2021	Bohemians	3 – 1	Shamrock Rovers	Dalymount Park	3600
2022	11 March 2022	Shamrock Rovers	1 – 0	Bohemians	Tallaght Stadium	7478
2022	22 April 2022	Bohemians	1 – 3	Shamrock Rovers	Dalymount Park	3700
2022	24 June 2022	Shamrock Rovers	1 – 0	Bohemians	Tallaght Stadium	7445
2022	2 September 2022	Bohemians	1 – 0	Shamrock Rovers	Dalymount Park	3230
2023	7 April 2023	Bohemians	0 – 2	Shamrock Rovers	Dalymount Park	4290
2023	5 May 2023	Shamrock Rovers	2 – 0	Bohemians	Tallaght Stadium	7864
2023	23 June 2023	Bohemians	2 – 2	Shamrock Rovers	Dalymount Park	4370
2023	1 September 2023	Shamrock Rovers	3 – 0	Bohemians	Tallaght Stadium	7816
2024	29 March 2024	Shamrock Rovers	3 – 0	Bohemians	Tallaght Stadium	10,094
2024	29 March 2024	Bohemians	1 – 1	Shamrock Rovers	Dalymount Park	4,429
2024	1 September 2024	Bohemians	1 – 0	Shamrock Rovers	Dalymount Park	4,436
2024	23 September 2024	Shamrock Rovers	1 – 0	Bohemians	Tallaght Stadium	6,119
2025	16 February 2025	Bohemians	1 – 0	Shamrock Rovers	Aviva Stadium	33,208
2025	21 April 2025	Shamrock Rovers	2 – 3	Bohemians	Tallaght Stadium	8,471
2025	23 June 2025	Bohemians	2 – 0	Shamrock Rovers	Dalymount Park	4,421
2025	26 September 2025	Shamrock Rovers	2 – 1	Bohemians	Tallaght Stadium	9,522
2026	27 February 2026	Bohemians	3 – 2	Shamrock Rovers	Dalymount Park	4,442
2026	17 April 2026	Shamrock Rovers	2 – 1	Bohemians	Tallaght Stadium	9,202
2026	25 May 2026	Bohemians	1 – 2	Shamrock Rovers	Dalymount Park	4,422
2026	12 October 2026	Shamrock Rovers	2 – 1	Bohemians	Tallaght Stadium	10,208

=== Cup ===
Season	Date	Home team	Result	Away team	Stadium	Competition
1921–22	25 February 1922	Bohemians	0 – 1	Shamrock Rovers	Dalymount Park	FAI Cup
1923–24	5 January 1924	Bohemians	1 – 0	Shamrock Rovers		FAI Cup
1924–25	3 January 1925	Bohemians	0 – 2	Shamrock Rovers		FAI Cup
1925–26	9 January 1926	Bohemians	0 – 0	Shamrock Rovers		FAI Cup
1925–26	16 January 1926	Shamrock Rovers	2 – 2 Replay	Bohemians		FAI Cup
1925–26	20 January 1926	Shamrock Rovers	2 – 0 Replay 2	Bohemians		FAI Cup
1928–29	18 March 1929	Shamrock Rovers	0 – 0	Bohemians		FAI Cup
1928–29	6 April 1929	Shamrock Rovers	3 – 0 Replay	Bohemians		FAI Cup
1973–74	?	Bohemians	1 – 1	Shamrock Rovers	?	League of Ireland Cup
1974–75	6 September 1974	Bohemians	0 – 2	Shamrock Rovers	?	League of Ireland Cup
1978–79	22 March 1978	Bohemians	2 – 0	Shamrock Rovers	Dalymount Park	League of Ireland Cup
1982–83	17 September 1982	Shamrock Rovers	1 – 2	Bohemians	Glenmalure Park	League of Ireland Cup
1983–84	16 September 1983	Bohemians	2 – 1	Shamrock Rovers	?	League of Ireland Cup
1987–88	6 September 1987	Shamrock Rovers	3 – 0	Bohemians	Tolka Park	League of Ireland Cup
1989–90	16 August 1989	Shamrock Rovers	1 – 1	Bohemians	Dalymount Park	League of Ireland Cup
2000–01	13 April 2001	Bohemians	1 – 0	Shamrock Rovers	Dalymount Park	FAI Cup
2002–03	6 October 2002	Shamrock Rovers	2 – 0	Bohemians	Tolka Park	FAI Cup
2006	25 August 2006	Shamrock Rovers	0 – 0	Bohemians	Tolka Park	FAI Cup
2006	29 August 2006	Bohemians	0 – 2	Shamrock Rovers	Dalymount Park	FAI Cup
2007	7 August 2007	Bohemians	1 – 0	Shamrock Rovers	Dalymount Park	League of Ireland Cup
2011	4 July 2011	Bohemians	2 – 1 (AET)	Shamrock Rovers	Dalymount Park	Leinster Senior Cup
2012	12 March 2012	Shamrock Rovers	1 – 1 (AET) PENS 6 – 5	Bohemians	Tallaght Stadium	Leinster Senior Cup
2014	28 April 2014	Shamrock Rovers	3 – 0	Bohemians	Tallaght Stadium	Leinster Senior Cup
2014	4 August 2014	Bohemians	0 – 2	Shamrock Rovers	Dalymount Park	League of Ireland Cup
2015	2 October 2015	Bohemians	0 – 0 (AET) PENS 2 – 4	Shamrock Rovers	Dalymount Park	Leinster Senior Cup
2017	17 April 2017	Shamrock Rovers	3 – 1	Bohemians	Tallaght Stadium	League of Ireland Cup
2019	27 September 2019	Bohemians	0 – 2	Shamrock Rovers	Dalymount Park	FAI Cup
2021	30 August 2021	Bohemians	1 – 0	Shamrock Rovers	Dalymount Park	FAI Cup
2024	19 July 2024	Bohemians	1 – 0	Shamrock Rovers	Dalymount Park	FAI Cup

=== Statistics ===
Since 1998/1999 season

Competition	Bohemians wins	Draws	Shamrock Rovers wins
League of Ireland	35	25	36
FAI Cup	4	4	7
League of Ireland Cup	5	2	3
Leinster Senior Cup	1	2	1

== See also ==
- Bohemians
- Shamrock Rovers
- Derbies in the League of Ireland
- Major football rivalries
