= 2026 League of Ireland Premier Division =

42nd season of the League of Ireland Premier Division

League of Ireland Premier Division
- Season: 2026
- Dates: 6 February 2026 – 30 October 2026
- Champions: Shamrock Rovers (23rd title)
- Relegated: Drogheda United; Sligo Rovers
- Champions League: Shamrock Rovers
- Europa League: Derry City (via FAI Cup)
- Conference League: Bohemians; St Patrick's Athletic
- Matches: 180
- Goals: 506 (2.81 per match)
- Top goalscorer: Tommy Lonergan (16 goals)
- Biggest home win: Dundalk 5–0 Waterford (13 March 2026)
- Biggest away win: Sligo Rovers 0–4 Bohemians (14 February 2026)
- Highest scoring: Bohemians 5–3 Derry City (21 August 2026)
- Longest winning run: 5 matches Bohemians
- Longest unbeaten run: 10 matches Bohemians
- Longest winless run: 16 matches Waterford
- Longest losing run: 5 matches Waterford
- Highest attendance: 21,472; Bohemians 0–0 St Patrick's Athletic (8 February 2026)
- Lowest attendance: 454; Galway United 0–1 Dundalk (12 June 2026)
- Total attendance: 642,262
- Average attendance: 3,568
- All statistics correct as of 16 May 2026.

The 2026 League of Ireland Premier Division, known as the SSE Airtricity Men's Premier Division for sponsorship reasons, was the 42nd season of the League of Ireland Premier Division, the top Irish league for association football clubs since its establishment in 1985.

The competition began on 6 February 2026 and concluded on 30 October 2026.

Shamrock Rovers were the defending champions, having won their 10th Premier Division title the previous season.

On 9 October, Sligo Rovers were relegated after a 1-5 defeat to Shelbourne at Tolka Park ending a 21 year stay in the top flight.

On 23 October, Shamrock Rovers retained the title after a 4-0 win against Sligo Rovers, with a game to spare, it was their 23rd title.

On 7 November 2026, Drogheda United ended a 6 year spell in the Premier Division when they were relegated to the First Division after losing 2–1 to UCD in the 2026 League of Ireland play-offs.

== Teams ==
The league consists of ten teams – the top nine teams from the previous season and one team promoted as champions from the First Division, Dundalk. They replaced Cork City who were relegated after a single season in the top flight.

=== Stadiums and locations ===
Locations of Premier Division teams
Locations of Dublin Premier Division teams

Team	Location	Stadium	Capacity
Bohemians	Dublin (Phibsborough)	Dalymount Park	4,500
Bohemians	Dublin (Ballsbridge)	Aviva Stadium	51,711
Derry City	Derry	Ryan McBride Brandywell Stadium	6,242
Derry City	Derry	Celtic Park	18,500
Drogheda United	Drogheda	Sullivan and Lambe Park	3,500
Dundalk	Dundalk	Oriel Park	4,500
Galway United	Galway	Eamonn Deacy Park	5,000
Galway United	Galway (Salthill)	Pearse Stadium	26,197
Galway United	Cork	Turners Cross	7,485
Shamrock Rovers	Dublin (Tallaght)	Tallaght Stadium	10,500
Shelbourne	Dublin (Drumcondra)	Tolka Park	6,450
Sligo Rovers	Sligo	The Showgrounds	3,873
St Patrick's Athletic	Dublin (Inchicore)	Richmond Park	5,500
Waterford	Waterford	RSC	5,160

=== Personnel and kits ===
Note: Flags indicate national team as has been defined under FIFA eligibility rules. Players may hold more than one non-FIFA nationality.

Team	Manager	Captain	Kit manufacturer	Shirt sponsor
Bohemians	(Republic of Ireland) Alan Reynolds	(Republic of Ireland) Dawson Devoy	O'Neills	Des Kelly Interiors; Kneecap (Note: Away & Third kits); Massive Attack (Note: Fourth kit)
Derry City	(Republic of Ireland) Mark Connolly (interim)	(Republic of Ireland) Michael Duffy	O'Neills	Diamond Corrugated
Drogheda United	(Republic of Ireland) Kevin Doherty	(Republic of Ireland) Ryan Brennan	Macron	NoFo Brew Co
Dundalk	(Republic of Ireland) Ciarán Kilduff	(Republic of Ireland) Daryl Horgan	Macron	ZOMA
Galway United	(Republic of Ireland) John Caulfield	(Republic of Ireland) Jimmy Keohane	O'Neills	Comer Property Management
Shamrock Rovers	(Republic of Ireland) Stephen Bradley	(Cape Verde) Roberto Lopes	Macron	MASCOT Workwear
Shelbourne	(Republic of Ireland) John Russell	(Republic of Ireland) Paddy Barrett	O'Neills	Chadwicks
Sligo Rovers	(England) Darren Purse	(Republic of Ireland) Carl McHugh	Umbro	Avant Money
St Patrick's Athletic	(Republic of Ireland) Stephen Kenny	(Republic of Ireland) Joe Redmond	Umbro	Clune; Elliott Group (Note: Away kit); The Wolfe Tones (Note: Third kit)
Waterford	(Republic of Ireland) Graham Coughlan	(Republic of Ireland) Pádraig Amond	Puma	WhiteBox

=== Managerial changes ===
Team	Outgoing manager	Manner of departure	Date of vacancy	Position in the table	Incoming manager	Date of appointment
Waterford	(England) Matt Lawlor (interim)	End of interim spell	16 November 2025	Pre-season	(Republic of Ireland) Jon Daly	16 November 2025
Waterford	(Republic of Ireland) Jon Daly	Sacked	2 May 2026	10th	(Republic of Ireland) Brian Murphy (interim)	2 May 2026
Waterford	(Republic of Ireland) Brian Murphy (interim)	End of interim spell	6 May 2026	10th	(Republic of Ireland) Graham Coughlan	6 May 2026
Shelbourne	(Republic of Ireland) Joey O'Brien	Sacked	25 June 2026	5th	(Republic of Ireland) Lorcan Fitzgerald (interim)	25 June 2026
Shelbourne	(Republic of Ireland) Lorcan Fitzgerald (interim)	End of interim spell	13 July 2026	5th	(Republic of Ireland) John Russell	13 July 2026
Sligo Rovers	(Republic of Ireland) John Russell	Compensated by Shelbourne	13 July 2026	10th	(Republic of Ireland) Ryan Casey (interim)	13 July 2026
Sligo Rovers	(Republic of Ireland) Ryan Casey (interim)	Departed to join Shelbourne	21 July 2026	10th	(Republic of Ireland) Declan Boyle (interim)	21 July 2026
Sligo Rovers	(Republic of Ireland) Declan Boyle (interim)	End of interim spell	24 July 2026	10th	(England) Darren Purse	24 July 2026
Derry City	(Northern Ireland) Tiernan Lynch	Sacked	5 August 2026	6th	(Republic of Ireland) Mark Connolly (interim)	5 August 2026

== League table ==
=== Standings ===
Pos	Team	Pld	W	D	L	GF	GA	GD	Pts	Qualification or relegation
1	Shamrock Rovers (C)	36	20	8	8	59	38	+21	68	Qualification for Champions League first qualifying round
2	Bohemians	36	19	8	9	63	44	+19	65	Qualification for Conference League second qualifying round
3	St Patrick's Athletic	36	17	9	10	55	31	+24	60	Qualification for Conference League first qualifying round
4	Shelbourne	36	12	13	11	52	50	+2	49	
5	Derry City	36	11	15	10	50	47	+3	48	Qualification for Europa League first qualifying round (Note: Derry City won the 2026 FAI Cup.)
6	Dundalk	36	11	12	13	55	59	−4	45	
7	Waterford	36	10	13	13	54	61	−7	43	
8	Galway United	36	10	12	14	46	53	−7	42	
9	Drogheda United (R)	36	10	10	16	44	57	−13	40	Qualification for promotion/relegation play-off
10	Sligo Rovers (R)	36	5	10	21	28	66	−38	25	Relegation to League of Ireland First Division

Source: League of Ireland
Rules for classification: 1) Points; 2) Goal difference; 3) Goals scored.
(C) Champions; (R) Relegated

=== Results ===
Teams play each other four times (twice at home and twice away).

Home \ Away	BOH	DER	DRO	DUN	GAL	SHM	SHE	SLI	STP	WAT
Bohemians		1–1	2–1	1–1	1–0	3–2	2–2	1–2	0–0	1–1
Bohemians		5–3	2–1	1–2	1–1	1–2	0–1	3–0	2–0	2–1
Derry City	0–1		2–2	2–2	1–1	1–0	1–2	2–1	0–0	4–2
Derry City	4–1		2–0	2–1	1–0	3–3	0–0	2–0	1–0	2–4
Drogheda United	0–0	1–0		1–1	2–3	0–0	1–2	1–0	1–3	2–0
Drogheda United	0–2	2–0		2–3	2–0	0–0	2–2	2–0	0–2	3–3
Dundalk	1–3	2–2	1–1		2–1	1–0	1–2	1–0	2–0	5–0
Dundalk	1–2	2–1	1–2		1–2	3–1	2–3	1–1	0–4	2–3
Galway United	2–4	2–1	0–1	2–2		1–3	1–1	1–0	2–2	4–3
Galway United	2–3	2–1	0–0	0–1		2–0	1–1	3–2	0–0	0–0
Shamrock Rovers	2–1	1–0	4–1	1–1	2–0		3–2	1–2	2–0	1–0
Shamrock Rovers	2–1	1–1	3–1	3–2	3–1		0–0	4–0	1–0	3–2
Shelbourne	0–0	1–2	3–4	2–3	1–1	2–2		0–0	2–3	2–1
Shelbourne	0–3	0–1	1–2	2–1	1–1	2–1		5–1	1–2	2–3
Sligo Rovers	0–4	0–0	2–1	2–0	1–4	0–2	0–1		1–1	2–0
Sligo Rovers	1–3	2–2	2–2	1–1	1–3	1–2	2–2		0–1	0–0
St Patrick's Athletic	3–1	0–0	4–1	4–0	1–0	0–1	0–1	4–1		4–1
St Patrick's Athletic	2–3	1–1	2–0	1–1	3–0	2–0	1–2	2–0		0–2
Waterford	0–1	2–2	2–1	3–3	1–1	1–1	1–1	0–0	0–2	
Waterford	3–1	2–2	3–1	1–1	3–2	0–2	1–0	4–0	1–1	

Source: League of Ireland
Legend: Blue = home team win; Yellow = draw; Red = away team win.
For upcoming matches, an "a" indicates there is an article about the rivalry between the two participants.

== Positions by round ==
To preserve chronological evolution, any postponed matches are not included in the round at which they were originally scheduled, but added to the full round they were played immediately afterward. For example, if a match is scheduled for round 7, but then played between rounds 8 and 9, it will be added to the standings for round 8.

Team ╲ Round	1	2	3	4	5	6	7	8	9	10	11	12	13	14	15	16	17	18	19	20	21	22	23	24	25	26	27	28	29	30	31	32	33	34	35	36
Shamrock Rovers	7	8	3	6	3	3	3	3	3	3	1	1	2	1	1	1	1	1	1	1	1	1	1	1	1	1	1	1	1	1	2	2	1	1	1	1
Bohemians	5	2	1	1	1	1	1	1	2	2	3	4	4	3	3	3	3	3	2	3	3	2	2	2	3	3	3	3	3	3	3	3	3	2	2	2
St Patrick's Athletic	5	6	9	2	2	2	2	2	1	1	2	2	1	2	2	2	2	2	3	2	2	3	3	3	2	2	2	2	2	2	1	1	2	3	3	3
Shelbourne	3	5	6	5	6	4	5	4	5	6	6	7	8	6	6	7	5	5	5	5	5	5	5	5	5	5	5	5	5	6	7	6	4	4	4	4
Derry City	1	3	4	3	4	6	6	6	8	7	7	5	5	5	5	5	6	6	6	6	6	6	6	6	6	6	6	6	6	5	5	4	5	5	5	5
Dundalk	7	4	5	8	8	5	4	5	4	4	4	3	3	4	4	4	4	4	4	4	4	4	4	4	4	4	4	4	4	4	4	5	6	6	7	6
Waterford	3	7	7	9	10	10	10	10	10	10	10	10	10	10	10	10	10	10	10	10	10	10	9	9	9	9	8	8	8	8	8	8	8	8	8	7
Galway United	10	9	8	7	7	8	7	8	6	5	5	6	6	7	7	8	7	7	7	7	7	7	7	7	7	7	7	7	7	7	6	7	7	7	6	8
Drogheda United	2	1	2	4	5	7	8	7	7	8	8	9	9	8	8	6	8	8	8	8	8	8	8	8	8	8	9	9	9	9	9	9	9	9	9	9
Sligo Rovers	9	10	10	10	9	9	9	9	9	9	9	8	7	9	9	9	9	9	9	9	9	9	10	10	10	10	10	10	10	10	10	10	10	10	10	10

Leader and qualification for Champions League first qualifying round
Qualification for Conference League second qualifying round
Qualification for Conference League first qualifying round
Qualification for promotion/relegation play-off
Relegation to League of Ireland First Division

Updated to match(es) played on 30 October 2026. Source: Extra Time

== Season statistics ==
As of matches played on 30 October 2026

=== Top scorers ===
Rank	Player	Club	Goals
1	(Republic of Ireland) Tommy Lonergan	Waterford	16
2	(Republic of Ireland) Pádraig Amond	Waterford	15
3	(Republic of Ireland) Colm Whelan	Bohemians	13
4	(Republic of Ireland) Daryl Horgan	Dundalk	12
4	(Republic of Ireland) Michael Duffy	Derry City	12
6	(Republic of Ireland) Mark Doyle	Drogheda United	11
6	(Republic of Ireland) Ross Tierney	Bohemians	11
8	(England) Ryan Edmondson	St Patrick's Athletic	10
8	(Republic of Ireland) Aidan Keena	St Patrick's Athletic	10
10	(Northern Ireland) John McGovern	Shamrock Rovers	9
10	(Republic of Ireland) Graham Burke	Shamrock Rovers	9
10	(England) Harry Wood	Shelbourne	9

==== Hat-tricks ====
Player	For	Against	Result	Date	Ref.
(Republic of Ireland) Colm Whelan	Bohemians	Sligo Rovers	4–0 (A)	14 February 2026	
(Republic of Ireland) Michael Duffy	Derry City	Waterford	4–2 (H)	27 February 2026	
(Republic of Ireland) Pádraig Amond	Waterford	Sligo Rovers	4–0 (H)	12 June 2026	

=== Clean sheets ===
Rank	Player	Club	Clean sheets
1	(Republic of Ireland) Edward McGinty	Shamrock Rovers	12
2	(Ghana) Joseph Anang	St Patrick's Athletic	11
3	(Wales) Eddie Beach	Derry City/Shelbourne	8
4	(United States) Luke Dennison	Drogheda United	7
4	(Poland) Kacper Chorążka	Bohemians	7
6	(Northern Ireland) Stephen McMullan	Waterford	6
6	(England) Sam Sargeant	Sligo Rovers	6
8	(Netherlands) Wessel Speel	Shelbourne	5
9	(England) Fynn Talley	Drogheda United	4
9	(Portugal) Hugo Cunha	Galway United	4
9	(United States) Paul Walters	Bohemians	4
9	(Republic of Ireland) Enda Minogue	Dundalk	4

=== Discipline ===
==== Player ====
- Most yellow cards: 11
  - (Republic of Ireland) Dawson Devoy (Bohemians)
  - (Republic of Ireland) Daniel Kelly (Shelbourne)
  - (Republic of Ireland) Keith Buckley (Dundalk)
  - (Republic of Ireland) Matt Healy (Shamrock Rovers)
- Most red cards: 2
  - (Cape Verde) Pico Lopes (Shamrock Rovers)

==== Club ====
- Most yellow cards: 108
  - Shelbourne
- Most red cards: 7
  - Dundalk

== Awards ==
=== Monthly awards ===
Month	Player of the Month		Goal of the Month		References
Month	Player	Club	Player	Club	References
February	(Republic of Ireland) Michael Duffy	Derry City	(Northern Ireland) Eoin Kenny	Dundalk	
March	(United States) Patrick Hickey	Bohemians	(Republic of Ireland) Jack Henry-Francis	Shelbourne	
April	(Republic of Ireland) Will Fitzgerald	Sligo Rovers	(Republic of Ireland) Stephen Walsh	Galway United	

== See also ==
- 2026 League of Ireland First Division
- 2026 League of Ireland Women's Premier Division
- 2026 FAI National League
- 2026 FAI Cup
