= Goal of the Season (Ireland) =

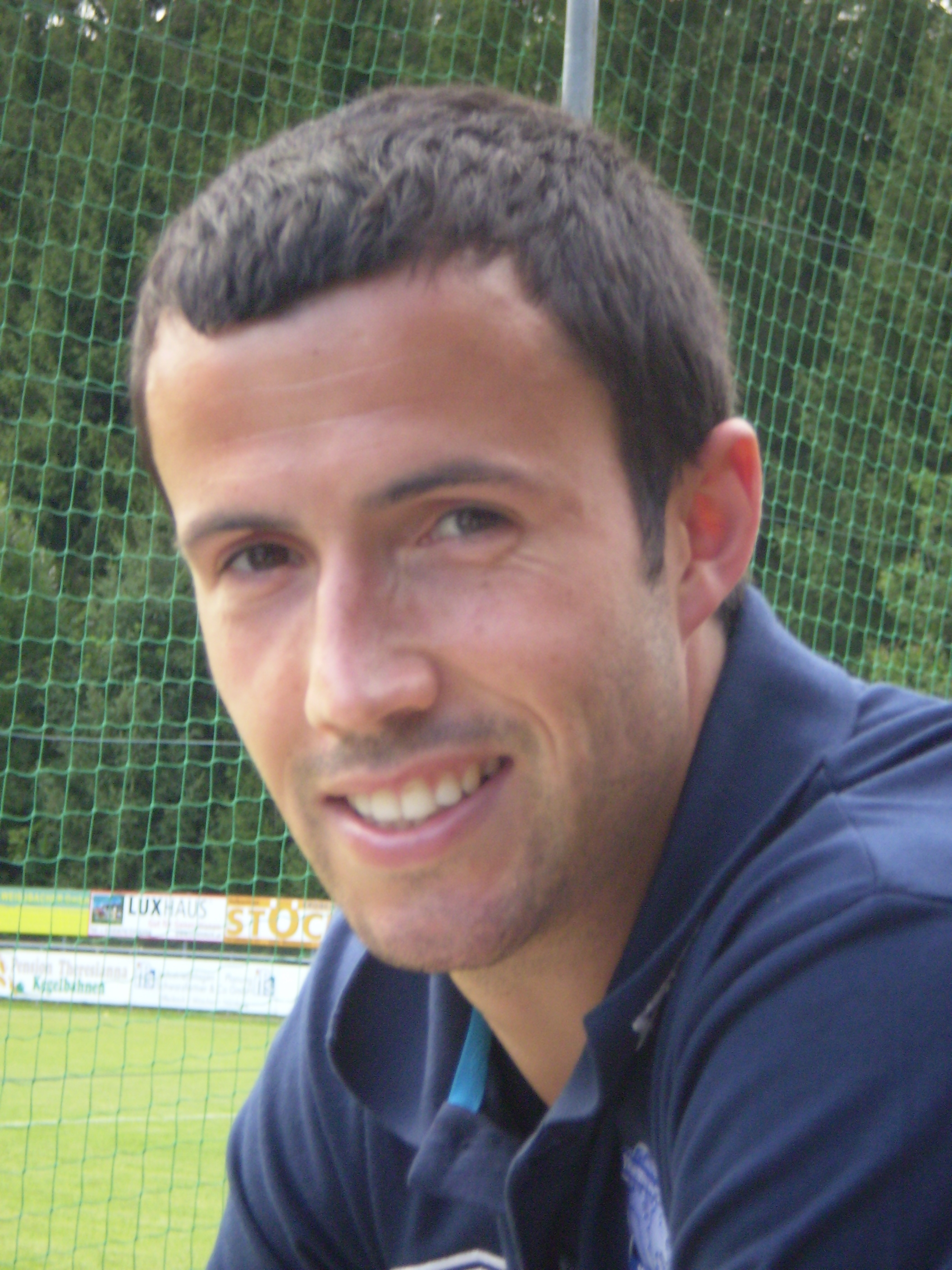
Keith Fahey was the first winner of the RTÉ Goal of the Season Award

The Goal of the Season award is handed out annually to the best goal scored in the League of Ireland in that particular year. Previously awarded by the eircom League Weekly team on TV3, since the league's highlights show has been shown on Monday Night Soccer, the award is now given by members of RTÉ Sport. The first winner of the award from RTÉ was Keith Fahey for his 35-yard strike against Bohemians at Dalymount Park during the 2008 League of Ireland season.

== List of winners ==
Season	Scorer	For	Against	Stadium	Competition	Date	Commentator
2008	Keith Fahey	St Patrick's Athletic	Bohemians	Dalymount Park	League of Ireland Premier Division	14 March 2008	Darragh Maloney
2009	Michael McGowan	Dundalk	Derry City	Oriel Park	League of Ireland Premier Division	6 November 2009	Ryle Nugent
2010							
2011							
2012							
