= David Macmillan =

British historian

David Neil Stirling Macmillan (9 October 1925 – 4 September 1987) was a British historian.

Macmillan was born in Airdrie, Scotland on 9 October 1925. He earned a master's degree from the University of Glasgow in 1949, and a PhD from the University of Sydney, Australia in 1965.

Macmillan served as a professional archivist. He was the first University Archivist to be appointed by the University of Sydney. He subsequently moved to Trent University in Ontario, Canada, where he was a professor for 20 years.

Macmillan very likely stole more than 3,000 historical documents over 30 years from the National Records of Scotland, and other archives including the National Archives and those of the University of Glasgow, the University of Edinburgh and the National Library of Scotland. He was seemingly driven by "an all-consuming interest in stamps." His thefts were the subject of news publicity in March 2025. He began stealing documents in 1949, and had his rights to the archives revoked after being caught stealing in 1981, though the scale of the thefts was not revealed until decades later. 200 items from the National Records of Scotland were discovered at an auction in London in 1994, at which the historian's estate was to be sold. Some items were still marked with their NRS reference numbers.
