= Derbies in the League of Ireland =

Certain matches in League of Ireland soccer

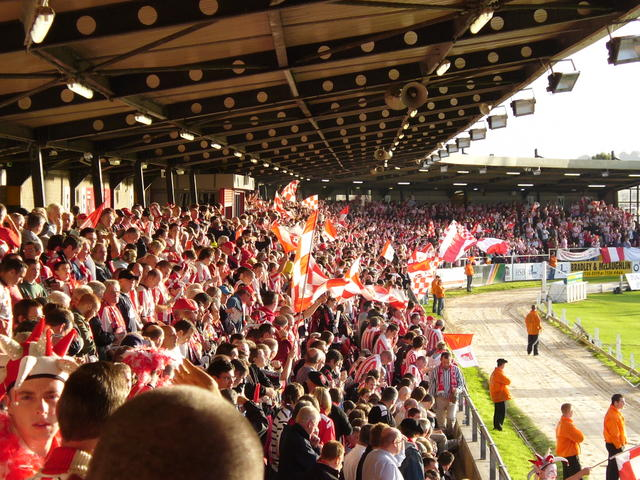
The Brandywell has often held The Northwest Derby, played between Derry City and Finn Harps

There are many derbies in the League of Ireland and, while more teams historically compete in the First Division, the majority have been played in the Premier Division, the top flight of Irish football.

== Background ==
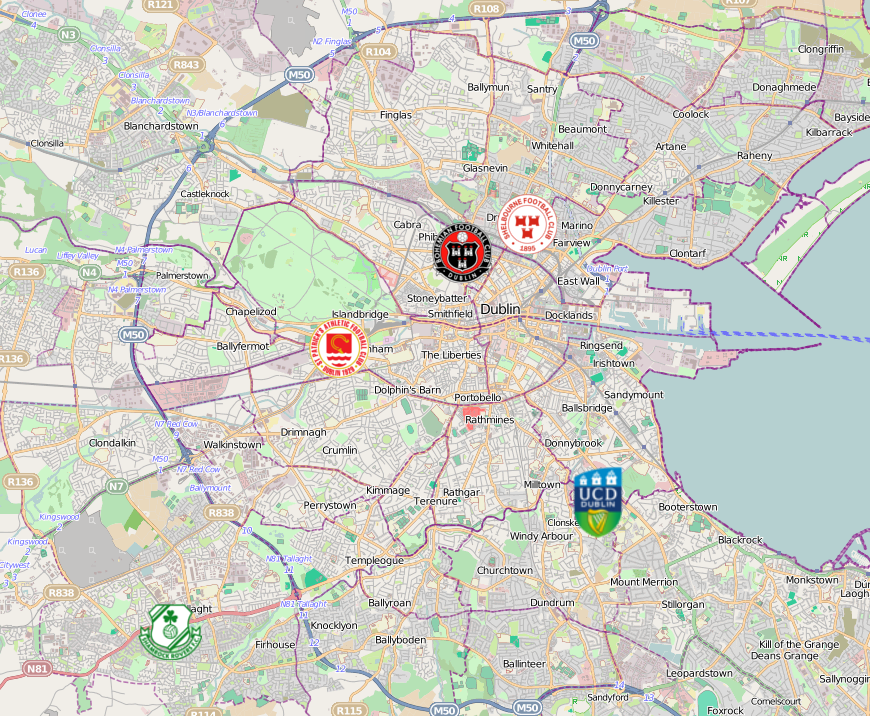
Locations of Dublin-based League of Ireland clubs

Founded in 1921, the League of Ireland is the national association football league of the Republic of Ireland. Formed by the Football Association of Ireland out of split with the Irish Football Association for the first 65 years it consisted of a single division. However, since the mid 1980s, it has expanded into a two tier system with a Premier Division and First Division.

Most derbies in the league occur due to close geographical proximity, with a number of clubs based in Dublin. However, there are also rivalries between other city clubs outside the capital such as Cork City vs Limerick and Drogheda United vs Dundalk. These clubs also maintain rivalries with the Dublin-based clubs.

The earliest derby contested was between Bohemian and Shelbourne, Dublin based clubs who played in the Belfast-dominated Irish Football League from the early 1900s to 1920, and in the late 19th century in the Leinster Senior League. They never won the Irish League title, but they did win four Irish Cups between them, three for Shels, one for Bohs. After the foundation of the League of Ireland in 1921, this rivalry continued along with newly formed rivalries between Shamrock Rovers and St James' Gate, with the four clubs winning all of the league's first eleven titles between them.

In the 1950s and 1960s, matches between North Dublin-based Drumcondra and South Dublin based Shamrock Rovers became the premier event in the league's calendar, until Drumcondra went out of business in 1972. Outside of Dublin, Cork Celtic and Cork Hibernians enjoyed a rivalry in the 1960s. Today, the Bohemians-Shamrock Rovers fixture is considered the main rivalry in the league by the media.

There are also several non-geographical rivalries such as Cork City and Shelbourne in the 2000s, or Shamrock Rovers and Sligo Rovers in the 2010s which stem from title battles.

League of Ireland sides also have rivalries with their Northern Irish club counterparts and have often met in cross-border competitions, the latest being the Setanta Sports Cup. They can also meet in European Qualifying Rounds, this has happened on four occasions in the European Cup/Champions League with Waterford United overcoming Glentoran in 1970–71, Dundalk beating Linfield in 1979–80, Shamrock Rovers losing to Linfield in 1984–85, Shelbourne defeating Glentoran in 2005–06 and Cork City knocked out Linfield from the Europa League qualifiers in 2016.

== Capital Derbies ==
With four Dublin based clubs currently competing in the league, and a number of defunct clubs over the years, the city of Dublin hosts a number of derbies each season.

=== Bohemians vs Shamrock Rovers (Dublin Derby) ===
Dublin Derby results from 1922-23 season to 2022 season ^{[1]}. Updated as of 02/09/2022.
Played	Bohemians won	Draw	Shamrock Rovers won
244	74	63	107

Bohemians and Shamrock rovers are often considered to have the biggest rivalry in the league, with their games being referred to simply as the Dublin Derby, a term that historically has also been applied to games between Rovers and Shelbourne. Following the demise of Drumcondra in the 1970s, Bohemians became the only major club from the Northside of Dublin, automatically coming into conflict with southsiders, Shamrock Rovers. Since the 1990s, the rivalry has been fierce both on and off the field, with disturbances sometimes breaking out before, during and after fixtures, resulting in a large Garda presence at some games. The attendances at the game had been declining for thirty years, but attendances rose in 2009, largely due to Rovers moving into Tallaght Stadium and Bohs' status as league champions, with the attendance at one game tripling on the previous encounter. The rivalry features elements of the North-South cultural divide that exists in the city.

In 2016, during an away 4-0 win for Rovers, fans from both side invaded the pitch, and fighting was reported. The Garda Public Order unit intervened.

=== Bohemians vs Shelbourne (Northside Derby) ===
Northside derby head to head league results from 1921-22 season to 2022 season ^{[1]}. Updated as of end of 19/08/2022.
Played	Bohemians won	Draw	Shelbourne won
204	88	42	75

The oldest derby in the league, and the original "Dublin derby", Bohemians and Shelbourne are the only still functioning clubs from the original 1922 League of Ireland season and completely dominated early pre-Irish Republic league football; they competed together in the Leinster Senior League and the old Belfast-centred (now Northern) Irish Football League. The first major dispute between the clubs goes back as far as the Leinster Senior Cup final in 1903. With the two sides scheduled to meet in the regional cup final, Shels objected to the referee appointment claiming a lack of impartiality. Shels refused to play and the trophy was awarded for the only time in its long history without the final being played. Shels ended up having to pay expenses for the loss of gate receipts on threat of suspension from football.

By the mid-2020s, they are the fourth and joint second most successful league sides and while the rivalry receded over the years at the start of the 2000s it reached its most heated as the two became the best clubs in the country winning between each other six consecutive titles. Ahead of the final game of the 2004 season, Shelbourne chairman Ollie Byrne announced the signing of three key Bohemians players live on RTÉ - angering many Bohs fans who saw it as a tactic of buying up the opposition. Subsequently, after Byrne's death and Shelbourne's demotion due to financial insecurities, Bohemians signed a number of Shelbourne players.

At the end of the 2023 League of Ireland Premier Division season, Shels had finished in fourth which would be enough to qualify for European football if St Patrick's were to beat Bohemians, who had finished sixth, in the 2023 FAI Cup final. After Bohs final league game, their manager Declan Devine told their fans "Shelbourne can celebrate all they want tonight but we’re bringing that Cup back here". Bohs lost the final 1:3, and Shels qualified for the UEFA Conference League instead.

The rivalry is significant as their home grounds in North Dublin are the closest to each other of any clubs in the league at around 1.5 kilometres apart. With Shelbourne based at Tolka Park in Drumcondra, and Bohemians at Dalymount Park in Phibsboro, the game is sometimes referred to as the Northside derby. However, Shelbourne were actually formed in Ringsend in South Dublin and only took over the lease of Tolka Park in 1989 (although they had played there going back to the 1950s). This adds to the feud as they are seen as moving to Bohs territory. In the Irish League days, the rivalry was seen as class based, as Shels had to pay their predominantly working class players, whereas Bohs maintained a glass ceiling with their amateur status up until 1969.

Despite the move to Tolka initially coinciding with a revival in Shels fortunes (they have won 7 of their 14 league titles and four of their seven FAI Cups since 1989), they have struggled to attract significant support on the Northside with only Marino and East Wall being seen as stronger bases for supporting Shels over Bohs. However, Shels do enjoy support in a number of Northside suburban areas. By the end of 2024 however, Shels had overtaken Bohs in average home league attendances.

Before the first derby in the 2026 season, two separate brawls broke out on the pitch at Tolka Park.

Shels also enjoy the bragging rights to a world record breaking hat-trick scored by Jimmy O'Connor in just two minutes thirteen seconds when Shels were two down to Bohs in a league match at Dalymount Park in 1967, which Shels subsequently won 3:2.

=== Shamrock Rovers vs St. Patrick's Athletic (Southside Derby) ===
Luas derby head to head league results from 1922-23 season to 2023 season. Updated as of the end of the 2023 season.
Played	Shamrock Rovers won	Draw	St Patrick's Athletic won
188	80	50	58

A rivalry grew between these two clubs - owing to proximity - after Shamrock Rovers' move to Tallaght in 2009. These games have sometimes been called the 'Luas Derby' as both Inchicore and Tallaght are served by the Luas Red line. Noted as one of the more colourful derbies, both clubs main fan group (SRFC Ultras and Shed End Invincibles) were formed in 2001 before others in the league.

=== Shelbourne vs St. Patrick's Athletic (Red Derby) ===
Red derby head to head league results from 1951-52 season to 2023 season. Updated as of end of the 2023 season.
Played	Shelbourne won	Draw	St Patrick's Athletic won
145	56	35	54

Games between Shelbourne and St. Pats are sometimes referred to as the Red Dublin Derby - due to the similar shirts they wear.

The fixture itself held little of note until the 1990s. With St Pat's as runaway league champions, the two sides met in the 1996 FAI Cup Final at Lansdowne Road with the Saints seeking a first ever double. Despite falling behind, having their goalkeeper Alan Gough sent off and a midfielder (Brian Flood) in goal for most of the match, Tony Sheridan forced a replay at the death for Shels. In the replay at Dalymount Park a week later, Pat's took the lead again, Shels equalised again, and then Alan Gough, back in goal after the previous week's red card, saved a late penalty before Shels broke to win the cup from the subsequent Pat's corner.

During the 2001-02 season, St. Pat's were deducted 9 points for fielding an ineligible player. These were reinstated before 15 points were deducted for fielding another unregistered player pushing St. Pat's from 1st place to 3rd and meaning Shels would win the title.

Matters on and off the field between the two clubs in the late 1990s and early 2000s were dominated by ongoing rows between Shels CEO Ollie Byrne and St Pat's manager and CEO Pat Dolan.

In 2022, St Patrick's announced they couldn't fulfil a derby claiming they had been stranded after a European tie. The game was postponed by the League causing huge controversy. When the game was finally played, it finished 4:4.

Due to the prominence of the Bohemians-Shamrock Rovers rivalry, the media sometimes portrays this as the second most important in Dublin.

=== Shamrock Rovers vs Shelbourne (Ringsend Derby) ===
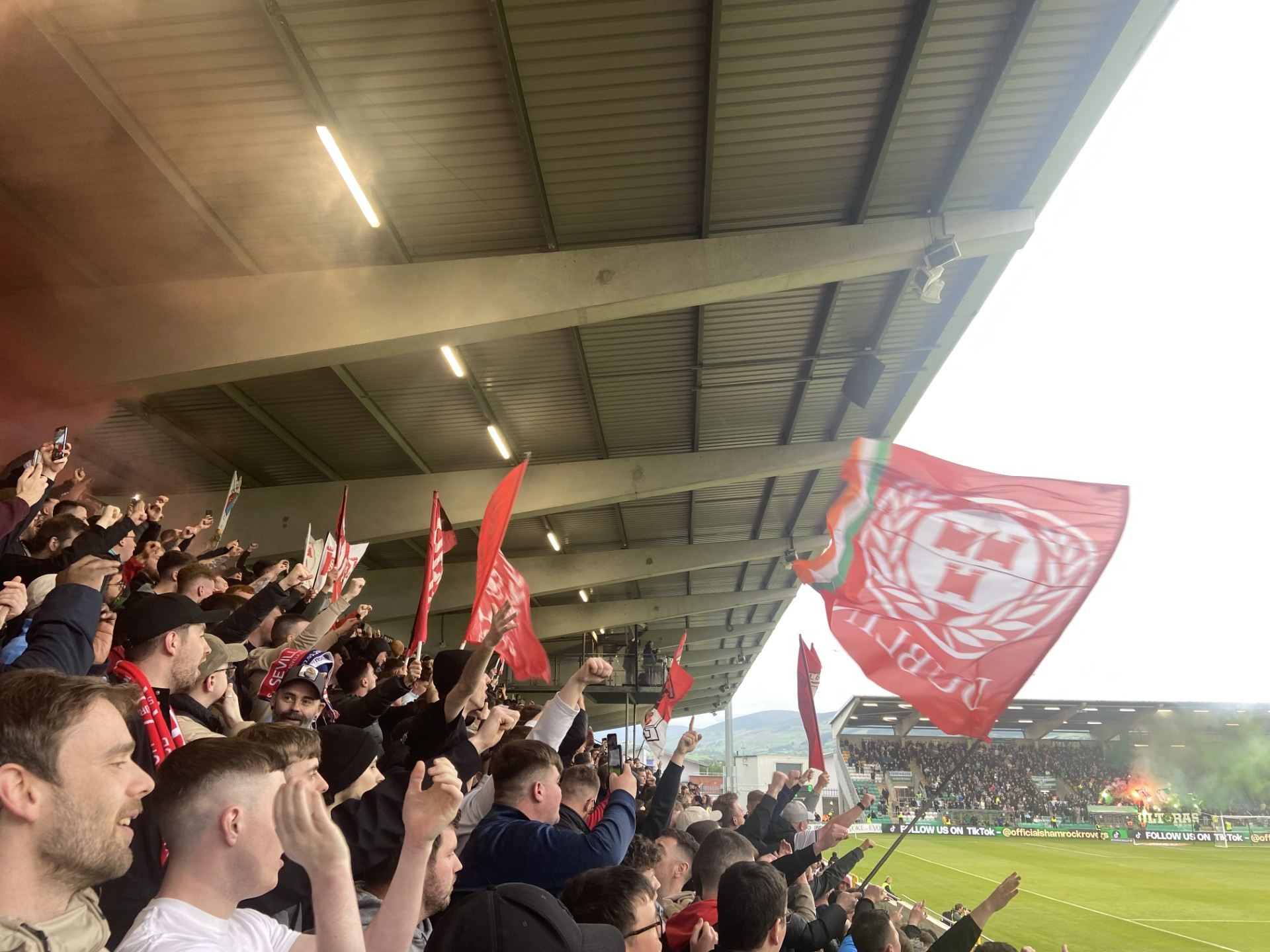
Shelbourne fans in Tallaght Stadium for the Ringsend derby with Shamrock Rovers fans in the background 24 May 2024

Ringsend derby head to head league results from 1922-23 season to 2022 season ^{[1]}. Updated as of end of 27/05/2022.
Played	Shamrock Rovers won	Draw	Shelbourne won
193	79	48	66

This rivalry is contested by the first and joint second most successful League of Ireland sides with 21 and 14 titles respectively, however both clubs see Bohemians as bigger rivals.

It is named after the Ringsend area in the Eastern part of the Southside of Dublin where both clubs were founded. Despite both clubs now playing further afield, their clubs names originate from Ringsend with Shelbourne taking their name from Shelbourne Road, and Shamrock Rovers’ name coming from Shamrock Avenue. Both clubs take pride in their origins and at recent fixtures between the two have held up banners claiming to be ‘Ringsend's Number One’ (Shels) and 'The Pride of Ringsend’ (Rovers).

=== Bohemians vs St Patrick's Athletic (City Derby) ===
City derby head to head league results from 1951-52 season to 2023 season . Updated as of the end of the 2023 season.
Played	Bohemians won	Draw	St Patrick's Athletic won
188	62	52	74

Sometimes considered the most placid rivalry between the big four, both clubs originally played in the Phoenix Park but quickly moved to nearby Phibsboro and Inchicore. The two had rarely been competitive for the title at the same times as each other until the 2020s and both see Shamrock Rovers and Shelbourne as more important rivals. The clubs met in the 2021 FAI Cup Final which St Patrick's Athletic won on penalties amidst pre match crowd trouble in Irishtown. The two met again in the 2023 FAI Cup Final which again saw the Saints lift the trophy, after a 3–1 victory in front of a record domestic crowd of 43,881.

=== UCD vs the Big Four ===
City derby head to head league results from 1951-52 season to 2022 season . Updated as of 19/08/2022.
Played	UCD won	Draw	Opponent won
82	15	19	48 (Bohemians)
76	9	23	44 (Shamrock Rovers)
64	12	17	35 (Shelbourne)
82	12	34	37 (St Patrick's Athletic)

UCD's support base consists of a few hundred fans which means during derbies at UCD Bowl there is often more away fans than home supporters.

== Provincial Derbies ==
=== Munster Derby: Cork City v Limerick FC / Cork City v Waterford United ===
Munster Derbies have been traditionally contested between the larger Munster clubs, including Cork City, Limerick FC and Waterford F.C.

=== Northwest Derby: Derry City vs Finn Harps ===
Northwest derby head to head league results from 1996-97 season to 2022 season ^{[1]}. Updated as of 17/07/2022.
Played	Derry City won	Draw	Finn Harps won
39	25	9	5

Derry City F.C. (based in the Brandywell in Derry) and Finn Harps (based in Ballybofey in County Donegal) are approximately 30 miles apart. In a promotion/relegation play-off match between the two teams in 2003, in which Derry were the victors, the attendance was over 6,000. With Harps promotion for the 2008 season, it returned with great anticipation and the three meetings were all sold out. Derry came out on top on all three occasions. The derby returned in 2010, following Derry's relegation from the Premier Division the previous year, with Derry also holding an advantage over the Donegal men in all these ties.

=== Louth Derby: Drogheda United vs Dundalk FC ===
Louth derby head to head league results from 1963-64 season to 2022 season ^{[1]}. Updated as of 23/06/2023.
Played	Drogheda United won	Draw	Dundalk won
105	22	25	58

The Louth Derby is contested by Drogheda United and Dundalk. The derby had not been played in many years due to the clubs being in different divisions. Many of Dundalk's most successful periods have corresponded with Drogheda being at the lower end of the league table or in the First Division, while Drogheda's most successful period (between 2004 and 2008) occurred while Dundalk were in the lower tier. During the 2017 League Of Ireland Premier Division, the fixture produced 4 red cards in 4 matches. Since Drogheda's promotion from the First Division in 2020, it has been evenly contested 10 times (including friendlies), resulting in 6 Dundalk wins and 4 Drogheda wins.

=== Connacht Derby: Galway United vs Sligo Rovers ===
Connacht derby head to head league results from 1977-78 season to 2024 season ^{[1]}. Updated as of 26-05-2024.
Played	Galway United won	Draw	Sligo Rovers won
64	15	20	29

The Connacht Derby is played between Galway United and Sligo Rovers. Traditionally it had been a First Division derby but the success of both clubs meant it became a regular Premier Division encounter. Both teams regularly beat each other, resulting in an almost exact record for both, however in the Premier Division Sligo have come out on top most times.

== Other derbies ==
There are several other derbies and rivalries in Irish football, including:

- The Cork Derby - Cork City vs Cobh Ramblers
- The East Coast Derby - Bray Wanderers vs Wexford
- The Midlands Derby - Longford Town vs Athlone Town
- The Rovers Derby - Shamrock Rovers vs Sligo Rovers
- The Southeast Derby - Wexford vs Waterford
- The Plummer Derby - Kerry vs Treaty United

== Former rivalries ==
Drumcondra vs Shamrock Rovers
Was seen as the biggest rivalry between North and South Dublin but ended with the five times League of Ireland Champions and winners of five FAI Cup finals Drumcondra going out of business in 1972 and amalgamated with Home Farm. Most of Drums support floated to nearby Phibsborough with Bohemians who had dropped their strict amateur status in 1969 allowing them to become a major force in Irish football again.

Northside-Southside derby head to head league results from 1928-29 season to 1971-72 season ^{[1]}.
Club	Played	Won	Draw	Lost	Goals For	Goals Away	Goals +/-	Win %	Points ave.

Drumcondra	88	21	20	47	207	124	-83	33.33	1.30

Shamrock Rovers	88	47	20	21	207	124	+83	53.41	1.83

Cork Celtic vs Cork Hibernians
Contested from the 1950s to mid 1970s. Hibernians only won one of the first 18 league fixtures but enjoyed a better record before resigning from the league losing only one of the last 14 fixtures.

Cork derby head to head league results from 1959-60 season to 1975-76 season ^{[1]}.
Club	Played	Won	Draw	Lost	Goals For	Goals Away	Goals +/-	Win %	Points ave.

Cork Celtic	32	13	7	12	46	50	-4	40.65	1.44

Cork Hibernians	32	12	7	13	50	46	+4	37.50	1.34

== Notes ==
1. ^{[1]} Record of league games only. From 1921-22 season till 1984-85 there was only one division. Since 1985-86 there has been two divisions, the statistics here include only matches played in the top flight.
2. ^{[2]} Home Farm's record contains one season named as Home Farm Drumcondra and one season named Home Farm Everton
3. ^{[3]} After their first three seasons in the League of Ireland Transport moved from Bray to Dublin. Transport's record only features their results since the move to Dublin.
4. ^{[4]} Dublin City results feature 5 matches from 2006 season (2 losses to Shelbourne, 1 loss to both Bohemian and St Patrick's Athletic, and 1 victory over UCD). Club dissolved during season and results expunged.
