= 2017 League of Ireland Premier Division =

League of Ireland Premier Division
- Season: 2017
- Dates: 24 February – 27 October 2017
- Champions: Cork City (3rd title)
- Relegated: Drogheda United; Finn Harps; Galway United
- Champions League: Cork City
- Europa League: Dundalk; Shamrock Rovers; Derry City
- Matches: 198
- Goals: 549 (2.77 per match)
- Top goalscorer: Sean Maguire, Cork City 20
- Biggest home win: Dundalk 6–0 St Patrick's Athletic
- Biggest away win: Drogheda United 0–6 Dundalk
- Highest scoring: Bray Wanderers 5–3 Finn Harps Limerick 5-3 Bray Wanderers
- Longest winning run: Cork City (12 games)
- Longest unbeaten run: Cork City (22 games)
- Longest winless run: Drogheda United (21 games)
- Longest losing run: Drogheda United (9 games)
- Highest attendance: 6,983 Cork City 1–1 Dundalk
- Total attendance: 377,362
- Average attendance: 1,906
- All statistics correct as of 4 November 2017.

The 2017 League of Ireland Premier Division was the 33rd season of the League of Ireland Premier Division. The league began on Friday 24 February 2017 and concluded on 27 October 2017. Fixtures were announced on 9 December 2016. Due to the decision to reduce the number of clubs in the Premier Division from 12 to 10, starting from the following season, three clubs were to be relegated.

On 17 October, Cork City won the title after a 0-0 draw at home to Derry City.

== Overview ==
The Premier Division consists of 12 teams. Each team plays each other three times for a total of 33 matches in the season.

Limerick, the 2016 First Division champion and Drogheda United, winners of the promotion/relegation playoffs, were promoted to the league, both bouncing straight back after having been relegated the previous season.

On 22 December 2016, the Football Association of Ireland announced that the league would be restructured into two 10-team divisions from the 2018 season onwards, one of the recommendations made in the 2015 Conroy Report. This meant the cancellation of the promotion/relegation playoff and relegation at the end of the 2017 season of 3 teams, with only the champions of the First Division promoted in return.

== Teams ==
=== Stadia and locations ===
Locations of Premier Division teams
Locations of Dublin Premier Division teams

Team	Location	Stadium
Bohemians	Phibsborough	Dalymount Park
Bray Wanderers	Bray	Carlisle Grounds
Cork City	Cork	Turners Cross
Derry City	Buncrana	Maginn Park
Drogheda United	Drogheda	United Park
Dundalk	Dundalk	Oriel Park
Finn Harps	Ballybofey	Finn Park
Galway United	Galway	Eamonn Deacy Park
Limerick	Limerick	Markets Field
Shamrock Rovers	Tallaght	Tallaght Stadium
Sligo Rovers	Sligo	The Showgrounds
St Patrick's Athletic	Inchicore	Richmond Park

=== Personnel and kits ===
Note: Flags indicate national team as has been defined under FIFA eligibility rules. Players may hold more than one non-FIFA nationality.

Team	Manager	Captain	Kit manufacturer	Shirt sponsor
Bohemians	(Republic of Ireland) Keith Long	(Republic of Ireland) Derek Pender	Hummel	Mr Green
Bray Wanderers	(Republic of Ireland) Harry Kenny	(Republic of Ireland) Conor Kenna	Nike	Sonas Bathrooms
Cork City	(Republic of Ireland) John Caulfield	(Republic of Ireland) John Dunleavy	Nike	University College Cork
Derry City	(Northern Ireland) Kenny Shiels	(Northern Ireland) Gerard Doherty	Hummel	Diamond Corrugated
Drogheda United	(Republic of Ireland) Pete Mahon	(Republic of Ireland) Sean Thornton	CX+ Sport	Scotch Hall Shopping Center
Dundalk	(Republic of Ireland) Stephen Kenny	(Republic of Ireland) Stephen O'Donnell	CX+ Sport	Fyffes
Finn Harps	(Republic of Ireland) Ollie Horgan	(Republic of Ireland) Ciaran Coll	Joma	McGettigan Group
Galway United	(Republic of Ireland) Shane Keegan	(Republic of Ireland) Colm Horgan	Uhlsport	Comer Property Management
Limerick	(England) Neil McDonald	(Republic of Ireland) Shane Duggan	Hummel	
Shamrock Rovers	(Republic of Ireland) Stephen Bradley	(Republic of Ireland) Ronan Finn	New Balance	Pepper Asset Servicing
Sligo Rovers	(Northern Ireland) Gerard Lyttle	(England) Craig Roddan	Joma	Volkswagen
St Patrick's Athletic	(Republic of Ireland) Liam Buckley	(Republic of Ireland) Ian Bermingham	Umbro	Pieta House

=== Managerial changes ===
Team	Outgoing manager	Manner of departure	Date of vacancy	Position in table	Incoming manager	Date of appointment
Limerick	(Republic of Ireland) Martin Russell	Mutual consent	3 April 2017	8th	(England) Neil McDonald	18 May 2017
Sligo Rovers	(England) Dave Robertson	Mutual consent	5 April 2017	11th	(Northern Ireland) Gerard Lyttle	21 April 2017

== League table ==
Pos	Team	Pld	W	D	L	GF	GA	GD	Pts	Qualification or relegation
1	Cork City (C)	33	24	4	5	67	23	+44	76	Qualification for Champions League first qualifying round
2	Dundalk	33	22	3	8	72	24	+48	69	Qualification for Europa League first qualifying round
3	Shamrock Rovers	33	17	3	13	49	41	+8	54	Qualification for Europa League first qualifying round
4	Derry City	33	14	9	10	49	40	+9	51	Qualification for Europa League first qualifying round
5	Bohemians	33	14	5	14	36	40	−4	47	
6	Bray Wanderers	33	13	7	13	55	52	+3	46	
7	Limerick	33	10	10	13	41	51	−10	40	
8	St Patrick's Athletic	33	9	12	12	45	52	−7	39	
9	Sligo Rovers	33	8	15	10	33	44	−11	39	
10	Galway United (R)	33	7	14	12	45	50	−5	35	Relegation to League of Ireland First Division
11	Finn Harps (R)	33	9	3	21	35	67	−32	30	Relegation to League of Ireland First Division
12	Drogheda United (R)	33	5	7	21	22	65	−43	22	Relegation to League of Ireland First Division

Source: SSE Airtricity League, Soccerway
Rules for classification: 1) Points; 2) Goal difference; 3) Goals scored.
(C) Champions; (R) Relegated

== Results ==
=== Matches 1–22 ===
Teams played each other twice (once at home, once away).

Home \ Away	BOH	BRW	COR	DER	DRO	DUN	FHA	GAL	LIM	STP	SHM	SLI
Bohemians	—	3–2	0–2	1–4	0–0	0–1	2–0	1–1	1–2	0–4	0–2	2–0
Bray Wanderers	1–2	—	0–2	3–2	2–1	0–3	5–3	1–0	0–1	1–1	4–2	2–2
Cork City	0–1	2–1	—	3–0	5–0	2–1	5–0	4–0	4–1	1–0	4–1	2–1
Derry City	2–0	2–3	1–2	—	4–0	3–1	0–2	2–1	1–1	2–2	3–1	4–0
Drogheda United	0–1	0–0	1–4	0–0	—	0–6	0–2	2–2	0–2	2–0	2–1	1–1
Dundalk	2–0	1–3	0–3	0–0	3–1	—	4–0	2–0	1–0	3–0	2–1	4–0
Finn Harps	2–1	0–3	0–1	0–2	0–2	0–2	—	1–1	3–2	3–1	0–1	2–1
Galway United	1–2	1–2	1–1	0–0	0–1	2–1	2–1	—	3–1	1–1	1–2	1–1
Limerick	0–1	5–3	0–3	1–1	3–0	0–3	1–1	1–1	—	2–2	0–2	5–1
St Patrick's Athletic	1–3	1–2	0–3	2–1	2–0	0–2	1–2	1–1	0–2	—	2–1	1–1
Shamrock Rovers	2–1	2–0	1–2	0–1	4–1	2–1	3–2	2–0	1–1	1–1	—	1–0
Sligo Rovers	2–0	3–2	1–2	1–1	1–1	0–4	0–0	1–1	3–0	1–1	1–0	—

Source: SSE Airtricity League, Soccerway
Legend: Blue = home team win; Yellow = draw; Red = away team win.
For upcoming matches, an "a" indicates there is an article about the rivalry between the two participants.

=== Matches 23–33 ===
Teams played each other once.

Home \ Away	BOH	BRW	COR	DER	DRO	DUN	FHA	GAL	LIM	STP	SHM	SLI
Bohemians	—	0–1	0–0	0–1	—	—	3–1	1–1	—	3–2	—	—
Bray Wanderers	—	—	—	—	2–1	—	2–3	3–3	1–1	—	1–0	—
Cork City	—	1–0	—	0–0	—	1–1	—	2–1	—	—	—	0–1
Derry City	—	0–5	—	—	2–1	0–4	3–0	—	3–0	1–1	—	—
Drogheda United	1–4	—	0–1	—	—	—	—	—	—	0–1	0–2	0–0
Dundalk	0–1	1–0	—	—	3–0	—	—	—	3–0	6–0	0–1	—
Finn Harps	—	—	0–1	—	2–3	0–2	—	1–3	—	—	—	1–2
Galway United	—	—	—	2–1	4–1	3–4	—	—	—	1–1	1–2	3–1
Limerick	1–0	—	2–1	—	1–0	—	0–2	2–2	—	—	—	0–0
St Patrick's Athletic	—	3–1	4–2	—	—	—	4–0	—	2–2	—	2–0	—
Shamrock Rovers	1–2	—	3–1	0–2	—	—	4–1	—	2–1	—	—	1–1
Sligo Rovers	1–0	0–0	—	3–0	—	1–1	—	—	—	1–1	—	—

Source: SSE Airtricity League, Soccerway
Legend: Blue = home team win; Yellow = draw; Red = away team win.
For upcoming matches, an "a" indicates there is an article about the rivalry between the two participants.

== Top scorers ==
Rank	Player	Club	Goals
1	(Republic of Ireland) Sean Maguire	Cork City	20
2	(Republic of Ireland) David McMillan	Dundalk	16
3	(Republic of Ireland) Dinny Corcoran	Bohemians	15
3	(Republic of Ireland) Gary McCabe	Bray Wanderers	15
5	(Brazil) Rodrigo Tosi	Limerick City	14
6	(Republic of Ireland) Ronan Murray	Galway United	13
7	(Republic of Ireland) Aaron Greene	Bray Wanderers	12
8	(Republic of Ireland) Gary Shaw	Shamrock Rovers	11
9	(Republic of Ireland) Patrick McEleney	Dundalk	10
9	(Republic of Ireland) Barry McNamee	Derry City	10
9	(Republic of Ireland) Kurtis Byrne	Bohemians	10

== Awards ==
=== Annual awards ===
Award	Winner	Club
PFAI Players' Player of the Year	(Republic of Ireland) Sean Maguire	Cork City
PFAI Young Player of the Year	(Republic of Ireland) Trevor Clarke	Shamrock Rovers
PFAI Manager of the Year	(Republic of Ireland) John Caulfield	Cork City

PFAI Team of the Year
Goalkeeper	(Republic of Ireland) Ger Doherty (Derry City)			
Defence	(Republic of Ireland) Sean Gannon (Dundalk)	(Finland) Niclas Vemmelund (Dundalk)	(Republic of Ireland) Ryan Delaney (Cork City)	(Republic of Ireland) Trevor Clarke (Shamrock Rovers)
Midfield	(Republic of Ireland) Aaron McEneff (Derry City)		(Republic of Ireland) Patrick McEleney (Dundalk)	(Republic of Ireland) Gearóid Morrissey (Cork City)
Attack	(Republic of Ireland) David McMillan (Dundalk)		(Republic of Ireland) Ronan Murray (Galway United)	(Republic of Ireland) Sean Maguire (Cork City)

== Attendances ==
No.	Club	Average
1	Cork City	4,562
2	Shamrock Rovers	2,815
3	Dundalk	2,707
4	Bohemian	1,962
5	Sligo Rovers	1,717
6	Limerick	1,607
7	St. Patrick's Athletic	1,531
8	Derry City	1,393
9	Galway United	1,366
10	Finn Harps	1,312
11	Bray Wanderers	966
12	Drogheda United	813

== See also ==
- 2017 League of Ireland First Division
- 2017 FAI Cup
- 2017 League of Ireland Cup
- 2017 St Patrick's Athletic F.C. season
