= 1979–80 League of Ireland =

League of Ireland
- Season: 1979–80
- Champions: Limerick United (1st title)
- Top goalscorer: Alan Campbell; Shamrock Rovers; 22 goals

The 1979–80 League of Ireland was contested by 16 teams, and Limerick United won the championship.

== Final classification ==
Pos	Team	Pld	W	D	L	GF	GA	GD	Pts	Qualification or relegation
1	Limerick United (C)	30	20	7	3	67	24	+43	47	Qualification to European Cup first round
2	Dundalk F.C.	30	20	6	4	59	13	+46	46	Qualification to UEFA Cup first round
3	Athlone Town A.F.C.	30	16	7	7	60	24	+36	39	
4	Shamrock Rovers F.C.	30	14	10	6	61	29	+32	38	
5	Finn Harps F.C.	30	16	6	8	49	33	+16	38	
6	Bohemian F.C.	30	12	8	10	42	30	+12	32	
7	Waterford	30	8	15	7	38	33	+5	31	Qualification to Cup Winners' Cup first round
8	Sligo Rovers F.C.	30	11	9	10	40	45	−5	31	
9	Thurles Town F.C.	30	9	10	11	43	48	−5	28	
10	Drogheda United F.C.	30	6	16	8	36	41	−5	28	
11	Galway Rovers	30	11	6	13	32	47	−15	28	
12	St Patrick's Athletic F.C.	30	9	9	12	39	46	−7	27	
13	Home Farm F.C.	30	10	5	15	27	42	−15	25	
14	Cork United	30	6	4	20	22	56	−34	16	
15	University College Dublin A.F.C.	30	5	4	21	24	75	−51	14	
16	Shelbourne F.C.	30	3	6	21	30	83	−53	12	

Source: www.rsssf.com
(C) Champions

== Results ==
Home \ Away	ATH	BOH	CUF	DRO	DUN	FHA	GAL	HOM	LIM	SHM	SHE	SLI	StP	THU	UCD	WAT
Athlone Town	—	2–1	2–1	4–0	0–1	0–1	6–0	2–0	1–1	4–1	3–0	0–2	1–0	3–0	6–0	0–0
Bohemians	3–3	—	1–0	1–1	1–0	4–0	0–0	1–2	1–0	0–2	4–1	0–0	0–0	1–0	3–0	0–2
Cork United	2–1	0–3	—	1–2	0–4	1–3	2–0	0–1	1–1	1–1	4–3	0–1	2–1	1–3	1–2	0–0
Drogheda United	1–2	3–1	2–0	—	0–2	2–3	0–0	1–2	1–4	1–1	2–2	1–1	0–3	1–1	1–2	1–1
Dundalk	1–0	1–0	3–0	1–1	—	0–1	7–2	0–0	1–0	1–0	9–0	3–2	3–0	2–0	6–0	0–0
Finn Harps	1–2	0–2	2–0	0–1	0–0	—	2–0	4–3	2–3	0–0	6–0	2–1	1–1	2–0	2–1	3–1
Galway Rovers	1–0	1–1	1–0	1–1	0–2	1–3	—	0–1	0–2	1–2	3–5	2–0	2–0	0–1	1–0	2–2
Home Farm	0–3	1–1	0–1	2–2	1–1	0–0	1–2	—	0–1	2–0	1–0	0–1	2–0	1–0	0–1	1–5
Limerick United	0–0	1–0	4–1	1–1	2–0	1–0	1–0	4–0	—	2–1	4–0	3–1	0–0	5–0	2–0	1–1
Shamrock Rovers	0–1	1–1	6–0	1–1	1–1	2–0	2–0	3–0	1–2	—	5–0	4–0	3–1	1–1	7–1	2–1
Shelbourne	1–4	0–1	1–0	1–4	0–3	1–2	2–4	0–2	1–4	0–0	—	1–1	1–2	1–1	4–1	1–1
Sligo Rovers	3–3	2–1	3–1	1–1	0–1	1–0	2–2	1–0	2–3	1–6	1–0	—	1–2	2–2	0–0	1–0
St Patrick's Athletic	1–1	1–4	1–0	0–2	0–1	1–4	0–1	3–1	2–1	3–3	2–0	4–5	—	4–1	1–1	1–1
Thurles Town	0–0	3–1	3–0	0–0	0–2	1–1	1–2	3–1	3–3	1–2	3–2	2–2	2–3	—	3–1	4–2
UCD	0–5	1–4	1–2	1–1	0–3	2–3	1–2	0–2	0–7	1–2	5–1	1–0	1–1	0–2	—	0–1
Waterford	2–1	2–1	0–0	1–1	2–0	1–1	0–1	2–0	3–4	1–1	1–1	0–2	1–1	2–2	2–0	—

Legend: Blue = home team win; Yellow = draw; Red = away team win.

== Top scorers ==
Rank	Player	Club	Goals
1	Alan Campbell	Shamrock Rovers	22
2	Tony Morris	Limerick United	19
3	Neville Steedman	Thurles Town	17
4	Gary Hulmes	Sligo Rovers (9); Limerick United (4)	13
5	Leo Flanagan	Dundalk	12
6	Brendan Bradley	Sligo Rovers	11
6	Eoin Hand	Limerick United	11
8	Eugene Davis	Athlone Town	10
8	Paddy Joyce	Bohemians	10
8	Joe Logan	Finn Harps	10
8	Joe McGrory	Finn Harps	10
8	John Minnock	Finn Harps	10
8	Ray Treacy	Shamrock Rovers	10
