= 1944–45 Dublin and Belfast Inter-City Cup =

Tournament details
- Country: Northern Ireland; Republic of Ireland
- Teams: 12

Final positions
- Champions: Bohemians (1st title)
- Runners-up: Belfast Celtic

Tournament statistics
- Matches played: 26
- Goals scored: 110 (4.23 per match)

The 1944–45 Dublin and Belfast Inter-City Cup was the 4th edition of the Dublin and Belfast Inter-City Cup, an association football cup competition featuring teams from Northern Ireland and the Republic of Ireland.

Teams from outside Dublin and Belfast competed, but played their home matches in either Dublin (if based in the Republic of Ireland) or Belfast (if based in Northern Ireland).

Bohemians won the title for the 1st time, defeating Belfast Celtic 3–2 on aggregate in the two-legged final.

== Results ==
=== First round ===
Teams that were at home in the first leg listed on the left.

Team 1	Agg.	Team 2	1st leg	2nd leg
Cliftonville	3–4	Bohemians	2–3	1–1
Derry City	4–6	Shelbourne	1–3	3–3
Distillery	6–4	Dundalk	5–2	1–2
Glentoran^{1}	3–3^{2}	Limerick	2–1	1–2
Linfield	9–7	Cork United^{1}	8–2	1–5
Shamrock Rovers	0–8	Belfast Celtic	0–3	0–5

^{1}Despite losing their ties, Glentoran and Cork United progressed to the quarter-finals as "best losers".
^{2}Limerick won the tie on corner kicks.

=== Quarter-finals ===
Teams that were at home in the first leg listed on the left.

Team 1	Agg.	Team 2	1st leg	2nd leg
Distillery	6–1	Limerick	5–0	1–1
Glentoran	3–3^{1}	Bohemians	1–0	2–3
Linfield	5–1	Cork United	3–0	2–1
Shelbourne	2–4	Belfast Celtic	0–0	2–4

^{1}Glentoran won the tie on corner kicks.

=== Semi-finals ===
Teams that were at home in the first leg listed on the left.

Team 1	Agg.	Team 2	1st leg	2nd leg
Bohemians	8–3	Distillery	5–1	3–2
Linfield	5–7	Belfast Celtic	2–2	3–5

=== Final ===
30 May 1945

Belfast Celtic	2–2	Bohemians
Bonnar 80', 83'	Report	Cullen 50' (o.g.); Smith 57'

Windsor Park, Belfast
Attendance: 12,000

2 June 1945

Bohemians	1–0	Belfast Celtic
M. O'Flanagan 67'	Report

Dalymount Park, Dublin
Referee: Mr P. Morris (Belfast)

Bohemians win 3–2 on aggregate.
