= 1947–48 Dublin and Belfast Inter-City Cup =

Tournament details
- Country: Northern Ireland; Republic of Ireland
- Teams: 12

Final positions
- Champions: Belfast Celtic (1st title); Distillery (1st title)

Tournament statistics
- Matches played: 27
- Goals scored: 79 (2.93 per match)

The 1947–48 Dublin and Belfast Inter-City Cup was the 7th edition of the Dublin and Belfast Inter-City Cup, an association football cup competition featuring teams from Northern Ireland and the Republic of Ireland.

Teams from outside Dublin and Belfast competed, but played their home matches in either Dublin (if based in the Republic of Ireland) or Belfast (if based in Northern Ireland).

Belfast Celtic and Distillery ended up sharing the title. Celtic won the first leg 2–1, and a date could not be found for the second leg, so both teams decided to share the trophy.

== Results ==
=== First round ===
Teams that were at home in the first leg listed on the left.

Team 1	Agg.	Team 2	1st leg	2nd leg
Ballymena United	4–2	Shelbourne^{1}	4–1	0–1
Belfast Celtic	7–2	Drumcondra	5–0	2–2
Cliftonville	2–4	Bohemians	1–1	1–3
Derry City	2–3	Limerick	1–0	1–3
Dundalk	1–4	Glentoran	0–0	1–4
Shamrock Rovers	3–3^{2}	Distillery	2–2	1–1

^{1}Despite losing their ties, Shelbourne progressed to the quarter-finals as "best losers".
^{2}Darkness prevented Shamrock Rovers and Distillery from playing extra time in their second leg, so it was decided that both teams would advance to the quarter-finals.

=== Quarter-finals ===
Teams that were at home in the first leg listed on the left.

Team 1	Agg.	Team 2	1st leg	2nd leg
Belfast Celtic	8–0	Limerick	5–0	3–0
Bohemians	2–3	Distillery	1–1	1–2
Glentoran	1–1	Shelbourne	1–0	0–1
Shamrock Rovers	8–3	Ballymena United	4–1	4–2

==== Playoff ====
Team 1	Score	Team 2
Glentoran	2–0	Shelbourne

=== Semi-finals ===
Teams that were at home in the first leg listed on the left.

Team 1	Agg.	Team 2	1st leg	2nd leg
Distillery	4–1	Glentoran	3–1	1–0
Shamrock Rovers	2–4	Belfast Celtic	1–2	1–2

=== Final ===
17 May 1948

Belfast Celtic	2–1	Distillery
Bonnar 18', 19'	Report	Lonsdale 53'

Solitude, Belfast

20 May 1948

Distillery	not played	Belfast Celtic
	Report

Dalymount Park, Dublin

Belfast Celtic and Distillery shared the trophy.
