= 1942–43 Dublin and Belfast Inter-City Cup =

Tournament details
- Country: Northern Ireland; Republic of Ireland
- Teams: 12

Final positions
- Champions: Shamrock Rovers (1st title)
- Runners-up: Bohemians

Tournament statistics
- Matches played: 26
- Goals scored: 95 (3.65 per match)

The 1942–43 Dublin and Belfast Inter-City Cup was the 2nd edition of the Dublin and Belfast Inter-City Cup, an association football cup competition featuring teams from Northern Ireland and the Republic of Ireland.

Teams from outside Dublin and Belfast competed, but played their home matches in either Dublin (if based in the Republic of Ireland) or Belfast (if based in Northern Ireland).

Shamrock Rovers won the title for the 1st time, defeating Bohemians 19–9 on corner kicks, after the two-legged final between the teams ended in a 2-2 aggregate draw.

== Results ==
=== First round ===
Teams that were at home in the first leg listed on the left.

Team 1	Agg.	Team 2	1st leg	2nd leg
Belfast Celtic	5–2	Cork United	5–1	0–1
Bohemians^{1}	1–1^{2}	Distillery	1–0	0–1
Cliftonville^{1}	3–4	Dundalk	2–1	1–3
Shamrock Rovers	7–4	Linfield	3–2	4–2
Shelbourne	3–0	Glentoran	1–0	2–0
St James's Gate	3–5	Derry City	3–1	0–4

^{1}Despite losing their ties, Bohemians and Cliftonville progressed to the quarter-finals as "best losers".
^{2}Distillery progressed by virtue of winning more corner kicks.

=== Quarter-finals ===
Teams that were at home in the first leg listed on the left.

Team 1	Agg.	Team 2	1st leg	2nd leg
Bohemians	7–3	Derry City	4–2	3–1
Cliftonville	2–4	Shamrock Rovers	1–1	1–3
Distillery	10–5	Dundalk	5–2	5–3
Shelbourne	2–7	Belfast Celtic	1–4	1–3

=== Semi-finals ===
Teams that were at home in the first leg listed on the left.

Team 1	Agg.	Team 2	1st leg	2nd leg
Bohemians	3–2	Belfast Celtic	2–2	1–0
Distillery	2–6	Shamrock Rovers	0–2	2–4

=== Final ===
29 May 1943

Shamrock Rovers	0–2	Bohemians
	Report	O'Flanagan 42', 52'

Windsor Park, Belfast

30 May 1943

Bohemians	0–2	Shamrock Rovers
	Report	Molloy 8' (o.g.); Coad 55'

Dalymount Park, Dublin

Shamrock Rovers win 19–9 on corner kicks after final finished 2–2 on aggregate.
