= Sean Sheehy =

Irish footballer and manager (1951–2025)

Personal information
- Date of birth: 29 November 1951
- Place of birth: Dublin, Ireland
- Date of death: 28 July 2025 (aged 73)
- Position: Winger

Senior career*
Years	Team	Apps	(Gls)
1970–1972	Dundalk	50	(7)
1972–1973	Preston North End	0	(0)
1973	→ Huddersfield Town (loan)	0	(0)
1973–1974	Norwich City	0	(0)
1974	Dundee United	3	(0)
1974	Dalkey United		
1974–1975	Bohemians	15	(5)
1975–1977	Dundalk	43	(8)
1977–1978	Thurles Town	27	(5)
1978–1979	Shelbourne	26	(6)
1979	Finn Harps	2	(0)
1979	Dunleary Celtic	1	(1)
1979–1981	Thurles Town	38	(8)

Managerial career
- 1977–1978: Thurles Town F.C.
- * Club domestic league appearances and goals

Sean Sheehy (29 November 1951 – 28 July 2025) was an Irish soccer player who played during the 1970s.

Sheehy played for Dundalk before transferring to Preston North End in August 1972.

In October 1974 he signed for Bohemians and scored the goal that won the 1974–75 League title for Bohemians.

He signed for League newcomers Thurles Town in September 1977.

He replaced Jimmy McGeough as Thurles Town manager in January 1978, but resigned in March.

Sheehy was capped by the Republic of Ireland twice at U23 level, four times at youth level and three times as an amateur.

Sheehy died on 28 July 2025, at the age of 73.

== Honours ==
Bohemians

- League of Ireland: 1974–75
- League of Ireland Cup: 1975

Dundalk

- League of Ireland: 1975–76
