= Peter Molloy =

Peter Molloy may refer to:

- Peter Molloy (footballer, born 1909) (1909–1993), English football player & manager, also known as Pat Molloy
- Peter Molloy (footballer, born 1921) (1921–1973), Irish footballer
- Paddy Molloy (hurler) (1934–2020), Irish hurler
- Peter Molloy (tennis), born (1923) Australian tennis player also known as Pat Malloy
