= 1943–44 Dublin and Belfast Inter-City Cup =

Tournament details
- Country: Northern Ireland; Republic of Ireland
- Teams: 12

Final positions
- Champions: Glentoran (1st title)
- Runners-up: Belfast Celtic

Tournament statistics
- Matches played: 26
- Goals scored: 87 (3.35 per match)

The 1943–44 Dublin and Belfast Inter-City Cup was the 3rd edition of the Dublin and Belfast Inter-City Cup, an association football cup competition featuring teams from Northern Ireland and the Republic of Ireland.

Teams from outside Dublin and Belfast competed, but played their home matches in either Dublin (if based in the Republic of Ireland) or Belfast (if based in Northern Ireland).

Glentoran won the title for the 1st time, defeating Belfast Celtic 5–4 on aggregate in the two-legged final.

== Results ==
=== First round ===
Teams that were at home in the first leg listed on the left.

Team 1	Agg.	Team 2	1st leg	2nd leg
Distillery	1–0	Cork United	1–0	0–0
Dundalk^{1}	1–2	Derry City	1–0	0–2
Linfield	3–5	Bohemians	0–4	3–1
Shamrock Rovers	4–5	Belfast Celtic	1–1	3–4
Shelbourne	4–1	Cliftonville	3–0	1–1
St James's Gate	2–7	Glentoran	1–2	1–5

^{1}Despite losing their ties, Dundalk and Shamrock Rovers progressed to the quarter-finals as "best losers".

=== Quarter-finals ===
Teams that were at home in the first leg listed on the left.

Team 1	Agg.	Team 2	1st leg	2nd leg
Derry City	2–5	Bohemians	0–2	2–3
Distillery	5–2	Dundalk	4–1	1–1
Glentoran	2–2^{1}	Shelbourne	2–2	0–0
Shamrock Rovers	4–8	Belfast Celtic	1–4	3–4

^{1}Glentoran won the tie on corner kicks.

=== Semi-finals ===
Teams that were at home in the first leg listed on the left.

Team 1	Agg.	Team 2	1st leg	2nd leg
Bohemians	1–2	Belfast Celtic	0–1	1–1
Distillery	3–7	Glentoran	2–1	1–6

=== Final ===
27 May 1944

Glentoran	3–3	Belfast Celtic
Neary 17', 54' (pen.); Deakin 85'	Report	McAlinden 18'; O'Neill 43', 63'

Windsor Park, Belfast
Attendance: 18,000
Referee: Mr W. Behan (Dublin)

29 May 1944

Belfast Celtic	1–2	Glentoran
O'Neill 89'	Report	McIlroy 19'; Bradford 79'

Dalymount Park, Dublin

Glentoran win 5–4 on aggregate.
