= 2025 Shamrock Rovers F.C. season =

Shamrock Rovers
2025 season
- Chairman: (Republic of Ireland) Ciaran Medlar
- Manager: (Republic of Ireland) Stephen Bradley
- Stadium: Tallaght Stadium
- Premier Division: 1st
- FAI Cup: Winners
- UEFA Conference League: League Phase
Home colours	Away colours

The 2025 Shamrock Rovers F.C. season was the clubs 126th season in existence. During the season the club won the League of Ireland Premier Division, regaining the title after it was won by Shelbourne in 2024.

The club would also win the 2025 FAI Cup defeating Cork City in the final. With this win, Rovers had won the double for the first time since 1987.

The club would also compete in the 2025–26 UEFA Conference League, going through the qualifying rounds and qualifying for the league phase, where they would finish 31st.

== Players ==
=== First-team squad ===
As of 25 February 2026

Note: Flags indicate national team as defined under FIFA eligibility rules; some limited exceptions apply. Players may hold more than one non-FIFA nationality.

No.	Pos.	Nation	Player
1	GK	IRL	Edward McGinty
2	DF	IRL	Enda Stevens
3	DF	WAL	Adam Matthews
4	DF	CPV	Roberto Lopes
5	DF	IRL	Lee Grace
6	DF	IRL	Daniel Cleary
7	MF	IRL	Dylan Watts
9	FW	IRL	Aaron Greene
10	FW	IRL	Graham Burke
11	FW	IRL	Jake Mulraney
14	MF	IRL	Danny Mandroiu
15	MF	IRL	Darragh Nugent
16	MF	IRL	Gary O'Neill
17	MF	IRL	Matt Healy
18	DF	IRL	Trevor Clarke
19	MF	IRL	Adam Brennan
20	FW	IRL	Rory Gaffney

No.	Pos.	Nation	Player
21	MF	IRL	Danny Grant
22	DF	IRL	Tunmise Sobowale (on loan from St Mirren)
23	MF	ENG	Connor Malley
24	DF	IRL	Egor Vassenin
25	GK	IRL	Lee Steacy
26	MF	IRL	John O'Sullivan
27	DF	IRL	Cory O'Sullivan
28	MF	IRL	Naj Razi
29	MF	IRL	Jack Byrne
30	GK	IRL	Todd Bazunu
31	FW	IRL	Michael Noonan
36	MF	IRL	Victor Ozhianvuna
38	MF	IRL	Max Kovalevskis
41	GK	IRL	Alex Noonan
88	FW	NIR	John McGovern
—	MF	ENG	Maleace Asamoah (on loan from Wigan Athletic)

=== Out on loan ===
Note: Flags indicate national team as defined under FIFA eligibility rules; some limited exceptions apply. Players may hold more than one non-FIFA nationality.

No.	Pos.	Nation	Player
22	MF	IRL	Cian Barrett (on loan at Waterford until 30 November 2026)
37	FW	IRL	Matthew Britton (on loan at Kerry until 30 November 2026)
—	MF	IRL	Eric Koufie (on loan at Kerry until 30 November 2026)
—	DF	IRL	Luke O'Regan (on loan at UCD until 30 June 2026)

=== Retired numbers ===
12 – 12th man

== Competitions ==
=== Club Friendlies ===
1 February 2025	(Republic of Ireland) Shamrock Rovers	3-0	(Republic of Ireland) Kerry	Dublin
16:00		Report		Stadium: Tallaght Stadium

=== League of Ireland ===
Pos	Team	Pld	W	D	L	GF	GA	GD	Pts	Qualification or relegation
1	Shamrock Rovers (C)	36	19	9	8	56	33	+23	66	Qualification for Champions League first qualifying round
2	Derry City	36	18	9	9	52	39	+13	63	Qualification for Europa League first qualifying round (Note: Shamrock Rovers won the 2025 FAI Cup, meaning the Europa League berth went to the second place team Derry City. The two Conference League berths went to the third and fourth place teams, Shelbourne and Bohemians respectively.)
3	Shelbourne	36	15	14	7	48	37	+11	59	Qualification for Conference League second qualifying round
4	Bohemians	36	16	6	14	48	39	+9	54	Qualification for Conference League first qualifying round
5	St Patrick's Athletic	36	13	13	10	42	32	+10	52	

Source: SSE Airtricity League, Soccerway
Rules for classification: 1) Points; 2) Goal difference; 3) Goals scored.
(C) Champions

==== Results summary ====
Overall								Home						Away					
Pld	W	D	L	GF	GA	GD	Pts	W	D	L	GF	GA	GD	W	D	L	GF	GA	GD
36	19	9	8	56	33	+23	66	12	3	3	33	12	+21	7	6	5	23	21	+2

Last updated: 1 November 2025.
Source: worldfootball

==== Results by round ====
Round	1	2	3	4	5	6	7	8	9	10
Ground	A	H	A	A	H	A	H	A	H	A
Result	L	W	D	L	W	W	D	W	W	D
Position	9	4	5	6	4	3	5	3	3	3

Updated to match(es) played on 18 April 2025. Source: 2025 League of Ireland Premier Division
A = Away; H = Home; W = Win; D = Draw; L = Loss

16 February 2025 1	Bohemian	1-0	Shamrock Rovers	Dublin
15:00	Tierney 25' (yellow card) 61'; Smith (yellow card) 30'; Devoy (yellow card) 56'; Cornwall (yellow card) 82'	Report	Cleary (yellow card) 4'; Mandroiu (yellow card) 15'	Stadium: Aviva Stadium; Attendance: 33,208; Referee: (Republic of Ireland) Robert Hennessy

28 February 2025 3	Shelbourne	1-1	Shamrock Rovers	Dublin
20:45	Wood 3'; Boyd (yellow card) 13'; Coyle (yellow card) 28'; Norris (yellow card) 90+1'	Report	McEneff 16'; Grant (yellow card) 39'; O'Neill (yellow card) 84'	Stadium: Tolka Park; Attendance: 5,214; Referee: (Republic of Ireland) Neil Doyle

3 March 2025 4	Sligo Rovers	2-1	Shamrock Rovers	Sligo
20:45	Hutchinson 38' (yellow card) 60' (goal) 78'; Kavanagh (yellow card) 51'; Doyle-Hayes (yellow card) 65'; Elding (yellow card) 87'; Hakiki (yellow card) 88'	Report	Lopes (yellow card) 29'; Honohan (yellow card) 37'; Burke 68'; McEneff (yellow card) 90'	Stadium: The Showgrounds; Attendance: 4,023; Referee: (Republic of Ireland) Robert Harvey

7 March 2025 5	Shamrock Rovers	1-0	St Patrick's Athletic	Dublin
20:45	O'Sullivan (yellow card) 34'; Grant 64'; O'Neill (yellow card) 87'; Honohan (yellow card) 88'	Report	Mulraney (yellow card) 21'; Sjöberg (yellow card) 45'	Stadium: Tallaght Stadium; Attendance: 8,093; Referee: (Republic of Ireland) Robert Hennessy

14 March 2025 6	Drogheda United	1-2	Shamrock Rovers	Drogheda
19:45	Keeley 33'; Davis (yellow card) 89'	Report	Greene 41'; Cleary (yellow card) 44'; Honohan (yellow card) 56'; Burke 70'; Healy (yellow card) 82'; Robertson (yellow card) 88'; Gaffney (yellow card) 90+5'	Stadium: Weavers Park; Attendance: 2,475; Referee: (Republic of Ireland) David Dunne

28 March 2025 7	Shamrock Rovers	0-0	Derry City	Dublin
20:00	McGinty (red card) 23'; Byrne (yellow card) 64'	Report	Mullen (yellow card) 18' (yellow-red card) 41'; Connolly (yellow card) 31'; Winchester (yellow card) 69'	Stadium: Tallaght Stadium; Attendance: 6,073; Referee: (Republic of Ireland) Paul McLaughlin

4 April 2025 8	Galway United	0-1	Shamrock Rovers	Galway
19:45	Dyer (yellow card) 64'	Report	Grant (yellow card) 42'; Gaffney 48'	Stadium: Eamonn Deacy Park; Attendance: 4,323; Referee: (Republic of Ireland) Kevin O'Sullivan

11 April 2025 9	Shamrock Rovers	2-0	Waterford	Dublin
20:00	McEneff 33' (yellow card) 90+3'; Cleary (yellow card) 70'; Healy (yellow card) 72'; Grace 84'	Report	Glenfield (yellow card) 17'; McDonald (yellow card) 49'; Radkowski (yellow card) 53'; Olayinka (yellow card) 81'; Coyle (yellow card) 90+4'	Stadium: Tallaght Stadium; Attendance: 4,846; Referee: (Republic of Ireland) Damien McGraith

14 April 2025 2	Shamrock Rovers	4-1	Cork City	Dublin
20:00	Greene 35' (yellow card) 40'; Honohan 45+1'; Lopes 48'; Byrne (yellow card) 58' (goal) 87'	Report	Shipston (yellow card) 43'; Darragh Crowley 90+2'	Stadium: Tallaght Stadium; Attendance: 4,101; Referee: (Republic of Ireland) Gavin Colfer

18 April 2025 10	St Patrick's Athletic	2-2	Shamrock Rovers	Dublin
19:45	Lennon (yellow card) 25'; Melia 32'; Redmond 90+2'	Report	Byrne 37'; Burke (yellow card) 67'; Grace (yellow card) 68' (goal) 88'; Cleary (yellow card) 90+1'	Stadium: Richmond Park; Attendance: 4,723; Referee: (Republic of Ireland) Neil Doyle

21 April 2025 11	Shamrock Rovers	2-3	Bohemian	Dublin
14:00	Byrne (yellow card) 27'; Honohan 39' (yellow card) 73'; Noonan 41'	Report	Tierney (yellow card) 25' (goal) 81'; Devoy (yellow card) 25' (goal) 70'; Kavanagh (yellow card) 78'; Buckley (yellow card) 78'; Brennan 90+6'	Stadium: Tallaght Stadium; Attendance: 8,471; Referee: (Republic of Ireland) Robert Harvey

25 April 2025 12	Shamrock Rovers	2-2	Shelbourne	Dublin
19:45	Healy 28'; Cleary 67'; Burke (yellow card) 87'; Byrne (yellow card) 90+6'	Report	Coote 50'; Chapman (yellow card) 53'; Odubeko 64'; Coyle (yellow card) 69'; Caffrey (yellow card) 84'; Gannon (yellow card) 90+5'	Stadium: Tallaght Stadium; Attendance: 7,317; Referee: (Republic of Ireland) Paul McLaughlin

2 May 2025 13	Cork City	1-1	Shamrock Rovers	Cork
19:45	Darragh Crowley (yellow card) 20'; Lyons (yellow card) 52'; Anderson 74'	Report	Gaffney 17'; Grant (yellow card) 73'; O'Sullivan (yellow card) 87'	Stadium: Turners Cross; Attendance: 3,619; Referee: (Republic of Ireland) Mark Houlihan

5 May 2025 14	Shamrock Rovers	2-0	Sligo Rovers	Dublin
19:00	Burke 26' (pen.); Healy (yellow card) 41'; Greene 42'; Grace (yellow card) 46'	Report	Mahon (yellow card) 18'	Stadium: Tallaght Stadium; Attendance: 4,577; Referee: (Republic of Ireland) Robert Hennessy

9 May 2025 15	Shamrock Rovers	3-0	Drogheda United	Dublin
19:45	Greene 50'; Grace 53'; Gaffney 90+3'	Report	Ahui (yellow card) 27'; Farrell (yellow card) 61'	Stadium: Tallaght Stadium; Attendance: 6,101; Referee: (Republic of Ireland) Robert Harvey

=== UEFA Conference League ===
==== League Phase ====
In this season Rovers became both, the first Irish team to qualify for the main stage of a European competition two years in a row, as well as the first Irish team to qualify for the main stage of a European competition after having not won the league the previous season.

Pos	Team	Pld	W	D	L	GF	GA	GD	Pts
29	(Slovak Football Association) Slovan Bratislava	6	2	0	4	5	9	−4	6
30	(Football Association of Iceland) Breiðablik	6	1	2	3	6	11	−5	5
31	(Football Association of Ireland) Shamrock Rovers	6	1	1	4	7	13	−6	4
32	(Swedish Football Association) BK Häcken	6	0	3	3	5	8	−3	3
33	(Malta Football Association) Hamrun Spartans	6	1	0	5	4	11	−7	3

Source: UEFA
Rules for classification: League phase tiebreakers
