= 1948–49 Dublin and Belfast Inter-City Cup =

Tournament details
- Country: Northern Ireland; Republic of Ireland
- Teams: 12

Final positions
- Champions: Shamrock Rovers (4th title)
- Runners-up: Dundalk

Tournament statistics
- Matches played: 12
- Goals scored: 37 (3.08 per match)

The 1948–49 Dublin and Belfast Inter-City Cup was the 8th and final edition of the Dublin and Belfast Inter-City Cup, an association football cup competition featuring teams from Northern Ireland and the Republic of Ireland.

Teams from outside Dublin and Belfast competed, but played their home matches in either Dublin (if based in the Republic of Ireland) or Belfast (if based in Northern Ireland). Each round was one-legged rather than the two-legged format of previous editions.

Shamrock Rovers won the title for the 4th time, defeating Dundalk 3–0 in the final.

== Results ==
=== First round ===
| Team 1 | Score | Team 2 |
|---|---|---|
| Derry City | 5–1 | Limerick |
| Drumcondra | 3–0 | Cliftonville |
| Glentoran | 1–1^{1} | Shamrock Rovers |
| Shelbourne | 1–2 | Distillery |
| Ballymena United | bye | |
| Belfast Celtic | bye^{2} | |
| Bohemians | bye | |
| Dundalk | bye | |

^{1}Glentoran and Shamrock Rovers both advanced into the quarter-finals due to Belfast Celtic's withdrawal.
^{2}Despite being given a bye into the quarter-finals, Belfast Celtic withdrew from the tournament.

=== Quarter-finals ===
| Team 1 | Score | Team 2 |
|---|---|---|
| Ballymena United | 0–4 | Drumcondra |
| Bohemians | 1–0 | Glentoran |
| Distillery | 1–3 | Dundalk |
| Shamrock Rovers | 2–0 | Derry City |

=== Semi-finals ===
| Team 1 | Score | Team 2 |
|---|---|---|
| Bohemians | 1–1 | Dundalk |
| Drumcondra | 1–2 | Shamrock Rovers |

==== Replay ====
| Team 1 | Score | Team 2 |
|---|---|---|
| Dundalk | 3–1 | Bohemians |

=== Final ===
18 May 1949

| Shamrock Rovers | 3–0 | Dundalk |
|---|---|---|
| Glennon 20'; Gaynor 79', 90' | Report |

Dalymount Park, Dublin
