= 1941–42 Dublin and Belfast Inter-City Cup =

Tournament details
- Country: Northern Ireland; Republic of Ireland
- Teams: 12

Final positions
- Champions: Dundalk (1st title)
- Runners-up: Shamrock Rovers

Tournament statistics
- Matches played: 25
- Goals scored: 105 (4.2 per match)

The 1941–42 Dublin and Belfast Inter-City Cup was the inaugural edition of the Dublin and Belfast Inter-City Cup, an association football cup competition featuring teams from Northern Ireland and the Republic of Ireland.

Teams from outside Dublin and Belfast competed, but played their home matches in either Dublin (if based in the Republic of Ireland) or Belfast (if based in Northern Ireland).

Dundalk won the title for the 1st time, defeating Shamrock Rovers 1–0 in the final at Dalymount Park.

== Results ==
=== First round ===
Teams that were at home in the first leg listed on the left.

Team 1	Agg.	Team 2	1st leg	2nd leg
Belfast Celtic	4–1	Shelbourne^{1}	2–0	2–1
Bohemians	5–3	Cliftonville^{1}	4–1	1–2
Derry City	3–10	Shamrock Rovers	2–5	1–5
Distillery	6–0	Cork United	3–0	3–0
Glentoran	3–6	Dundalk	1–5	2–1
St James's Gate	8–2	Linfield	6–1	2–1

^{1}Despite losing their ties, Cliftonville and Shelbourne progressed to the quarter-finals as "best losers".

=== Quarter-finals ===
Teams that were at home in the first leg listed on the left.

Team 1	Agg.	Team 2	1st leg	2nd leg
Bohemians	7–8	Belfast Celtic	5–2	2–6
Distillery	2–2^{1}	Dundalk	1–0	1–2
Shamrock Rovers	10–5	Shelbourne	6–3	4–2
St James's Gate	3–3^{2}	Cliftonville	3–0	0–3

^{1}Although the tie finished level on goals scored, the tie was awarded to Dundalk after Distillery left the pitch before extra time commenced in protest at the officials' decisions.
^{2}Cliftonville progressed by virtue of winning more corner kicks.

=== Semi-finals ===
Teams that were at home in the first leg listed on the left.

Team 1	Agg.	Team 2	1st leg	2nd leg
Belfast Celtic	2–3	Dundalk	2–2	0–1
Shamrock Rovers	7–1	Cliftonville	5–1	2–0

=== Final ===
31 May 1942

Dundalk	1–0	Shamrock Rovers
A. Kelly 73'	Report

Dalymount Park, Dublin
Attendance: 20,000
