= Aaron Greene =

Republic of Ireland footballer

Personal information
- Full name: Aaron Greene
- Date of birth: 2 January 1990 (age 36)
- Place of birth: Dublin, Republic of Ireland
- Height: 1.77 m (5 ft 10 in)
- Position: Forward

Team information
- Current team: Shamrock Rovers
- Number: 9

Senior career*
Years	Team	Apps	(Gls)
2009	Galway United	14	(5)
2010	Bohemians	18	(1)
2011	Sligo Rovers	35	(4)
2012	Shamrock Rovers	23	(2)
2013–2014	Sligo Rovers	41	(9)
2014–2015	St Patrick's Athletic	40	(11)
2016	Limerick	22	(11)
2017–2018	Bray Wanderers	44	(12)
2018–	Shamrock Rovers	228	(54)
- * Club domestic league appearances and goals as of 17:16, 9 November 2026 (UTC)

Aaron Greene (born 2 January 1990) is an Irish footballer who plays as a forward for Shamrock Rovers in the League of Ireland Premier Division. His former clubs include Galway United, Bohemians, Sligo Rovers, St Patrick's Athletic, Limerick, and Bray Wanderers.

== Career ==
=== Early career ===
Greene has played for Galway United, Bohemians, Sligo Rovers, Shamrock Rovers, St Patrick's Athletic, Limerick, and Bray Wanderers between 2009 and 2018.

=== Return to Shamrock Rovers ===
Greene returned to Shamrock Rovers in 2018. Greene scored 15 goals in all competitions during the 2019 season. After the 1–1 draw against Shelbourne on 11 August 2023, Greene was restrained by teammates after comments were directed at him by a supporter. Greene missed in a penalty shootout vs Molde FK in the 2025 UEFA Conference League round of 32.

== Personal life ==
Greene's son Jack is also a professional footballer, having come through the academy at Shamrock Rovers, with the pair playing together for the first time in January 2026 in a pre-season friendly against Longford Town.

== Career statistics ==
As of match played 23 October 2026

Appearances and goals by club, season and competition
Club	Season	League			National cup		League cup		Europe		Other		Total	
Club	Season	Division	Apps	Goals	Apps	Goals	Apps	Goals	Apps	Goals	Apps	Goals	Apps	Goals
Galway United	2009	LOI Premier Division	14	5	0	0	0	0	—		—		14	5
Bohemians	2010	LOI Premier Division	18	1	2	1	1	1	1 (Note: Appearances in UEFA Champions League)	0	4 (Note: Three appearances in the Setanta Sports Cup; one appearance in the Leinster Senior Cup)	0	26	3
Sligo Rovers	2011	LOI Premier Division	35	4	6	2	2	0	2 (Note: Appearances in UEFA Europa League)	0	4 (Note: Appearances in Setanta Sports Cup)	0	49	7
Shamrock Rovers	2012	LOI Premier Division	23	2	0	0	2	0	0	0	7 (Note: Three appearances in the Setanta Sports Cup; four appearances, three goals in the Leinster Senior Cup)	3	32	5
Sligo Rovers	2013	LOI Premier Division	24	7	4	0	2	0	0	0	3	0	33	7
Sligo Rovers	2014	LOI Premier Division	17	2	1	0	0	0	2	1	5 (Note: Four appearances, three goals in the Setanta Sports Cup; one appearances in the President of Ireland's Cup)	3	25	6
Sligo Rovers	Total		41	9	5	0	2	0	2	1	8	3	58	13
St Patrick's Athletic	2014	LOI Premier Division	9	2	—		—		—		1 (Note: Appearances in Leinster Senior Cup)	0	10	2
St Patrick's Athletic	2015	LOI Premier Division	31	9	2	0	2	0	2	1	1	0	38	10
St Patrick's Athletic	Total		40	11	2	0	2	0	2	1	2	0	48	12
Limerick	2016	LOI First Division	22	11	1	0	3	2	—		1 (Note: Appearances in Munster Senior Cup)	0	27	13
Bray Wanderers	2017	LOI Premier Division	33	12	1	0	1	0	—		1 (Note: Appearance in the Scottish Challenge Cup)	0	36	12
Bray Wanderers	2018	LOI Premier Division	11	0	—		0	0	—		1	0	12	0
Bray Wanderers	Total		44	12	1	0	1	0	—		2	0	48	12
Shamrock Rovers	2018	LOI Premier Division	8	0	1	0	—		2	0	—		11	0
Shamrock Rovers	2019	LOI Premier Division	34	11	5	3	1	0	3	1	0	0	43	15
Shamrock Rovers	2020	LOI Premier Division	18	7	3	1	—		2	0	—		23	8
Shamrock Rovers	2021	LOI Premier Division	33	6	2	0	—		6 (Note: Two appearances in the UEFA Champions League; four appearances in the UEFA Europa Conference League)	0	1 (Note: Appearance in the President of Ireland's Cup)	0	42	6
Shamrock Rovers	2022	LOI Premier Division	33	4	2	0	—		12 (Note: Three appearances, one goal in the UEFA Champions League; four appearances in the UEFA Europa League; five appearances in the UEFA Europa Conference League)	1	0	0	47	5
Shamrock Rovers	2023	LOI Premier Division	18	6	1	0	—		3 (Note: One appearance in the UEFA Champions League; two appearances in the UEFA Europa Conference League)	0	1	0	23	6
Shamrock Rovers	2024	LOI Premier Division	30	8	1	0	—		11 (Note: Four appearances, two goals in the UEFA Champions League; three appearances in the UEFA Europa League; four appearances in the UEFA Conference League)	2	1	0	43	10
Shamrock Rovers	2025	LOI Premier Division	24	6	2	0	—		4 (Note: Two appearances in the 2024–25 UEFA Conference League; two appearances in the 2025–26 UEFA Conference League)	0	0	0	30	6
Shamrock Rovers	2026	LOI Premier Division	30	6	2	0	—		6 (Note: Two appearances, one goal in the UEFA Champions League; two appearances in the UEFA Europa League; two appearances in the UEFA Conference League)	1	0	0	38	7
Shamrock Rovers	Total		228	54	19	4	1	0	47	5	3	0	300	63
Career total			465	109	36	7	14	3	54	7	31	6	602	132

== Honours ==
Bohemians

- Setanta Sports Cup (1): 2009–10

Sligo Rovers

- FAI Cup (2): 2011, 2013
- Setanta Sports Cup (1): 2014

Limerick

- League of Ireland First Division (1): 2016

Shamrock Rovers

- League of Ireland Premier Division (6): 2020, 2021, 2022, 2023, 2025, 2026
- FAI Cup (2): 2019, 2025
- President of Ireland's Cup (2): 2022, 2024
- Leinster Senior Cup (1): 2011–12

St Patrick's Athletic

- League of Ireland Cup (1): 2015
