= Cory O'Sullivan =

Irish footballer (born 2006)

Personal information
- Full name: Cory O'Sullivan
- Date of birth: 2 May 2006 (age 20)
- Place of birth: Ballyfermot, County Dublin, Republic of Ireland
- Height: 1.73 m (5 ft 8 in)
- Positions: Left back; centre back

Team information
- Current team: Shamrock Rovers
- Number: 27

Youth career
- –2016: Lucan United
- 2016–: Shamrock Rovers

Senior career*
Years	Team	Apps	(Gls)
2022–	Shamrock Rovers	53	(1)

International career^{‡}
2021–2022	Republic of Ireland U16	11	(0)
2022–2023	Republic of Ireland U17	14	(0)
2023–2025	Republic of Ireland U19	14	(0)
2025–	Republic of Ireland U21	3	(0)
- * Club domestic league appearances and goals as of 17:33, 9 November 2026 (UTC) ‡ National team caps and goals as of 22:16, 9 June 2026 (UTC)

Cory O'Sullivan (born 2 May 2006) is an Irish professional footballer who plays as a defender for League of Ireland Premier Division club Shamrock Rovers.

== Career ==
=== Youth career ===
Ballyfermot, County Dublin man O'Sullivan left Lucan United to join the academy of League of Ireland club Shamrock Rovers at the age of 10.

=== Shamrock Rovers ===
On 29 July 2022, O'Sullivan made his senior debut for Shamrock Rovers, playing the full 90 minutes in a 4–0 win over Bangor GG in the FAI Cup at Tallaght Stadium. He made his League of Ireland Premier Division debut for the club on 29 April 2024, replacing Dylan Watts in the 68th minute of a 4–0 win at home to Drogheda United. On 2 August 2024, he scored his first goal at senior level, opening the scoring in the 8th minute of a 2–1 win over Waterford at the RSC. O'Sullivan made his first appearance in European competition on 3 October 2024, replacing Markus Poom in the 54th minute of a 1–1 draw at home to APOEL in the league phase of the UEFA Conference League at Tallaght Stadium.

== International career ==
O'Sullivan has represented the Republic of Ireland at various underage levels. He was part of the squad for the Republic of Ireland U17 side's 2023 UEFA European Under-17 Championship campaign in May 2023. In November 2023, he received his first call up to the Republic of Ireland U19 side, who he went on to make 14 appearances for. On 21 May 2025, he received his first call up to the Republic of Ireland U21 side for their June friendly fixtures against Croatia U21 and Qatar U23 in Croatia. On 10 June 2025, he made his debut for the U21s in a 0–0 draw with Qatar U23.

== Career statistics ==
As of match played on 12 October 2026

Appearances and goals by club, season and competition
Club	Season	League			National Cup (Note: Includes FAI Cup)		Europe		Other		Total	
Club	Season	Division	Apps	Goals	Apps	Goals	Apps	Goals	Apps	Goals	Apps	Goals
Shamrock Rovers	2022	LOI Premier Division	0	0	1	0	0 (Note: Appearance(s) in the UEFA Champions League)	0	0 (Note: Appearance in the President of Ireland's Cup)	0	1	0
Shamrock Rovers	2023	LOI Premier Division	0	0	0	0	0	0	0 (Note: Appearance(s) in the Leinster Senior Cup)	0	0	0
Shamrock Rovers	2024	LOI Premier Division	6	1	0	0	3 (Note: 2 appearances in the UEFA Europa League; 1 appearance in the UEFA Conference League)	0	3	0	12	1
Shamrock Rovers	2025	LOI Premier Division	26	0	4	0	8 (Note: 1 appearance in the 2024–25 UEFA Conference League; 7 appearances in the 2025–26 UEFA Conference League)	0	0	0	38	0
Shamrock Rovers	2026	LOI Premier Division	21	0	1	0	3 (Note: Appearances in the UEFA Champions League)	0	1	0	26	0
Shamrock Rovers	Total		53	1	6	0	14	0	4	0	77	1
Total			53	1	6	0	14	0	4	0	77	1
