= 1945–46 Dublin and Belfast Inter-City Cup =

Tournament details
- Country: Northern Ireland; Republic of Ireland
- Teams: 12

Final positions
- Champions: Shamrock Rovers (2nd title)
- Runners-up: Belfast Celtic

Tournament statistics
- Matches played: 26
- Goals scored: 109 (4.19 per match)

The 1945–46 Dublin and Belfast Inter-City Cup was the 5th edition of the Dublin and Belfast Inter-City Cup, an association football cup competition featuring teams from Northern Ireland and the Republic of Ireland.

Teams from outside Dublin and Belfast competed, but played their home matches in either Dublin (if based in the Republic of Ireland) or Belfast (if based in Northern Ireland).

Shamrock Rovers won the title for the 2nd time, defeating Belfast Celtic 3–2 on aggregate in the two-legged final.

== Results ==
=== First round ===
Teams that were at home in the first leg listed on the left.

Team 1	Agg.	Team 2	1st leg	2nd leg
Bohemians^{1}	2–3	Glentoran	1–0	1–3
Cliftonville	1–7	Shelbourne	1–4	0–3
Distillery	7–1	Cork United	5–0	2–1
Dundalk	2–10	Belfast Celtic	0–5	2–5
Linfield	3–1	Drumcondra^{1}	2–1	1–0
Shamrock Rovers	6–2	Derry City	5–1	1–1

^{1}Despite losing their ties, Bohemians and Drumcondra progressed to the quarter-finals as "best losers".

=== Quarter-finals ===
Teams that were at home in the first leg listed on the left.

Team 1	Agg.	Team 2	1st leg	2nd leg
Bohemians	2–11	Linfield	1–7	1–4
Distillery	5–4	Drumcondra	4–3	1–1
Shamrock Rovers	7–4	Glentoran	3–1	4–3
Shelbourne	0–10	Belfast Celtic	0–2	0–8

=== Semi-finals ===
Teams that were at home in the first leg listed on the left.

Team 1	Agg.	Team 2	1st leg	2nd leg
Belfast Celtic	6–1	Linfield	5–1	1–0
Shamrock Rovers	6–3	Distillery	1–2	5–1

=== Final ===
1 June 1946

Belfast Celtic	1–3	Shamrock Rovers
Tully	Report	Gregg; Coad

Windsor Park, Belfast
Referee: Mr P. Finnegan (Dublin)

3 June 1946

Shamrock Rovers	0–1	Belfast Celtic
	Report	Tully 62'

Dalymount Park, Dublin

Shamrock Rovers win 3–2 on aggregate.
