= Egor Vassenin =

Irish footballer (born 2007)

Personal information
- Full name: Egor Vassenin
- Date of birth: 24 October 2007 (age 19)
- Place of birth: Kilcullen, County Kildare, Ireland
- Height: 1.91 m (6 ft 3 in)
- Position: Defender

Team information
- Current team: Shamrock Rovers

Youth career
- 2014–2021: Kilcullen AFC
- 2021–2025: Klub Kildare
- 2025–: Shamrock Rovers

Senior career*
Years	Team	Apps	(Gls)
2025–	Shamrock Rovers	1	(0)
2026	→ Dundalk (loan)	9	(0)

International career^{‡}
2022–2023	Republic of Ireland U16	3	(0)
2024	Republic of Ireland U17	2	(0)
2024	Republic of Ireland U18	1	(0)
- * Club domestic league appearances and goals as of 13:46, 9 November 2026 (UTC) ‡ National team caps and goals as of 17:00, 21 July 2026 (UTC)

Egor Vassenin (born 24 October 2007) is an Irish professional footballer who plays as a defender for League of Ireland Premier Division club Shamrock Rovers.

== Club career ==
=== Youth career ===
A native of Kilcullen, County Kildare, Vassenin began playing football with local club Kilcullen AFC up to Under-13 level, he then joined League of Ireland underage academy side Klub Kildare in June 2021 and remained there until July 2025 when he signed a professional contract with Shamrock Rovers, where he would initially play games in their academy.

=== Shamrock Rovers ===
On 5 July 2025, Vassenin signed for League of Ireland Premier Division club Shamrock Rovers on professional terms. On 1 November 2025, he made his senior debut for the club, playing the full 90 minutes in a 3–2 defeat to Sligo Rovers at Tallaght Stadium in the final league game of the season, before his side lifted the league trophy as 2025 League of Ireland Premier Division winners.

==== Dundalk loan ====
On 16 July 2026, Vassenin signed for fellow League of Ireland Premier Division club Dundalk on loan until the end of the season. The following day he made his debut for the club, in a 3–1 win over St Mochta's in the FAI Cup at Oriel Park.

== International career ==
On 30 October 2022, he made his debut in international football, for the Republic of Ireland U16's penalty shootout win over Wales U16 with Vassenin scoring in the 5–4 shootout victory after a 2–2 draw in his side's opening Victory Shield fixture. On 14 February 2024, he made his Republic of Ireland U17 debut in a 2–0 defeat to Hungary U17 in a friendly in Spain. In November 2024, he received his first call-up to the Republic of Ireland U18 side for their friendlies in Croatia against Japan U18, Croatia U18 and Portugal U18. He made his debut for the side in a 4–0 defeat to Portugal U19 on 19 November 2024.

== Career statistics ==
As of match played on 23 October 2026

Appearances and goals by club, season and competition
Club	Season	League			National Cup (Note: Includes FAI Cup)		Europe		Other		Total	
Club	Season	Division	Apps	Goals	Apps	Goals	Apps	Goals	Apps	Goals	Apps	Goals
Shamrock Rovers	2025	LOI Premier Division	1	0	0	0	0 (Note: Appearances in the UEFA Conference League)	0	–		1	0
Shamrock Rovers	2026	LOI Premier Division	0	0	–		0 (Note: Appearances in the UEFA Champions League)	0	0 (Note: Appearances in the Leinster Senior Cup)	0	0	0
Shamrock Rovers	Total		1	0	0	0	0	0	0	0	1	0
Dundalk (loan)	2026	LOI Premier Division	9	0	3	0	–		–		12	0
Career total			10	0	3	0	0	0	0	0	13	0

== Honours ==
Shamrock Rovers

- League of Ireland Premier Division: 2025
