= 1946–47 Dublin and Belfast Inter-City Cup =

Tournament details
- Country: Northern Ireland; Republic of Ireland
- Teams: 12

Final positions
- Champions: Shamrock Rovers (3rd title)
- Runners-up: Drumcondra

Tournament statistics
- Matches played: 26
- Goals scored: 100 (3.85 per match)

The 1946–47 Dublin and Belfast Inter-City Cup was the 6th edition of the Dublin and Belfast Inter-City Cup, an association football cup competition featuring teams from Northern Ireland and the Republic of Ireland.

Teams from outside Dublin and Belfast competed, but played their home matches in either Dublin (if based in the Republic of Ireland) or Belfast (if based in Northern Ireland).

Shamrock Rovers won the title for the 3rd time and 2nd consecutive year, defeating Drumcondra 4–1 on aggregate in the two-legged final.

== Results ==
=== First round ===
Teams that were at home in the first leg listed on the left.

Team 1	Agg.	Team 2	1st leg	2nd leg
Bohemians	2–8	Belfast Celtic	1–3	1–5
Cliftonville	4–6	Shamrock Rovers	3–3	1–3
Derry City	2–6	Drumcondra	1–4	1–2
Distillery^{1}	4–5	Cork United	2–2	2–3
Glentoran	5–2	Dundalk^{1}	3–0	2–2
Shelbourne	0–11	Linfield	0–1	0–10

^{1}Despite losing their ties, Distillery and Dundalk progressed to the quarter-finals as "best losers".

=== Quarter-finals ===
Teams that were at home in the first leg listed on the left.

Team 1	Agg.	Team 2	1st leg	2nd leg
Belfast Celtic	6–1	Cork United	4–0	2–1
Distillery	3–2	Dundalk	1–1	2–1
Linfield	2–6	Shelbourne	1–1	1–5
Shamrock Rovers	8–2	Glentoran	6–0	2–2

=== Semi-finals ===
Teams that were at home in the first leg listed on the left.

Team 1	Agg.	Team 2	1st leg	2nd leg
Distillery	2–5	Drumcondra	0–2	2–3
Shamrock Rovers	2–1	Belfast Celtic	1–1	1–0

=== Final ===
7 June 1947

Drumcondra	1–3	Shamrock Rovers
Daly 70'	Report	Coad 53'; Behan 60' ?

Dalymount Park, Dublin

11 June 1947

Shamrock Rovers	1–0	Drumcondra
Coad 5'	Report

Windsor Park, Belfast

Shamrock Rovers win 4–1 on aggregate.
