= Gino Brazil =

Irish former footballer

Personal information
- Date of birth: 28 March 1968 (age 58)
- Place of birth: Dublin, Ireland

Senior career*
Years	Team	Apps	(Gls)
- St Patrick's Athletic
1987–1989	Home Farm		
1989	Finn Harps	0	(0)
1989–2001	Shamrock Rovers	258	(1)
2000–2001	Athlone Town		
- * Club domestic league appearances and goals

Gino Brazil (born 28 March 1968) is an Irish former footballer. He is working as a Football in Community Development Officer for the Football Association of Ireland.

== Career ==
Brazil played all his schoolboy football with Belvedere and then got an offer to sign for St Patrick's Athletic where he spent five months. After a period on the bench he dropped down a division and signed for Home Farm for two seasons.

After a spell at Finn Harps (3 League Cup appearances) he signed for Shamrock Rovers under Noel King in 1989. He made his Rovers debut against Derry City on Friday 10 December 1989. He went to spend almost twelve seasons at Rovers where he made 323 competitive appearances scoring twice. In light of the club's failure to award Brazil a well-deserved testimonial Rovers fans organised a testimonial dinner on Sunday 26 October 1997.

He played every game in the 1993/94 title winning year scoring once against Bohs on 26 September 1993 at the RDS Arena. Brazil was Rovers Player of the Year the following season (Shamrock Rovers#Player of the Year).

He made 4 appearances for Rovers in European competition.

In January 2001 Brazil signed for Athlone Town.
