= Frank Glennon =

Irish footballer (1919–1992)

Frank Glennon (4 January 1919 – 1 April 1992) was an Irish soccer player who played in the League of Ireland during the 1940s.

== Career ==
Glennon played for Bohemians and Shamrock Rovers amongst others during his career in the League of Ireland. He joined the Milltown club for the 1945/46 season. Together with Brendan O'Kelly, he represented Ireland at the 1948 Olympic Games.
