= Neville Steedman =

Irish footballer

Neville Steedman (born 18 September 1957) was an Irish soccer player during the 1980s who played as a forward.

He represented Thurles Town, Shamrock Rovers and Galway United amongst others during his career. He made three appearances for Rovers in the European Cup and 75 in total.

Steedman had been playing reserve football for Bohs and Athlone after his stint at Thurles when he was contacted by Jim McLaughlin (football manager). He signed for the Glenmalure Park club in 1983 making his debut in a Dublin City Cup game on 2 September. On 22 August 1984, in a LFA President's Cup final, he took over from injured goalkeeper Jody Byrne as Rovers won the first trophy of the season.

Spent the 1985–86 season at Galway United before moving back to the Hoops.

Scored the last ever goal at Milltown in a reserve Cup game win on 19 May 1987.

An allrounder Steedman played rugby and cricket at a senior level and is now an accomplished golfer.

== Sources ==
- Paul Doolan; Robert Goggins. The Hoops. ISBN 0-7171-2121-6.
- Robert Goggins. The Four-in-a-Row Story.
