= Jimmy McGeough =

Northern Irish footballer and manager

Personal information
- Date of birth: 14 July 1943 (age 83)
- Place of birth: Belfast, Northern Ireland
- Position: Midfielder

Senior career*
Years	Team	Apps	(Gls)
1964–1965	Derry City	47	(16)
1965–1972	Waterford United	147	(11)
1972–1974	Lincoln City	65	(0)
1972–1973	→ Hartlepool United	1	(0)
1974–1977	Waterford United	63	(2)
1977–1978	Thurles Town	17	(0)
1978–1980	New York Apollo	23	(1)

International career
- League of Ireland XI

Managerial career
- 1977–1978: Thurles Town
- 1980–1981: New York Apollo
- SUNY Farmingdale
- 2002–2003: Waterford United
- 2004–2005: Larne
- * Club domestic league appearances and goals

Jimmy McGeough (born 13 August 1944) is a Northern Irish former football player and manager.

== Playing and coaching career ==
His clubs included Derry City, Lincoln and Waterford United.

Joining Derry in July 1963 he was part of the only Derry City side ever to win the Irish League (Northern Ireland) and was an Irish Cup winner too with the Candystripes. He scored in the European Cup. McGeough played his last game for Derry at Coleraine on 9 October 1965 bringing an end to a sequence of never having missed a single match for Derry since his arrival in July 1963.

Derry withdrew from the Irish League in 1973 due to civil unrest.

He signed for Waterford from Derry in December 1965 for £3,000 and was part of the great Waterford side of the 1960s and 1970s. He left for Lincoln City at the end of the 1971/72 season but moved back to the Blues in November 1974.

He was capped at Inter-League level by the Irish League and the League of Ireland.

Jimmy was appointed the first player-manager of Thurles Town in June 1977.

However, he departed for New York Apollo a year later. In 1980, the Apollo came under new ownership which renamed the team the New York United. In 1981, he was the American Soccer League Coach of the Year. McGeough also spent ten seasons as the head coach of the SUNY Farmingdale. The dates are unknown, but he compiled a 111–76–6 record. McGeough enjoyed success as a coach in the US, mainly with Long Island Rough Riders. He linked up with Alfonso Mondelo in 2000 to coach Tampa Bay Mutiny but soon after the Mutiny franchise was closed down by MLS.

After nearly a quarter of a century in the United States he was appointed manager of Waterford United in January 2002. taking over following Paul Power's resignation late in the 2001 season. He guided the club to a top half finish in the First Division in his first season.

The following year, McGeough's first full season in charge, Waterford won the First Division title. McGeough unearthed some talents with Republic of Ireland under-21 goalkeeper Dan Connor (footballer), Daryl Murphy and Neale Fenn.

However off the pitch, McGeough had a difficult relationship with club chairman Ger O'Brien. A dip in form with a series of poor results followed and their rift becoming public knowledge. The rift stemmed from McGeough's request to have Kevin O'Brien, the chairman's son, released. A restructuring of the coaching staff, reportedly supported by the manager, saw McGeough handing over some of his power to assistant Giles Cheevers. He was sacked in December 2003 leading to much outrage from Waterford's fans.

Jimmy McGeough took charge of Larne FC in August 2004, and in his first season led the Antrim club to the Irish Cup final at Windsor Park. The tiny club also survived in the Irish Premier League before McGeough returned to the U.S. to rejoin his family. It was reported at the time he returned home that it was due to 9/11-related terrorism laws that prevented McGeough from being out of the US for more than 12 consecutive months.

He is coaching children in Florida with his son Jim who had an extensive professional career. His other sons, Paul and Tony were also professionals in the New York soccer scene. He is married to Belfast-born Margaret Ward and also has a daughter, Annette.

== Honours ==
=== Player ===
- Irish Football League:
  - Derry City 1964–1965
- Irish Cup:
  - Derry City 1964
- League of Ireland: 5
  - Waterford United 1965–66, 1967–68, 1968–69, 1969–70, 1971–72
- Top Four Cup: 4
  - Waterford United 1967–68,1968–69,1969–70,1970–71
- League of Ireland Shield:
  - Waterford United 1968–1969
- Texaco Cup :
  - Waterford United 1974/75

=== Manager ===
- League of Ireland First Division:
  - Waterford United 2002–03
