= Thurles Town F.C. =

- Full name: Thurles Town Football Club
- Nickname: The Town
- Founded: 1950 merged 1977
- Ground: Thurles Greyhound Stadium
- League: League of Ireland; North Tipperary District League
- Website: thurlestownfc.ie
Home colours

Thurles Town Football Club is an Irish association football club based in Thurles, County Tipperary. Their senior team play in the North Tipperary District League. Thurles Town A.F.C. was formed in 1950. In 1977 they merged with Peake Villa to become Thurles Town F.C. and in order to enter a team in the League of Ireland. Thurles Town played in the League of Ireland from 1977–78 until 1981–82. Their best performance was a ninth-place finish in 1979–80. Throughout their time in the League of Ireland, Thurles Town also competed in the FAI Cup. However they never progressed beyond the first round they played in. When Thurles Town withdrew from the League of Ireland in 1982, Peake Villa returned to play in the Kilkenny League and the Tipperary Southern and District League.

== Notable former players ==
- Mick Cooke – League of Ireland manager
- Pat Dunne – member of Republic of Ireland national football team
- Terry Flanagan – League of Ireland XI representative
- Alfie Hale – member of Republic of Ireland national football team
- Jimmy McGeough – League of Ireland XI representative
- Neville Steedman – 1979–80 best goalscorer

== Former managers ==
- Jimmy McGeough: 1977–1978
- Sean Sheehy: 1978
- Pat Dunne: 1978–80?
- John Doran: 1980–81?
- Alfie Hale: 1981–1982
