= Peter Molloy (footballer, born 1921) =

Irish footballer and manager

Personal information
- Date of birth: 1921
- Place of birth: Athlone, Ireland
- Date of death: 1973 (aged 51–52)
- Place of death: Athlone, Ireland
- Position: Defender

Senior career*
Years	Team	Apps	(Gls)
- Bohemians
1947–1948	Notts County	1	(0)
- * Club domestic league appearances and goals

Peter Molloy (1921–1973) was an Irish professional footballer who played as a defender.

== Career ==
Molloy played for Bohemians in the League of Ireland, winning the Inter City Cup in 1945. He also played briefly for Notts County, making one appearance in the Football League during the 1947–48 season.

Molloy died in 1973 in Athlone, Ireland.
