= Dublin and Belfast Inter-City Cup =

- Organiser(s): Irish Football Association; Football Association of Ireland
- Founded: 1941
- Abolished: 1949
- Region: Northern Ireland; Republic of Ireland
- Teams: 12
- Most championships: Shamrock Rovers (4 titles)

The Dublin and Belfast Inter-City Cup was an association football competition that ran for eight seasons in Ireland between 1941 and 1949.

Each season's competition consisted of six teams from each of the two jurisdictions on the island of Ireland (Northern Ireland and the Republic of Ireland), and their respective governing bodies (the Irish Football Association and the Football Association of Ireland).

== Format ==
Played in knock out format, the matches were played on a two-legged basis. Dalymount Park, Dublin was used as the home venue by all the League of Ireland clubs. For the second round of the competition, the six first round winners were joined by the two best losers. It was an extremely popular competition, adding variety to the restricted war-time football diet and generated much needed and significant revenues to the competing clubs.

== List of finals ==
Key:

†	Trophy was shared.
	Two-legged final. Aggregate score across two legs determined the winner; if score was level number of corner kicks determined the winner.

Season	Winner (number of titles)	Score	Runner-up	Venue
1941–42	(Republic of Ireland) Dundalk (1)	1 – 0	(Republic of Ireland) Shamrock Rovers	Dalymount Park, Dublin
1942–43	(Republic of Ireland) Shamrock Rovers (1)	0 – 2	(Republic of Ireland) Bohemians	Windsor Park, Belfast
1942–43	(Republic of Ireland) Shamrock Rovers (1)	2 – 0 (2 – 2 agg.) (19 – 9 corner kicks)	(Republic of Ireland) Bohemians	Dalymount Park, Dublin
1943–44	(Northern Ireland) Glentoran (1)	3 – 3	(Northern Ireland) Belfast Celtic	Windsor Park, Belfast
1943–44	(Northern Ireland) Glentoran (1)	2 – 1 (5 – 4 agg.)	(Northern Ireland) Belfast Celtic	Dalymount Park, Dublin
1944–45	(Republic of Ireland) Bohemians (1)	2 – 2	(Northern Ireland) Belfast Celtic	Windsor Park, Belfast
1944–45	(Republic of Ireland) Bohemians (1)	1 – 0 (3 – 2 agg.)	(Northern Ireland) Belfast Celtic	Dalymount Park, Dublin
1945–46	(Republic of Ireland) Shamrock Rovers (2)	3 – 1	(Northern Ireland) Belfast Celtic	Windsor Park, Belfast
1945–46	(Republic of Ireland) Shamrock Rovers (2)	0 – 1 (3 – 2 agg.)	(Northern Ireland) Belfast Celtic	Dalymount Park, Dublin
1946–47	(Republic of Ireland) Shamrock Rovers (3)	3 – 1	(Republic of Ireland) Drumcondra	Dalymount Park, Dublin
1946–47	(Republic of Ireland) Shamrock Rovers (3)	1 – 0 (4 – 1 agg.)	(Republic of Ireland) Drumcondra	Windsor Park, Belfast
1947–48	(Northern Ireland) Belfast Celtic (1) (Northern Ireland) Distillery (1)	2 – 1† (Note: The second leg of the final was not played and both teams agreed to share the trophy.)		Solitude, Belfast (1st leg)
1948–49	(Republic of Ireland) Shamrock Rovers (4)	3 – 0	(Republic of Ireland) Dundalk	Dalymount Park, Dublin

== Performance by club ==
Club	Winners	Runners-up	Winning years	Runners-up years
Shamrock Rovers	4	1	1942–43, 1945–46, 1946–47, 1948–49	1941–42
Belfast Celtic	1 (shared)	3	1947–48 (shared)	1943–44, 1944–45, 1945–46
Dundalk	1	1	1941–42	1948–49
Bohemians	1	1	1944–45	1942–43
Glentoran	1	0	1943–44	—
Distillery	1 (shared)	0	1947–48 (shared)	—
Drumcondra	0	1	—	1946–47

== See also ==
- Setanta Sports Cup
- Champions Cup (All-Ireland) sponsored by Unite the Union
