= Jody Byrne =

Irish footballer (born 1963)

Personal information
- Full name: Joseph Byrne
- Date of birth: 30 April 1963 (age 63)
- Place of birth: Dublin, Ireland
- Position: Goalkeeper

Senior career*
Years	Team	Apps	(Gls)
1981–1983	Dundalk	2	(0)
1983–1990	Shamrock Rovers	196	(0)
1990–1994	Shelbourne	135	(1)
1994–1995	Dundalk	15	(0)
1995–1996	Cork City	29	(0)
1996–1997	Drogheda United	27	(0)
1997	Waterford United	5	(0)
1997–1998	Finn Harps	27	(0)
1998–2001	Waterford United	7	(0)
2001–2002	St Patrick's Athletic	?	(0)
2001–2002	Dublin City	?	(0)

International career
1987–1995	League of Ireland XI	2	(0)
- * Club domestic league appearances and goals

Joseph "Jody" Byrne (born 30 April 1963) is an Irish retired footballer who played in the League of Ireland in the 1980s and 1990s.

== Career ==
After playing for Cambridge Boys he moved to Dundalk where he was an understudy to Richie Blackmore. He did make his debut, keeping a clean sheet, at Finn Harps on 13 February 1983. He made a total of 2 appearances for Dundalk keeping 2 clean sheets in his 2 years there.

In April 1983 he played for the League of Ireland XI U21s against their Italian League counterparts who included Roberto Mancini and Gianluca Vialli in their team.

In May 1983, Jim McLaughlin brought Byrne to Shamrock Rovers and at Milltown he went to win four League medals and the FAI Cup three times.

In his 7 years at Rovers Byrne played 196 league games keeping 76 clean sheets. He played 302 competitive games altogether including 8 games in the European Champion Clubs' Cup keeping 2 clean sheets. He was Player of the Year on two occasions in 1986/87 and 1988/89 Shamrock Rovers#Player of the Year Award recipients. He was everpresent for two consecutive seasons: 1987/88 and 1988/89.

In 1990, he moved to Shelbourne where he helped the Reds to their first league title in 30 years in 1992 and their first FAI Cup success in thirty years in 1993. He got sent off after only 27 seconds on St Patrick's Day 1992!.

He then had spells at Cork City and Dundalk again.

== Honours ==
=== Club ===
Shamrock Rovers

- League of Ireland / League of Ireland Premier Division (4): 1983-84, 1984-85, 1985-86, 1986-87
- FAI Cup (3): 1985, 1986, 1987
- LFA President's Cup (2): 1984-85, 1987–88
- Dublin City Cup (1): 1983-84

Shelbourne

- League of Ireland Premier Division (1): 1991-92
- FAI Cup (1): 1993

Dundalk

- League of Ireland Premier Division (1): 1994-95

=== Individual ===
- Shamrock Rovers Player of the Year (2): 1986-87, 1988–89
