= Shamrock Rovers F.C. =

Association football club in Ireland

Shamrock Rovers
- Full name: Shamrock Rovers Football Club
- Nickname: The Hoops
- Short name: Rovers
- Founded: 1899; 127 years ago
- Ground: Tallaght Stadium
- Capacity: 10,547
- Chairman: Ciaran Medlar
- Head Coach: Stephen Bradley
- League: League of Ireland Premier Division
- 2026: League of Ireland Premier Division, 1st of 10 (champions)
- Website: shamrockrovers.ie
Home colours	Away colours

Shamrock Rovers Football Club are an Irish professional football club based in the South Dublin suburb of Tallaght. The club's senior team competes in the League of Ireland Premier Division and it is the most successful club in the Republic of Ireland. The club has won the League of Ireland title a record 23 times and the FAI Cup a record 26 times. Shamrock Rovers have supplied more players to the Republic of Ireland national football team (64) than any other club. In All-Ireland competitions, such as the Intercity Cup, they hold the record for winning the most titles, having won seven cups overall.

The club was founded in Ringsend, Dublin, in 1899. They won the League title at the first attempt in the 1922–23 season and established themselves as the Republic of Ireland's most successful club by 1949, winning 44 major trophies. During the 1950s, the club won three League titles and two FAI Cups and became the first Irish team to compete in European competition, playing in the European Cup in 1957. They followed this by winning a record six FAI Cups in succession in the 1960s, when they were also one of the European club teams that spent the summer of 1967 in the United States, founding the United Soccer Association. They won the first of four League titles in a row in 1983–84, after a long decline. The club played at Glenmalure Park from 1926 to 1987 when the owners controversially sold the stadium to property developers. Shamrock Rovers spent the next 22 years playing home games at various venues around Dublin and on occasions, Ireland. They moved into Tallaght Stadium prior to the start of the 2009 season after years of delays and legal disputes, during which time the club's supporters saved them from extinction.

Shamrock Rovers wore green and white striped jerseys until 1926 when they adopted the green and white hooped strip that they have worn ever since. Their club badge has featured a football and a shamrock throughout their history. The club has a relatively large support base and shares an intense rivalry with Bohemians and St Patrick's Athletic. On 25 August 2011, Rovers became the first Irish side to reach the group stages of either of the top two European competitions by beating Partizan Belgrade in the play-off round of the Europa League. During the 2024–25 season, Shamrock Rovers became the first Irish side to qualify for the knockout stages of a European tournament as they advanced past the league phase of the UEFA Conference League. In the 2025-26 season, Shamrock Rovers won their 23rd League of Ireland Premier Division title.

== History ==
Chart of yearly table positions for Shamrock Rovers in League of Ireland

=== Foundation and early history ===
The foundation of Shamrock Rovers is disputed amongst supporters of the club. No official documentation of the era exists. For many years the earliest known mention of the club in the newspaper archives at the National Library of Ireland came from 1901, and an article in the club programme from 28 December 1941 claims that the club was founded in 1901. Research by the Shamrock Rovers Heritage Trust uncovered a very brief report in the Evening Herald from April 1899 on a match between Shamrock Rovers and Rosemount, which has established that the club was in existence from at least that time. The only two certainties about the origins of the club in relation to what year they were formed are the facts that, Rovers played only exhibition games for the first two years of their existence and the club registered with the Leinster Football Association in 1901. Essentially, the dispute is over whether the two years of exhibition games were played before or after the registration. Throughout the 1970s and 1980s, the date 1899 was written on the gates of Glenmalure Park but, since the 1990s, 1901 had been adopted as the founding year by the various regimes which have run the club. In light of the discovery of evidence supporting a founding date before April 1899 the club opened an "1899 Suite" in Tallaght Stadium in February 2017.

Shamrock Rovers originate from Ringsend, a Southside inner suburb of Dublin. The name of the club derives from Shamrock Avenue in Ringsend, where the first club rooms were secured. In September 1906, after a few seasons in operation, Rovers withdrew from the First Division of the Leinster Senior League. In 1914, they were resurrected and started playing their matches at Ringsend Park. On 17 April 1915, the side won the Irish Junior Cup, which was then the top junior competition organised on an all-Ireland basis. They defeated Derry Celtic Swifts 1–0 in the final, played in Dublin. However, Ringsend park became unavailable within two years. The club disbanded and played only exhibition games for the next five years. In 1921, Shamrock Rovers were resurrected once more, as a Leinster Senior League outfit, and reached the final of the inaugural FAI Cup, where they lost to St James's Gate in a fixture marred by crowd violence. The following season, the club won the League of Ireland title at the first attempt, going 21 games unbeaten and scoring 77 goals. In 1924, an influential member of the League winning side of two years earlier, Bob Fullam, returned to Rovers from Leeds United and combined with John Flood, John Fagan and Billy Farrell to complete the forward line known as The Four Fs. By the conclusion of their fifth season in the League of Ireland, the club had won three League titles and one FAI Cup. During the 1930s, the club won a further three League titles and five FAI Cups with Irish internationals, Paddy Moore and Jimmy Dunne playing key roles in their success, supported by crowds of up to 30,000 people at Glenmalure Park. By 1949, Shamrock Rovers had established themselves as Ireland's most successful football club. Their 44 major trophies included six League of Ireland titles, 11 FAI Cups, seven League of Ireland Shields, six Leinster Senior Cups, two Dublin City Cups, four Intercity Cups and eight President's Cups.

=== Coad's Colts ===
In November 1949, following the death of Jimmy Dunne, Paddy Coad accepted the position of player-manager having played with the club for almost eight years, in which time he had established himself as one of the best players in the League of Ireland. Coad opted for a radical youth policy and over the course of his first three years in charge, signed virtually the entire schoolboy international side to Rovers. He employed revolutionary training methods with extra emphasis on technical skill and possession which resulted in a fast, passing style of football that contributed significantly to the development of the game in Ireland. In 1954, the club won the League of Ireland for the first time in fifteen years, while Paddy Ambrose finished the season as the team's leading scorer. Led by players like Liam Tuohy and Coad himself, the team known as Coad's Colts proceeded to win two more league titles and two FAI Cups, concluding the golden era of Irish football as one of its most successful teams.

=== Six in a row ===
After the departure of Coad in 1960 and an unsuccessful season under Albie Murphy, Seán Thomas took on the role of rebuilding the Rovers team which had suffered from the break-up of Coad's Colts. Paddy Ambrose and Ronnie Nolan had remained with the club and were joined by a large selection of signings including Irish internationals, Frank O'Neill and Johnny Fullam. The decision by Liam Tuohy to return to the club as captain, after four successful years at Newcastle United, effectively saw the completion of Thomas' side. The club won every domestic honour except the Top Four Competition in the 1963–64 season and were narrowly defeated by holders and eventual finalists, Valencia, in the Inter-Cities Fairs Cup. Thomas, however, quit the Hoops at the end of the season following a dispute with the Cunninghams (Owners) over team selection. Liam Tuohy took over as player-manager and led the club to a further five FAI Cups in succession, completing a series of six, including a 3–0 defeat of League of Ireland champions, Waterford in 1968, in front of 40,000 people at Dalymount Park. The summer of 1967 had been spent in the United States, participating in the foundation of the United Soccer Association, where Rovers represented Boston as Boston Rovers. The 1968–69 season saw Mick Leech score a total of 56 goals for the club, including two in the last FAI Cup final of the Six in a Row period, against Cork Celtic.

=== Decline ===
The Hoops' defeat to Shelbourne in the first round of the FAI Cup in 1970, their first defeat in 32 Cup games over seven years, marked the start of the decline in the fortunes of the club. Despite only narrowly missing out on the League title in the 1970–71 season in controversial circumstances, the next twelve years proved to be a disaster for the club both on and off the field. On 25 April 1971, Rovers met Cork Hibs in Dalymount in a League play-off watched by 28,000 people. Their pre-match buildup was thrown into disarray when players and directors clashed over win bonuses. Hibs won the play-off 3–1. The next season, the Cunninghams, now under the control of sons Arthur and Des, sold the club to three brothers from Dublin; Paddy, Barton and Louis Kilcoyne. The Kilcoynes had witnessed decades of huge attendances at Irish football games and sought to take over the club primarily for business reasons. However, within the space of five years, the large crowds disappeared from Irish football stadia and combined with the demise of Drumcondra and Cork Hibs, the decline in fortunes of a number of top clubs and the lack of action by the FAI, the League of Ireland was plunged into a drastic decline. Faced with dwindling attendances, the Kilcoynes decided to starve the club and sold off senior players who were replaced by junior footballers. On a tour of Japan in 1975, Mick Meagan and Theo Dunne's young side defeated the Japanese national team 3–2 in front of 60,000 spectators at the Olympic Stadium, but that victory was the highlight of a season that saw the team finish bottom of the table and re-apply for admission into the League of Ireland.

In 1976, Meagan and Dunne resigned from the club and were replaced by Seán Thomas, the architect of the Six in a Row side, who with limited resources, re-signed Johnny Fullam and Mick Leech, as well as John Conway from Bohemians. Rovers finished the 1976–77 season in eleventh but won the club's only League of Ireland Cup, with Leech's 250th career goal proving the difference against Sligo. In July 1977, Irish international player-manager John Giles returned to Dublin to take up the same role at Rovers. The Kilcoynes implemented a full-time policy and unveiled plans to rebuild Glenmalure Park as a 50,000 all-seater stadium as well as turning the club into a school of excellence for Irish football, capable of challenging for European honours. Giles signed Irish internationals, Ray Treacy, Eamon Dunphy and Paddy Mulligan to complement the youth setup. In his first season in charge, the club won their 21st FAI Cup, defeating Sligo in a controversial final, but despite that success and emphatic victories in European competition against Apoel Nicosia and Fram Reykjavík, Giles' conservative approach based on possession football proved unsuccessful and on 3 February 1983, he resigned.

=== Four in a row ===
In the summer of 1983, Jim McLaughlin replaced Noel Campbell as Rovers' manager, after a successful period at Dundalk. Louis Kilcoyne made money available to McLaughlin who responded by selling and releasing almost the entire squad he had inherited from the Giles era, including fans' favourite, Alan O'Neill, while retaining the services of Liam Buckley, Harry Kenny, Alan Campbell and Peter Eccles. He brought in what was effectively a League of Ireland XI which included Jody Byrne and Noel King from Dundalk, Mick Neville from Drogheda, the trio of Eviston, Brady and O'Brien from Bohemians, and Anto Whelan and Neville Steedman from Manchester United and Thurles Town . On 1 April 1984, the club clinched their first League of Ireland title in 20 years with a 3–1 defeat of Shelbourne and 14 days later against Limerick at Glenmalure Park, midfielder and captain, Pat Byrne was presented with the trophy. Following that success, the club's two star strikers, Campbell and Buckley, were transferred to Racing de Santander and K.S.V. Waregem. McLaughlin replaced them with Mick Byrne and Noel Larkin and the pairing proved successful as the club won a further three League titles and three FAI Cups, with Byrne finishing the final season of the Four in a Row period as the League's top goalscorer. Dermot Keely managed and played for the club that year after McLaughlin's decision to transfer to Derry City The Hoops won 74 League games out of 100 from August 1983 to April 1987, losing only 11.

=== The homeless years (1987–2009) ===
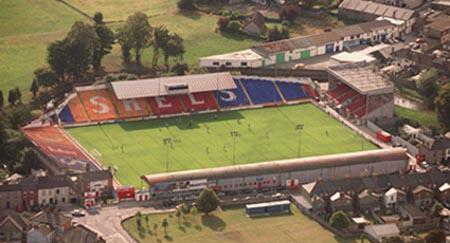
Tolka Park

Shortly after winning their 14th League title, Louis Kilcoyne announced that the Kilcoynes were selling Glenmalure Park, which they had recently purchased from the Jesuits. The team played the entire 1987–88 season in an almost empty Tolka Park as a result of a boycott called for by the Shamrock Rovers Supporters Club and KRAM (Keep Rovers at Milltown), which was observed by the vast majority of Hoops fans. Following the completion of the boycott season in Tolka, the Kilcoynes sold the football club to Dublin businessman John McNamara, who put forward a controversial proposal to move in with Bohemians at Dalymount Park. KRAM congregated to vote on whether to lift the boycott and on the proposal to move to Dalymount. Both motions were passed and the club spent the next two seasons at the Phibsboro venue, with an unrecognisable side playing in front of small attendances.

As the 1989–90 season concluded, the club announced that they were moving to the RDS Arena in Ballsbridge, located halfway between Ringsend and Milltown on the Southside of Dublin. On 30 September 1990, the RDS played host to Shamrock Rovers against St. Patrick's Athletic, in front of approximately 25,000 people . The fixture started a six-year period at the venue that included a League title-winning season in 1993–94. Ray Treacy managed the League winning side which included Paul Osam, Gino Brazil, John Toal, Alan Byrne and Stephen Geoghegan, who ended the season as top goalscorer. The next season, a number of key players were released as Treacy and McNamara enforced a tight budget and opted to rebuild the side with young players. The team began the season with a heavy defeat to Górnik Zabrze in the UEFA Cup and struggled their way to a midtable standing. They started the 1995–96 season badly and by late that season, after almost two years of growing supporter discontent at the running of the club, Treacy resigned, with McNamara following him shortly afterwards. One of McNamara's final acts was to appoint Alan O'Neill and Terry Eviston, who had both returned to the club in 1993, as joint managers of the side. They succeeded in removing the threat of relegation and almost guided the team to European qualification.

==== Long road to Tallaght ====
As the 1995–96 season concluded, John McNamara sold the club to Premier Computers, headed by Alan McGrath. McGrath unveiled a plan to build a state-of-the-art stadium in the Dublin southwest suburb of Tallaght, and employed Pat Byrne as commercial manager. However, after a couple of weeks and a loss in the first game of the season, O'Neill was dismissed, while Eviston resigned in solidarity. Byrne was appointed manager of the side playing in Tolka Park once again, and they struggled through the season with the League's joint top scorer, Tony Cousins playing a leading role in avoiding relegation. In May 1997, Alan McGrath resigned as club chairman and was replaced by Brian Kearney, also of Premier Computers, who succeeded in acquiring planning permission for the new stadium in January 1998. However, the permission was delayed by objections until November 1998, by which time Joe Colwell had replaced Kearney as chairman and ended Premier Computers' involvement with the club. On the pitch, Mick Byrne guided Rovers to an Intertoto Cup spot in 1997–98 and an eighth-place finish, the next season. He was replaced by Damien Richardson, who managed the club during their stay at Morton Stadium before his dismissal in April 2002, after a disagreement with Colwell. By that time, a half-built shell of a stadium stood at the Tallaght site; Mulden International Ltd, recruited by Colwell to complete the project, had pulled out of building the stadium. They leased it to a separate company, transferring the responsibility, and focused on four acres that they had retained for themselves.

==== Examinership and survival ====
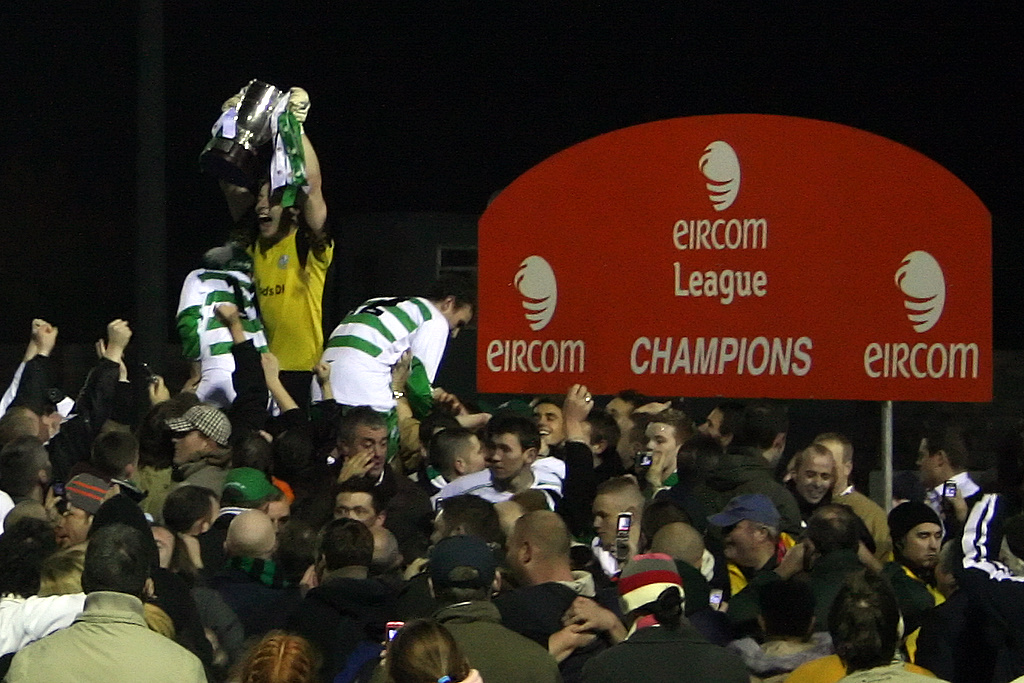
Promotion in 2006

Tony Maguire replaced Colwell as chairman and began the search for potential investors. In his first season as manager, Liam Buckley guided the club to the FAI Cup final and European qualification, as the team played at Richmond Park. The 2003 season was marked by the club's worsening finances as a deal with potential investor, Conor Clarkson was held up by Mulden's reluctance to sell their land. Having successfully applied for a one-year planning extension in October 2003, the club applied for a further extension a few months after Buckley's departure in September 2004. SDCC refused the application, but clarified their position by confirming their intention to build the stadium in partnership with the club, once the issue of ownership had been resolved. The trustees of the 400 Club (supporters group) informed the board of directors that they were no longer willing to bankroll their ownership of Shamrock Rovers.

Faced with the choice of remaining with Clarkson, whose plans were nullified by SDCC's decision, or cooperating with the council, Maguire chose the former and with Mulden's financing, initiated a High Court judicial review of the decision. The review failed and on 11 April 2005, facing debts of over two million Euro, the club entered into examinership. The 400 Club agreed to completely bankroll the club during the process. On 5 May 2005, Tony Maguire resigned on request by the FAI, who had discovered that the club had submitted their 2003 accounts in their application for a licence for the 2005 season. This resulted in a points deduction and subsequent relegation under Roddy Collins. The examinership concluded in July 2005 with the examiner accepting the 400 Club's bid for Shamrock Rovers, saving the club from extinction, and the supporters-owned club won promotion at the first attempt in 2006 under Pat Scully. The 2007 and 2008 seasons at Tolka Park were ones of overachievement and stability, but the major event of the period was the recommencement of building on the stadium after more than two years of legal disputes between the council and Thomas Davis CLG.

=== Tallaght ===
The 2009 season proved to be a progressive one for the club, starting with the completion of the stadium and ending with a second-place finish and qualification to the Europa League under the management of Michael O'Neill. Tallaght Stadium hosted the highest attendances in the League of Ireland, regularly selling out its capacity. The season was also marked by the visit of Real Madrid to Tallaght Stadium, where they defeated The Hoops 1–0 in front of a record attendance of 10,900 people. The team entered the 2010–11 Europa League in the second qualifying round and defeated Bnei Yehuda of Israel to progress to a third qualifying round tie against Juventus. The Italian side won the tie 3–0 on aggregate. Shamrock Rovers finished the 2010 season as champions, ending a 16-year drought by narrowly beating Bohemians to the title on goal difference. Rovers also got to the FAI Cup final, the first in the Aviva Stadium, where, in front of a crowd of over 30,000, they were defeated on penalties by Sligo Rovers.

==== 2011 season ====
In 2011 the club played its first-ever Champions League game and its first game in the highest level of European Cup Competition since the 1987–88 European Cup, beating Estonian Champions Flora Tallinn in the 2011–12 Champions League Second qualifying round. They accomplished this feat by triumphing 1–0 in the first leg at Tallaght Stadium and drawing 0–0 in the second leg in Estonia to advance 1–0 on aggregate. Rovers were then beaten 3–0 on aggregate in the next round by Danish Champions Copenhagen but advanced to the 2011–12 Europa League Play-off round. There they were drawn against Serbian Champions FK Partizan, whom they defeated 3–2 on aggregate (2–1 on the night after extra time) to reach the group stages of the Europa League. This marked a famous victory for Irish football, as it was the first time an Irish club had reached the group stages of a major European competition. Rovers also won the All Ireland Setanta Sports Cup in 2011 by defeating Dundalk in the final at Tallaght Stadium. Rovers wrapped up a second league title in a row with a last-minute victory over UCD at Belfield on 25 October 2011.

=== Bradley era ===
The club suffered something of a lean spell after the highs of the 2011 season. Michael O'Neill departed to manage the Northern Ireland national team and was replaced by Stephen Kenny. However, Kenny was fired after less than a full season in 2012. His successor Trevor Croly's tenure as manager was also shortlived. Despite winning two minor trophies, the League Cup and Setanta Cup in 2013, he was sacked halfway through the 2014 season. Pat Fenlon a former Rovers player was appointed the following season but he too failed to win major trophies. In 2016 he was replaced by Stephen Bradley, another former player, who at that time was coaching one of the club's underage sides. It took some time for Bradley to rebuild a winning team to challenge the then-dominant Dundalk.

However, through developing young players and astute signings such as Jack Byrne, Rovers steadily improved under Bradley's management. In 2019 Bradley's team won the FAI Cup, defeating Dundalk after penalties in the final, before a crowd of over 33,000, the first time that Rovers had won the Cup since 1987. The following season, a campaign truncated by the COVID-19 pandemic, Rovers won a shortened league season unbeaten. In the Europa League qualifying rounds Rovers were narrowly beaten 2–0 by Italian giants AC Milan. Dundalk denied Bradley's team a 'double' however, beating them in the FAI Cup Final, which due to the pandemic, was played behind closed doors. In 2021, despite losing star players such as Jack Byrne and Aaron McEneff, before the start of the season, Shamrock Rovers retained the title, finishing sixteen points ahead of nearest rival St Patrick's Athletic and lifting the trophy before a full house in Tallaght Stadium against Drogheda United. In 2022, Rovers won their third league title in a row, picking up the trophy in a 1–0 win against Derry City. The club also qualified for the group stages of the UEFA Conference League for the first time. Attendances also continued to improve, with an average of more than 6,000 fans attending home games in Tallaght stadium in 2022. In 2023 Shamrock Rovers again won the league title, equalling the record of four league championships in a row set by the club in the 1980s. However the team's European performance was disappointing, losing convincingly on aggregate to Icelandic side Breidablik in the Champions League qualifiers and Hungarian champions Ferencváros in the Europa league.

In 2024, by contrast, Rovers lost their league title, finishing second to Shelbourne, but had a lucrative run in Europe, again qualifying for the group stages of the UEFA Conference League, defeating Vikingur of Iceland and NK Celje of Slovenia. Rovers won three out of five games in the group stages, against Larne FC, The New Saints and FK Borac Banja Luka, drawing with Apoel Nicosia and Rapid Vienna and only losing to eventual winners Chelsea FC. This meant that Rovers became the first Irish club to qualify for a European knock out stage, qualifying to a play off against Molde of Norway, which they narrowly lost on penalties.

In 2025, Rovers qualified for the UEFA Conference League for the second year in a row after beating Portuguese side Santa Clara. It was also the first successful qualification, into a European competition, of a League of Ireland club that did not finish the previous season as league champions. They also secured the double, winning their 22nd league title and their 26th FAI Cup in a 2-0 win in the 2025 FAI Cup Final against Cork City. On 23 October 2026, Shamrock Rovers won their 23rd League title after a 4-0 win against Sligo Rovers.

== Colours and badge ==
Foundation–1926

Until 1926, Shamrock Rovers wore green and white striped jerseys but following a suggestion by a committee member, John Sheridan, the club chose to adopt the green and white hooped strip. A close relationship existed between the club and Belfast Celtic and it was on account of this that the idea was formed. The first game featuring the new jerseys was against Bray Unknowns in a FAI Cup match on 9 January 1927 at Shelbourne Park. The Hoops lost the game 3–0 and senior members of the club considered abandoning the new strip. Despite this loss, the team continued to wear green and white hoops and have done ever since. The 2007 season was the first season since the hoops were introduced that they were not continuous around the main body of the jersey. The style of the shirt sleeves has been changed on numerous occasions. The away colours of the club have varied over time. In the early 1980s, the club had a yellow away jersey. In the mid-1990s, a hooped purple jersey was adopted. In 2011, the team wore an all-black away strip.

The club emblem features a football and a shamrock and has done so throughout the history of the club. Minor alterations to the club badge have included changing the style of the shamrock and the width of the diagonal lines. In 2005, a star was added above the badge to signify the first 10 League of Ireland titles won by the club. After the takeover of the club by the supporters, black became the club's third official colour in recognition of the loss of Glenmalure Park. It was also decided that the number 12 would no longer be worn by any Shamrock Rovers player and instead would represent the club's supporters.

== Stadiums ==
=== Glenmalure Park ===
On 11 September 1926, Shamrock Rovers played their first game at Glenmalure Park, Milltown against Dundalk, having previously played at Ringsend Park, Shelbourne Park, Windy Arbour and a different pitch behind the famous Milltown one. The official opening took place on Sunday, 19 September 1926 as Belfast Celtic provided the opposition in an exhibition game. When the Cunninghams acquired the club in the 1930s, the stadium was named Glenmalure Park in honour of their ancestral home in Glenmalure. They completed the stadium with the addition of terraces, one of which was covered. The stadium remained essentially unaltered from then until its demolition in 1990, excluding the destruction of a small terrace and the erection of floodlights in the 1980s. Its capacity was approximately 20,000 for most of its existence, its largest recorded attendance being 28,000, set against Waterford in 1968. Larger, unreported, attendances were present at the venue before then.

In 1987, the Kilcoynes decided to sell the stadium to property developers, having recently purchased it from the Jesuits. The last game at Glenmalure Park was an FAI Cup semi-final between Shamrock Rovers and Sligo Rovers on 12 April 1987. The game saw a pitch invasion by supporters protesting against the sale of the stadium. The next season, the supporters formed an association called Keep Rovers at Milltown and placed a picket on home games at Tolka Park, effectively bankrupting the club's owners. They accumulated funds, through supporter contributions, in an effort to purchase the stadium but failed to match the offer of a property developer to whom the Kilcoynes eventually sold the site. After a lengthy appeals process, Glenmalure Park was demolished in 1990 to be replaced by an apartment complex.

=== Tallaght Stadium ===
In the 1990s, Shamrock Rovers were granted land in the Dublin suburb of Tallaght to build a new stadium. On 30 March 2000, Taoiseach Bertie Ahern turned the sod at the site. However, work on the stadium ceased in 2001 and in March 2005, South Dublin County Council announced that they were taking back the land that they had granted to the club, as the conditions of the planning permission had not been met. A public consultation process was initiated in July 2005 and a resolution was passed in December 2005 to alter the stadium to accommodate senior GAA games while still having Shamrock Rovers as the preferred tenants. This decision was subject to additional government funding. This funding was not made available and on 13 January 2006 the council voted to proceed with the original plan.

This second vote was challenged by a local Gaelic Athletic Association club, Thomas Davis who wanted the vote on 13 January 2006 declared illegal thus forcing the county council to build the GAA stadium. Thomas Davis claimed that the capacity of the stadium (initially 6,000, ultimately 10,000) would not be affected by the change, the other parties involved disputed this and argued that the capacity would be reduced. Requests under the freedom of information act to both South Dublin County Council and the Department of Sport showed that Thomas Davis had not submitted any plans showing that capacity would not be affected.

Thomas Davis GAA club instituted judicial review proceedings in the High Court in May 2006. Their main argument was that the decision of the council on 13 February 2006 to revert to the original plans for the stadium, which did not include a senior GAA pitch, was unlawful. Their submission on the technical point was accompanied by cultural arguments that 'the youth of Tallaght will be restricted to a diet of Association football' and that a soccer-only ground would place the 'applicant at a severe disadvantage in attracting the youth of Tallaght to the club, the sport and the GAA culture. The stadium, however, with the original design, could accommodate youth GAA games as the pitch used at this level fits within the stadium's dimensions. It was only adult GAA games that would not have been facilitated.

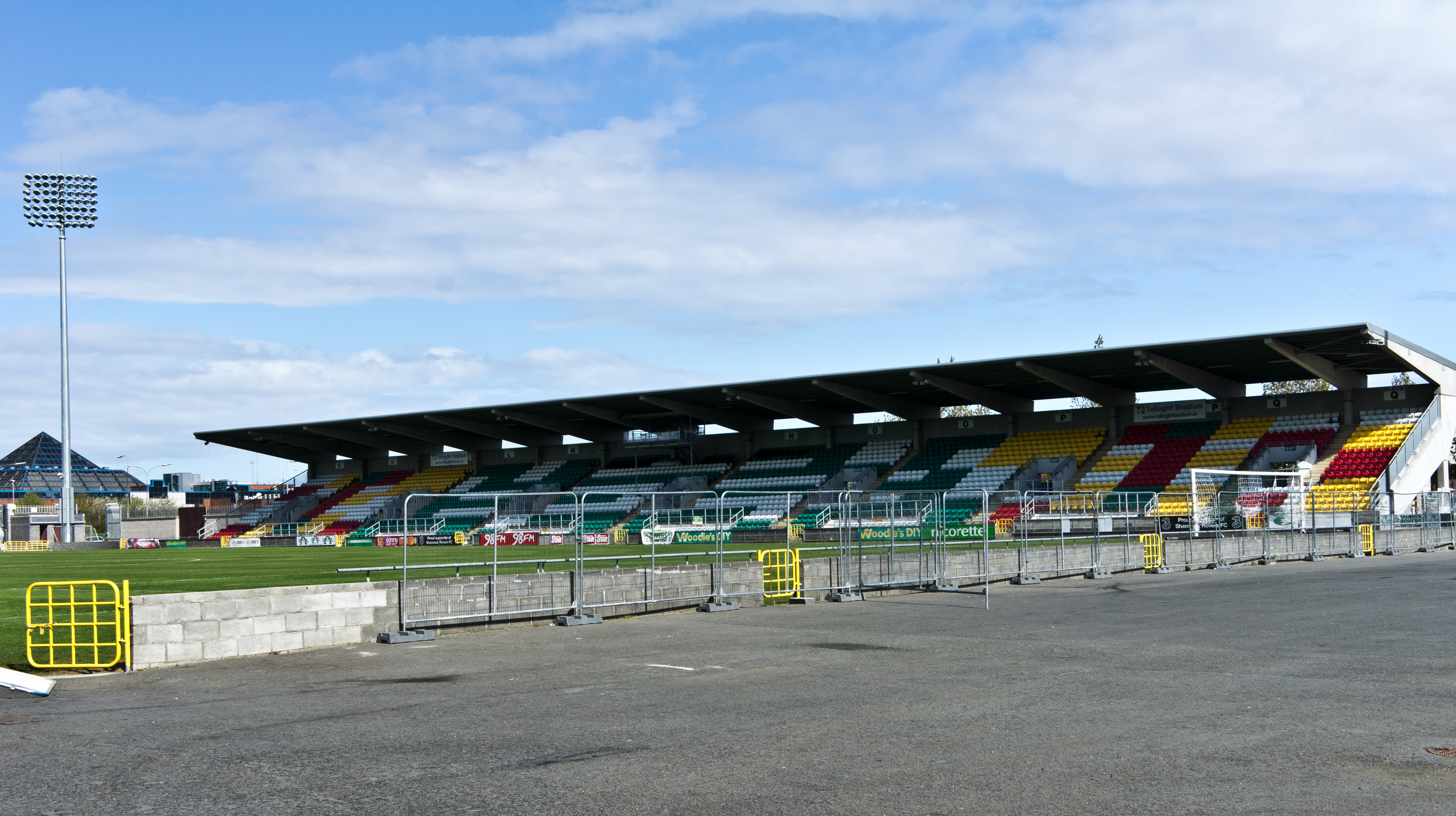
Tallaght Stadium in 2011

The then Minister for Arts, Sport and Tourism, John O'Donoghue, consistently supported the government's decision to support the stadium with soccer pitch dimensions, and claimed that the GAA were stalling the project which he believed they had no need for on top of their own site in Rathcoole. On 14 December 2006 the Football Association of Ireland pledged financial assistance for the Hoops' High Court battle involving Thomas Davis.

The judicial review began on 20 April 2007 and concluded on 14 December 2007. In the High Court decision Mr. Justice Roderick Murphy found in favour of South Dublin Co. Council and Shamrock Rovers. South Dublin County Council were correct in their 13 February 2006 vote to proceed with the stadium as originally planned. An application by Thomas Davis for leave to appeal this decision to the Supreme court was refused by Judge Murphy on 25 January 2008. Building commenced on the stadium on 6 May 2008. Shamrock Rovers played their first 'home' game in over 20 years in the stadium in March 2009.

== Ownership ==
Shamrock Rovers F.C. is partially owned (50%) by the Shamrock Rovers Members Club, with businessman Ray Wilson owning 50% of the club from 2016 to 2019. Since 2019, Wilson has held 25% of the club's shares, with a further 25% bought in that year by businessman Dermot Desmond. The Shamrock Rovers Members Club was originally formed as the 400 Club in November 2002, by the then privately owned football club's board of directors, to raise funds through the fan base, with the sole purpose of facilitating a mortgage for the development of the stalled stadium project in Tallaght. The monthly membership fee was set at €40. However, it became apparent to the members that the funds raised were being used for purposes outside of the stated objective. As a result, the membership took control of the 400 Club, adopted a transparent structure and constitution, and declared itself totally independent of the then board of Shamrock Rovers. The 400 Club consortium played a crucial role in the survival of Shamrock Rovers when the club entered examinership in April 2005. They paid off a portion of the club's debts and assumed responsibility for running it. Preferential creditors received 4.25% of what was owed and unsecured creditors received 2.12%. Preferential creditors were due $444,700, unsecured creditors were due €1.66 million. After the successful acquisition of the club through the examinership process, the 400 Club Trustees became the Board of Directors of Shamrock Rovers Football Club and began the process of building a sustainable club through sensible business practices. Numerous clubs and supporters groups subsequently sought their advice with regard to using the model of the 400 club elsewhere. At the annual meeting of the 400 Club in 2006, the members voted to rename it as the SRFC Members Club, reflecting the reality of their ownership of the football club. At the 2008 meeting, the monthly membership fee was increased to €50. In January 2012, there were more than 400 members of the club. Membership is open to all.

== Supporters and rivalries ==
The majority of Shamrock Rovers supporters originate from the Southside of Dublin, but the club attracts fans from across the city and country. Since its foundation, the club has maintained a proud Irish identity, and their supporters reflect this in the flags and banners they display. Their support base contains a number of clubs dedicated to supporting the team at away games. It also contains an ultras group, which was the first formed in Ireland, the SRFC Ultras, who produce choreographed displays of support at games. They have connections with other European groups including supporters of Roma, Hammarby and Panathinaikos.

Until the 1970s, Glenmalure Park regularly hosted attendances in the region of 20,000 people, but as the majority of the Irish public turned its back on Irish football, those numbers declined and despite winning the League of Ireland four times in succession in the 1980s, the attendances for the period averaged approximately a quarter of that figure. The sale of the stadium contributed to a further decline in support. During the homeless years, particularly those spent on the Northside, attendances continued to fall with the exception of those recorded during the club's residence at the RDS, which included an opening attendance of 22,000. Prior to the relocation to Tallaght, the club's support base had been reduced to a hardcore group of over a thousand people. However attendances improved markedly once the club moved to Tallaght stadium. As of 2010, the club had approximately 2,700 season ticket holders. The end of COVID-19 pandemic limitations on outdoor events coincided with a major boost in league attendances generally, from which Rovers also benefited. As of 2023, Rovers' average attendance stood at 6,109, the largest in the league. In 2024, with all four stands at Tallaght Stadium completed, Rovers achieved their first sell out at the new capacity over of 10,000 for the game against Bohemians. The number of season tickets sold for the 2024 season stood at over 4,200.

Throughout their history, Shamrock Rovers have shared many rivalries of differing importance and intensity. The oldest such rivalry is that shared with Shelbourne, formed on the basis of the clubs' foundations in Ringsend. It remains as a secondary rivalry of similar importance to the local derby contested with St. Patrick's Athletic. During the 1950s and 1960s, the club's principal rival was the now-defunct, Drumcondra. In the 1970s, they were replaced as the major club on the Northside by Bohemians. Since then, the relatively minor rivalry that existed between Shamrock Rovers and Bohemians has developed into a classic rivalry, producing intense games and large attendances.

== Other teams ==
=== Shamrock Rovers II ===
Throughout its history Rovers have entered reserve teams in various leagues including the Leinster Senior League Senior Division, the League of Ireland B Division, the A Championship and the League of Ireland U19 Division. In 2014 they played in the League of Ireland First Division. In January 2020, it was announced that a team with the name Shamrock Rovers II would be entering the 2020 League of Ireland First Division

=== Youth setup ===
The current schoolboys' sections of Shamrock Rovers date back to 1996 when Rovers and Tallaght Town AFC merged to form a new section to serve the Tallaght area of South West Dublin. Tallaght Town initially remained in operation as a limited company and as trustee of a training facility used by the youth teams at Shamrock Rovers. The partnership between the two clubs broke up again in the mid-2000s, with Tallaght Town retaining the training facility at Carolan Park in Kiltipper. However, the schoolboy or underage section remained with Shamrock Rovers and was fully absorbed into the club once Rovers began playing at Tallaght Stadium in 2009. From then until 2014, Shamrock Rovers underage teams continued to play and train at Tallaght Town's grounds at Kiltipper. However, in that year Rovers acquired their own training ground at Roadstone in Clondalkin, and the club's underage as well as first-team moved their training base there. Shamrock Rovers also opened their own football academy at the site. The Roadstone facility has an AstroTurf pitch and two hybrid pitches (mainly grass) which were built to replace the existing grass pitches during 2016–17. The training ground was officially opened in 2017. As of February 2023, former player Shane Robinson is the director of the academy.

Over 200 underage players play for Shamrock Rovers. The club has teams at every age from under-8 up to under-13 playing in the Dublin and District Schoolboy League as well as U14, U15, U17 & U19 male teams in the elite underage FAI National League. In addition, there is an under-17 women's team and an amputee team. A Sunday morning academy, for children between the ages of 4 and 6, is also in operation. The club's youth teams have participated in the Milk Cup and Dallas Cup. In recent years, the Shamrock Rovers Academy has successfully brought many young players through to the professional game including Irish international goalkeeper Gavin Bazunu, who was transferred to Manchester City FC and Kevin Zefi to Inter Milan, as well as players such as Trevor Clarke, Aaron Bolger, Aidomo Emakhu and Justin Ferizaj who have made it through to the Rovers first team.

The club operates scholarships covering all levels of education. Players at the academy also receive tuition for the Leaving Certificate at Ashfield College with whom Rovers have a partnership. The club also runs a scheme for transition year students that allows one age group (Under 15s) to train at Roadstone each week morning and study in the afternoons in a classroom at Roadstone. the club also has a community officer and has partnerships with underage football clubs and schools in the local area.

== Players ==
=== First-team squad ===
As of 13 November 2026

Note: Flags indicate national team as defined under FIFA eligibility rules; some limited exceptions apply. Players may hold more than one non-FIFA nationality.

No.	Pos.	Nation	Player
1	GK	IRL	Edward McGinty
2	DF	WAL	Adam Matthews
3	DF	IRL	Enda Stevens
4	DF	CPV	Pico Lopes
5	DF	IRL	Lee Grace
6	DF	IRL	Daniel Cleary
7	MF	IRL	Dylan Watts
8	MF	IRL	Matt Healy
9	FW	IRL	Aaron Greene
10	FW	IRL	Graham Burke
11	FW	IRL	Jake Mulraney
14	MF	IRL	Danny Mandroiu
16	MF	IRL	Gary O'Neill
17	DF	IRL	Luke O'Regan
18	FW	IRL	Jonathan Afolabi
19	MF	IRL	Adam Brennan

No.	Pos.	Nation	Player
21	MF	IRL	Danny Grant
22	DF	IRL	Tunmise Sobowale
23	MF	ENG	Connor Malley
24	MF	IRL	Will Fitzgerald
25	GK	IRL	Lee Steacy
26	MF	IRL	John O'Sullivan
27	DF	IRL	Cory O'Sullivan
28	MF	IRL	Naj Razi
29	MF	IRL	Jack Byrne
30	GK	IRL	Todd Bazunu
33	MF	IRL	Cian Barrett
37	FW	IRL	Matthew Britton
38	MF	IRL	Max Kovalevskis
88	FW	NIR	John McGovern
—	DF	IRL	Egor Vassenin
—	DF	IRL	Sean Murphy

=== Out on loan ===
Note: Flags indicate national team as defined under FIFA eligibility rules; some limited exceptions apply. Players may hold more than one non-FIFA nationality.

No.	Pos.	Nation	Player
41	GK	IRL	Alex Noonan (on loan at Ipswich Town)

=== Retired numbers ===
12 – 12th man

== Technical staff ==
As of 3 August 2025

Position	Staff
Sporting Director	Ronan Finn
Head coach	Stephen Bradley
Assistant Coach	Glenn Cronin
GK Coach	José Ferrer
S&C Coach	Darren Dillon
Physio	Tony McCarthy
U19 Head Coach	Aidan Price
U19 Assistant Coach	Steven Gray
Women's U19 Head Coach	Tony O'Neill
U17 Head Coach	Tony Cousins
U17 Assistant Coach	Chris McDonnell
Women's U17 Head Coach	Eoghan O'Meara
U15 Head Coach	Jason Shields
U14 Head Coach	Graham Gartland
U14 Assistant Coach	Pat Flynn

== Honours ==
=== Senior ===
- League of Ireland/League of Ireland Premier Division: 23 (record)
  - 1922–23, 1924–25, 1926–27, 1931–32, 1937–38, 1938–39, 1953–54, 1956–57, 1958–59, 1963–64
    1983–84, 1984–85, 1985–86, 1986–87, 1993–94, 2010, 2011, 2020, 2021, 2022
    2023, 2025, 2026
- FAI Cup: 26 (record)
  - 1924–25, 1928–29, 1929–30, 1930–31, 1931–32, 1932–33, 1935–36, 1939–40, 1943–44, 1944–45, 1947–48, 1954–55, 1955–56, 1961–62, 1963–64, 1964–65, 1965–66, 1966–67, 1967–68, 1968–69, 1977–78, 1984–85, 1985–86, 1986–87, 2019, 2025
- League of Ireland First Division
  - 2006
- League of Ireland Shield: 18 (record)
  - 1924–25, 1926–27, 1931–32, 1932–33, 1934–35, 1937–38, 1941–42, 1949–50, 1951–52, 1954–55, 1955–56,
    1956–57, 1957–58, 1962–63, 1963–64, 1964–65, 1965–66, 1967–68
- League of Ireland Cup: 2
  - 1976–77, 2013
- LFA President's Cup: 21 (record)
  - 1929–30 (shared), 1932–33, 1940–41, 1941–42, 1943–44, 1944–45, 1945–46, 1948–49, 1954–55, 1956–57, 1957–58, 1959–60, 1962–63, 1968–69, 1969–70, 1970–71, 1972–73, 1984–85, 1985–86, 1986–87, 1987–88
- Dublin City Cup: 10
  - 1944–45, 1947–48, 1952–53, 1954–55, 1956–57, 1957–58, 1959–60, 1963–64, 1966–67, 1983–84
- Top Four Cup: 3
  - 1955–56, 1957–58, 1965–66
- FAI Super Cup: 1
  - 1998–99
- Setanta Sports Cup: 2
  - 2011, 2013
- Blaxnit Cup: 1
  - 1967–68
- Dublin and Belfast Inter-City Cup: 4
  - 1942–43, 1945–46, 1946–47, 1948–49
- Tyler Cup: 1
  - 1977–78
- President of Ireland's Cup: 2
  - 2022, 2024
- Leinster Senior League: 1
  - 1921–22 ^{See Note 1}
- Leinster Senior Cup: 18
  - 1922–23, 1926–27, 1928–29, 1929–30, 1932–33, 1937–38, 1952–53, 1954–55, 1955–56, 1956–57, 1957–58, 1963–64, 1968–69, 1981–82, 1984–85, 1996–97, 2011–12, 2012–13

=== Notes ===
- ^1 Shamrock Rovers B also won this league in 1924–25 and 1939–40

== Managers ==
List of managers
1937–1942: Jimmy Dunne; 1942–1945: Bob Fullam; 1947–1949: Jimmy Dunne; 1949–1960: Paddy Coad; 1960–1961: Albie Murphy; 1961–1964: Seán Thomas; 1964–1969: Liam Tuohy; 1969–1969: Arthur Fitzsimons; 1969–1971: Frank O'Neill; 1971–1971: Billy Young; 1971–1972: Paddy Ambrose (Caretaker)	1972–1973: Liam Tuohy; 1973–1974: Keogh/Wood (Caretaker); 1974–1976: Mick Meagan; 1976–1977: Seán Thomas; 1977–1983: John Giles; 1983–1983: Noel Campbell; 1983–1986: Jim McLaughlin; 1986–1988: Dermot Keely; 1988–1992: Noel King; 1992–1996: Ray Treacy; 1996–1996: Alan O'Neill/Terry Eviston	1996–1997: Pat Byrne; 1997–1999: Mick Byrne; 1999–2002: Damien Richardson; 2002–2004: Liam Buckley; 2004–2004: Noel Synnott (Caretaker); 2004–2005: Roddy Collins; 2005–2005: Alan O'Neill (Caretaker); 2006–2008: Pat Scully; 2008–2008: Jim Crawford (Caretaker); 2009–2011: Michael O'Neill; 2012: Stephen Kenny	2012: Brian Laws; 2013–2014: Trevor Croly; 2014–2016: Pat Fenlon; 2016– : Stephen Bradley

== Player of the Year ==
Player of the Year
1979–1980: Robbie Gaffney; 1980–1981: Harry Kenny; 1981–1982: Liam Buckley; 1982–1983: Liam Buckley; 1983–1984: Alan Campbell; 1984–1985: Pat Byrne; 1985–1986: Mick Neville; 1986–1987: Jody Byrne	1987–1988: Mick Byrne; 1988–1989: Jody Byrne; 1989–1990: Vinny Arkins; 1990–1991: Dave Connell; 1991–1992: Dave Connell; 1992–1993: Peter Eccles; 1993–1994: Alan Byrne; 1994–1995: Gino Brazil	1995–1996: Alan O'Neill; 1996–1997: Tony Cousins; 1997–1998: Matt Britton; 1998–1999: Tony O'Dowd; 1999–2000: Terry Palmer; 2000–2001: Tony Grant; 2001–2002: Shane Robinson; 2002–2003: Noel Hunt	2003: Glen Fitzpatrick; 2004: Trevor Molloy; 2005: Barry Murphy; 2006: Aidan Price; 2007: Ger O'Brien; 2008: Darragh Maguire; 2009: Gary Twigg; 2010: Stephen Rice	2011: Craig Sives; 2012: Ronan Finn; 2013: Barry Murphy; 2014: Barry Murphy; 2015: Brandon Miele; 2016: Simon Madden; 2017: Gary Shaw; 2018: Lee Grace	2019: Jack Byrne; 2020: Roberto Lopes; 2021: Danny Mandroiu; 2022: Rory Gaffney; 2023: Lee Grace; 2024: Dylan Watts; 2025: Graham Burke

== Records and statistics ==
Games
- 100th League game: Shamrock Rovers 3–1 Athlone (24 September 1927)
- 500th League game: Shamrock Rovers 2–0 Shelbourne (21 April 1948)
- 1000th League game: Dundalk 1–0 Shamrock Rovers (20 February 1971)
- 1500th League game: Shamrock Rovers 2–0 Athlone (22 January 1989)
- 2000th League game: Shamrock Rovers 1–2 Drogheda (22 October 2004)
- 2500th League game: St. Patrick's Athletic 0-2 Shamrock Rovers (1 July 2019)

Results
- Largest victory:
  Shamrock Rovers 11–0 Bray Unknowns (28 October 1928)
- Largest defeat:
  St James's Gate 7–0 Shamrock Rovers (22 April 1937)
  Cork City 7–0 Shamrock Rovers (31 August 1938)
  Górnik Zabrze 7–0 Shamrock Rovers (1994–95)

=== European record ===
Shamrock Rovers have a long history in European competition. In the 1957–58 season they were the first League of Ireland side to enter European competition (Glenavon from the Irish League having entered in the same season) and featured regularly in the 1960s and 1980s. The club has had some relative success with victories in the Intertoto-Cup and the Europa League. Throughout their participation Rovers have beaten teams from Luxembourg, Cyprus, Iceland and Germany, and were the first Irish club to beat teams from Turkey, Poland, Israel, Serbia Slovakia, Albania and Hungary. Their first victory in the UEFA Champions League came in a 1–0 victory in the 2011–12 qualifying phase against FC Flora Tallinn at Tallaght Stadium.

Their biggest win was a 7–0 aggregate victory (3–0 away, 4–0 home) over Fram Reykjavik in the UEFA Cup first round in September 1982.

On 25 August 2011, they became the first Irish team to qualify for the UEFA Europa League group stage when they defeated Partizan Belgrade 2–1 after extra-time in Serbia, for a 3–2 aggregate victory.

Rovers qualified for the group stages of the 2022–23 UEFA Europa Conference League.

In the 2024–25 UEFA Conference League, Shamrock Rovers became the first League of Ireland side to qualify for the knockout stage of a UEFA club competition. With a 4–1 league phase win over Larne, they also became the first League of Ireland side across five campaigns (three for Rovers and two for Dundalk) to win away from home in a UEFA group stage/league stage match.

In 2026, Shamrock Rovers became the first Irish club to be eliminated from all three European competitions during the qualifying stages following defeats to Ararat-Armenia in the UEFA Champions League, Egnatia in the UEFA Europa League and KuPS in the UEFA Conference League.

==== Overview ====
Correct as of 27 August 2026

Competition	Pld	W	D	L	GF	GA
European Cup / UEFA Champions League	35	5	8	22	21	56
Inter-Cities Fairs Cup / UEFA Cup / UEFA Europa League	52	14	9	29	53	94
UEFA Europa Conference League / UEFA Conference League	35	11	8	16	39	49
European Cup Winners' Cup / UEFA Cup Winners Cup	16	5	2	9	19	27
UEFA Intertoto Cup	6	3	0	3	7	10
TOTAL	143	38	27	78	139	234

==== Matches ====
Season	Competition	Round	Opponent	Home	Away	Aggregate
1957–58	European Cup	PR	(England) Manchester United	0–6	2–3	2–9
1959–60	European Cup	PR	(France) Nice	1–1	2–3	3–4
1962–63	European Cup Winners' Cup	1R	(Bulgaria) Botev Plovdiv	0–4	0–1	0–5
1963–64	Inter-Cities Fairs Cup	1R	(Spain) Valencia	2–2	0–1	2–3
1964–65	European Cup	PR	(Austria) Rapid Wien	0–2	0–3	0–5
1965–66	Inter-Cities Fairs Cup	2R	(Spain) Real Zaragoza	1–1	1–2	2–3
1966–67	European Cup Winners' Cup	1R	Spora Luxembourg	4–1	4–1	8–2
1966–67	European Cup Winners' Cup	2R	(West Germany) Bayern Munich	1–1	2–3	3–4
1967–68	European Cup Winners' Cup	1R	(Wales) Cardiff City	1–1	0–2	1–3
1968–69	European Cup Winners' Cup	1R	(Denmark) Randers	1–2	0–1	1–3
1969–70	European Cup Winners' Cup	1R	(West Germany) Schalke 04	2–1	0–3	2–4
1978–79	European Cup Winners' Cup	1R	(Cyprus) APOEL	2–0	1–0	3–0
1978–79	European Cup Winners' Cup	2R	(Czechoslovakia) Baník Ostrava	1–3	0–3	1–6
1982–83	UEFA Cup	1R	(Iceland) Fram	4–0	3–0	7–0
1982–83	UEFA Cup	2R	(Romania) Universitatea Craiova	0–2	0–3	0–5
1984–85	European Cup	1R	(Northern Ireland) Linfield	1–1	0–0	1–1 (a)
1985–86	European Cup	1R	(Hungary) Budapest Honvéd	1–3	0–2	1–5
1986–87	European Cup	1R	(Scotland) Celtic	0–1	0–2	0–3
1987–88	European Cup	1R	(Cyprus) Omonia	0–1	0–0	0–1
1994–95	UEFA Cup	PR	(Poland) Górnik Zabrze	0–1	0–7	0–8
1998	UEFA Intertoto Cup	1R	(Turkey) Altay	3–2	1–3	4–5
2002–03	UEFA Cup	QR	(Sweden) Djurgården	1–3	0–2	1–5
2003	UEFA Intertoto Cup	1R	(Poland) Odra Wodzisław	2–1	1–0	3–1
2003	UEFA Intertoto Cup	2R	(Czech Republic) Slovan Liberec	0–2	0–2	0–4
2010–11	UEFA Europa League	2Q	(Israel) Bnei Yehuda	1–1	1–0	2–1
2010–11	UEFA Europa League	3Q	(Italy) Juventus	0–2	0–1	0–3
2011–12	UEFA Champions League	2Q	(Estonia) Flora Tallinn	1–0	0–0	1–0
2011–12	UEFA Champions League	3Q	(Denmark) Copenhagen	0–2	0–1	0–3
2011–12	UEFA Europa League	PO	(Serbia) Partizan	1–1	2–1	3–2
2011–12	UEFA Europa League	Group A	(Russia) Rubin Kazan	0–3	1–4	4th
2011–12	UEFA Europa League	Group A	(England) Tottenham Hotspur	0–4	1–3	4th
2011–12	UEFA Europa League	Group A	(Greece) PAOK	1–3	1–2	4th
2012–13	UEFA Champions League	2Q	(Lithuania) Ekranas	0–0	1–2	1–2
2015–16	UEFA Europa League	1Q	(Luxembourg) Progrès Niederkorn	3–0	0–0	3–0
2015–16	UEFA Europa League	2Q	(Norway) Odd	0–2	1–2	1–4
2016–17	UEFA Europa League	1Q	(Finland) RoPS	0–2	1–1	1–3
2017–18	UEFA Europa League	1Q	(Iceland) Stjarnan	1–0	1–0	2–0
2017–18	UEFA Europa League	2Q	(Czech Republic) Mladá Boleslav	2–3	0–2	2–5
2018–19	UEFA Europa League	1Q	(Sweden) AIK	0−1	1–1 (a.e.t.)	1–2
2019–20	UEFA Europa League	1Q	(Norway) Brann	2–1	2–2	4–3
2019–20	UEFA Europa League	2Q	(Cyprus) Apollon Limassol	2–1	1–3 (a.e.t.)	3–4
2020–21	UEFA Europa League	1Q	(Finland) Ilves	2–2 (12–11 p)	—N/a	—N/a
2020–21	UEFA Europa League	2Q	(Italy) Milan	0–2	—N/a	—N/a
2021–22	UEFA Champions League	1Q	(Slovakia) Slovan Bratislava	2–1	0–2	2–3
2021–22	UEFA Europa Conference League	3Q	(Albania) Teuta	1–0	2–0	3–0
2021–22	UEFA Europa Conference League	PO	(Estonia) Flora	0–1	2–4	2–5
2022–23	UEFA Champions League	1Q	(Malta) Hibernians	3–0	0–0	3–0
2022–23	UEFA Champions League	2Q	(Bulgaria) Ludogorets Razgrad	2–1	0–3	2–4
2022–23	UEFA Europa League	3Q	(North Macedonia) Shkupi	3–1	2–1	5–2
2022–23	UEFA Europa League	PO	(Hungary) Ferencváros	1–0	0–4	1–4
2022–23	UEFA Europa Conference League	Group F	(Belgium) Gent	1–1	0–3	4th
2022–23	UEFA Europa Conference League	Group F	(Norway) Molde	0–2	0–3	4th
2022–23	UEFA Europa Conference League	Group F	(Sweden) Djurgården	0–0	0–1	4th
2023–24	UEFA Champions League	1Q	(Iceland) Breiðablik	0–1	1–2	1–3
2023–24	UEFA Europa Conference League	2Q	(Hungary) Ferencváros	0–2	0–4	0–6
2024–25	UEFA Champions League	1Q	(Iceland) Víkingur Reykjavík	2–1	0–0	2–1
2024–25	UEFA Champions League	2Q	(Czech Republic) Sparta Prague	0–2	2–4	2–6
2024–25	UEFA Europa League	3Q	(Slovenia) Celje	3–1 (a.e.t.)	0–1	3–2
2024–25	UEFA Europa League	PO	(Greece) PAOK	0–2	0–4	0–6
2024–25	UEFA Conference League	LP	(Cyprus) APOEL	1–1	—N/a	10th
2024–25	UEFA Conference League	LP	(Northern Ireland) Larne	—N/a	4–1	10th
2024–25	UEFA Conference League	LP	(Wales) The New Saints	2–1	—N/a	10th
2024–25	UEFA Conference League	LP	(Austria) Rapid Vienna	—N/a	1–1	10th
2024–25	UEFA Conference League	LP	(Bosnia and Herzegovina) Borac Banja Luka	3–0	—N/a	10th
2024–25	UEFA Conference League	LP	(England) Chelsea	—N/a	1–5	10th
2024–25	UEFA Conference League	KPO	(Norway) Molde	0–1 (a.e.t.)	1–0	1–1 (4–5 p)
2025–26	UEFA Conference League	2Q	(Gibraltar) St Joseph's	0–0	4–0	4–0
2025–26	UEFA Conference League	3Q	(Kosovo) Ballkani	4–0	0–1	4–1
2025–26	UEFA Conference League	PO	(Portugal) Santa Clara	0–0	2–1	2–1
2025–26	UEFA Conference League	LP	(Czech Republic) Sparta Prague	—N/a	1–4	31st
2025–26	UEFA Conference League	LP	(Slovenia) Celje	0–2	—N/a	31st
2025–26	UEFA Conference League	LP	(Greece) AEK Athens	—N/a	1–1	31st
2025–26	UEFA Conference League	LP	(Ukraine) Shakhtar Donetsk	1–2	—N/a	31st
2025–26	UEFA Conference League	LP	(Iceland) Breiðablik	—N/a	1–3	31st
2025–26	UEFA Conference League	LP	(Malta) Hamrun Spartans	3–1	—N/a	31st
2026–27	UEFA Champions League	1Q	(Malta) Floriana	5–1	0–2	5–3
2026–27	UEFA Champions League	2Q	Ararat-Armenia	2–1	0–2	2–3
2026–27	UEFA Europa League	3Q	(Albania) Egnatia	3–1	1–5	4–6
2026–27	UEFA Conference League	PO	(Finland) KuPS	1–1	0–1	1–2

Notes

- PR: Preliminary round
- QR: Qualifying round
- 1R: First round
- 2R: Second round
- 1Q: First qualifying round
- 2Q: Second qualifying round
- 3Q: Third qualifying round
- PO: Play-off round
- LP: League phase
- KPO: Knockout phase play-off round

==== UEFA Club Ranking ====
As of 8 November 2024

Rank	Team	Points
106	(Sweden) Malmö FF	13.500
107	(France) Brest	13.000
108	(Republic of Ireland) Shamrock Rovers	13.000
109	(Slovenia) Olimpija Ljubljana	13.000
110	(Turkey) Beşiktaş	13.000

== Bibliography ==
- Paul Doolan, Robert Goggins (1993). The Hoops. Gill & MacmillanLtd. ISBN 0-7171-2121-6.
- Rice, Eoghan (2005). We Are Rovers. Nonsuch. ISBN 1-84588-510-4.
