= List of Derry City F.C. players =

List of Derry City players.

== Club captains ==
Dates	Name	Notes
1996-2009	Peter Hutton	
2010-2014	Kevin Deery	
2014	Cliff Byrne	
2014-2015	Barry Molloy	
2015-2017	Ryan McBride	
2017-2018	Gerard Doherty	
2019-2020	Barry McNamee	
2020	Conor McCormack	
2021-2022	Eoin Toal	
2022-2024	Patrick McEleney	
2025-	Mark Connolly	

== Notable former players ==
- (Republic of Ireland) Mark Farren
- (England) Neil Bennett
- (England) Luther Blissett
- (Northern Ireland) Gerry Bowler
- (Republic of Ireland) Kevin Brady
- (Republic of Ireland) Killian Brennan
- (Northern Ireland) Bobby Browne
- (Northern Ireland) Seamus Browne
- (Republic of Ireland) David Byrne
- (Northern Ireland) David Campbell
- (Northern Ireland) Johnny Campbell
- (Northern Ireland) Paul Carlyle
- (Republic of Ireland) Brian Cash
- (Spain) Cristian Castells
- (South Africa) Harris Chueu
- (Republic of Ireland) John Coady
- (Northern Ireland) Terry Cochrane
- (Northern Ireland) Fay Coyle
- (Northern Ireland) Liam Coyle
- (Northern Ireland) Jobby Crossan
- (Northern Ireland) John Cunningham
- (Northern Ireland) Paul Curran
- (Northern Ireland) Sammy Curran
- (Republic of Ireland) Ronan Curtis
- (Republic of Ireland) Cliff Byrne
- (South Africa) Owen Da Gama
- (Republic of Ireland) Tim Dalton
- (Brazil) Nelson da Silva
- (Republic of Ireland) Clive Delaney
- (Scotland) Jimmy Delaney
- (Northern Ireland) Declan Devine
- (Northern Ireland) Eamon Doherty
- (Republic of Ireland) Ger Doherty
- (Northern Ireland) Matt Doherty Sr.
- (Republic of Ireland) Paul Doolin
- (Northern Ireland) Jimmy Elwood
- (Republic of Ireland) David Forde
- (Northern Ireland) Sean Friars
- (Northern Ireland) Jackie Fullerton
- (Scotland) Stuart Gauld
- (Republic of Ireland) Bobby Gilbert
- (Republic of Ireland) Alan Gough
- (Scotland) Stewart Greacen
- (Northern Ireland) Terry Harkin
- (Northern Ireland) Felix Healy
- (Republic of Ireland) Paul Hegarty
- (Republic of Ireland) Jackie Hennessy
- (Northern Ireland) Jimmy Hill
- (Northern Ireland) Shaun Holmes
- (England) Michael Holt
- (Northern Ireland) Victor Hunter
- (Northern Ireland) Bobby Irvine
- (Scotland) Jack Keay
- (Republic of Ireland) David Kelly
- (Republic of Ireland) Jimmy Kelly
- (Northern Ireland) Terry Kelly
- (Republic of Ireland) Noel King
- (Scotland) Paul Kinnaird
- (Socialist Federal Republic of Yugoslavia) Alex Krstić
- (Republic of Ireland) Noel Larkin
- (England) Glen Little
- (Scotland) John Paul McBride
- (Republic of Ireland) Neil McCafferty
- (Northern Ireland) Mark McChrystal
- (Republic of Ireland) James McClean
- (Northern Ireland) Paddy McCourt
- (Northern Ireland) Billy McCullough
- (Northern Ireland) Gerry McElhinney
- (Scotland) Scott McGarvey
- (Northern Ireland) Jimmy McGeough
- (Scotland) Jon-Paul McGovern
- (Northern Ireland) Niall McGinn
- (Republic of Ireland) Gareth McGlynn
- (Scotland) Johnny MacKenzie
- (Northern Ireland) Jim McLaughlin
- (Scotland) Paul McLaughlin
- (Scotland) Archie McLeod
- (Scotland) Neil McNab
- (England) Lee Molyneux
- (Northern Ireland) Owen Morrison
- (Zaire) Jose Mukendi
- (England) Alex Nesovic
- (Northern Ireland) Ryan McBride
- (Republic of Ireland) Mick Neville
- (Northern Ireland) Tony O'Doherty
- (Republic of Ireland) Stephen O'Flynn
- (Northern Ireland) Liam O'Kane
- (Republic of Ireland) Ken Oman
- (United States) Russell Payne
- (Australia) Andy Petterson
- (Trinidad and Tobago) Derek Phillips
- (England) Calvin Plummer
- (Northern Ireland) Paul Ramsey
- (Northern Ireland) Eddie Reynolds
- (Scotland) Paul Ritchie
- (Northern Ireland) S.R. Russell
- (Austria) Lukas Schubert
- (Northern Ireland) Ryan Semple
- (Spain) Aaron Splaine
- (Northern Ireland) Jonathan Speak
- (Scotland) Mark Stewart
- (Republic of Ireland) Ben O'Sullivan
- (England) Alan Sunderland
- (England) Ernie Taylor
- (England) Dennis Tueart
- (Scotland) Gary Twigg
- (France) Pascal Vaudequin
- (Denmark) Niclas Vemmelund
- (England) Danny Ventre
- (England) Steve Williams
- (Libya) Eamon Zayed

== Reserve and youth squads ==
Derry City currently has academy teams at u13, u15, u17 and u19 age groups as well as an under-21 reserve team who play in the Ulster Senior League. These teams have also competed in international youth tournaments, including the Foyle Cup and the Umbro Galway Cup. In 2006, the academy team was victorious in the Umbro Galway Cup. Although many youth players come from the local youth league, the Derry and District League, Derry have branched out their scouting network and have since promoted players from all around Ireland.

Derry's under-21 side finished 3rd in the 2006 Dr. Tony O'Neill League Northern Section and therefore qualified for the knock-out stages, contested between qualifiers from the four provincial sections. In the second round, the side met Shelbourne F.C.'s under-21 team and knocked them out, winning 3-1. However, the side was then beaten in the quarter-final by the under-21 team of Sligo Rovers F.C.

== Record appearances in the League of Ireland ==
Rank	Player	Total appearances
1	Peter Hutton	678
2	Paul Curran	518
3	Sean Hargan	415
4	Gary Beckett	395
5	Liam Coyle	390

== Senior international players to have played for Derry City ==
Northern Ireland/Ireland:

Name	Caps	Goals
Niall McGinn	50	3
Terry Cochrane	26	1
Billy Gillespie	25	13
Jobby Crossan	24	10
Shane Ferguson	22	1
Liam O'Kane	20	0
Paddy McCourt	18	2
Bobby Irvine	15	3
Paul Ramsey	14	0
Daniel Lafferty	13	0
Jim McLaughlin	12	6
Jimmy Kelly	11	4
David Campbell	10	0
Billy McCullough	10	0
Jimmy Hill	7	0
Bobby Browne	6	0
Gerry McElhinney	6	0
Terry Harkin	5	2
Rory Patterson	5	1
Sammy Curran	4	2
Fay Coyle	4	0
Felix Healy	4	0
Gerry Bowler	3	0
S.R. Russell	3	0
Johnny Campbell	2	0
Jimmy Elwood	2	0
Victor Hunter	2	0
Tony O'Doherty	2	0
Liam Coyle	1	0
Matt Doherty	1	0
Shaun Holmes	1	0

Republic of Ireland/Ireland (Irish Free State):

Name	Caps	Goals
James McClean	47	8
David Kelly	26	9
David Forde	24	0
Conor Sammon	9	0
Alan Moore	8	0
Jackie Hennessy	5	0
Jimmy Kelly	4	0
Bobby Gilbert	1	0

England:

Name	Caps	Goals
Luther Blissett	14	3
Dennis Tueart	6	2
Steve Williams	6	0
Alan Sunderland	1	0

Scotland:

Name	Caps	Goals
Jimmy Delaney	15	6
Johnny MacKenzie	9	0

Libya:

Name	Caps	Goals
Éamon Zayed	8	1

Trinidad and Tobago:

Name	Caps	Goals
Derek Phillips	6	0

Zaire:

Name	Caps	Goals
Jose Mukendi	?	?
