= Derry City F.C. records =

This article deals with Derry City Football Club records.

== Honours ==
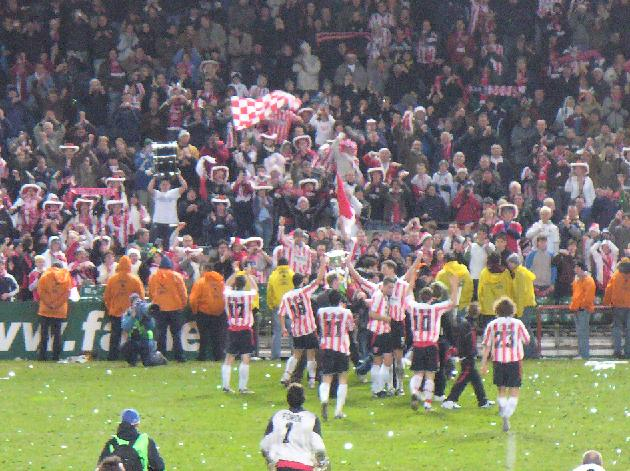
Derry City celebrate winning the 2006 FAI Cup.

- League titles: 5
  - Irish Football League: 1964-65
  - League of Ireland: 1988–89, 1996–97
  - League of Ireland First Division: 1986–87, 2010
- FAI Cup: 6
  - 1989, 1995, 2002, 2006, 2012, 2022
- League of Ireland Cup: 11
  - 1988-89, 1990–91, 1991–92, 1993–94, 1999–2000, 2005, 2006, 2007, 2008, 2011, 2018
- IFA Cup: 3
  - 1948–49, 1953–54, 1963–64
- League of Ireland First Division Shield: 1
  - 1985–86
- City Cup: 2
  - 1935, 1937
- Gold Cup: 1
  - 1964
- Top Four Winners: 1
  - 1966
- North-West Senior Cup: 14
  - 1931–32, 1932–33, 1933–34, 1934–35, 1936–37, 1938–39, 1953–54, 1959–60, 1961–62, 1962–63, 1963–64, 1965–66, 1968–69, 1970–71

== Domestic football ==
See 2019 League of Ireland for a general overview of Derry City's current season.

Derry compete in a number of major domestic competitions on an annual basis. Those include the League of Ireland, the FAI Cup and the League of Ireland Cup. They can also take part in the cross-border Setanta Sports Cup, on condition of qualification for the tournament based on performances in the three former competitions. Prior to 1973 the club's main domestic competitions were the Irish League and the IFA Cup.

=== League of Ireland ===
Up until the end of the 2006 season, Derry had played a total of 691 League of Ireland games since joining in 1985. 306 of these games had been won (44.28%), 197 had been drawn (28.51%) and 188 had been lost (27.21%). In the process, 951 goals were scored (an average of 1.38 goals per game) and 651 were conceded (an average of 0.94 goals per game). With 993 points being accumulated over those League of Ireland years, Derry managed an average of 1.44 points per game.

A graphical representation of Derry City's historical standings in the League of Ireland. The colored bars represent the two tiers of Irish football – the red bar being the Premier Division and the black bar being the First Division.

| Champions | Runners-up | Third place | Promoted | Relegated |

| Season | Pos. | P | W | D | L | F | A | Pts |
|---|---|---|---|---|---|---|---|---|
| 2012 | 5th | 30 | 11 | 6 | 13 | 36 | 36 | 39 |
| 2011^{2} | 3rd | 36 | 18 | 14 | 4 | 63 | 23 | 68 |
| 2010^{9} | 1st | 33 | 20 | 9 | 4 | 65 | 24 | 69 |
| 2009^{9} | 4th | 36 | 18 | 5 | 13 | 49 | 31 | 59 |
| 2008 | 2nd | 33 | 16 | 10 | 7 | 46 | 25 | 58 |
| 2007 | 7th | 33 | 8 | 13 | 12 | 30 | 31 | 37 |
| 2006^{2} | 2nd^{3} | 30 | 18 | 8 | 4 | 46 | 20 | 62 |
| 2005^{4} | 2nd | 33 | 22 | 6 | 5 | 56 | 25 | 72 |
| 2004 | 7th | 36 | 11 | 11 | 14 | 23 | 32 | 44 |
| 2003^{5} | 9th | 36 | 7 | 15 | 14 | 33 | 51 | 36 |
| 2002–03^{6} | 8th | 27 | 8 | 7 | 12 | 31 | 37 | 31 |
| 2001–02 | 5th | 33 | 14 | 9 | 10 | 42 | 30 | 51 |
| 2000–01 | 6th | 33 | 12 | 9 | 12 | 31 | 38 | 45 |
| 1999–00 | 7th | 33 | 12 | 10 | 11 | 32 | 38 | 46 |
| 1998–99 | 5th | 33 | 12 | 9 | 12 | 34 | 32 | 45 |
| 1997–98 | 9th | 33 | 10 | 10 | 13 | 30 | 31 | 40 |
| 1996–97 | 1st | 33 | 19 | 10 | 4 | 58 | 27 | 67 |
| 1995–96 | 6th | 33 | 11 | 13 | 9 | 50 | 38 | 46 |
| 1994–95 | 2nd | 33 | 16 | 10 | 7 | 45 | 30 | 58 |
| 1993–94^{7} | 4th | 32 | 12 | 10 | 10 | 37 | 35 | 46 |
| 1992–93^{8} | 5th | 32 | 11 | 15 | 6 | 26 | 23 | 37 |
| 1991–92 | 2nd | 33 | 17 | 10 | 6 | 49 | 21 | 44 |
| 1990–91 | 7th | 33 | 13 | 9 | 11 | 51 | 28 | 35 |
| 1989–90 | 2nd | 33 | 20 | 9 | 4 | 72 | 18 | 49 |
| 1988–89 | 1st | 34 | 25 | 5 | 4 | 70 | 21 | 53 |
| 1987–88 | 8th | 33 | 13 | 5 | 15 | 59 | 44 | 31 |
| 1986–87^{9} | 1st | 18 | 16 | 1 | 1 | 45 | 14 | 33 |
| 1985–86^{10} | 4th | 18 | 8 | 6 | 4 | 31 | 18 | 22 |

^1First season of the League of Ireland's 5 year merger with the FAI.
^2League reduced from 12 teams to 11 teams mid-season after Dublin City FC resigned so all their games were expunged from the record and the league table re-calculated. This also occurred in 2012 when Monaghan United withdrew from the league.
^3On goal difference.
^4League increased from 10 competing teams to 12 competing teams from start of this season onward (until 2009 when Premier Division will be reduced to 10 teams, as planned by FAI).
^5League changed to 'Summer season' from start of this season onward.
^6League reduced from 12 competing teams to 10 competing teams from outset of season. Lasted for 3 further seasons until end of 2004 season.
^7Changed from two points to three for a win from start of this season onward.
^8Top and bottom halves of league split into two groups of 6 teams for two concluding relegation and title mini-series. Concept lasted for two seasons.
^9Promoted from First Division to Premier Division after finishing top of division and remained there until they were expelled from the league at the end of the 2009 season, where they re-entered the first division and won it at the first attempt.
^10Season Derry City first entered First Division. Division made up of 10 teams for all of Derry's period of taking part.

- (Complete list of Premier Division standings)
- (Complete list of First Division standings)

=== FAI Cup ===
Derry City have appeared in the FAI Cup final on 10 occasions, winning 5 of those.

| Season | Winner | Score | Runner-up |
|---|---|---|---|
| 1987–88 | Dundalk | 1–0 | Derry City |
| 1988–89 | Derry City | 0-0, 1-0^{11} | Cork City |
| 1993–94 | Sligo Rovers | 1–0 | Derry City |
| 1994–95 | Derry City | 2–1 | Shelbourne |
| 1996–97 | Shelbourne | 2–0 | Derry City FC |
| 2002^{12} | Derry City | 1–0 | Shamrock Rovers |
| 2006 | Derry City | 4–3^{13} | St. Patrick's Athletic |
| 2008 | Bohemians | 2-2 4-2^{14} | Derry City |
| 2012 | Derry City | 3–2^{13} | St. Patrick's Athletic |
| 2014 | Derry City | 0–2 | St. Patrick's Athletic |

^11 After replay.
^12 This was second FAI Cup final in 2002 due to a 'Winter transition season' being played to allow for the new 'Summer season' to proceed in March 2003.
^13 After extra-time.
^14 Bohemians won on penalties.

- (Complete record)

=== League of Ireland Cup ===
Derry City have appeared in the League of Ireland Cup final on 12 occasions, winning 10 of those.

| Season | Winner | Score | Runner-up |
|---|---|---|---|
| 1988–89 | Derry City | 4–0 | Dundalk |
| 1989–90 | Dundalk^{15} | 1–1 | Derry City |
| 1990–91 | Derry City | 2–0 | Limerick |
| 1991–92 | Derry City | 1–0 | Bohemians |
| 1993–94 | Derry City | 1–0^{16} | Shelbourne |
| 1999–00 | Derry City | 5–2^{16} | Athlone Town |
| 2001–02 | Limerick | 2–2 ^{16} ^{17} | Derry City |
| 2005 | Derry City | 2–1 | UCD |
| 2006 | Derry City^{18} | 0–0 | Shelbourne |
| 2007 | Derry City^{19} | 1–0 | Bohemians |
| 2008 | Derry City | 6–1 | Wexford Youths |
| 2011 | Derry City | 1–0 | Cork City |
| 2018 | Derry City | 3–1 | Cobh Ramblers |

^15 Dundalk won on penalties.
^16 Aggregate score after two legs.
^17 Limerick won on penalties.
^18 Derry City won on penalties.
^{19} Derry City scored in extra time.

=== IFA Cup ===
Derry City have appeared in the IFA Cup final on 6 occasions, winning 3 of those.

| Season | Winner | Score | Runner-up |
|---|---|---|---|
| 1935–36 | Linfield | 0-0, 2-1^{20} | Derry City |
| 1948–49 | Derry City | 1–0 | Glentoran |
| 1953–54 | Derry City | 2-2, 0-0, 1-0^{21} | Glentoran |
| 1956–57 | Glenavon | 2–0 | Derry City |
| 1963–64 | Derry City | 2–0 | Glentoran |
| 1970–71 | Lisburn Distillery | 3–0 | Derry City |

^20 After replay and extra-time.
^21 After two replays.

=== Setanta Cup ===
Derry City appeared in the cross-border Setanta Cup final once in a losing effort.

| Season | Winner | Score | Runner-up |
|---|---|---|---|
| 2012 | Crusaders | 2-2 5-4^{22} | Derry City |

^22 Crusaders won on penalties.

== European record ==
=== Overview ===
| Competition | Matches | W | D | L | GF | GA |
|---|---|---|---|---|---|---|
| European Cup / UEFA Champions League | 9 | 1 | 1 | 7 | 9 | 26 |
| UEFA Cup / UEFA Europa League | 26 | 7 | 5 | 14 | 30 | 45 |
| UEFA Europa Conference League / UEFA Conference League | 10 | 4 | 2 | 4 | 9 | 12 |
| European Cup Winners' Cup / UEFA Cup Winners' Cup | 6 | 1 | 1 | 4 | 1 | 11 |
| TOTAL | 51 | 13 | 9 | 29 | 49 | 94 |

=== Matches ===
| Season | Competition | Round | Opponent | Home | Away | Aggregate |
|---|---|---|---|---|---|---|
| 1964–65 | European Cup Winners' Cup | 1R | (Romania) Steaua București | 0–2 | 0–3 | 0–5 |
| 1965–66 | European Cup | PR | (Norway) Lyn Oslo | 3–5 | 5–1 | 8–6 |
| 1965–66 | European Cup | 1R | (Belgium) Anderlecht | w/o | 0–9 | 0–9 |
| 1988–89 | European Cup Winners' Cup | 1R | (Wales) Cardiff City | 0–0 | 0–4 | 0–4 |
| 1989–90 | European Cup | 1R | (Portugal) Benfica | 1–2 | 0–4 | 1–6 |
| 1990–91 | UEFA Cup | 1R | (Netherlands) Vitesse | 0–1 | 0–0 | 0–1 |
| 1992–93 | UEFA Cup | 1R | (Netherlands) Vitesse | 0–3 | 1–2 | 1–5 |
| 1995–96 | UEFA Cup Winners' Cup | 1R | (Bulgaria) Lokomotiv Sofia | 1–0 | 0–2 | 1–2 |
| 1997–98 | UEFA Champions League | 1QR | (Slovenia) Maribor | 0–2 | 0–1 | 0–3 |
| 2003–04 | UEFA Cup | QR | (Cyprus) APOEL | 0–3 | 1–2 | 1–5 |
| 2006–07 | UEFA Cup | 1QR | (Sweden) IFK Göteborg | 1–0 | 1–0 | 2–0 |
| 2006–07 | UEFA Cup | 2QR | (Scotland) Gretna | 2–2 | 5–1 | 7–3 |
| 2006–07 | UEFA Cup | 1R | (France) Paris Saint-Germain | 0–0 | 0–2 | 0–2 |
| 2007–08 | UEFA Champions League | 1QR | (Armenia) Pyunik | 0–0 | 0–2 | 0–2 |
| 2009–10 | UEFA Europa League | 2QR | (Latvia) Skonto | 1–0 | 1–1 | 2–1 |
| 2009–10 | UEFA Europa League | 3QR | (Bulgaria) CSKA Sofia | 1–1 | 0–1 | 1–2 |
| 2013–14 | UEFA Europa League | 2QR | (Turkey) Trabzonspor | 0–3 | 2–4 | 2–7 |
| 2014–15 | UEFA Europa League | 1QR | (Wales) Aberystwyth Town | 4–0 | 5–0 | 9–0 |
| 2014–15 | UEFA Europa League | 2QR | (Belarus) Shakhtyor Soligorsk | 0–1 | 1–5 | 1–6 |
| 2017–18 | UEFA Europa League | 1QR | (Denmark) Midtjylland | 1–4 | 1–6 | 2–10 |
| 2018–19 | UEFA Europa League | 1QR | (Belarus) Dinamo Minsk | 0–2 | 2–1 | 2–3 |
| 2020–21 | UEFA Europa League | 1QR | (Lithuania) Riteriai | N/A | 2–3 | N/A |
| 2022–23 | UEFA Europa Conference League | 1QR | (Latvia) Riga FC | 0–2 | 0–2 | 0–4 |
| 2023–24 | UEFA Europa Conference League | 1QR | (Faroe Islands) HB Torshavn | 1–0 | 0–0 | 1–0 |
| 2023–24 | UEFA Europa Conference League | 2QR | (Finland) KuPS | 2–1 | 3–3 | 5–4 |
| 2023–24 | UEFA Europa Conference League | 3QR | (Kazakhstan) Tobol Kostanay | 1-0 | 0–1 | 1–1 (5–6 p) |
| 2024–25 | UEFA Conference League | 1QR | (Gibraltar) Bruno's Magpies | 2–1 | 0–2 | 2–3 |

- (Full details)

=== UEFA coefficient and ranking ===
Derry City's UEFA coefficient accumulates to a total value of 3.500 as of July 2023.

Current club ranking

- 307 (Romania) Viitorul Constanta
- 308 (Cyprus) AEL Limassol
- 309 (Georgia (country)) Dila Gori
- 310 (Republic of Ireland) Derry City FC
- 311 (Luxembourg) FC Differdange 03
- 312 (Armenia) Urartu FC
- 313 (Slovenia) NK Celje

https://kassiesa.net/uefa/data/method5/trank2024.html

== Player records ==
=== Record appearances in the League of Ireland ===
| Rank | Player | Total appearances |
|---|---|---|
| 1 | Peter Hutton | 670 |
| 2 | Paul Curran | 518 |
| 3 | Sean Hargan | 408 |
| 4 | Gary Beckett | 395 |
| 5 | Liam Coyle | 390 |

=== Senior international players to have played for Derry City ===
Northern Ireland/Ireland:

| Name | Caps | Goals |
|---|---|---|
| Niall McGinn | 50 | 3 |
| Terry Cochrane | 26 | 1 |
| Billy Gillespie | 25 | 13 |
| Jobby Crossan | 24 | 10 |
| Shane Ferguson | 22 | 1 |
| Liam O'Kane | 20 | 0 |
| Paddy McCourt | 18 | 2 |
| Bobby Irvine | 15 | 3 |
| Paul Ramsey | 14 | 0 |
| Daniel Lafferty | 13 | 0 |
| Jim McLaughlin | 12 | 6 |
| Jimmy Kelly | 11 | 4 |
| David Campbell | 10 | 0 |
| Billy McCullough | 10 | 0 |
| Jimmy Hill | 7 | 0 |
| Bobby Browne | 6 | 0 |
| Gerry McElhinney | 6 | 0 |
| Terry Harkin | 5 | 2 |
| Rory Patterson | 5 | 1 |
| Sammy Curran | 4 | 2 |
| Fay Coyle | 4 | 0 |
| Felix Healy | 4 | 0 |
| Gerry Bowler | 3 | 0 |
| S.R. Russell | 3 | 0 |
| Johnny Campbell | 2 | 0 |
| Jimmy Elwood | 2 | 0 |
| Victor Hunter | 2 | 0 |
| Tony O'Doherty | 2 | 0 |
| Liam Coyle | 1 | 0 |
| Matt Doherty | 1 | 0 |
| Shaun Holmes | 1 | 0 |

Republic of Ireland/Ireland (Irish Free State):

| Name | Caps | Goals |
|---|---|---|
| James McClean | 100 | 8 |
| David Kelly | 26 | 9 |
| David Forde | 24 | 0 |
| Conor Sammon | 9 | 0 |
| Alan Moore | 8 | 0 |
| Jackie Hennessy | 5 | 0 |
| Jimmy Kelly | 4 | 0 |
| Bobby Gilbert | 1 | 0 |

England:

| Name | Caps | Goals |
|---|---|---|
| Luther Blissett | 14 | 3 |
| Dennis Tueart | 6 | 2 |
| Steve Williams | 6 | 0 |
| Alan Sunderland | 1 | 0 |

Scotland:

| Name | Caps | Goals |
|---|---|---|
| Jimmy Delaney | 15 | 6 |
| Johnny MacKenzie | 9 | 0 |

Libya:

| Name | Caps | Goals |
|---|---|---|
| Éamon Zayed | 8 | 1 |

Trinidad and Tobago:

| Name | Caps | Goals |
|---|---|---|
| Derek Phillips | 6 | 0 |

Zaire:

| Name | Caps | Goals |
|---|---|---|
| Jose Mukendi | ? | ? |

== Competitive managerial records in the League of Ireland ==
| Name | Nationality | From | To | Record | | | | | | |
| Name | Nationality | From | To | Played | Won | Drawn | Lost | Goals for | Goals against | Win percentage |
|---|---|---|---|---|---|---|---|---|---|---|
| Jim Crossan | (Northern Ireland) | 1985 | 1985 | 10 | 2 | 4 | 4 | 9 | 13 | 20% |
| Noel King^{20} | (Republic of Ireland) | 1985 | 1987 | 62 | 43 | 7 | 12 | 144 | 57 | 69% |
| Jim McLaughlin | (Northern Ireland) | 1987 | 1991 | 177 | 97 | 41 | 39 | 347 | 141 | 55% |
| Roy Coyle | (Northern Ireland) | 1991 | 1993 | 97 | 44 | 32 | 21 | 115 | 71 | 45% |
| Tony O'Doherty | (Northern Ireland) | 1993 | 1994 | 56 | 29 | 14 | 13 | 76 | 52 | 52% |
| Felix Healy | (Northern Ireland) | 1994 | 1998 | 171 | 73 | 53 | 45 | 262 | 169 | 43% |
| Kevin Mahon | (Republic of Ireland) | 1998 | 2003 | 200 | 82 | 51 | 67 | 225 | 213 | 41% |
| Dermot Keely | (Republic of Ireland) | 2003 | 2003 | 11 | 1 | 6 | 4 | 9 | 18 | 9% |
| Gavin Dykes | (Republic of Ireland) | 2003 | 2004 | 34 | 8 | 13 | 13 | 23 | 30 | 24% |
| Peter Hutton^{24} | (Northern Ireland) | 2004 | 2004 | 12 | 6 | 3 | 3 | 10 | 10 | 50% |
| Stephen Kenny | (Republic of Ireland) | 2004 | 2006 | 112^{25} | 65 | 29 | 18 | 170 | 80 | 58% |
| Pat Fenlon | (Republic of Ireland) | 2006 | 2007 | 18 | 6 | 5 | 7 | 16 | 18 | 33% |
| Peter Hutton^{24} | (Northern Ireland) | 2007 | 2007 | 6 | 1 | 3 | 2 | 7 | 5 | 17% |
| John Robertson | (Scotland) | 2007 | 2007 | 2 | 2 | 0 | 0 | 6 | 2 | 100% |
| Stephen Kenny | (Republic of Ireland) | 2007 | 2011 | 181 | 93 | 49 | 39 | - | - | 58% |

^24 Acted as player-manager.
^25 Record includes two games – a win and a loss – against Dublin City which were expunged from the records after being contested.

== Other records ==
- Derry City's first ever goalscorer was Peter Burke against Glentoran on 22 August 1929.
- On 24 August 1929, Sammy Curran had the honour of scoring Derry City's first senior hat-trick, as the club came back from 5–1 down against Portadown FC, only to lose 6–5 to a late goal.
- The club's all-time highest goal-scorer is Jimmy Kelly with 363 goals during a spell of over 20 years at the club between 1930 and the early 1951.
- Terry Kelly, who captained Derry City in 1985, was the first football player in the world to captain a club he played with in two different national leagues.
- Barry McCreadie was Derry's first goalscorer in the League of Ireland. He scored during a 3–1 home win over Home Farm on 8 September 1985.
- Derry City's first hat-trick in the League of Ireland was scored by Kevin Mahon away at Finn Harps on 15 December 1985.
- Derry City's record league defeat was to Shamrock Rovers in March, 2018. The score was 6–1.
- Derry City's record league victory was a score of 9–1 against Galway United in October, 1989.
- The club's highest scorer in the League of Ireland is Mark Farren, who played for the club from 2003 until 2012. Farren scored 114 goals in 209 competitive appearances for the club.
- Derry City completed a treble in the League of Ireland 1988–89 season. Shamrock Rovers are the only others to have completed this feat — three times in total.
- Derry are one of only three clubs (the others are Shelbourne and Bohemians) who have won both the Irish Cup and the FAI Cup.
- Derry are the only team in Ireland to have won both the Irish League and the League of Ireland.
- Derry played in the first League of Ireland match ever to be shown live on television when they visited Tolka Park to play Shelbourne FC during the 1996–97 season. The game was broadcast on RTÉ's Network 2 and finished 1–1 with Gary Beckett scoring for Derry.
- In 2005, Kevin McHugh became one of just a handful of current players to join the 38-strong group of players who have scored 100 or more League of Ireland goals in the modern era.
- Derry's 5–1 away win against Gretna FC at Fir Park, Motherwell in the 2006–07 UEFA Cup Second Qualifying Round is the largest away winning margin for any League of Ireland team in European competition.
- Derry's FAI Cup final game against St. Patrick's Athletic on 3 December 2006 was the last soccer game ever to be contested at the old Lansdowne Road stadium before the commencement of planned re-development. Derry won the wind-swept game 4-3 after extra-time.
- Derry City is a unique club, due to its troubled and fluctuant history, in that it is one of the few clubs from the United Kingdom (and the only club in Northern Ireland) to play in the league of another country – the league of the Republic of Ireland in the case of Derry City. (See Football clubs playing in the league of another country for further general information.)
- Derry City hold the record for the most League of Ireland Cup wins, having won the competition 11 times.
- In 2018 Jack Doyle scored the 1500th League of Ireland goal for the club in a 1–0 win over Waterford at the Brandywell
- Brian Maher has made the most consecutive league appearances for Derry City, playing in his 111th league match in succession on 9 May 2025.
