= History of Derry City F.C. =

This article covers the history of Derry City Football Club, from the club's early days in the Irish League, through the "wilderness years" and into the present day as the club competes in the League of Ireland. For season by season results see Seasons

== Foundation and the attaining of senior status (1913–29) ==
In 1913, eleven years after their creation, Derry Celtic were voted out of senior soccer in Ireland. This left the city of Derry without a senior team – a situation which was to last for some time. It was a period lengthened as a result of the First World War, the Easter Rising, and the partition of Ireland. The division of the country led to the creation of two football leagues when the clubs south of the border broke away from the Irish Football Association (IFA) and their Irish League to form the Football Association of the Irish Free State (FAIFS, later to become the FAI) and Free State League. With Derry being a part of Northern Ireland post-partition, any club in the city would have fallen under the jurisdiction of the Irish Football Association. The people of Derry were irate that a city of its size did not have a senior team, especially when near-neighbours Coleraine, with only a quarter the population of Derry, had been elected to the Irish League in the mid-twenties.

In 1928, a group of football fans got together to rectify this situation and decided that the name of Derry Celtic would not satisfy their cross-community, non-sectarian requirements so they settled on the name Derry City. At the time, the dispute over the city's official name had not yet become as politicised as it would in later years. On 9 May 1928, Derry City affiliated to the North-West Football Association and, in a link with the past, Norman McClure son of a Derry Celtic director, was appointed the club's secretary. On 25 May 1928, William Arthur led a delegation to a meeting of the Irish Senior Leagues Committee (ISLC) to attempt to secure Derry's senior status.

Along with Crusaders F.C. and Brantwood F.C., Derry City's application was rejected. The Belfast clubs were not considered to be of senior quality, while Derry's application had been received two days after the deadline. The directors returned to Derry disappointed but determined. The next year saw them preparing for the inevitable move from amateur to senior status – their confidence buoyed by the fact that after they failed to apply by the requisite deadline, a motion at the ISLC to waive the deadline was only defeated by 17 votes to 15. The president of the IFA, Captain James Wilton, a Derry-man, announced on 30 May 1929 that he felt confident that Derry City would be admitted to the Irish League, which since 1922, had covered only Northern Ireland, the following night.

During the final of the local McAlinden Cup being played between Derry Celtic and Richmond in the Brandywell on Friday 31 May 1929, the announcement that Derry City had achieved senior status was greeted with a chorus of cheers and applause. Queen's Island were voted out at the expense of Derry. Joe McCleery, a native of the city, was enticed from his managerial post in Dundalk with Dundalk F.C. to become Derry's first manager and he quickly signed Fred Mason from his former club. The big Birmingham-born player settled well in the team and city, eventually establishing Mason's bar in Magazine Street after his playing career ended. Plans to purchase a pitch fell through due to the tight timescales and so the Londonderry Corporation was approached for the use of the Brandywell Stadium which had been used for football up until the end of the 19th century. This began an association between the club and the ground which has survived until the present day. The club are still operating under the constraints of the Honourable the Irish Society charter limitations which declare that the Brandywell must be available for the recreation of the community. In effect, the club do not have private ownership over the ground and, thus, cannot develop it by their own accord with that discretion left to the Derry City Council (formerly the Londonderry Corporation).

== The early years in the Irish League (1929–49) ==
Derry City's original colours

On 22 August 1929, Derry City ran on to the Brandywell turf for the first time in claret and blue shirts with white shorts. McCleery's full-time professionals led Glentoran F.C. by a score of 1–0 at half-time with a goal from Peter Burke – a recent recruit from the Free State Army. The attendance of 7,500 saw a Derry team captained by Con Hilley lose that lead in the second half and leave the pitch without any points after Glentoran's second-half brace. Their trip to Portadown resulted in Derry's first hat-trick in senior football through Sammy Curran, but they still managed to lose 6–5 in an enthralling game. Their first point in senior football came soon after a 1–1 draw in the Brandywell against Ballymena F.C; and a crowd of 12,000 saw Derry get their first cup-game win when they beat the dominant Linfield F.C. side 3–1 in the Gold Cup. On 7 September the Brandywell club gained their first league victory with a 3–2 win over Newry Town at the home of the County Down club. It was not until 5 October 1929 that the Brandywell faithful witnessed Derry's first league victory on home turf when Derry beat Cliftonville F.C. 4–3. They ended the season in an admirable fifth place, and came third in the City Cup.

However, it was not an easy start for the Foylesiders and it certainly was not going to be an easy ride at any stage in the Irish League. The following year, McCleery signed Derry's first legend. Jimmy Kelly, born in Ballybofey, schooled in the Derry and District FA, and polished in the Anfield training grounds, returned to Derry and played his first game on 26 October 1930 against Linfield at Windsor Park. It took him four matches to get on the scoresheet. That goal against Glenavon F.C. was the first of 363 for Derry City in a career spanning almost 21 years. During that time he was capped by the IFA, the FAIFS, the Irish League and the League of Ireland. His arrival though did not inspire Derry who ended the 1930–31 league campaign in seventh place.

The next season saw a brief upturn in their fortunes, which could very well have been directly related to Derry's signing of the club's second superstar. E.D.R. Shearer pulled on the Derry shirt for the first time at the Coleraine Showgrounds in a career spanning eight seasons with the club. With three games of the 1931–32 season remaining, Derry were top of the table, level with Glentoran, but managed to lose all three games and ended up in fourth place. It was gutting to end the season in such a way, especially as they had scored 107 goals. Rumours of McCleery's demise began to circulate. In June 1932, McCleery was sacked despite the fact he had just had his most successful season at the helm. The directors also decided to introduce Derry's second strip at the end of the season – white shirts and black shorts.

Colours worn by Derry City between 1932 and 1934

A County Donegal man, Billy Gillespie, was given the nod as McCleery's replacement after 20 years playing at Sheffield United. Gillespie did not have a great start and could only help the club to another fourth-place finish in 1933. This was the second year in which ground purchase was mentioned. The board decided against buying Bond's Field in the Waterside as it was thought to be too far away from the fan base which had built up on the Cityside, especially in the Brandywell area. They had first option on Derry Celtic's old ground, Celtic Park, but hesitated on a final decision and the Gaelic Athletic Association bought it ten years later. They also decided not to purchase Meenan Park for £1,500. In 1934 the club came ninth and so the dismissal of McCleery was looking worse by the season.

Derry City's now-traditional colours were introduced in 1934.

Shortly before the 1934–35 season, the directors decided on another change of strip. They decided on the red and white striped shirts and black shorts of Sheffield United as a tribute to Billy Gillespie who, despite his less-than-impressive managerial performance, was still an extremely popular figure throughout Ireland and especially the north-western region, due to his international performances for the Irish football team. This was to be the jersey that was to become synonymous with Derry City for the next seventy years, the only break being a period of wearing gold and black in the late 1950s. It was in the "candy-striped" top that Derry lifted their first major trophy. Having won the North-West Senior Cup in 1931–32, 1932–33, and 1933–34, they went a step further and in front of 9,000 at Brandywell – Hugh Carlyle lifted the old Dunville trophy for Derry City as winners of the City Cup by a clear 5 points over 12 games. Derry were to repeat this feat in 1937 but it was not until 12 years later that they were to lift another major trophy, having also lost an Irish Cup final replay to Linfield in 1936.

By 1947–48, the directors were seriously considering Derry's future as the club had entered a demise in the previous decade and were no longer as feared as they once were. However, luckily, then-manager Willie Ross took advantage of having found a considerable sum of money to spend after the sale of players Eddie Crossan and John Feeney resulted in an annual profit of £2,000 – a figure most Irish clubs would have jumped at in the days of red bank balances. This enabled the club to carry on and keep astute on the transfer market.

In 1949 the club won the Irish Cup for the first time. Derry were reduced to 10 men in the final at Windsor Park on 16 April 1949 when Jimmy Kelly was stretchered off. After the opponents, Glentoran, went in front, Hugh Colvan and Matt Doherty put Derry ahead. The team doctor cured Kelly's concussion and the 10,000 Derry supporters roared him back on to the field of play 15 minutes after he had been carried off. Barney Cannon's goal seven minutes from time meant that the 27,000 in attendance saw the Irish Cup going to Derry for the first time.

== The fair fifties and the swinging sixties (1949–65) ==
A few years of failure resulted in apathy within the city and by the time another legendary figure in the form of a past Scottish-international was signed in January 1954, memories of the 1949 silverware had gone. Even in 1954 the club came third from bottom, although the signing of Jimmy Delaney, formerly of Celtic and Manchester United, did provide a shining light. Derry's club doctor, Desmond Sidebottom had heard he wanted to settle in Ireland so Derry pounced and secured one of the greatest players ever to play on Irish soil. That year Derry met Glentoran, who were favourites just as they had been in 1949, once again in the Irish Cup final. The first final ended in a 2–2 draw; the replay was a scoreless draw; and the second replay in front of a crowd of 28,000 saw Derry win 1–0 with a Con O'Neill strike from a Delaney assist. At the final whistle the players rushed to celebrate with Delaney but the Scot ran the length of the field to celebrate with and thank Charlie Heffron in the Derry goal who had thwarted Glentoran's attacks time and time again. Together, the three finals saw 93,000 attend – a figure unimaginable in today's domestic Irish soccer.

Colours worn by the club for period between 1956 and 1962 before returning to the 'candystripes'.

In the late 50s Derry lost some of their more popular figures: Jobby Crossan left for Coleraine after he had turned down Nottingham Forest; Jim McLaughlin went to Birmingham City F.C.; and Matt Doherty Jr. moved to Glentoran. Meanwhile, the club brought in Fay Coyle from Coleraine as they reverted to part-time status with the 1961 abolishment of the maximum wage in football. In 1964 Derry City lifted the Gold Cup and the Irish Cup once again, after having beaten Glentoran in the final for a third time. Another club hero was signed on 30 June 1964 – Belfast-man, Jimmy McGeough, came to Derry from Stockport County. Matt Doherty Jr. returned and yet another star, Willie Curran, made his debut that season. Derry set off on an unbeaten run of 47 games that year that was to span two seasons. Steaua București beat Derry 5–0 on aggregate in the European Cup Winners Cup the following year but the club made up for the disappointment by becoming the Irish League champions for the only time in their history. In April 1965 a 5–1 victory over Ards in the Brandywell saw 34-goal captain, Fay Coyle, lift the league trophy in front of a packed Brandywell. Within weeks, Doug Wood was named 'Northern Ireland Player of the Year' and Derry performed admirably in a 3–1 friendly defeat to a Spanish 1966 World Cup preparation select in Madrid's Vicente Calderón Stadium. The Spanish team had invited Derry to Madrid as they were soon to face Ireland in the qualifying rounds for the competition scheduled to take place on English soil, so they were anxious to test themselves against a team that was likely to possess a similar style of play.

The following season, Derry became the first Irish League team to win a European tie over two legs by beating FK Lyn in the European Cup when, after losing 5–3 in the Oslo, they won 8–6 on aggregate. The return leg in the Brandywell had played in very bad weather. It had rained incessantly from the previous day, but that did not prevent a full house from watching Derry City win 5–1. The fans went home drenched but delighted. However, what they did not know was that there were forces at work who would deny Derry their night of glory. The second round was not to come to the Brandywell as the IFA prevented the use of the ground, using the excuse that the pitch was not up to standard, even though a game had been played there during the previous round. With sectarianism taking a foothold in Northern Ireland in the run-up to the advent of the Troubles, Derry suspected that such motives may have been at play, because Derry played in a mainly nationalist area and so had come to be supported mostly by Catholics, while the IFA represented a cultural focal point of Protestant Northern Ireland. Seeing a team from a mainly-nationalist city being the first Irish League club to progress was a bitter pill to swallow for Harry Cavan, the president of the IFA. Derry stated that they would stand their ground in the face of this and refuse to travel elsewhere to play the tie after requesting advice on how to make the ground suitable but receiving no answer. The ban was simply re-inforced. The IFA wanted their representatives to play the tie in Belfast, although, in what seemed like a case of double standards, they deemed the Showgrounds in mainly-Protestant Coleraine suitable also, despite the fact that the grounds were in much the same state as the Brandywell. After Derry had told the IFA that they would not play or represent the Irish League in Europe without a lifting of the ban, R.S.C. Anderlecht, the upcoming opponents, who had been prepared to play at the Brandywell, pleaded with Derry to play the tie and so Derry travelled to Belgium and were hammered 9–0. Even though Anderlecht officials visited Derry to analyse the Brandywell pitch and declared that their club would have no problem playing at the Brandywell for the return game, a second leg was never played, with the fixture being announced as a walkover due to the withdrawal of Derry. Playing the second leg would have been, more or less, a futile effort anyway with such a vast deficit to recover, while the IFA were not prepared to let the game go ahead in Derry regardless after having recommended to the European Football Union that the Brandywell Stadium be banned from hosting the game. Incidentally, the European Football Union had not objected to Derry City using the Brandywell for the game either and left the decision within the discretion of the IFA. Relations between Derry and the IFA never improved.

== Security concerns during the 'Troubles' (Late 1960s–1985) ==
Up until the late 1960s most teams' journey to the Brandywell would have been of little consequence. However, 1969 was the beginning of the Troubles. As the situation in Northern Ireland deteriorated, football matches between certain teams with nationalist and unionist support respectively began to echo the wider trouble of the time. City's ground, the Brandywell Stadium, was located in a republican area of Derry and the club was associated with the Catholic and nationalist community in the city. For a time, the area was beyond the reach of the police and Army.

During the late 1960s and early 1970s the locality surrounding the Brandywell saw some of the worst violence of the Troubles. The Brandywell first fell prey to this on 25 January 1969, when a match versus Linfield F.C. was marred by crowd trouble. Fans of the Belfast team had to be evacuated from the stadium by police at half-time after ugly scenes within the ground. The months that followed saw the general political situation decline into civil disorder at locations across Northern Ireland, including areas in the vicinity of the Brandywell. The stadium was located in the centre of one of the most unstable zones. Because of the disturbances, numerous clubs were reluctant to play matches there and some of Derry's home games were moved by the IFA who felt that the inability of the security force to police the games adequately was unacceptable. Linfield declared that they would no longer travel to the city for matches on security grounds, and for the next two seasons Derry were instead forced to play 'home' games against them at Linfield's Windsor Park. The game on 25 January was to be the last game played at the Brandywell between Linfield and Derry until 2005.

Despite the social and political turmoil of the day, on the field Derry still managed to perform as usual. Danny Hale finished the 1968–69 season as the Irish League's top scorer with a tally of 21 goals while the club also managed to make their way to the Irish Cup final in 1971, although they were beaten 3–0 by Distillery with Martin O'Neill scoring twice for the winners. However, events off the field took an even greater turn for the worse for Derry City in September 1971. With large chunks of the city a 'no-go area' for the security forces, a gang of youths hijacked the bus of a visiting team, Ballymena United, outside the Brandywell before a league game and burned it. As a result, most other Irish League teams joined Linfield in refusing to play fixtures at the Brandywell and the Royal Ulster Constabulary further consolidated this refusal by ruling that it was unsafe for matches to take place there.

As a result, Derry City were forced to travel to Coleraine, which was over 30 miles away, in order to play their 'home' games at the Showgrounds. They had initially inquired as to the availability of a ground in Limavady but permission was refused, while the IFA insisted that they could not make use of Finn Park in Ballybofey as it was in the Republic of Ireland. With no other major ground in the local area available, Coleraine was a last resort. This unsustainable situation lasted until October 1972 when, faced with dwindling crowds and dire finances, the club formally requested permission from the Irish League to return to the Brandywell. Portadown F.C. also entered a proposal to return to playing at the Brandywell. Despite an assessment by the security forces which concluded that the Brandywell was no more dangerous than any other ground in the league and the resulting lifting of the imposed ban, City's proposal fell by a single vote at the hands of their fellow Irish League teams who remained unwilling to travel there. Portadown, Bangor, Cliftonville, Ballymena United, and Derry City voted in favour of the motion while Crusaders, Ards, Glenavon, Glentoran, Distillery, and Linfield all voted against. Coleraine abstained and so with a majority of one vote. Derry, devastated by the outcome, withdrew from senior football the next day.

The club lived on as a junior team during a period that became known as the "wilderness years", plying their trade in the local Saturday Morning League to survive, whilst simultaneously seeking re-admission to the Irish League on a number of occasions over the following 13 years. Each time, the club nominated the Brandywell as its chosen home ground. Each time, the Irish League refused to re-admit them, despite significant improvements in the overall security situation over the years. Derry then decided to turn their attentions elsewhere in spite of their affiliation to the Irish Football Association by jurisdiction.

== Admission into the League of Ireland, instant progress and ensuing success (1985–present) ==
Having formerly played in the Irish Football League which, since 1922, covers only Northern Ireland and with the club's almost annual applications to re-join that league being rejected season after season, Derry applied to join the rejuvenated League of Ireland (the Republic of Ireland's football league at the time) in 1985 with the Brandywell Stadium as their home ground. People such as Terry Harkin, Tony O'Doherty, Eamon McLaughlin and Eddie Mahon, having worked on the visionary project since 1983, helped in the bid to secure senior status once again for Derry City with an election to the League of Ireland's First Division in May 1985. However, the IFA still saw the chance to thwart Derry City once again. The FIFA vice-president (also the IFA's president), Harry Cavan, who had been instrumental in banning the Brandywell from being used for European competition in 1964, claimed that FIFA rules did not permit Derry crossing the border to play in the league of another country. In reality, Cavan and other IFA loyalists were worried about the prospect of other Northern Irish clubs would seek to play in the League of Ireland, and in particular they feared the prospect of supporters of defunct Belfast Celtic seeking to revive their club and apply for admission south of the border.

While some people in the Republic were uneasy about admitting a club from a city with a recent history of political problems, Finn Harps chairman Fran Fields fully backed Derry's application. The Glentoran chairman, John Crossen, was another prominent supporter of Derry's move as he felt that the time had come for the IFA to refrain from acting as they had done previously. Others within the Irish League were also in favour of Derry's move, or at least indifferent to it, as they no longer wanted to have to deal with the club's annual application for re-election to the Irish League.

The Irish League and the League of Ireland met in Dundalk in August 1984 and agreed to talk again. This meeting came shortly after Derry hosted Shamrock Rovers in the Brandywell friendly in front of 4,000 fans. Eventually the IFA relented but, knowing that other clubs would want to follow Derry south of the border, they made it clear that they would give permission only to Derry City Football Club to apply to join the League of Ireland.

After another successful series of friendlies against Irish teams, Dundalk FC and St. Patrick's Athletic, Derry were informed that they would be accepted into the newly formed First Division, on the provision that the Irish League did not object, and FIFA would sanction such a move. The IFA eventually stated they would not stand in the way if FIFA gave the go-ahead. Neither FIFA nor their subordinate European organisation, UEFA, objected and gave the Derry club special permission to play in the League of Ireland. With no further hurdles standing in the way, Derry City joined the Republic's league, the League of Ireland, in the newly created League of Ireland First Division in 1985 as a semi-professional outfit (although they did adopt professional football while Noel King was in charge between late-1985 and 1987). However, if they thought that this would provide an escape from the marginalisation and sectarian politics in Northern Irish football, they would have to think again – Derry's supporters' buses often came under attack from sectarian gangs with stones and other missiles as they travelled through loyalist areas en route to away games in the Republic of Ireland. On occasion, buses still take a detour in order to avoid potential trouble-spots – especially on the days of high-profile games. Nevertheless, the city responded in their thousands. Jim Crossan had been appointed manager and he made Terry Kelly his team-captain. Derry's first match in the League of Ireland was played at the Brandywell on 8 September 1985 and saw Derry beat Home Farm of Dublin by a score of 3–1. The game itself was actually played as part of the League Cup. Barry McCreadie was Derry's first goal-scorer that day. The club's first League of Ireland hat-trick came when Kevin Mahon fired three past Finn Harps at Finn Park on 15 December 1985. Jim Crossan did not remain in charge of the team for long, however, and his quick departure by the end of 1985 allowed new manager Noel King to bring worldly flair to the Brandywell in the form of the Brazilian, Nelson da Silva, and South African, Owen Da Gama. A throwback to Derry's Irish League days saw Declan McDowell solidify the defence while Kevin Mahon worked wonders on the wing. With another local favourite, Tony O'Doherty, in midfield, the club went on to clinch the League of Ireland First Division Shield in their first season of football in the Republic of Ireland with a 6–1 aggregate victory over Longford Town FC. The following season, Derry left Shelbourne F.C. in their wake as they won the First Division and promotion to the Premier Division in 1987. Alex Krstic, with his 18 goals, ended the season as the First Division's top scorer. The 1987–88 season, Derry's first in the League of Ireland Premier Division, saw Jonathan Speak finish top of the scoring chart with 24 goals to his name.

Derry's accession to the League of Ireland was greeted with great enthusiasm in the city and the club attracted huge crowds by local standards for several years. The recruitment of a number of high-profile, exotic players from abroad, such as Nelson da Silva, Owen Da Gama, Dennis Tueart and Luther Blissett, also attracted large crowds to the games. Buoyed by this support and motivated by hunger after an FAI Cup final defeat in 1988 to Dundalk, the most successful manager in the history of the League of Ireland, Derry-born Jim McLaughlin, helped the club to a historic treble – the League Cup, the League Title and the FAI Cup – in the 1988–89 season. Subsequently, Derry qualified for European competition and past European Cup winners, Benfica, came to play at the Brandywell in the following season's First Round of the European Cup. The game evoked great public interest and only helped publicise the club further.

Since then, Derry have only won the League championship once in 1996–97, but have been runners-up on several occasions – in the 1994–95, 2005 and 2006 seasons. They also added three more FAI Cups to their trophy-tally in 1995, 2002 and 2006. In 1994 and 1997 they were runners-up in the FAI Cup. The League of Ireland Cup competition has also brought Derry much success – they won the trophy in 1991, 1992, 1994, 2000, 2005 and 2006, as well as in the 1989 treble-winning season. To add to this, Derry once memorably beat Celtic by a score of 3–2 at Lansdowne Road during the Irish International Club Tournament, which took place in 1997, and made their Sky Sports television debut appearance after qualifying for the final which was to be broadcast live by the company.

On 7 October 1998, high-profile French footballer David Ginola and Irish goalkeeper offered their services to play for a Derry City Select XI in a charity match in order to raise funds for Omagh's redevelopment after the town was bombed by the IRA earlier that year. The opposition that day, a Mick McCarthy Select XI, composed of players such as John Aldridge, Steve Staunton and Packie Bonner. Ginola is remembered for scoring a cheeky dink from a penalty which he sent straight down the middle of the goal after feigning and tricking the keeper into diving to the side. This was followed by a smug grin directed toward the 10,000-strong crowd – not at all in the spirit of sombre commemoration of the atrocity.

Due to the historical political situation in Northern Ireland, the fact that the Brandywell Stadium is situated in a largely nationalist area, and the long-term continuing existence of a degree of scepticism within that community towards a police service perceived as being a continuation of the Royal Ulster Constabulary, Derry's home games remain unique in that they are not policed by a state security force (the Police Service of Northern Ireland or PSNI) – rather, Derry City employs its own voluntary and private stewards to overlook matches. Every other club in the League of Ireland has a Garda presence (the Republic of Ireland's police force) at their stadiums. Derry had to receive special dispensation from UEFA back in 1985 as it was felt that the presence of the Royal Ulster Constabulary in areas like the Brandywell would be more likely to provoke trouble than help prevent it. This policy has proven effective, and for the last 20 years the Brandywell has peacefully entertained crowds of up to 10,000 without a single police officer present. However, the policy has also had the effect of further solidifying Derry's identity as a nationalist club and further alienated a number of its original or potential Protestant supporters. Nevertheless, the political situation in Northern Ireland is improving, largely due to the peace process and the subsequent Good Friday Agreement, and recent games against teams with unionist fanbases – such as Linfield – have passed off without major incident within the ground, although minor trouble did flare outside the ground on one occasion after a friendly game (which was also somewhat of a security trial) in 2005 in preparation for Derry's likely competing in a near-future Setanta Cup, where the chances of meeting Linfield in a competitive fixture would be very high, when a Linfield supporters' bus in the process of passing through the mainly-nationalist Foyle Road area was pelted with bricks and stones by youths on the road-side. With the incident, obviously sectarian in nature, occurring outside the ground and being instigated by individuals who were not actually present at the game, though, the PSNI accepted that it should have been their responsibility to ensure the safe passage of the fans. After the match itself having passed off peacefully, Jim Roddy, who was chairman of the club at the time, commented:

Football can bring people together and in these times of peace and a return to normality, we can show an example to the entire community.

Both sets of fans had obliged board requests to refrain from bringing to or displaying at the game, overtly political or religious emblems. In the era of building bridges and increasing tolerance, the Brandywell Stadium is usually left free of nationalist symbolism by fans during matches regardless, although Celtic jerseys can often be seen worn by some individuals in attendance. Tricolours are rarely, if ever, hung by official supporter groups unless the club is representing the League of Ireland abroad, for fear of alienating those members of the Protestant community who do actually attend games or to prevent the possibility of turning away potential supporters from that community, as well as in an effort to ensure that everyone is made to feel welcome in the Brandywell regardless of social, political, religious or cultural background. While the debate and political situation as regards the policing of nationalist areas in Northern Ireland is losing heat and becoming less hostile, it remains to be thought that the adequacy of Derry's own security personnel discards the need for state policing of games as far as the safety of match-goers is concerned.

== Financial difficulties and flirtation with relegation (2000–04) ==
Despite the club's successes, Derry City's path has not always been a smooth one. In September 2000, the club was in a crippled position from a financial perspective and on the verge of bankruptcy due to an unpaid tax bill. The Inland Revenue totalled the debt in the region of £180,000. The position had not been helped as the club was hit with misery on 27 July earlier that same year when the then-chairman, Kevin Friel, was killed in a road accident near Raphoe, County Donegal. Nevertheless, Jim Roddy convened a meeting of the club's shareholders and supporters to inform them that the club had debts nearing £180,000. Prior to that meeting Martin O'Neill, then manager of Scottish giants, Celtic, contacted Roddy, the stand-in chairman, to inform him that he would bring his side to the Brandywell in order to help raise funds for the beleaguered club. A number of other fund raising projects were also put together to help pay of the debts. Local band, the Undertones, played a benefit concert on 29 September, door to door collections took place around the city, while Phil Coulter, a singer from the city, hosted a golf classic on 27 September. Significantly, Derry-born politician John Hume, then a Member of the European Parliament for Northern Ireland, also helped by using his contacts in the parliament along with his powers of persuasion to convince a number of former European Cup winners to come to the Brandywell and play friendly matches to raise funds through gate receipts and save the club from extinction. Manchester United, FC Barcelona and Real Madrid, as well as Celtic, all visited Derry with star-studded teams between then and 2003 in order to help the club survive. The game against Barcelona is fondly remembered on the Brandywell terraces as the day that firm fan-favourite and club legend, Liam Coyle left the Catalan club's Carles Puyol "on his arse" as he utilised his trickery to beat the defender. The money brought through the turnstiles helped to keep the club in operation, but just about, as results on the field continued to deteriorate and Derry soon came dangerously close to relegation – something which would have been a financial nightmare for the club.

Although the club has never been relegated, in 2003 it came within a whisker of losing its long-established place in the Premier Division after finishing in 9th position and having to contest a two-legged relegation/promotion play-off with local Donegal rivals, Finn Harps, who had finished 2nd in that season's First Division. However, Derry won the game 2–1 on aggregate after extra-time in the Brandywell and remained in the top-flight. The second leg of the fixture was the last game ever that veteran, Liam Coyle, played for the club as he announced his retirement soon afterward. The next season – 2004 – was not much of an improvement and Derry struggled with relegation once again, finally finishing in 7th position. This poor display led to the sacking of Gavin Dykes, who was the manager at the time since 29 September 2003 after having taken over from Dermot Keely. Morale was at an all-time low after a couple of dire seasons.

== The introduction of full-time professional football and the reign of Stephen Kenny (2004–06) ==
Fortunes began to improve for the club when team-captain, Peter Hutton, took the role of player-manager for a temporary period until a new permanent manager was found. The club became the first club in Ireland to be awarded a premier UEFA licence in February 2004. The subsequent appointment of Stephen Kenny as manager later that year and the introduction of full-time football by the club helped these fortunes expand and the club soon began to regain past form. Kenny, later commenting on the situation upon his arrival at the club, said:

We had players living all over Ireland, some of them 200 kilometers away. They were training with local clubs in Dublin, Galway – all over Ireland – they would come to Derry, play the match and go home again. It wasn't acceptable.

Kenny insisted his players had to show their commitment by moving to Derry and becoming full-time footballers. The rewards were clear as Derry swapped the relegation battles of the previous five seasons by making a serious push for the title while placing themselves in contention for European competitions. In 2005, Kenny's first full season in charge, they finished in second position in the league. The league was lost on the last day in a game against Cork City at Turner's Cross, which had turned out to be the title-decider. Derry went into the game in the top spot and needing anything other than a defeat to secure the title but ended up losing the game, which meant that Cork by-passed them into first place. Nevertheless, Derry's team performances saw Mark Farren and Patrick McCourt rewarded as they scooped the Professional Footballers Association of Ireland's 'Premier Division Player of the Year' and 'Young Player of the Year' awards respectively, while Derry's finish in second place allowed them to enter the preliminary rounds of the 2006–07 UEFA Cup. The staggering progress of the club on this stage in the following season proved just how far Derry City had come.

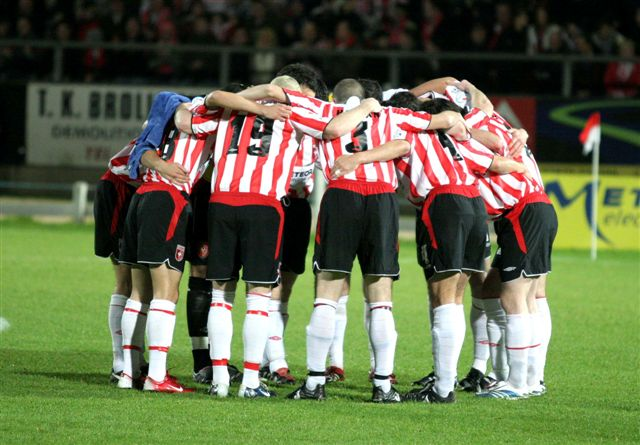
Derry City's players in a huddle prior to a 2006 eircom League game with rivals Shelbourne at the Brandywell.

Derry City's FAI League Cup victory in 2005 also saw the club compete in the second ever cross-border Setanta Cup in 2006. The creation of this tournament in 2005 was greatly aided by the lessening of sectarian tensions on the island of Ireland as a whole due to the Northern Ireland peace process and for the first time since their withdrawal from the Irish League in the early 1970s, Derry City hosted competitive matches against Linfield and Glentoran – teams with largely unionist fanbases – but failed in making it out of the initial group stage, even though they had lost only one game.

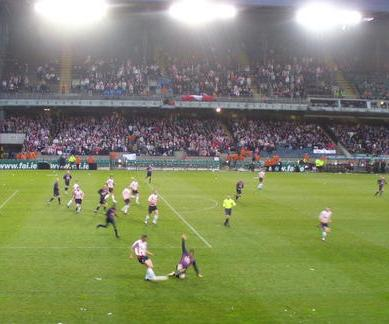
Derry City competing with St. Patrick's Athletic in the 2006 FAI Cup final at Lansdowne Road, Dublin.

Despite the encouraging progress, on 10 November 2006 manager Stephen Kenny announced he would be leaving the club to join Scottish side Dunfermline Athletic F.C. at the end of the 2006 season in order to further his career. His success at Derry had raised eyebrows across the water, and especially in Scotland, after the club's 5–1 demolition of Gretna on Scottish soil in the second qualifying round of the UEFA Cup. Early speculation linked Joe Kinnear to the soon-to-be-vacant managerial post at Derry City. However, by the end of November 2006 Pat Fenlon emerged as the preferred target of the Derry board. Kenny took up his position in Dunfermline on 18 November, which was the day after Derry City's last league game against Cork City at the Brandywell – a game which Derry won 1–0. However, Kenny's last game at the helm for Derry was when he returned from Dunfermline in an 'advisory role' for the Lansdowne Road encounter with St. Patrick's Athletic in the FAI Cup final. The game, the last match of association football to be staged at the old stadium prior to re-development, was a positive send-off for Kenny after Derry came back from being a goal down on three separate occasions and clinched the game with a 4–3 scoreline after extra time. With the club having won the FAI League Cup earlier in the season (for the second year running), in as equally dramatic fashion (the game went to penalties after Derry had been reduced to 9 men), the claiming of the FAI Cup amounted to a cup double for the team. The cup-win could easily have concluded a historic second treble-winning season. However, Derry just missed out on this after having come second in the eircom League to Shelbourne FC on goal-difference prior to the FAI Cup final. In total, 32 players represented the club under Kenny. His win percentage was 58 per cent while his teams managed to keep 57 clean-sheets out of 112 games.

After the FAI Cup final and a civic reception organised by the Mayor of Derry to honour the successful 2007 season, it was announced that coach, Declan Devine, would also be on his way to Dunfermline Athletic to take up a coaching post under Kenny, while Kenny's assistant manager, Paul Hegarty, was associated with the vacant managerial position left by Anthony Gorman at Finn Harps. Similarly, first-choice goalkeeper, David Forde, decided to move on from the Brandywell and signed with Cardiff City on a free transfer as he was out of contract.

== Recent times (2006–present) ==
After a period of much speculation and rumour, Pat Fenlon was finally appointed as manager of Derry City on 8 December 2006 for a three-year-long contract to fill the void left by former boss, Stephen Kenny. He is Derry's twelfth manager since the club joined the League of Ireland. During a press conference on 12 December Fenlon confirmed that he had already undertaken the challenge of finding a replacement for departed goal-keeper, David Forde, as well as convincing the club's out-of-contract squad-members to re-sign for the 2007 season. He outlined these as his priorities before he would begin searching for new signings from other clubs.

On 12 December 2006, it was also announced that Derry City had not only been accepted into the new-look League of Ireland for the 2007 season (membership of which was decided by criteria other than points attained in the previous season for this season only), but had scored the highest number of points between those teams accepted – 830 – for on-field and off-field criteria determined by the FAI's Independent Assessment Group.

Prior to this, Derry City were entered into the draw for the 2007 Setanta Cup (qualifying due to their successes in 2006) on 7 December 2006 and were drawn in a very competitive Group 1 with Drogheda United, Glentoran and Linfield.

Shaun Holmes, Mark McChrystal and Stephen O'Flynn all joined David Forde on the way out after they were released by the club on 14 December 2006. Likewise, on 15 December 2006 Paul Hegarty announced that he would be moving on from his role as assistant manager due to difficulties in relation to Pat Fenlon's new training schedules for the 2007 season, while Colm O'Neill, a fitness coach at the club, also left to join Stephen Kenny in Dunfermline.

Although some reports claimed that Curtis Fleming was to take the vacant assistant manager's position left at the club by the departure of much of Stephen Kenny's staff, Pat Fenlon revealed that Anthony Gorman would fill the spot on 31 December. Fenlon also helped commit Ruaidhri Higgins to the club for another two seasons just two days later, but decided that Clive Delaney was not in his plans and let the club release him on 21 December 2006. With goal-keeper Pat Jennings Jr. signing a new contract with the club in January 2007, Fenlon was also linked with bringing in tall Norwegian striker, Øyvind Hoås of Fredrikstad, and highly rated Irish League player, Conor Downey of Cliftonville FC. Nevertheless, released Irish Manchester United youngster, Kyle Moran, and former Irish school-boy international, Karl Bermingham, were invited to the club for a trial period prior to the 2007 season's kick-off.

On 19 January 2007, David Forde's performances for Derry during the 2006 campaign were rewarded with the presenting of the eircom/Soccer Writers' Association of Ireland's 'Goalkeeper of the Year' award. Pat Fenlon was also named as 'Personality of the Year' after his league success at Shelbourne FC. During the awards ceremony, held in Dundalk, Dermot Ahern, the Irish Minister for Foreign Affairs, who was a guest in attendance and gave a speech, claimed that the two highlights of the league year for himself had been his presence at two historic occasions in the Brandywell; the club's Setanta Sports Cup game against Linfield FC and the UEFA Cup match with Paris Saint-Germain. He poured praise on the club, its fans, players, staff and board, claiming that its efforts and achievements had ramifications way beyond sport. Only days later, the club as a whole was awarded the Belfast Telegraph's Sports Award for 2006 after its displays during the season.

Derry's first signing of 2007 was eventually announced on 28 January – Pat Fenlon convinced one of his former Shelbourne F.C. players, Dave Rogers, an experienced defender, to join him at the Brandywell. Karl Bermingham's signature followed on 2 February 2007 after a successful trial spell. A few days later, other trialist, Kyle Moran also signed a one-year contract. On 20 February, Fenlon convinced another former Shelbourne player – Greg O'Halloran – to join him in Derry on a two-year contract.

Fenlon's reign began with a win in his first competitive game against Glentoran in the Setanta Cup on 26 February 2007. Two days later, he made another new addition to his squad – Peter Hynes – while also allowing fellow newcomer, Kyle Moran, to move to Shelbourne on loan to aid his fitness and development. By 5 March, the manager looked to have his preparations for the new season complete as he signed Swedish goalkeeper, Ola Tidman, and former Irish international, Alan Moore.

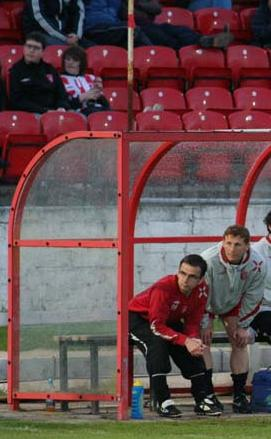
Pat Fenlon (left) with his assistant, Anthony Gorman.

With Derry opening their title challenge at home to Bray Wanderers on 9 March 2007, Kevin McHugh was the first player to score of the new season as Derry went on to win by this single goal. Under a week later, after the 'Erin Go Brawl' boxing bout between Derry boxer John Duddy and Anthony Bonsante on 16 March 2007 in Madison Square Garden, New York, a Derry City flag was held behind Duddy during the victor's television interview. In the meantime, despite the club being pitted as favourites for the title by numerous bookmakers at the outset of the season, Derry City made a poor start, losing to strong title-contenders St. Patrick's Athletic and Drogheda United in their early-season confrontations. They also fell to Cork City at home in the fifth series of games to a score-line of 4–1. The last time Derry City conceded four goals at home in the League of Ireland had been when Cork City ran out 4–1 winners at the Brandywell in April 2000. Having won only three games from nine competitive matches prior to this game, Pat Jennings Jr., the goalkeeper, was viewed as being at fault for quite a number of Derry's conceded goals and was dropped for Ola Tidman to make his debut. Conceding four goals on his debut, however, Tidman also failed to inspire confidence as the club seemed to be missing David Forde following his pre-season departure to Cardiff City. The team in general appeared to be lacking in the drive and tenacity that was once present under Stephen Kenny and were failing to create clear-cut, goal-scoring chances. The loaning out of attacking midfielder, Ciarán Martyn, on 31 March 2007, Norwegian top division team Fredrikstad F.K. until 15 July 2007 (with the future option of that club being able to purchase the player for an agreed fee if they so wished) did not help matters, although Derry City did stand to make a considerable profit from the deal and were thus realistically unable to turn it down. The club's poor streak eventually came to an end on 13 April 2007 when a goal by Peter Hutton gave Derry a 1–0 away victory over Waterford United. However, the club fell to a 2–1 away defeat to Drogheda United in their next game – the last series of games in the group stage of the 2007 Setanta Cup. This saw them depart from the tournament before the knock-out stage, the club having won only one of their six games. This was the second year in a row that the club was eliminated from the competition's group stage. The club's poor form continued as they went down to a 1–0 score-line at home to UCD in their following league game.

Fenlon signed former Middlesbrough goalkeeper Ben Roberts on 12 May 2007 to help solve the club's defensive problems. However, on 22 May 2007, Fenlon resigned as manager, and Peter Hutton took control of the team. Roberts was also released days into his contract after sustaining an injury.

Derry City has maintained a consistent presence in the top division of Irish football in the 21st century, but has been unable to break through to win a league title. The team has been very successful in the 2020s, taking second place in the league in 2022 and 2023.

== History in European competition (1964–present) ==
Derry City have qualified for European football several times throughout the club's history, and more so in recent years. Steaua București beat the club 5–1 on aggregate in the European Cup Winners' Cup, during Derry's first European outing in the 1964–65 season. The following season, Derry became the first Irish League team to win a European tie over two legs by beating Lyn Oslo when, after losing 5–3 in the Oslo, they won 8–6 on aggregate. The second round saw R.S.C. Anderlecht hammer Derry 9–0 in Belgium, however. The second leg of the tie was never played as the Irish Football Association banned the use of Derry's home-ground, the Brandywell, for the tie, with the fixture being announced as a walkover. Between then and now the likes of Vitesse Arnhem and former European Cup winners, Benfica, have visited the Brandywell to play competitive European football.

Following the League title win in the 1996–97 season, Derry represented the league in the UEFA Champions League. However, in the first qualifying round, they were knocked out by NK Maribor of Slovenia. The club's only win on the European stage previous to this, of course, had been in the 1965–66 season when they defeated F.C. Lyn Oslo by an 8–6 aggregate scoreline in the European Cup. After the NK Maribor experience, it would take 7 more years until Derry would again compete in European football. However, this time in the 2002–03 season, it would be in the UEFA Cup following their FAI Cup victory in 2002. The club failed to progress once more, knocked out by Cypriot side APOEL on this occasion by an aggregate score of 5–1 after hoping they had kept the tie alive with just a 2–1 defeat in the first leg away in Cyprus.

Derry once again qualified for the UEFA Cup for the 2006–07 season after finishing runners-up in the Premier Division in the 2005 season. On 13 July 2006, Derry overcame two-time winners IFK Göteborg in the UEFA Cup First Qualifying Round by an aggregate score of 2–0. A 79th-minute header from Sean Hargan was enough to give Derry a shock win in the first leg, and Stephen O'Flynn ensured a 1–0 home victory from the penalty spot. Manager Stephen Kenny was delighted with the win stating:

They have won the UEFA Cup twice and only a few years ago were in the group stages of the Champions League so this is a great night for everyone connected with Derry City. We were worthy winners. It is not as if we got a goal and held on. I think we played the better football.

The league's low coefficient ranking of 35th had led to arrogant underestimation of the club's standard and before the win, IFK Göteborg's Niclas Alexandersson had rather misguidedly suggested that his team could take a holiday and still walkover the League of Ireland side. This marked Derry City's first progression in European football since defeating Lyn Oslo more than 40 years previously.

Derry City were subsequently drawn against Scottish second-level side Gretna in the second qualifying round. On 10 August 2006, Derry claimed a 5–1 away win to gain a considerable advantage going into the home leg. This result is the largest away winning margin for a League of Ireland team in Europe. Following a 2–2 home draw with Gretna in the second leg and a 7–3 win on aggregate, Derry advanced to the UEFA Cup first round. In the draw, held on 25 August 2006, Derry City were handed a tough tie against Paris Saint-Germain FC.

The first leg, broadcast live on Eurosport, was played at home at Brandywell Stadium on the evening of 14 September and ended in a 0–0 draw. The second leg was played at Parc des Princes on 28 September after the club were given the honour of a civic reception in Paris by the Irish ambassador to France, Anne Anderson. Paris St. Germain won the second leg 2–0 with first-half goals deriving from sloppy set-piece defending in the first-half. Édouard Cissé and Pauleta were the goal-scorers. Thus, 2–0 was the overall aggregate score of the tie.

By finishing second in the eircom League Premier Division in 2006, Derry, once again, secured the return of UEFA Cup football to the Brandywell for the 2007–08 European season. Having later gone on to win the 2006 FAI Cup, which also rewarded the winner with a UEFA Cup spot, this win and qualification-route took prominence over the league qualification, and Derry's UEFA Cup qualification on account of their final league position was transferred to the next best-placed team below them – that was Drogheda United who took third spot.

On 8 January 2007, however, it was reported that Derry, as league runners-up in 2006, may qualify for the 2007–08 Champions League First Qualifying Round instead in the place of Shelbourne as the league-winners' place was placed under threat by financial problems which could have prevented the club from being awarded the required UEFA licence to compete. Indeed, Shelbourne's board effectively jumped before being pushed and eventually opted out of competing, fearing that any team they fielded would damage the UEFA coefficient of the eircom League as the club had had to release their whole first-team prior to the 2007 season and build a new team with mainly youth players. This gave Derry the opportunity to take part in the Champions League. Derry City were awarded a UEFA licence on 17 April 2007 by the FAI's First Instance Committee, officially permitting them to represent the eircom League in the UEFA Champions League for the 2007–08 European season. For that season's Champions League, Derry entered the first qualifying round draw as a seeded team, having had their UEFA coefficients boosted heavily after their successful run in 2006.

Following the 2007-08 campaign, Derry City qualified for the preliminary rounds of the UEFA Europa League 6 times. The 2009-10 campaign was the most successful for the club, when they automatically qualified for round 2, and defeated Latvian Club Skonto FC two to one on aggregate. The addition of the UEFA Conference League in 2021 brought new opportunities for European success for Derry City. The club qualified for the preliminary rounds in three of the first four years of the competitions existence. The most successful UEFA Conference League season came in 2023-24, when Derry City won two qualifying round matches on aggregate against Faroese club Havnar Bóltfelag and Finnish club Kuopion Palloseura.
