= Mukendi =

Mukendi is a surname. Notable people with the surname include:

- Henoc Mukendi (born 1993), Congolese footballer
- Ilunga Mukendi (born 1997), Congolese-born South African rugby union player
- José Mukendi (1961-2006), Congolese footballer
- Josué Alex Mukendi, Congolese politician
- Mulumba Mukendi (born 1985), Congolese footballer
- Olivier Mukendi (born 1991), Congolese-Belgian footballer
- Pierre Kalala Mukendi (1939–2015), Congolese footballer
- Vinny Mukendi (born 1992), British-born Congolese footballer
