= S. R. Russell =

S. R. Russell can refer to:

- Steve Russell (computer scientist)
- Sam Russell (footballer born 1900)
