= John Crossan =

John Crossan may refer to:

- Johnny Crossan (born 1938), Northern Irish footballer
- John Dominic Crossan (born 1934), Irish-American religious scholar
