= List of Derry City F.C. seasons =

List of Derry City Football Club seasons.

== Seasons ==
Season	League											Irish Cup	Gold Cup	City Cup	Top Four Cup	Top goalscorer(s)		Avg. Att.
Season	Division	Tier	P	W	D	L	F	A	+/-	Pts	Pos	Irish Cup	Gold Cup	City Cup	Top Four Cup	Name	Goals	Avg. Att.
1962–63	Irish League	1	22	8	5	9	34	38	−4	21	9th		RU					
1963–64	Irish League	1	22	13	3	6	59	33	+26	29	3rd	W						
1964–65	Irish League	1	22	15	5	2	62	32	+30	35	1st		W					
1965–66	Irish League	1	22	15	2	5	61	33	+28	32	2nd				W			
1966–67	Irish League	1	22	11	5	6	51	42	+9	27	3rd							
1967–68	Irish League	1	22	11	1	10	51	54	−3	23	5th							
1968–69	Irish League	1	22	15	2	5	57	30	+20	32	2nd							
1969–70	Irish League	1	22	11	5	6	38	31	+7	27	5th							
1970–71	Irish League	1	22	7	5	10	45	46	−1	19	9th	RU						
1971–72	Irish League	1	22	4	8	10	41	55	−14	16	9th							

As a result of the Troubles in the 1970s Derry City were banned from playing home games at The Brandywell. Forced to play in front of dwindelling crowds and unable to continue financially Derry withdrew from the Irish League in 1972. Continuing as a Sunday league team the period was known as the Wilderness Years before they joined the League of Ireland in 1985.

Season	League											FAI Cup	League Cup	Setanta Cup	Europe		Top goalscorer(s)		Avg. Att.
Season	Division	Tier	P	W	D	L	F	A	+/-	Pts	Pos	FAI Cup	League Cup	Setanta Cup	Europe		Name	Goals	Avg. Att.
1985–86	First	2	18	8	6	4	31	18	+13	22	4th	QF		Founded; 2005					
1986–87	First ↑	2	18	16	1	1	45	14	+30	33	1st	QF		Founded; 2005					
1987–88	Premier	1	33	13	5	15	59	44	+15	31	8th	RU		Founded; 2005					
1988–89	Premier	1	34	25	5	4	70	21	+49	53	1st	W	W	Founded; 2005	Cup Winners' Cup	R1			
1989–90	Premier	1	33	20	9	4	72	18	+54	49	2nd	SF	RU	Founded; 2005	European Cup	R1			
1990–91	Premier	1	33	13	9	11	51	28	+28	35	7th		W	Founded; 2005	UEFA Cup	R1			
1991–92	Premier	1	33	17	15	10	49	21	+28	44	2nd		W	Founded; 2005					
1992–93	Premier	1	32	11	15	6	26	23	+3	37	5th	SF		Founded; 2005	UEFA Cup	R1			
1993–94	Premier	1	32	12	10	10	37	35	+2	46	4th	RU	W	Founded; 2005					
1994–95	Premier	1	33	16	10	7	45	30	+15	58	2nd	W		Founded; 2005					
1995–96	Premier	1	33	11	13	9	50	38	+12	46	6th			Founded; 2005	Cup Winners' Cup	QR1			
1996–97	Premier	1	33	19	10	4	58	27	+31	67	1st	RU		Founded; 2005					
1997–98	Premier	1	33	10	10	13	30	31	−1	40	9th			Founded; 2005	Champions League	QR1			
1998–99	Premier	1	33	12	9	12	34	32	+2	45	5th	QF		Founded; 2005					
1999–2000	Premier	1	33	12	10	11	32	38	−6	46	7th		W	Founded; 2005					
2000–01	Premier	1	33	12	9	12	31	38	−7	45	6th			Founded; 2005					
2001–02	Premier	1	33	14	9	10	42	30	+12	51	5th	SF	RU	Founded; 2005					
2002–03	Premier	1	27	8	7	12	31	37	−6	31	8th	W (Note: Before the move from a winter to summer season, two FAI Cup competitions were held during 2002. The first won by Dundalk was part of the 2001–02 season and a second won by Derry City held during the 2002–03 interim season. The early finish allowed for 2003 season to begin in March.)	N/A (Note: No League cup held during transitional season.)	Founded; 2005					
2003	Premier	1	36	7	15	14	33	51	−18	36	9th	R2		Founded; 2005	UEFA Cup	QR			2,265
2004	Premier	1	36	11	11	14	23	32	−9	44	7th	SF	GS	Founded; 2005					1,672
2005	Premier	1	33	22	6	5	56	25	+31	72	2nd	SF	W	DNQ			Mark Farren	18	2,698
2006	Premier	1	30	18	8	4	46	20	+26	62	2nd	W	W	GS	UEFA Cup	R1	Mark Farren	9	3,200
2007	Premier	1	33	8	13	12	30	31	−1	37	7th	RU	W	SF	Champions League	QR1			2,913
2008	Premier	1	33	16	10	7	46	25	+21	58	3rd	QF	W	GS			Mark Farren	16	3,121
2009	Premier ↓	1	36	18	5	13	49	31	+18	59	4th (Note: Relegated in 2009 for breaking financial rules.)	R4	R2	disq.	Europa League	QR3	Mark Farren	10	2,457
2010	First ↑	2	33	20	9	4	65	24	+41	69	1st	R3	QF	DNQ			Mark Farren	18	1,965
2011	Premier	1	18	14	4	4	63	23	+40	68	3rd	R3	W	DNQ			Éamon Zayed	22	2,135
2012	Premier	1	30	11	6	13	36	36	0	39	5th	W	QF	RU			David McDaid	11	1,460
2013	Premier	1	33	17	5	11	57	39	+18	56	4th	QF	SF	QF	Europa League	QR2	Rory Patterson	18	1,446
2014	Premier	1	33	9	11	13	42	43	−1	38	8th	RU	QF	DNQ	Europa League	QR2	Michael Duffy	11	1,106
2015	Premier	1	33	9	8	16	32	42	−10	35	7th	QF	QF	Abolished			Mark Timlin	8	1,493
2016	Premier	1	33	17	11	5	48	29	+19	62	3rd	SF	SF				Rory Patterson	17	1,613
2017	Premier	1	33	14	9	10	49	40	+9	51	4th	SF	SF		Europa League	QR1	Barry McNamee	10	1,383
2018	Premier	1	36	13	3	20	47	70	-23	42	8th	SF	SF		Europa League	QR1	Aaron McEneff	10	2,072
2019	Premier	1	36	15	12	9	56	34	+22	57	4th	R2	RU				Junior Ogedi-Uzokwe	14	2,861
2020	Premier	1	18	5	5	8	18	18	0	20	7th	QF	Abolished		Europa League	QR1	Walter Figueira	4	0
2021	Premier	1	36	14	12	10	49	42	+7	54	4th	2R					Jamie McGonigle	7	726
2022	Premier	1	36	18	12	6	53	27	+26	66	2nd	W			Europa Conference League	QR1	Jamie McGonigle	11	3,245
2023	Premier	1	36	18	11	7	57	24	+33	65	2nd	2R			Europa Conference League	QR3	Jordan McEneff	8	3,228
2024	Premier	1	36	14	13	9	48	31	+17	55	4th	RU			Europa Conference League	QR1	Patrick Hoban	14	2,871
2025	Premier	1																	
