= Foyle Cup =

Northern Ireland youth football tournament

The Foyle Cup is a youth football tournament held every year in Derry City, County Londonderry, Northern Ireland. Along with the SuperCupNI, which takes place around the same time, The Foyle Cup is one of Ireland and indeed Europe's premier youth tournaments.

== History ==
The competition began in 1992 with only eight teams competing. It is seen as one of the most important and pivotal tournaments in Northern Ireland, as it presents an opportunity for the youth of Northern Ireland to show their abilities. Academy teams of such European clubs as Werder Bremen, IFK Göteborg and Ferencváros have participated in the tournament, along with teams from the U.S. and Canada in recent times. It is widely recognised as a tournament that launches the careers of young players aspiring to sign professional contracts. In 2003 former Republic of Ireland player and current Sunderland chairman, Niall Quinn launched the tournament. The 2006 competition was launched by Lawrie Sanchez. In June 2007, Foyle Cup chairman, Michael Hutton confirmed that the 2007 competition will feature special guest, Liverpool F.C. legend Phil Neal. The competition has been title sponsored by local businesses such as Football special cola and Hughes insurance.

== Location ==
All Foyle Cup matches are played around County Londonderry and the surrounding area, including Letterkenny and Strabane. Final matches are played in The Brandywell Stadium, although, from time to time, it may vary.

== Notable past participants ==
- (Belgium) K.S.C. Lokeren Oost-Vlaanderen
- (Canada) Ottawa Fury FC
- (Denmark) AC Horsens
- (England) Altrincham FC
- (England) AFC Bournemouth
- (England) Fulham F.C.
- (England) Norwich City F.C.
- (England) Port Vale F.C.
- (England) Sheffield United F.C.
- (England) Sheffield Wednesday F.C.
- (France) Montpellier Hérault SC
- (Germany) Arminia Bielefeld
- (Germany) Werder Bremen
- (Hungary) Ferencváros
- (Republic of Ireland) Cherry Orchard F.C.
- (Republic of Ireland) Bohemians F.C.
- (Republic of Ireland) Finn Harps F.C.
- (Republic of Ireland) Letterkenny Rovers F.C.
- (Italy) Brescia Calcio
- (Northern Ireland) Armagh City F.C.
- (Northern Ireland) Ballymena United F.C.
- (Northern Ireland) Derry City F.C.
- (Northern Ireland) Portstewart F.C.
- (Northern Ireland) Coleraine F.C.
- (Northern Ireland) Glentoran F.C.
- (Northern Ireland) Institute F.C.
- (Northern Ireland) Linfield F.C.
- (Scotland) Aberdeen F.C.
- (Scotland) Celtic F.C.
- (Scotland) Heart of Midlothian F.C.
- (Scotland) Hibernian F.C.
- (Sweden) IFK Göteborg
- (United States) Inter CT F.C.

Other regular teams to appear

- (Northern Ireland) Derry and District League Youth Teams
- (Republic of Ireland) USL Youth teams
