= Harris Chueu =

South African football manager

Harris Chueu is a former South African footballer and football manager, who currently works as goalkeeper coach by Mamelodi Sundowns.

== Career ==
During his career he played with Derry City FC of the League of Ireland.

== Coaching career ==
In the past, he also managed the Orlando Pirates and Mamelodi Sundowns.
