= Derry and District League =

Football league in Derry, Northern Ireland

The Derry and District League is an amateur football league in Derry, Northern Ireland. The league includes youth and senior football teams. The Senior Sunday League has two divisions, the Premier and the First Division. The Youth Leagues have one league for each age group, from under-10 up to under-17. Teams such as Don Bosco's, Culmore Y.F.C. and Tristar Boys have numerous teams competing at every level. Other senior teams include Brandywell Harps, Trojans and, in the First Division, Lisahally. The league has witnessed a rise in popularity in recent years, and youth teams, such as Foyle Harps and the Derry and District Youth Select have competed on an international level both in China and Spain respectively. There is also a Saturday Morning League operating in Derry. The League also sends youth teams to the Foyle Cup and in 2005 the under-16 team finished runners up in the competition, losing out to Ferencváros. Many of the players in that team have since signed professional contracts. Kevin Deery, Barry Molloy and Patrick McCourt are now Derry City players, after playing youth football in the league.

== Northwest Saturday Morning League ==
The Northwest Saturday Morning League features two divisions, (Premier Division and First Division). Matches are played on Saturday mornings.

=== Premier Division ===
- Cliftonvilla F.C.
- Phoenix Swifts F.C.
- Brandywell Celtic F.C.
- Bohemians F.C.
- Mourne Harps F.C.
- Newton Heath F.C.
- Magee College F.C.
- Cloony YC F.C.
- Gransha F.C.
- Corinthians F.C.

=== First Division ===
- Tamnaherin Celtic F.C.
- Du Pont F.C.
- Abercorn F.C.
- Oxford Utd F.C.
- Foyle Harps F.C.
- Benbradagh Colts F.C.
- St. Columb's College F.C.
- Northside Albion F.C.
- Foyle Athletic F.C.
- Drumahoe YCMA F.C.
- West Galliagh F.C.
- Westbank Utd F.C.
- Sion Swifts F.C.

== Senior Sunday Morning League ==
The Senior Sunday League of the Derry and District League features two divisions (Premier Division and First Division). The leagues include a number of sporting establishments, clubs and groups, including pub teams. In the past, the Derry and District FA had three divisions. Matches are played, as suggested on Sunday mornings.

=== Premier Division ===
- Oxford United (Reserve Team)
- Don Bosco's F.C.
- Top of the Hill Celtic F.C.
- Abercorn F.C.
- Porters F.C.
- Dungloe
- Brandywell Harps F.C.
- Celtic Swifts F.C.
- Three Flowers F.C.
- The Beechtree
- Bluebell Celtic
- Culmore Colts

=== First Division ===
- Oxford Colts (Youth Team)
- Bogside Inn F.C.
- Don Bosco's F.C.
- Downey's F.C.
- Carraig Bar F.C.
- City Harps F.C.
- Lisahally F.C.
- Culmore F.C.
- Tristar Boys F.C.
- Phoenix Athletic F.C.
- Crescent F.C.
- Maydown F.C.
- Ballymoor F.C.

== Youth Leagues ==
The Derry and District League Youth team who finished runners up in the Copa Catalunya Youth Cup 2006

The Derry and District League's youth leagues feature countless teams from age groups Under-10 up until Under-17. The leagues are held in high regard by many who are associated with sport in Derry. Each year, a Derry and District League Select (in which the best players are selected from each team) appears in a number of different tournaments for example, the Foyle Cup. They also travel abroad to compete in tournaments across the globe, for example, in Spain, Denmark, Italy and England. In 2005, the youth team finished third in the Tivoli Cup in Denmark. In 2006 the Derry and District under-14 team travelled to Barcelona to challenge in the prestigious Copa Catalunya International Youth Tournament. They finished runners up. Foyle Harps travelled to China on an international relations trip. There, they visited places of cultural significance and played football against some of China's top youth teams. In 2004–5, Derry City pioneered an 'Academy' which was primarily made up of players from the Derry and District League.

=== Youth teams ===
The following is a list of teams who either have youth football teams or operate solely as a youth team.

- Bright Stars F.C.
- Ballymoor F.C.
- Clooney FC
- Culmore Y.F.C.
- Don Bosco's F.C.
- Eglinton Eagles F.C.
- Foyle Harps Y.F.C.
- Newbuildings Utd F.C
- Newtown Y.F.C.
- Top of the Hill Celtic F.C.
- Tristar Boys F.C.
- Strabane Athletic F.C.
- Sion Swifts F.C
- Trojans F.C.
- Petrie Wanderers
- Oxford United Stars Youth

== Notable players ==
Notable players, who have played in the league, include:

- David Campbell
- Liam Coyle
- Kevin Deery
- Gary Fleming
- Darron Gibson
- Ruaidhrí Higgins
- Rick O'Shea
- Jimmy Kelly
- Sean Hargan
- Ryan McBride
- Patrick McCourt
- Barry Molloy
- Sam Morrow
- David Ogilby
- Shane Duffy
- Aaron McEneff
