= Eddie Crossan =

Northern Irish footballer

Personal information
- Full name: Edward Crossan
- Date of birth: 17 November 1925
- Place of birth: Derry, Northern Ireland
- Date of death: 13 June 2006 (aged 80)
- Place of death: Derry, Northern Ireland
- Position: Inside forward

Senior career*
Years	Team	Apps	(Gls)
- Glentoran
- Derry City
1947–1957	Blackburn Rovers	287	(73)
1957–1958	Tranmere Rovers	39	(6)
- Cork Hibernians
Total		326+	(79+)

International career
1949–1955	Northern Ireland	3	(1)
- * Club domestic league appearances and goals

Edward Crossan (17 November 1925 – 13 June 2006) was a Northern Irish footballer who played at both professional and international levels, as an inside forward.

== Career ==
Born in Derry, Crossan spent his early career in his native Northern Ireland with Glentoran and Derry City, before signing with English club Blackburn Rovers in November 1947. Crossan spent eleven seasons in the Football League with both Blackburn and Tranmere Rovers, scoring 79 goals in 326 games. He later played for Cork Hibernians.

Crossan also earned three caps for Northern Ireland between 1949 and 1955, scoring one goal, including appearing in one FIFA World Cup qualifying match.

== Personal life ==
Crossan retired to Derry, where he raised nine children.

His younger brother Johnny was also a footballer.
