= Nelson da Silva =

Brazilian footballer

Nelson da Silva (? – before 1997) was a Brazilian footballer who played in the League of Ireland with Derry City F.C. in the late 1980s. He was married and died young at some point before 1997.

== Honours ==
- League of Ireland First Division Shield: 1
  - Derry City F.C. 1985-86
