= Gerry Bowler =

Northern Irish footballer

Personal information
- Full name: Gerard Columba Bowler
- Date of birth: 8 June 1919
- Place of birth: Derry, Ireland
- Date of death: 26 March 2006 (aged 86)
- Place of death: Redhill, England
- Height: 6 ft 0 in (1.83 m)
- Positions: Right back; right half

Senior career*
Years	Team	Apps	(Gls)
- Distillery
1946–1949	Portsmouth	8	(0)
1949–1950	Hull City	38	(0)
1950–1955	Millwall	165	(0)
Total		211	(0)

International career
	Northern Ireland	3	(0)
- * Club domestic league appearances and goals

Gerard Columba Bowler (8 June 1919 – 26 March 2006) was a Northern Ireland international footballer. He played in the right-back or right-half positions.

== Career ==
Bowler was born in Derry, Ireland and began his senior footballing career with Derry City FC immediately prior to World War II, having previously turned out for Derry Municipal Training College. On 24 April 1943 he was signed by Distillery, in an Irish League record £1,000 deal, where he played 122 first-team games, scoring just once (a penalty against Cliftonville FC in 1946). At Distillery, Bowler played in the 1946 Irish Cup final, losing out 3-0 to Linfield FC, and the same season picked up a County Antrim Shield winner's medal (defeating Bangor FC Reserves 3-0 in a replayed final).

In the summer of 1946 Bowler was signed by Portsmouth FC (at the time one of the top teams in the Football League), but made just eight league appearances in three seasons, missing out on a championship medal in 1948-49.

Signed by Hull City A.F.C. for the 1949-50 season, Bowler made 38 Division Two appearances, and was selected to play for Ireland. That season he played in all three games of the 1950 British Home Championship. Normally a centre-half, all three of his international appearances were made in unfamiliar positions - two at right-back, and one at right-half.

In 1950, Bowler moved on again, signing for Division Three (South), Millwall. He helped the club to runners-up position in 1952-53, but in those days that was not good enough for promotion. Although he never added to his collection of international caps, Bowler was a member of the IFA's touring party to North America in the summer of 1953. After 165 league appearances for the Lions, Gerry Bowler was forced to retire due to injury in 1955, although he did continue to turn out as player-manager for his work team, the Crawley-based APV Chemical Company, until the 1962/63 season. Having settled in the south of England, Bowler died in Redhill, Surrey in March 2006.
