= Jimmy Elwood =

Irish footballer

Jimmy Elwood (12 June 1901 – 30 November 1936) was an Irish footballer who played as a centre-half.

== Career ==
He played for Glentoran FC, Manchester City FC, Chesterfield FC, Bradford Park Avenue and Derry City FC. He was capped twice for Ireland in 1929.

Elwood died in 1937 aged 36.
