= Barry Molloy =

Irish association football player

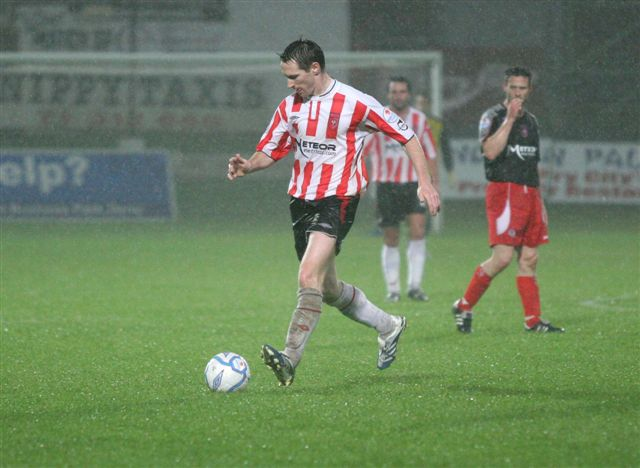
- Barry Molloy (centre)

Personal information
- Date of birth: 28 November 1983 (age 42)
- Place of birth: Derry, Northern Ireland
- Position: Midfielder

Youth career
- 2004: Derby County

Senior career*
Years	Team	Apps	(Gls)
2004	Drogheda United		
2004–2015	Derry City		
2015–2016	Crusaders		
2016–2017	Finn Harps		
Total		220	(3)

International career
2001	Republic of Ireland U21	3	(0)
- * Club domestic league appearances and goals

Barry Molloy (born 28 November 1983) is an Irish retired footballer who played for Drogheda United, Derry City, Crusaders and Finn Harps. He began his career as a youth player at Derby County.

He spent the majority of his career playing with his hometown club Derry City, with whom he served as captain. He is generally considered to be a club legend by the Brandywell fan base.

Molloy was a member of successful Derry squads which won two FAI Cups in 2006 and 2012, and five League of Ireland Cups in 2005, 2006, 2007, 2008, and 2011. He also played a key role in helping Derry return to the Irish top flight after winning the 2010 League of Ireland First Division.
