= José Mukendi =

Democratic Republic of the Congo footballer

José Mukendi Tshilumba (born 1961 in Zaire) (sometimes spelled Mokendi) played international football for Zaire and club football for Derry City and Finn Harps. He died in London in 2006 at the age of 45.

His son, Marc, played for Derry, Finn Harps and Coleraine.
