= Tony O'Doherty =

Irish footballer and manager

Anthony O'Doherty (born 23 April 1947) is a Northern Irish former footballer and football manager.

A native of Creggan, Derry, O'Doherty played for Coleraine FC, Derry City FC, Finn Harps, Dundalk FC and briefly for Ballymena United and also internationally for Northern Ireland in the British Home Championship against England in front of a crowd of 100,000 at the old Wembley Stadium on 21 April 1970. In total, he won two international caps.

From 1993 to 1994, O'Doherty managed his old club, Derry City.

== Other ==
According to Eamonn McCann, O'Doherty headed the Free Derry Police for a time in the early 1970s.

O'Doherty now writes an opinion-based column, the "Doc's Prescription", in the sports section one of the Derry Journal.

== Honours ==
- Blaxnit Cup
  - Coleraine F.C. 1969
- FAI Cup
  - Finn Harps 1974
  - Dundalk 1981
