= Sam Russell (footballer, born 1900) =

Irish footballer

Samuel R. Russell (2 January 1900 – 8 November 1959) was an Irish footballer. He was born in Downpatrick, Ireland. During his career he had spells with Derry City, Newcastle United and Bradford City. He also represented the Ireland national team on three occasions between 1929 and 1931.

== Personal life ==
Russell served in the Royal Irish Fusiliers during the First World War. He was married but he and his wife Margaret had no children.
