= Terry Kelly (Irish footballer) =

Northern Irish footballer

Terry Kelly was a Northern Irish footballer who was the captain of Derry City in 1985. He is noted for being the first football player in the world to captain the same team for whom he played in two different national leagues.
