= Sammy Curran =

Irish footballer

Sammy Curran was an Irish international footballer who played as a centre-forward. It was said of Curran that

"Another record which Belfast Celtic can honestly claim is that Sammy Curran (centre forward) has the greatest number of goals to his credit during his first four years of Senior football than any other player in the game, and will still bang them in."

Curran made headlines as goal-getter with Carrick-based intermediate club, Woodburn, and brought the attentions of the Irish League's top clubs. Belfast Celtic won the race for his signature, usurping Linfield at the last minute. He made his Belfast Celtic debut in a 1–0 defeat at the hands of Glenavon on 22 August 1925. He found the back of the net on 51 occasions as the Gibson Cup (Irish League), Irish Cup, Gold Cup, City Cup and Belfast Charities Cup (shared with Glentoran) all returned to Paradise.

Individual highlights included a hat-trick in the 3–2 Irish Cup final victory over Linfield and a brace in a 4–2 friendly win against Glasgow Celtic on Easter Monday 1926. Impressive club form also brought Curran representative honours. He scored on his Inter-League debut in a 5–1 defeat by the Football League in October 1925, and scored two on his first outing for Northern Ireland in a 3–0 win over Wales.

Over the next few seasons Curran could not stop scoring, as Belfast Celtic went on to claim four consecutive League titles, plus further successes in the City Cup and the County Antrim Shield. In 1928 he was chosen to lead the line as Northern Ireland faced France in Paris. Four days later he scored the only goal in a famously hard-fought win over Scotland in Glasgow.

Having scored over 170 goals for Celtic, Curran moved on to Derry City playing in their first match as a senior side on 22 August 1929. Two days later he had the honour of scoring the club's first senior hat-trick, as Derry came back from 5–1 down against Portadown, only to lose 6–5 to a late goal. Curran finished his first season at the Brandywell Stadium with 35 goals in 39 appearances.

In 1931 Curran moved closer to home, signing for Bangor. The club struggled during Curran's first season, finishing bottom of the Irish League, five points behind Glenavon. A personal highlight for Curran was his hat-trick back at the Brandywell, although the final score of Derry City 7, Bangor 4 no doubt took some of the gloss of the achievement. Ironically, Bangor had been the main rivals of Woodburn during their Intermediate League days. He scored for Woodburn in the 1923 Steel & Sons Cup Final against the Seasiders; Bangor won 2–0.

== Retirement ==
Curran settled in Bangor, where he bought a sweet shop.
