= Johnny Crossan =

Ex Pro Footballer

Personal information
- Full name: John Andrew Crossan
- Date of birth: 29 November 1938 (age 87)
- Place of birth: Derry, Northern Ireland
- Position: Inside forward

Senior career*
Years	Team	Apps	(Gls)
1954–1958	Derry City	?	(5)
1958	Coleraine	0	(0)
1958–1959	Bristol City	0	(0)
1959–1961	Sparta Rotterdam	20	(5)
1961–1962	Standard Liège	33	(6)
1962–1965	Sunderland	82	(39)
1965–1967	Manchester City	94	(24)
1967–1970	Middlesbrough	56	(7)
1970–1975	KSK Tongeren	108	(5)
Total		370 +	(80 +)

International career
1959	Northern Ireland B	1	(0)
1959–1967	Northern Ireland	24	(10)
- * Club domestic league appearances and goals

John Andrew Crossan (born 29 November 1938) is a Northern Irish author, radio sports analyst, entrepreneur, and former footballer. His brother Eddie was also a player.

== Club career ==
Crossan began his career playing for Derry City, where he played as an inside forward. His talent was spotted by several leading English clubs, including Arsenal and Sunderland. When the latter made a substantial offer, Derry City offered Crossan a payment deal which he rejected, offering his own. When the Sunderland negotiations broke down, Derry City dropped Crossan, who signed for Coleraine. Derry City, still aggrieved by Crossan's actions, reported themselves to the Football League authorities for technical breaches of regulations, thus ensuring that Crossan would face disciplinary action.

In January 1959, a commission of inquiry imposed small fines on Derry and Coleraine, but banned Crossan from all forms of football for life. A partial lifting of the ban was allowed following an appeal, in May 1959 the inside forward signed for Dutch Champions Sparta Rotterdam, where he was first called up to the Northern Ireland squad.

Crossan went from there to Standard Liège, where he played in the semi-final of the European Cup against Real Madrid. In 1963, Crossan returned to football in the UK (following the lifting of his 'life-time' ban) when he was signed by Sunderland, with whom he made it to the First Division. He then signed for Manchester City who were playing in the Second Division. As team captain, he helped them make their way into the First Division, before being sold to Middlesbrough after a loss of form following a car crash and other health problems.

== International career ==
Internationally, he was capped 24 times by Northern Ireland and scored 10 goals.

=== International goals ===
Scores and results list Northern Ireland's goal tally first.

#	Date	Venue	Opponent	Result	Competition
1	28 November 1961	Belfast, Northern Ireland	Poland	2–0	UEFA Euro 1964 qualifying
2	20 November 1963	London, England	England	3–8	1964 British Home Championship
3	29 April 1964	Belfast, Northern Ireland	Uruguay	3–0	Friendly match
4	29 April 1964	Belfast, Northern Ireland	Uruguay	3–0	Friendly match
5	14 October 1964	Belfast, Northern Ireland	Switzerland	1–0	1966 FIFA World Cup qualification
6	17 March 1965	Belfast, Northern Ireland	Netherlands	2–1	1966 FIFA World Cup qualification
7	7 May 1965	Belfast, Northern Ireland	Albania	4–1	1966 FIFA World Cup qualification
8	7 May 1965	Belfast, Northern Ireland	Albania	4–1	1966 FIFA World Cup qualification
9	7 May 1965	Belfast, Northern Ireland	Albania	4–1	1966 FIFA World Cup qualification
10	2 October 1965	Belfast, Northern Ireland	Scotland	3–2	1966 British Home Championship

== Management ==
After his playing days, Crossan had a spell in management and took the top job at League of Ireland club, Sligo Rovers. He resigned soon after.

== Media career ==
He also commentates for BBC Radio Foyle when they cover Derry City games.
