= 2011 League of Ireland Cup =

EA Sports Cup

Tournament details
- Country: Ireland; Northern Ireland
- Teams: 27

Final positions
- Champions: Derry City (10th title)
- Runners-up: Cork City

Tournament statistics
- Matches played: 26
- Goals scored: 85 (3.27 per match)
- Top goal scorer(s): Jeffrey Judge; Stephen McLaughlin; Eoin Doyle (3 goals)

The 2011 League of Ireland Cup, also known as the 2011 EA Sports Cup, was the 38th season of the League of Ireland Cup knockout competition.

The competition was won by Derry City who defeated Cork City in the final on 24 September 2011 in Turners Cross.

A total of 27 teams entered the 2011 competition. The ten Premier Division and eleven First Division clubs were joined by four A Championship teams plus the 2010 Ulster Senior League champions, Cockhill Celtic and the Kerry District League representative side. For the Preliminary, First and Second Rounds of the competition, all participating clubs were split into 4 regional pools with the further rounds of the competition having an open draw. Shamrock Rovers, Sligo Rovers, Bohemians and St. Patrick's Athletic all received automatic byes into the second round of the competition due to each club's European football participation. The 2011 competition commenced with the preliminary round in March 2011.

== Teams ==
Pool 1	Pool 2	Pool 3	Pool 4
Cobh Ramblers; Cork City; Kerry District League; Limerick; Tralee Dynamos; Waterford United; Wexford Youths	Cockhill Celtic; Derry City; Fanad United; Finn Harps; Galway United; Mervue United; Salthill Devon; Sligo Rovers	Athlone Town; Bray Wanderers; Drogheda United; Longford Town; Shamrock Rovers; St. Patrick's Athletic; UCD	Bohemians; Dundalk; FC Carlow; Monaghan United; Shelbourne

== Preliminary round ==
The draw for the preliminary round took place on 2 March 2011.

The Preliminary Round games were played on 14 March 2011.

Pool 2
Tie no	Home team	Score^{1}	Away team	Attendance
1	Salthill Devon	2 – 0	Fanad United	—N/a

Pool 3
Tie no	Home team	Score^{1}	Away team	Attendance
1	Longford Town	2 – 1	Athlone Town	—N/a

== First round ==
The draw for the first round took place on 2 March 2011.

The First round Games were played on 25 March, 28 March and 30 March 2011.

=== Pool 1 ===
Tie no	Home team	Score	Away team	Report
1	Cobh Ramblers	1–3	Wexford Youths	
2	Kerry District League	0–1	Limerick	Report
3	Tralee Dynamos	0–4	Waterford United	Report

=== Pool 2 ===
Tie no	Home team	Score	Away team	Report
1	Galway United	1–3	Cockhill Celtic	Report
2	Mervue United	1–0; AET	Finn Harps	Report
3	Salthill Devon	2–4; AET	Derry City	Report

=== Pool 3 ===
Tie no	Home team	Score	Away team	Report
1	Bray Wanderers	0–1	Drogheda United	Report
2	Longford Town	2–3	UCD	Report

=== Pool 4 ===
Tie no	Home team	Score	Away team	Report
1	FC Carlow	0–4	Shelbourne	Report

== Second round ==
The draw for the second round took place on 30 March 2011.

The Second Round games were played on 25 April 2011.

=== Pool 1 ===
Tie no	Home team	Score	Away team	Report
1	Limerick	1–0	Waterford United	Report
2	Wexford Youths	0–1	Cork City	Report

=== Pool 2 ===
Tie no	Home team	Score	Away team	Report
1	Cockhill Celtic	0–4	Sligo Rovers	
2	Derry City	2–1	Mervue United	

=== Pool 3 ===
Tie no	Home team	Score	Away team	Report
1	Drogheda United	2–3	UCD	
2	St Patrick's Athletic	1–1; AET	Shamrock Rovers	Report
St Patrick's Athletic Athletic won 3 – 1 on penalties

=== Pool 4 ===
Tie no	Home team	Score	Away team	Report
1	Monaghan United	2–1; AET	Dundalk	Report
2	Shelbourne	4–2	Bohemians	Report

== Quarterfinals ==
The draw for the Quarterfinals was made on 2 May 2011 on MNS on RTÉ Two.

The Quarterfinal games were played on 06/27/28 June 2011.

Tie No	Home team	Score	Away team	Report
1	Shelbourne	1–2	Sligo Rovers	
2	Limerick	5–0	Monaghan United	
3	Cork City	2–1	St Patrick's Athletic	Report
4	UCD	0–3	Derry City	

== Semi−Finals ==
The Semifinal games were played on the 8/23 August 2011.

Tie No	Home team	Score	Away team	Report
1	Cork City	3–1; AET	Limerick	Report
2	Derry City	3–3; AET	Sligo Rovers	Report
Derry City won 5 – 3 on penalties

== Final ==
The final was played on Saturday 24 September 2011 in Turners Cross, Cork.

Team 1	Score	Team 2
Cork City	0–1	Derry City

=== Match ===
24 September 2011
18.00 IST

Cork City	0–1	Derry City
	Report	Zayed 66' (pen.); Shane McEleney (red card) 92'

Turners Cross, Cork
Attendance: 4,164
Referee: Paul Tuite (Dublin)
