= Charlie McGeever =

Irish Gaelic and association football player

Personal information
- Date of birth: 1961
- Position: Defender

Youth career
- 197?–1979: Fanad United

Senior career*
Years	Team	Apps	(Gls)
1979–1984	Sligo Rovers		
- Finn Harps
- Fanad United
- Finn Harps
- Bonagee United

Managerial career
- 1984–1985: Finn Harps (caretaker manager)
- 1995–1996: Finn Harps (caretaker manager)
- 199?–1999 or 2000: Finn Harps
- 200?–: Clonmel Town
- * Club domestic league appearances and goals

Charlie McGeever
Personal information
- Native name: Charlie Mac Íomhair (Irish)
- Born: 1961
- Occupation: Secondary school teacher

Sport
- Sport: Gaelic football
- Position: Full-forward
Club
- Years: Club
- 19??–?: Cloich Cheann Fhaola
Inter-county
- Years: County
- 19??–1982 1990: Donegal; Donegal
Club management
- Years: Club
- Clonmel Commercials
Inter-county management
- Years: Team
- 2012–2015: Tipperary

Charles McGeever (born between 27 April and 22 December 1961) (Note: The 1981 FAI Cup Final was played on 26 April, when McGeever was 19. McGeever took over as caretaker manager of Finn Harps at the age of 24 "three days before Christmas" in 1984. Source) is an Irish sportsperson from County Donegal. He played association football as a defender for Fanad United and in the League of Ireland for Sligo Rovers and Finn Harps. He played Gaelic football in midfield for Donegal, for which he also captained. He has had success while managing Finn Harps, as well as the Clonmel Commercials GAA club and the Tipperary county team.

== Early life ==
McGeever is a native of Derryconnor, in the Cloughaneely region of Donegal in north-west Ireland. He first discovered association football in the village hall in Gortahork, where he was a spectator at parish league games, and began playing the sport when he was around 11 years of age. He credits Fr Michael ("Mick") Sweeney, whom he first encountered at secondary school in 1974, with influencing his interest in association football. Around the same time, another teacher — Fr Sean Gallagher — stimulated McGeever's interest in Gaelic football. The school won the under-14 county title and the under-16 national title against Summerhill. McGeever later attended Thomond College of Education, Limerick.

== Playing and management career ==
McGeever won the 1979 FAI Youth Cup with Fanad United, when the team unexpectedly defeated Shelbourne 3–1 in the final. Following on from this victory Patsy McGowan signed McGeever for Sligo Rovers. McGeever was in the bog in West Donegal when, he later said: "There was Patsy McGowan coming towards me, dapper dressed as always and a form in his hand… I had to get out of a hole, wash my hands and sign the form". McGeever credits McGowan, alongside Fr Sweeney, Fr Gallagher and Seosamh Kelly, as being the most influential people on his sporting career. McGeever also received another offer after his encounter with McGowan in the bog: "Busty [Blake] spoke to me after that about going to [Finn] Harps, but I had already the form signed with Sligo. I was going to college in Limerick and the journey to Sligo was handier".

At the age of 19, McGeever played in the 1981 FAI Cup Final with Sligo Rovers, but his team were defeated by Dundalk. The same year he captained Donegal in midfield (alongside Denis Bonner, twin of Packie) against Monaghan in the final of the Ulster Under-21 Senior Football Championship, but his team were defeated by two points. He was part of a group of seven, including Pauric Gallagher (the driver), Jimmy Kennedy, Michael McBrearty, Michael McGeehin, Donnacha Mac Niallais and Seamus Meehan, who made their way back and forth from Thomond College for games and training sessions.

McGeever's career progressed to the extent that the English professional club Tottenham Hotspur invited him to train with their team in the summer of 1982 shortly after their FA Cup win. However, after only two weeks in London (where he trained under manager Keith Burkinshaw with 1978 FIFA World Cup winners Ossie Ardiles and Ricky Villa, as well as Glenn Hoddle, all three of whom were late back to their club as they had been playing in that summer's World Cup), McGeever returned to Ireland and injured one of his cruciate ligaments in a Gaelic football match in which he was not supposed to be playing. He had only returned from London for two nights when he heard that Seosamh Kelly was organising a Cloich Cheann Fhaola team to play a match against St Michael's at the Burn Road in Termon, and — ignoring his mother's advice to rest — off he went. McGeever then made matters worse by carrying on and, while contesting a header in the opening minutes of that season's first league game against Bohemians, "came down and the knee buckled under me" as he put it in a 2012 interview with the Sunday Independent. He said in 2020: "At that time, no-one knew anything about cruciate ligaments". McGeever returned to England to have surgery performed upon him by a Professor Dandy. He would wear a bandage for the rest of his playing career and had a knee replacement in around 2013. Meanwhile, a now McGeeverless Tottenham went on to collect the 1983–84 UEFA Cup.

The injury left McGeever on the sidelines for one year, a crucial year, as his team Sligo Rovers won the 1983 FAI Cup Final without him. To make matters worse, the Donegal football team of which he had been captain the previous year had claimed the 1983 All-Ireland Football Championship title, also without McGeever. Sligo Rovers released McGeever in 1984. He then signed for Finn Harps (managed at the time by Bobby Toland after Patsy McGowan was sacked), scoring a goal on his debut against Drogheda United. He turned to coaching at Finn Harps and became caretaker manager of the club in December 1984, a role he filled for four months. While in the United States in the middle of 1985, Harps appointed Tommy McConville as manager without informing McGeever. He decided to return to the field, "playing on one leg basically for about 10 years", he told the Sunday Independent in 2012.

As a consequence of his injury, McGeever missed out on Donegal's 1992 All-Ireland Senior Football Championship Final victory, again watching on as many of his former teammates achieved the pinnacle of the sport of Gaelic football. Donegal manager Brian McEniff had invited him to train with the county team in 1990 on the back of McGeever's performances alongside Con McLaughlin in the Cloich Cheann Fhaola full-forward line. McGeever said: "Out of respect for Brian I went up and gave it a month. I was nowhere near it and, in fairness, I have no regrets about not being in the squad of '92. I gave it a go at training and was well off it".

McGeever restarted his playing career at Fanad United, with whom he won the 1987–88 FAI Intermediate Cup by defeating Tramore Athletic 1–0 in the final at Dalymount Park. Patsy McGowan — who resumed management of Finn Harps in June 1992 — signed McGeever as a player. When Harps sacked McGowan for the fifth and final time in December 1995, McGeever again took over as caretaker manager for a three-month spell until Dermot Keely arrived in late February 1996. McGeever selected the team for one game after Keely's appointment, a league match against Monaghan United in March 1996. After Keely departed, McGeever became manager of Harps, this time on a permanent basis. As manager he brought Finn Harps to the 1997–98 FAI Cup semi-final and to the 1999 FAI Cup Final against Bray Wanderers, where three games were required to separate the sides, ultimately in Bray's favour. In the second of these games, said McGeever in 2012, "[W]e were a goal up and 30 seconds left. Then we conceded a penalty, our 'keeper saved it, but they got to the rebound first".

After Harps lost six games from the first seven in the 1999–2000 League of Ireland Premier Division, McGeever resigned as manager. He signed for Bonagee United. But McGeever admitted he was an "absentee father". His wife suggested they move to Clonmel, the town in County Tipperary from which she came, and which is located in Munster, the southernmost province on the island. After a brief lull, McGeever adapted to the move from the north-west by taking on the role of managing the local association football club Clonmel Town. With Clonmel Town he won six consecutive leagues and reached the semi-final of the 2011 FAI Junior Cup. McGeever also became involved with the town's GAA club, Clonmel Commercials, managing them at under-21 and senior levels. His involvement with Clonmel Commercials was encouraged by referee Brian White and McGeever's son Cathal was also playing for the club. Seven players from the club were involved when Tipperary won the 2011 All-Ireland Minor Football Championship. McGeever led Clonmel Commercials to the final of the 2012 Tipperary Senior Football Championship. He took charge of the Tipperary minor football team on an initial two-year term (later extended to a third year). In his first year in charge Kerry defeated Tipperary, captained by the future professional Australian rules footballer Colin O'Riordan, in the Munster Football Championship, while Monaghan defeated them in the All-Ireland Football Championship quarter-final. Kerry defeated Tipperary again in the Munster Football Championship in McGeever's second year in charge. In his third year in charge McGeever took Tipperary all the way to the final of the All-Ireland Football Championship, though they lost, again to Kerry. He led Clonmel Commercials to the 2015 Tipperary Senior Football Championship, the 2015 Munster Senior Football Championship, and — later — to the 2017 Tipperary Senior Football Championship.

In 2019, McGeever was named as a selector for the Tipperary senior football team when David Power was appointed manager following the resignation of Liam Kearns, with long-term McGeever ally McGeehin named as head coach. Tipperary qualified for, and then won, the 2020 Munster Senior Football Championship Final, defeating Cork at Páirc Uí Chaoimh. The team advanced to the semi-final of the 2020 All-Ireland Senior Football Championship.

== Television work ==
McGeever has commentated for and provided analysis for TG4's Irish language coverage of association football and Gaelic football, often mixing references to the two sports.

== Personal life ==
McGeever taught for a time at St Eunan's College in Letterkenny. He also taught at Pobalscoil Chloich Cheann Fhaola. After moving to Tipperary, he became principal of Gaelcholáiste Chéitinn in Clonmel. He retired in 2018 and took a job overseeing placement (with "a small bit of lecturing") at Mary Immaculate College in Thurles. While based in the south of Ireland during the school year, McGeever maintains contact with Ollie Horgan, a former colleague at St Eunan's College who had managed Fanad United and, following McGeever's move to Clonmel, went on to also manage Finn Harps.

McGeever is married to Fionnuala, with whom he has two sons and a daughter. One son played on the Clonmel Commercials minor football team, while the other is a golfer and the daughter is a camogie player at county level. The son later played for the Clonmel Commercials senior team.

== Honours ==
=== Player ===
Fanad United

- FAI Intermediate Cup: 1987–88
- FAI Youth Cup: 1979

=== Manager ===
Clonmel Commercials

- Tipperary Senior Football Championship: 2015, 2017, 2019, 2020

== Notes ==
Sporting positions
Preceded by David Power	Tipperary Minor Football Manager; 2012–2015	Succeeded by Tommy Toomey
