= Ollie Horgan =

Irish football manager (1968–2025)

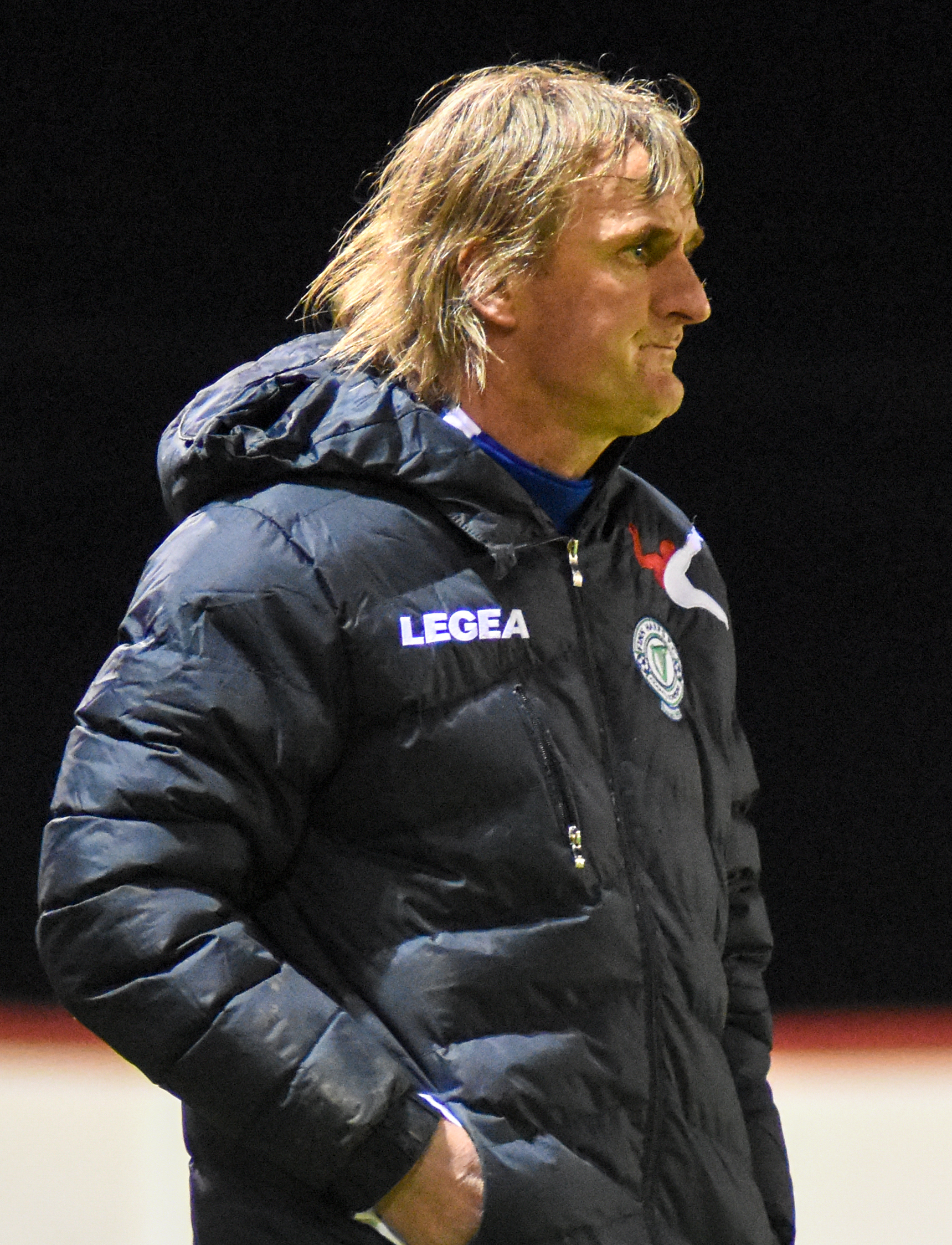
- Horgan in 2016

Personal information
- Date of birth: 17 February 1968
- Place of birth: Salthill, County Galway, Ireland
- Date of death: 28 August 2025 (aged 57)

Managerial career
- Years: Team
- 2004–2013: Fanad United
- 2012–2016: Republic of Ireland schoolboys
- 2013–2022: Finn Harps
- 2022–2025: Galway United (assistant manager)

Oliver Horgan (17 February 1968 – 28 August 2025) was an Irish football manager. He was the manager of Finn Harps from November 2013 to November 2022. Horgan previously managed the Republic of Ireland national schoolboy football team and was assistant manager at Galway United.

== Early life ==
A native of Salthill, Horgan played for Salthill Devon before moving to County Donegal in 1989 to teach in St. Eunan's College. Upon his arrival in Fanad, Horgan was met by Fr. Michael Sweeney, founder of Fanad United, who recruited him for the team. Sweeney recalled meeting Horgan at the Letterkenny bus station:

"I was talking to Art Friel, a cousin of mine who's a guard down in Galway. He told me there was a young fella going up to teach in St Eunan’s College. I was in Letterkenny waiting on him to get off the bus.
I went over to him: 'You’re not Ollie Horgan?' I signed him up there and then."

After joining Fanad United as a player, he won the Ulster Senior League as well as the FAI Intermediate Cup in 1995.

== Managerial career ==
=== Fanad United ===
Horgan started his managerial career with Fanad United in 2004 when he succeeded Eamon McConigley. He led the club to three Ulster Senior League titles in 2005–06, 2006–07 and 2011. Horgan also won the Ulster Senior League Cup with Fanad in 2008 and 2011. During Horgan's tenure, the club qualified for the 2007 FAI Cup, making it to the last sixteen. When Fanad entered a team into the League of Ireland's under-19 division, Horgan became manager of the side for the inaugural 2011 season and remained in charge until he departed to join Finn Harps in 2013. From 2009, Horgan was also involved in the Republic of Ireland under-18 FAI Schools team, initially as an assistant manager, then manager and finally as a coach.

=== Finn Harps ===
On 26 November 2013, Horgan succeeded Peter Hutton as Finn Harps' new manager for the 2014 season. Horgan's appointment came as a surprise, with more high-profile candidates such as Joe Boyle, Don O'Riordan and Julian Dicks all confirmed to have been interested in the job.

In his first season as a League of Ireland manager, Horgan spent the year consolidating and ensuring Harps would build on a youthful squad. After a good start to the season, Harps ended the year in fifth position, seventeen points away from a play-off place. Despite the lack of success in the league, Horgan led Harps to a first FAI Cup semi-final appearance since an ill-fated run to the 1999 FAI Cup Final. Harps were drawn away to St Patrick's Athletic in Richmond Park. However, the game didn't go according to plan, and underdogs Harps suffered a heavy 6–1 defeat against their opponents in front of the RTÉ cameras.

The 2015 season, however, proved to be much more successful for Horgan's Harps. A positive start saw his team unbeaten in the first twelve matches, ending by a narrow 1–0 defeat away to Athlone Town on 5 June. However, Harps recovered from this and reached the end of season play-off, where they beat UCD over two legs in the First Division play-off to set up a play-off final date with Limerick, who finished in 11th place in the League of Ireland Premier Division. Harps came from a goal behind in the first leg tie in Markets Field to win dramatically at Finn Park via a last minute BJ Banda winner, thus sending Horgan into Harps folklore by going from First Division also-rans to a Premier Division side on one of the lowest budgets in the club's history in the space of two seasons.

In October 2016, Finn Harps extended Horgan's contract as senior team manager until the end of 2017.

Despite a promising start to the 2017 season, with wins over St Patrick's Athletic twice, Limerick, Bohemians, and a derby game in Maginn Park over Derry City, Harps late season run of form ended with relegation back to the First Division for 2018 alongside Galway United and Drogheda United as the Football Association of Ireland changed structures again, relegating three teams from twelve to create two ten team divisions within the League of Ireland.

A period of uncertainty followed surrounding Horgan's future as Harps manager. Still, with issues resolved between the board and manager, Horgan signed a new two-year deal with an option of an extra year, with his first challenge assembling a squad that can compete for promotion in 2018.

The 2018 season saw Finn Harps finish in second place and beat Drogheda United to qualify for the promotion/relegation playoff. Limerick were again the opposition, and Harps secured promotion to the Premier Division, winning both legs of the playoff and holding Limerick scoreless. In the 2019 League of Ireland Premier Division Finn Harps finished in 9th place, qualifying for the relegation playoff in which they faced Drogheda United. Following a 1–0 defeat at United Park, Finn Harps completed a successful comeback to survive relegation from the Premier Division. In a dramatic game which went to extra time, Harps beat Drogheda 2–0 at Finn Park with a 107th-minute goal by Harry Ascroft.

In the 2020 League of Ireland Premier Division, Finn Harps finished in 8th place, avoiding the relegation play-offs by one point. COVID-19 disrupted the season, so teams played half the number of games — 18 instead of the usual 36. The club's bid to avoid relegation went down to the final day, with a 1–0 victory against Waterford securing their status in the Premier Division over Shelbourne, who finished 9th and lost their play-off to Longford Town. Finn Harps started the 2021 League of Ireland Premier Division season well, and found themselves in first place for periods. However, their late season form saw them drop off the pace with the threat of the relegation play-off looming. On the final day of the season, they beat Longford 5–0 and retained their Premier Division status for the 2022 season.

Following relegation from the Premier Division the following season, it was announced in November 2022 that Horgan had left the club by mutual consent, after nine years at Finn Park.

=== Galway United (Assistant Manager) ===
On 14 December 2022, Horgan was appointed assistant manager to John Caulfield at First Division club Galway United, returning to his hometown. On 9 August 2025, Horgan departed the club.

== Personal life and death ==
Horgan was a schoolteacher by profession, working as a maths teacher at St Eunan's College in Letterkenny. He also taught physical education classes at St Eunan's. A pianist, originally from Galway, he was interested in Bach and Beethoven.

Horgan died on 28 August 2025, after a battle with cancer, at the age of 57. Upon his death, President of Ireland Michael D. Higgins paid tribute to Horgan.

It is with great sadness that I have learnt of the death of Ollie Horgan. Ollie was one of the most respected and popular people in the League of Ireland. He will be warmly remembered for his wonderful management and intense passion for the game, in particular during his near decade-long spell as manager of Finn Harps. More recently Ollie has played a key role, working as assistant to John Caulfield, in the successful recent seasons of Galway United, only leaving his role in recent weeks due to the health challenges he was facing. He will be deeply missed by the whole League of Ireland community. May I express my deepest sympathy and condolences to Ollie's wife Anita, his children Emma, Anthony, Brendan, Conor and David, to all of his family who have made such an extraordinary contribution to the game, and to all of his players, colleagues, friends and fans throughout the country.

— Michael D. Higgins, Irish Independent

Nationwide tributes were paid and President Higgins attended Horgan's funeral.

== Managerial statistics ==
As of 6 November 2022 (UTC)

Team	Nat	From	To	Record				
Team	Nat	From	To	G	W	D	L	Win %
Finn Harps^{1}	(Republic of Ireland)	November 2013	9 November 2022	354	113	82	159	31.92
Total				354	113	82	159	31.92

- 1.Includes all competitions.

== Honours ==
=== Manager ===
Fanad United

- Ulster Senior League (3)
  - Winners: 2005–06, 2011
