= Michael McGeehin =

Irish Gaelic football coach

Personal information
- Born: 1961/62
- Occupation: Coach

Sport
- Sport: Gaelic football
Club management
- Years: Club
- c. 1995 c. 2001 c. 2004 c. 2006 c. 2008–2009 c. 2012 c. 2015–2016 c. 2015–2016 c. 2015–2016: Convoy; Glenswilly; Seán MacCumhaill's; Éire Óg; St Eunan's; St Eunan's; Clonmel Commercials; Cratloe; Castlebar Mitchels
- 1
Inter-county management
- Years: Team
- 1992 1992 2008 200?–20?? 2012 201?–2015 2016–201? 2019–: Clare; Mayo; Limerick; Donegal; Limerick; Tipperary; Laois; Tipperary

Michael McGeehin (born 1961/62) is a Gaelic football trainer currently attached as head coach to Tipperary. He has previously worked with the Clare, Mayo, Fermanagh, Donegal, Limerick and Laois county teams (as well as numerous clubs), and the association football teams Fanad United and Finn Harps.

Among the honours he has helped the counties collect are a Munster Senior Football Championship, a Connacht Senior Football Championship, an All-Ireland B Championship and two National Football League Division 4 titles; with clubs he has won three Donegal Senior Football Championships and one Clare Senior Football Championship and reached the semi-finals of the All-Ireland Senior Club Football Championship.

From Letterkenny, McGeehin's home [GAA] club is St Eunan's. He works regularly with Charlie McGeever, who has described him as "my buddy since '82… We are like minded".

== Career ==
McGeehin was part of a group of seven (the others being Pauric Gallagher, Jimmy Kennedy, Michael McBrearty, Charlie McGeever, Donnacha Mac Niallais and Seamus Meehan) who would travel back and forth from Thomond College of Education, Limerick, to Donegal for games and training sessions in the early 1980s, with Gallagher as the driver. McGeehin is director of Coaching Ireland. He is based at UL.

McGeehin started his involvement coaching inter-county teams in 1992, juggling Clare and Mayo as both won their respective provincial championships.

He led Convoy to the 1995 Donegal Junior Football Championship. He coached the Donegal under-15, under-16 and minor teams around this time.

He was involved with the Fanad United team that won the 1996 FAI Intermediate Cup. He then spent two seasons with Finn Harps, working alongside McGeever and bringing the club as far as the 1999 FAI Cup Final.

McGeehin was part of John Maughan's team when Fermanagh won an All-Ireland Senior B Football Championship.

He coached Glenswilly to a Junior League title in 2001. He was involved with Seán MacCumhaill's when they reached the final of the 2004 Donegal Senior Football Championship.

With Éire Óg of Ennis, McGeehin won the 2006 Clare Senior Football Championship.

He worked under Mickey Ned O'Sullivan as Limerick manager and, later, under Maurice Horan.

He led St Eunan's to the 2008 and 2009 Donegal Senior Football Championships. This resulted in him becoming involved with the Donegal senior team during John Joe Doherty's time as manager. He briefly spent time with Limerick in 2012, as they won the National Football League Division 4 title. He then returned to St Eunan's to oversee their winning of the 2012 Donegal Senior Football Championship.

He worked with Tipperary until late-2015 under the management of Peter Creedon. He also led the Tipperary team to the final of the 2015 All-Ireland Under-21 Football Championship. He then spent a year away from inter-county coaching, though received numerous offers in that time. Meanwhile, on his brief spell away from inter-county, McGeehin reached the semi-finals of the 2015–16 All-Ireland Senior Club Football Championship with Clonmel Commercials and worked with the Cratloe and Castlebar Mitchels clubs. He worked with McGeever while at Clonmel Commercials. In 2016, he joined Laois when Creedon became manager of the county. In 2019, McGeehin was reappointed to Tipperary (again alongside McGeever) when David Power was appointed manager following the resignation of Liam Kearns.

== Honours ==
Clare

- Munster Senior Football Championship: 1992

Mayo

- Connacht Senior Football Championship: 1992

Convoy

- Donegal Junior Football Championship: 1995

Fanad United

- FAI Intermediate Cup: 1996

Finn Harps

- FAI Cup Final: 1999

Fermanagh

- All-Ireland Senior B Football Championship

Glenswilly

- Donegal JFL: 2001

Seán MacCumhaill's

- Donegal Senior Football Championship runner-up: 2004

Éire Óg

- Clare Senior Football Championship: 2006

St Eunan's

- Donegal Senior Football Championship: 2008, 2009, 2012

Donegal

- Dr McKenna Cup: 2009, 2010

Limerick

- National Football League Division 4: 2013

Tipperary

- National Football League Division 4: 2014
- All-Ireland Under-21 Football Championship runner-up: 2015

Clonmel Commercials

- All-Ireland Senior Club Football Championship semi-finalist: 2015–16
