= Caretaker manager =

Coach temporary in charge of a team

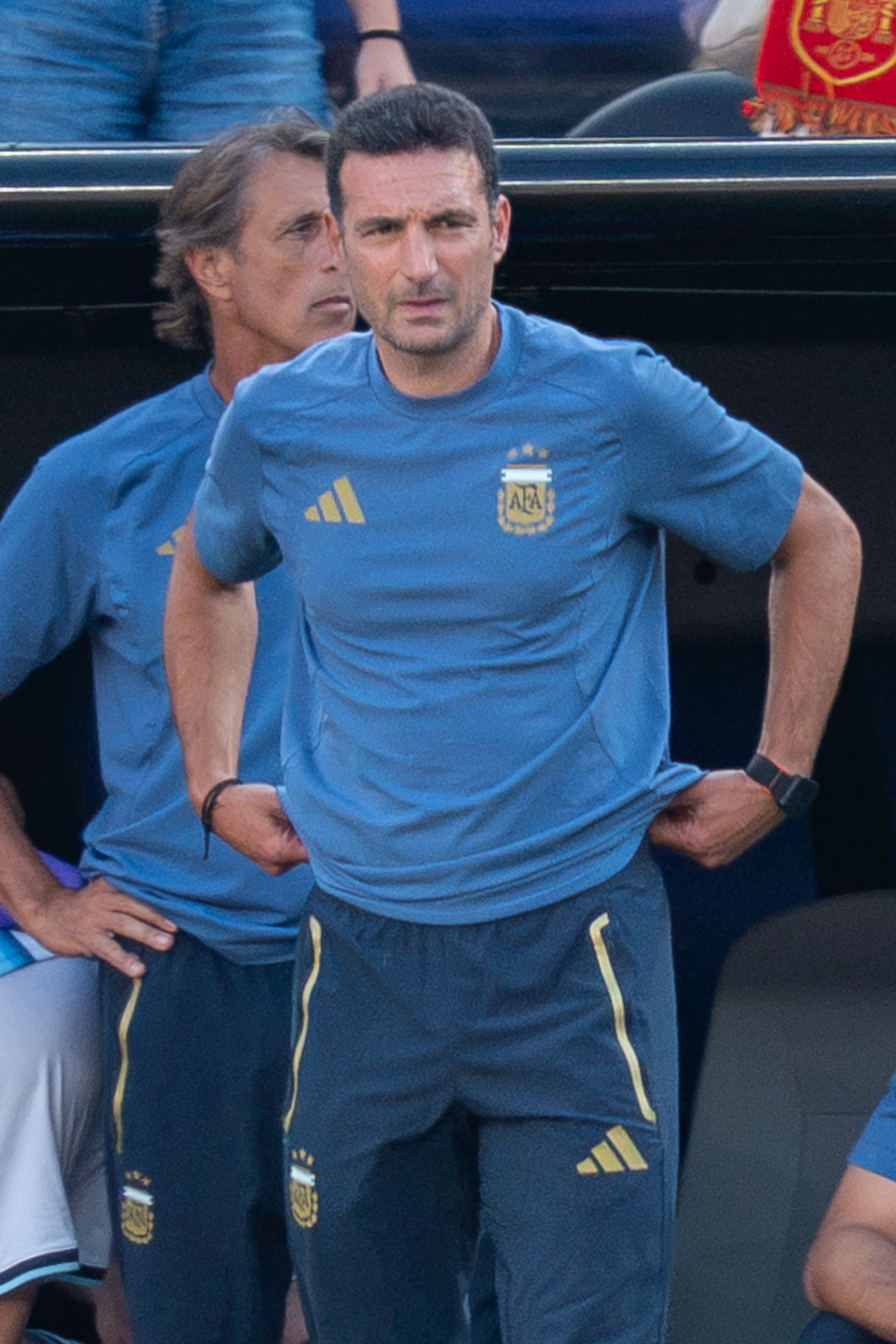
Lionel Scaloni served as the interim manager of the Argentina national team in 2018, following the resignation of Jorge Sampaoli. He was eventually promoted to permanent manager.

In association football, a caretaker manager or interim manager is somebody who takes temporary charge of the management of a football team, usually when the regular manager is dismissed or leaves for a different club. However, a caretaker manager may also be appointed if the regular manager is suspended, ill, has a suspected contagious disease (e.g. COVID-19) or is unable to attend to their usual duties. Caretaker managers are normally appointed at short notice from within the club, usually the assistant manager, a senior coach, or an experienced player.

== Permanent appointments ==
In Ireland, Charlie McGeever was twice appointed caretaker manager of Finn Harps in separate decades (1984–85 and 1995–96) before being given the job on a permanent basis. As permanent manager he led the club to the 1999 FAI Cup Final, which they narrowly lost to an injury time penalty rebound after a three-match marathon.

In Italy, after Juventus fired Claudio Ranieri following a string of seven league games without a win in the 2008–09 season, Ciro Ferrara was named caretaker head coach of Juventus on 18 May 2009 for the remaining two weeks of the season, with the goal of maintaining second place in the league table, and the possibility of being appointed on a full-time basis for a longer period. In his two games as caretaker coach, he led Juventus to 3–0 and 2–0 wins over Siena and Lazio respectively, thus ensuring a second-place finish over rivals Milan. Following these results, on 5 June 2009, Juventus formally announced his appointment as head coach for the 2009–10 season.

In the 2011–12 season, Inter sacked Claudio Ranieri as head coach and Andrea Stramaccioni was promoted to the first team as caretaker coach, He led Inter to sixth place and a success in the Derby della Madonnina against Milan that cost Inter's crosstown rivals the Serie A title; his results led club owner Massimo Moratti to confirm him as head coach for the 2012–13 season, as well. The FIGC allowed Stramaccioni to sign the contract without a UEFA Pro Licence as he was admitted to 2012–13 coaching course in order to obtain the licence in June 2013. On 7 October 2012, Stramaccioni guided Inter to a 1–0 victory over Milan, On 3 November 2012, Stramaccioni guided Inter to a 3–1 away victory over the previous season's champions, Juventus. After 14 months in charge of Inter and a difficult 2012–13 Serie A campaign which saw them finish in 9th place and thus fail to qualify for Europe for the first time in 15 seasons, the club announced on 24 May 2013 that Stramaccioni had been sacked and replaced by Walter Mazzarri.

In Germany, On 3 November 2019, Niko Kovač left Bayern Munich by mutual consent after a 5–1 loss to Eintracht Frankfurt, his assistant Hansi Flick, promoted as interim coach. In his first match in charge, Bayern defeated Olympiakos 2–0 in the UEFA Champions League group stage on 6 November 2019. In April 2020, Bayern Munich appointed Flick as permanent coach with a contract until 2023. Flick successfully guided Bayern to win the Bundesliga, DFB-Pokal and UEFA Champions League, thus completing the continental treble for the second time in the club's history, the following season, he led Bayern to win the 2020 UEFA Super Cup against Sevilla. He also led Bayern to win its first ever sextuple after winning Club World Cup in February 2021 by defeating Mexican team Tigres.

== Notable successes ==
In November 2007, Sandy Stewart led St Johnstone to victory in the final of the Scottish Challenge Cup in his only game in charge as caretaker manager.

Guus Hiddink was caretaker manager of Chelsea in 2009, leading his team to the UEFA Champions League semi-final, where they shut out FC Barcelona at Camp Nou and tied them back at Stamford Bridge. The latter was later said to be a very controversial game, particularly in decisions made by the referee Tom Henning Øvrebø. Chelsea would be later eliminated on away goals. He finished off his tenure with the team as they won the FA Cup. The club was reported happy to have Hiddink as manager even on a temporary basis.

Roberto Di Matteo won the Champions League and FA Cup as caretaker manager of Chelsea in 2012, leading to him being appointed permanent manager on a two-year contract. He was sacked a few months into the new season, being replaced by interim manager, Rafael Benítez, who led his team to victory in the Europa League, as well as guiding the team to a third-place finish in the league, thus ensuring direct qualification for next year's Champions League. Benítez was not offered a contract as permanent manager, instead being replaced by José Mourinho who went back to Chelsea for a second term.

In September 2016, after Sam Allardyce resigned as England manager after allegations of malpractice, England under-21s manager Gareth Southgate was installed as interim manager for a period of four games. Southgate was appointed as England manager permanently at the end of that period, and went on to lead the Three Lions to a 4th place finish at the 2018 World Cup and consecutive runners-up placings at the 2020 and 2024 editions of the European Championships.

== See also ==
- Head coach
