= Inishowen Football League =

Football League

- Association: Ulster Football Association
- Sport: Football
- Founded: 1970
- No. of teams: 17
- Country: (Republic of Ireland) Ireland
- Most recent champion: Cockhill Celtic (2025–26)
- Website: www.inishowenfl.ie

The Inishowen Football League (IOFL) is an amateur league for football clubs in the Inishowen peninsula of County Donegal, Ireland. There are four divisions, with a promotion and relegation system in operation. This four-division setup, introduced in 2026, replaced a three division structure that had been in place for ten years.

Its top division, the Premier Division, sits on the seventh level of the Republic of Ireland football league system.

The season runs from late August to May. The league is featured in much of Inishowen's media, such as the Inish Times and the Inishowen Independent.

The current champions are Cockhill Celtic who won the 2025–26 Premier Division season.

Cockhill Celtic first team have now been promoted to the newly formed third tier in the Irish football league system known as the FAI National League as of 2026.

== History ==
The Inishowen Football League was formed in 1988 with people representing their towns to play in small tournaments and the main league itself. Records of clubs achievements indicate that the league was up and running by the 1981–82 season, if not earlier. The league itself gave a founding date when celebrating its 50th anniversary, claiming the league began in 1970.

The Ulster Football Association passed a resolution in 2004 that defined the league's boundaries to be the same as the boundaries of the Inishowen Electoral Area. The rest of County Donegal falls under the jurisdiction of the Donegal League Organisation.

The Ulster Senior League folded after the conclusion of the 2022–23 season and the sole remaining Inishowen club, Cockhill Celtic, returned to junior football in the Inishowen league.

== League pyramid ==
Beginning with the 2025–26 season, the Inishowen Football League's promotion and relegation rules dictate that the team finishing bottom of the Premier Division is relegated to the First Division and the winners of the First Division are promoted in their place. Previously, there was a play-off match between the Premier and First Divisions but this was abolished for the 2025–26 season.

No club may have two teams participating in the Premier Division nor are reserve teams eligible for promotion to the Premier Division. If a reserve team wins the First Division, the runners-up are promoted in their stead. If the runners-up are also a reserve team, then there will be no promotion or relegation for that season. In 2023–24, a promotion relegation playoff was introduced between the Second Division runners-up and the team finishing second from bottom in the First Division.

County Level	League(s) / division(s)
1	IOFL Premier Division 9 clubs – 0 or 1 relegation
2	IOFL First Division 9 clubs – 0 or 1 promotion, 1 or 2 relegations
3	IOFL Second Division 8 clubs – 1 or 2 promotions, 1 relegation
4	IOFL Third Division 8 clubs – 1 promotion

== Clubs ==
Club	Founded	Team colours	Ground
Aileach F.C.	1993	Yellow & Blue	Lakeside, Inch Road, Burnfoot
Buncrana Hearts F.C.	1961	Blue	Castle Park, Buncrana
Carndonagh F.C.	1976	Red	St. Patrick's Park, Carndonagh
Carrowmena F.C.	1993	Red & Blue	The Warren, Tremone, Carrowmenagh
Clonmany Shamrocks F.C.	1951	White & Green	Shamrock Park, Clonmany
Cockhill Celtic F.C.	1970	Green & White Hoops	Charlie O'Donnell Sports Grounds
Culdaff F.C.	1972	White & Red	Caratra Park, Culdaff
Dunree United F.C.	1974	Black & Yellow	St. Egney's Park, Glebe, Dunree
Gleneely Colts F.C.	1980	Blue & Yellow	Glenview Park, Gleneely
Glengad United F.C.	1976	Yellow & Black	The Crua, Glengad
Greencastle F.C.	1986	Blue	Chapel Lane, Ballybrack, Greencastle
Illies Celtic F.C.	1977	Red	Druminderry, Illies
Moville Celtic F.C.	1904	Green & White Hoops	Glencrow, Moville
Quigley's Point Swifts F.C.	1970	Dark Blue	School Field, Muff
Rashenny F.C.	1976	Blue	Trawbreaga Park, Isle of Doagh
Redcastle United F.C.	1969	Red & Black Stripes	Foyle Park, Tullyally, Redcastle
Sea Rovers F.C.	1931	Red & White Stripes	Gortnamullin, Malin Head

Inishowen Football League Teams

== League format ==
The league is split up into four divisions. The Jackie Crossan Premier Division, the HML Plant Hire First Division, the Second Division & Third Division. The divisions function with a promotion-and-relegation system.

=== Teams for the 2026-27 season ===
==== Jackie Crossan Premier Division ====
- Aileach
- Buncrana Hearts
- Carndonagh
- Clonmany Shamrocks
- Cockhill Celtic Youths
- Culdaff FC
- Greencastle
- Illies Celtic
- Quigleys Point Swifts

==== HML Plant Hire First Division ====
- Aileach Reserves
- Buncrana Reserves
- Carn Youths
- Cockhill Celtic Reserves
- Dunree United
- Glengad United
- Moville Celtic
- Redcastle United
- Sea Rovers

==== Inishowen Engineering Second Division ====
- Carrowmena
- Clonmany Reserves
- Cockhill Celtic Colts
- Culdaff Rovers
- Gleneely Colts
- Illies Celtic Reserves
- Quigleys Point Youths
- Rashenny

==== PD Plumbing Supplies Third Division ====
- Aileach Youths
- Carndonagh Reserves
- Culdaff Reserves
- Dunree United Reserves
- Glengad Reserves
- Moville Reserves
- Rashenny Reserves
- Redcastle United Reserves

== Honours ==
Club	Titles
Cockhill Celtic	7
Clonmany Shamrocks	6
Redcastle United	4
Glengad United	4
Illies Celtic	3
Quigley's Point Swifts	3
Aileach	2
Greencastle	2
Buncrana Hearts	2
Carndonagh	1
Culdaff	1
Moville Celtic	1
Newtown	1

=== Premier League winners ===
- 2025–26 - Cockhill Celtic
- 2024–25 - Buncrana Hearts
- 2023–24 - Cockhill Celtic
- 2022–23 - Buncrana Hearts
- 2021-22 - Greencastle
- 2020-21 - NO SEASON
- 2019–20 - Aileach
- 2018–19 - Greencastle
- 2017–18 - Glengad United
- 2016–17 - Glengad United
- 2015–16 - Glengad United
- 2014–15 - Glengad United
- 2013–14 - Carndonagh
- 2012–13 - Clonmany Shamrocks
- 2011–12 - Aileach
- 2010–11 - Clonmany Shamrocks
- 2009–10 - Redcastle United
- 2008–09 - Redcastle United
- 2007–08 - Clonmany Shamrocks
- 2006–07 - Redcastle United
- 2005–06 - Redcastle United
- 2004–05 - Cockhill Celtic
- 2003–04 - Illies Celtic
- 2002–03 - Illies Celtic
- 2001–02 - Clonmany Shamrocks
- 2000–01 - Clonmany Shamrocks
- 1999–2000 - Cockhill Celtic
- 1998–99 - Culdaff
- 1997–98 - Moville Celtic
- 1996–97 - Quigley's Point Swifts
- 1995–96 - Newtown
- 1994–95 - Clonmany Shamrocks
- 1993–94 - Quigley's Point Swifts
- 1992–93 - Quigley's Point Swifts
- 1991–92 - Cockhill Celtic
- 1990–91 - Cockhill Celtic
- 1989–90 - Illies Celtic
- 1988–89 - Cockhill Celtic

== Cup competitions ==
=== Clubman Shirts League Cup ===
This cup competition is fought out between the Premier League teams in a mini league and then knockout format. This competition begins prior to the start of the league and played out through the season.

=== Buncrana Credit Union Cup ===
This cup competition is played between teams from the Premier and First Divisions in a knockout format only.

=== Hannon Greene Father O'Gara Cup ===
The Father O'Gara Cup is renown and historic competition in the league. The format is every team from the First, Second & Third Divisions compete against one another in a knockout format. First teams and their reserve teams may compete against one another if they are drawn to play. Mainly it has been the First Division teams that make the final. The competition lasts all the way through the season and is very popular throughout the peninsula.

=== FAI Junior Cup ===
Teams from the Premier and First Divisions can take part in the FAI Junior Cup, which features 600-plus teams from around the country. Teams who do well in the Jackie Crossan Premier are invited to compete against other clubs from around Ulster.

== Players ==
A 2008/9 season game. Clonmany Shamrocks celebrate after scoring a goal

The players of the league consist of many people from around Inishowen. Players are free to join whichever team they want before the season starts. Players cannot switch teams during the regular season unless they request a transfer from the league. There have been a lot of local people that have a reputation for playing in the league. Most of these people stay in the league after their playing careers and move on to management of a club.

== Notable former players ==
- Stephen McLaughlin

== Football pitches ==
Facilities for football matches in the league have changed in recent years. Many parks now include clubhouses with changing rooms and showers, and some clubs have added second pitches and floodlights. Aileach F.C. has developed dual-purpose pitches, changing facilities, and an indoor artificial training surface.

For cup finals, or any other tournament the league is involved with, Maginn Park is where these games are held. Maginn Park also serves as the headquarters of the Inishowen Football League. The Inishowen League plays all their league finals and representative games at the Buncrana venue, while the Inishowen Ladies League and the Youth & Schoolboys' League also host all their finals at the ground.
