= Gleneely =

Village in County Donegal, Ireland

Coordinates: 55.2416°N 7.1490°W

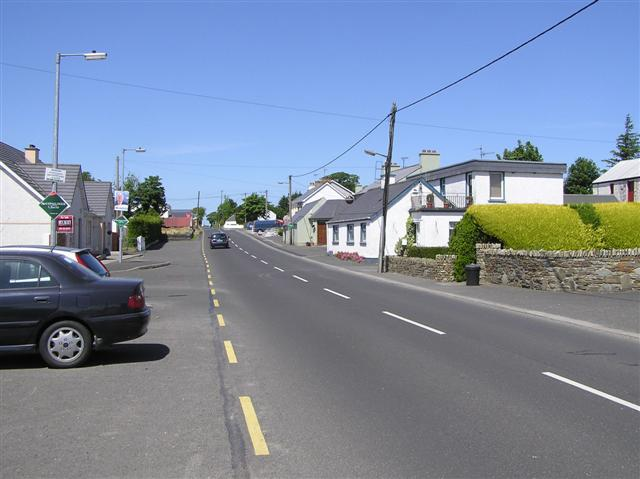
The R238 regional road passes through Gleneely

Gleneely (Irish: Gleann Daoile) is a village and census town on the Inishowen peninsula in the north of County Donegal in Ulster, Ireland. As of the 2016 census, the village had a population of 236 people (up from 166 as of the 2006 census).

Gleneely's Church of Ireland church, All Saints Church in Aghaglassan townland, was built in 1856. The nearest Catholic church, known locally as 'the Chapel', is in Culdaff parish. The local national (primary) school, Scoil Mhuire in Dristernan townland, had an enrollment of 125 pupils as of 2021.

Local sports clubs include the Gleneely Colts association football (soccer) club, which fields teams in the Inishowen Football League.
