= Eddie Fullerton =

Irish politician (1935–1991)

Donegal County Councillor
- In office 1979–1991
- Constituency: Buncrana

Personal details
- Born: 26 March 1935; Donegal, Ireland
- Died: 25 May 1991 (aged 56); Buncrana, Inishowen, County Donegal, Ireland
- Manner of death: Assassination
- Political party: Sinn Féin
- Spouse: Dinah Peach
- Children: 6

Edward Fullerton (26 March 1935 – 25 May 1991) was a Sinn Féin councillor from Inishowen in County Donegal, Ireland. He was killed at his Buncrana home in May 1991 by members of the Ulster Defence Association (UDA).

== Childhood and career ==
The eldest of John and Mary (or Maria) Fullerton's 20 children, Fullerton emigrated to Scotland at the age of 18, and then moved to England. He became involved in Irish republicanism in Birmingham, where he also met and married Dinah Peach. They returned to Ireland in 1975 and had six children. He was elected to Donegal County Council for Sinn Féin in 1979, and held his seat until his assassination at age 56.

== Death ==
At 11:50 pm, four armed members of the Ulster Freedom Fighters (a cover name for the UDA) forced their way into an isolated house in Shandrum, outside Buncrana. They held the family occupying the house hostage for 2 hours before stealing a sledgehammer and their car, both of which were to be used in the killing of Fullerton.

At 2:00 am on 25 May 1991, Fullerton and his wife were woken by the sound of their front door being knocked in with a sledgehammer. Fullerton was then shot six times from the stairs as he left the bedroom to investigate the noise.

Following the attack, the loyalists fled across the border. The car used in the attack was later found on fire at around 4:05 am at Coney Road on Culmore Point outside Derry.

The UDA claimed the killing was retaliation for the Provisional IRA killing of Ian Sproule on 13 April 1991 near Castlederg, County Tyrone, alleging that Fullerton had leaked information on Sproule to the IRA from a Garda Síochána meeting. A subsequent Garda investigation found no evidence supporting the claim.

== Police file ==
A month later, a documentary on British television revealed that a police file from Royal Ulster Constabulary (RUC) intelligence containing Fullerton's photograph and details was found in the possession of the UDA in Derry. The weapon used to kill him was recovered two years later. The perpetrators were never found. The Fullerton family has long campaigned for an independent public inquiry into the events surrounding his death.

This was the third killing of an elected representative in the Republic of Ireland since its independence from the United Kingdom.

== Aftermath ==
The shooting dead by the IRA's Derry Brigade of high ranking UDA commander and UDP member Cecil McKnight in the Waterside area of Derry a month later was claimed as retaliation for the death of Fullerton.

== Arrest ==
On 12 December 2021, a 56-year-old man was arrested around 10 am as he was about to attend church in Muff, County Donegal. He was detained under section 30 of the Offences against the person Act and could be detained for up to three days. He was taken to Letterkenny Garda station for questioning. It is the first arrest in the case.

The arrested man was released without charge the following day. A file was to be prepared by the Director of Public Prosecutions.
