= Buncrana Hearts F.C. =

Association football club in County Donegal, Ireland

Buncrana Hearts
- Full name: Buncrana Hearts Football Club
- Nickname: The Hearts
- Founded: 1961
- Ground: Castle Park, Buncrana, County Donegal
- Chairman: John McGrory
- Manager: Gary Duffy
- League: Inishowen Football League
Home colours

Buncrana Hearts Football Club is an association football club based in the Inishowen peninsula, County Donegal. Their senior men's team currently competes in the Inishowen Football League. They play in Castle Park in Buncrana.

== History ==
Buncrana Hearts was established in 1961 and are affectionately known as “The Hearts”. The club have enjoyed much success over the years, most notably winning the Derry and District Treble in 1971, the Inishowen League Treble in 1978 and the Ulster Senior League & Buncrana Summer Cup double in 1993.

The Hearts were a founding member of the Ulster Senior League in 1986 but withdrew from the competition in 2013.

== Ground ==
Castle Park has been the home ground of Buncrana Hearts since 1968 and is located at the Buncrana Youth Club. It has two full-size grass pitches, one grass training pitch and an indoor hall. It also has two 5-a-side Astroturf pitches and separate changing facilities for the football club.

== Youth development ==
Buncrana Hearts' youth structures include various underage teams with six boys' teams playing in the Inishowen Youth and Schoolboys League and four girls' teams playing in the Inishowen Women's Football League. They also cater to younger children with their Soccer Tots programme.

Buncrana Hearts' underage structure in recent times has been extremely successful Thanks to John Mc Grory who was the brains behind the youth set up, producing teams that have won all competitions they have played in the past 20 years. Individual progression has also been excellent in recent times with players progressing to higher levels. Since 2007, the club has had several players go on trial with professional clubs in England.

The club has had several players go on to play for Republic of Ireland at various levels, including Kieran McDaid, Aaron McDaid, Mark McFadden, Jonathan Bonner, Conor O'Donnell, Mark Timlin and Seanán Murphy.

Former players currently playing in the League of Ireland include Mark Timlin (Finn Harps) and Mark McFadden (Derry City FC), with other recent graduates including Jonathan Bonner (Finn Harps, Wexford Youths, Crusaders FC), Conor O'Donnell (UCD AFC, Limerick FC), Colm McLaughlin (Ballinamallard, Institute FC), Kieran McDaid (Finn Harps, Republic of Ireland Amateurs captain) and Rory Kelly (Institute FC, Finn Harps, Derry City FC).

Buncrana Hearts has also produced several prominent women's players in recent years, most notably Leah McDaid (Life University & Northern Ireland international) and Emma Doherty (Republic of Ireland international). Beckie Temple from fergleen park finished the 2022 season top goal scorer with 102 goals in the league. She went on to sign for Leeds united.

== 1993 Ulster Senior League and Buncrana Cup double-winning side ==
Buncrana Hearts won the Ulster Senior League and Buncrana Cup double for the first time in 1992/1993. F.A.I. Development Officer Stephen McNutt was player-manager and was assisted by Sean Murphy with Derek Smith team captain. Player of the Year was Shane Byrne with Top Goalscorer going to John Coyle. The team continued its success the following season narrowly missing out on retaining the title after losing a play-off and by becoming the first winners of the Ulster Senior Cup defeating Letterkenny Rovers in the final.

== Associated clubs ==
In the last few years, Buncrana Hearts have developed a relationship with Derry City in the League of Ireland, and English Championship side Preston North End. This has seen several players join these clubs, either on trial or on a permanent basis.

== Notable players ==
=== Internationals ===
Republic of Ireland U21 internationals

- (Republic of Ireland) Mark Timlin
