= William Lawson Micks =

- Born: 1851; Yorkshire
- Died: 1928
- Citizenship: Irish

William Lawson Micks (1851 in Yorkshire – 1928) was an Irish civil servant.

According to the 1911 census, he resided at 3 Palmerston Villas, Dublin and was the father of four children. He worked with the Congested Districts Board for Ireland (CDB) for the full term of its existence, first as Secretary and from 1909 as a member. He also served as Commissioner with the Local Government Board. He was a confidant of Arthur Balfour, Chief Secretary for Ireland, and befriended Bishop O'Donnell of Raphoe, an influential Catholic member of the CDB. With a unique knowledge of life in Donegal, he drafted a special report on the Rosses in Donegal for the CDB as part of the Baseline Reports which provided a review of conditions in eight western counties in the 1890s. He chaired the Royal Commission on the Poor Law in Ireland (1906) and gave evidence before the Royal Commission on Congestion in Ireland (1907). Along with Samuel Arnold Lawson, he acted as a Trustee for one hundred acres of bogland at Meenawarra near Culdaff on behalf of the purchaser, Jane Leferre. Following his retirement in 1924, he wrote a history of the CDB which was published in 1925. He died in 1928.
