= Art Parkinson =

Irish actor

- Born: 19 October 2001 (age 24); Moville, Inishowen, County Donegal, Ireland
- Occupation: Actor
- Years active: 2008–present

Art Parkinson (born 19 October 2001) is an Irish actor from Moville in Inishowen, County Donegal, Ireland. He began his professional acting career at the age of seven. He is best known for his role as Rickon Stark on the HBO series Game of Thrones (2011–2016), and Kubo in the film Kubo and the Two Strings (2016).

== Personal life ==
Parkinson was raised in Moville, a coastal town on the Inishowen Peninsula in the north of County Donegal in Ireland. His mother, Movania, also an actor, runs a local drama school which Art and his two older brothers, Pearce and Padhraig, attended from a very young age. His two older brothers have also acted in several Irish and British television productions.

He is bilingual, having been educated through the Irish language at both primary school level and latterly at Coláiste Chineal Eoghain. He was selected as Ambassador for Seachtain na Gaeilge le Energia in 2017.

== Career ==
Parkinson played the role of 'Young Kenneth' in the movie Freakdog. He also appeared in the Irish horror film Dark Touch. In July 2014, Parkinson was cast in the 2014 American dark fantasy epic action Dracula Untold directed by Gary Shore. Parkinson also starred in the Hollywood movie San Andreas (2015) as Ollie, a ten-year-old boy caught up in a massive earthquake in California.

== Filmography ==
=== Film ===
Year	Title	Role	Director	Notes	Ref(s)
2008	Freakdog	Young Kenneth	Paddy Breathnach		
2013	Dark Touch	Peter	Marina de Van		
2014	The Anomaly	Alex	Noel Clarke		
2014	Shooting for Socrates	Tommy	James Erskine		
2014	Dracula Untold	Îngeraș	Gary Shore		
2014	Love, Rosie	Gary Dunne	Christian Ditter		
2015	San Andreas	Ollie Taylor	Brad Peyton		
2016	Kubo and the Two Strings	Kubo	Travis Knight	Voice	
2017	I Kill Giants	Dave	Anders Walter		
2017	Zoo	Tom Hall	Colin McIvor		
2018	The Belly of the Whale	Martin Lanks	Morgan Bushe		
2026	Aontas	Éamonn	Damian McCann		

=== Television ===
Year	Title	Role	Network	Notes	Ref(s)
2011–13; 2016	Game of Thrones	Rickon Stark	HBO	14 episodes	
2019–2021	The Bay	Rob Armstrong	ITV	12 episodes	
2024	Say Nothing	Francis	Hulu	6 episodes	

== Awards and nominations ==
Year	Award	Category	Work	Result	Ref.
2017	Annie Award	Outstanding Achievement, Voice Acting in an Animated Feature Production	Kubo and the Two Strings	Nominated	
2017	Behind the Voice Actors Awards	Best Vocal Ensemble in a Feature Film	Kubo and the Two Strings	Won	
2017	Behind the Voice Actors Awards	Breakthrough Voice Actor of the Year	Kubo and the Two Strings	Nominated	
2017	Behind the Voice Actors Awards	Best Male Lead Vocal Performance in a Feature Film	Kubo and the Two Strings	Nominated	
2017	Online Film & Television Association	Best Voice-Over Performance	Kubo and the Two Strings	Nominated	
