= Bocan Stone Circle =

Stone circle near Culdaff, Ireland

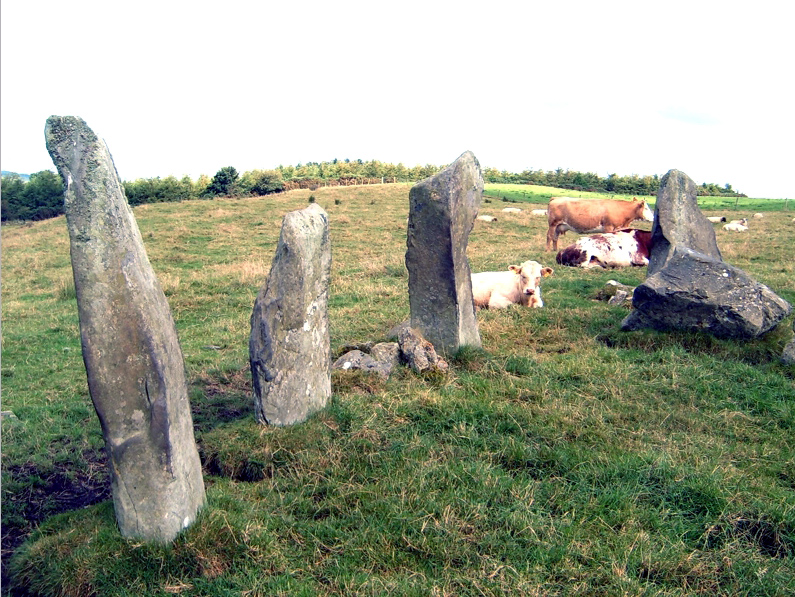
- The stone circle in 2004

- Location in Ireland
- 55.27222°N 7.14805°W
- Type: Stone circle
- Periods: Bronze Age
- Location: County Donegal, Ireland

History
- Built: c. 2250 BC

Site notes
- Material: Stone
- Height: c. 2 meters
- Diameter: c. 18.3 meters

The Bocan Stone Circle is a stone circle situated near the village of Culdaff in the north of Inishowen, a peninsula on the north coast of County Donegal in Ulster, the northern province in Ireland.

== Description ==
The stone circle is located on Bocan Hill, just outside the village of Culdaff on the Inishowen peninsula. It is situated in a heather-covered field.

The stone circle has a diameter of about 18.3 metres. Only seven of the stones are currently standing, the others are fallen or broken. There were originally around 30 stones, some up to 2 metres tall. Two tall stones seem to mark an entrance. Opposite this entrance are two smaller stones, and it has been suggested that the stone circle is aligned on an east-west axis between Slieve Snaght and Jura, Scotland, which is visible on a clear day. In 1816, it was reported that "graves" with "earthen urns" had been uncovered in the circle.
