= Congested Districts Board for Ireland =

British attempt to reduce poverty, 1891–1923

Flag of the Congested Districts Board, 1893–1907

Flag of the Congested Districts Board, 1907–1916

The Congested Districts Board for Ireland was established by Arthur Balfour, the Chief Secretary for Ireland, in 1891 to alleviate poverty and congested living conditions in the west and parts of the northwest of Ireland.

William Lawson Micks worked with the Congested Districts Board (C.D.B.) for the full term of its existence, first as Secretary and from 1909 as a member. The board was dissolved in 1923 by the new Government of the Irish Free State, and its staff absorbed into the Irish Land Commission when its functions were assumed by the Department of Fisheries and Rural Industries.

The C.D.B. was part of the Conservative policy of Constructive Unionism or 'killing Home Rule with kindness'. Its purpose was to alleviate poverty by paying for public works, such as building piers for small ports on the west coast, to assist fishing, modernising farming methods or sponsoring local factories to give employment and stop emigration from Ireland – the wider effect would see indigenous (and non-Government funded) initiatives. In the Aran Islands, a knitwear industry was established which to this day provides Aran knitwear on a commercial basis using local skilled knitters and designers. Regions under the Board's authority were areas where the rateable valuation was less than 30 shillings. The entire area which was so categorised came to 3,500,000 acres (14,000 km^{2}) in 1901 with a population of 550,000.

Funds for the C.D.B. came from the Church of Ireland, but by 1912 other funds had been allocated and its assets totalled £530,000 (equivalent to £40 million at 2010 values).

Following the Land Purchase (Ireland) Act 1903, the C.D.B. was authorised to purchase extra land from large estates to enlarge the small holdings of tenants. In 1909, it was granted compulsory powers of purchase and began redistributing over 1,000 estates totalling 2,000,000 acres (8,100 km^{2}).

It was acutely criticised by the nationalist Frank Hugh O'Donnell in 1908. O'Donnell considered that the C.D.B. was run by local Catholic priests, was not properly supervised by the British Government and was being used to fund church projects such as Industrial schools where the young workers were underpaid. He felt that capital loaned to real businesses would be more effective than advancing the money to parish councils run by priests. He considered that the £100,000 paid to build St Eunan's College and the Cathedral of St. Eunan and St Columba in Letterkenny was too great a burden for its 2,000 inhabitants, and found that the C.D.B. head, Bishop O'Donnell of Raphoe, had indirectly applied grants towards the buildings.

One legacy of the C.D.B. was the Co-Operative movement which was founded by Sir Horace Plunkett who had been shocked by his experiences working as a member of the first Board.

A great achievement for the board was the enlargement and improvement of holdings. This involved the board purchasing land from larger estates and expanding the properties in order to create smaller more efficient holdings. The French estate, near Ballygar in County Galway, was the board's first purchase of land. The land cost the board £7,600, by 1919 the board had spent a total of ten million pounds on land. The amelioration of The Dillion Estate in the counties Galway and Roscommon is a great example of the Congested District Boards work. In 1899 the board purchased the Dillion Estate of over 93,652 acres which valued £290,000, the largest price paid by the CDB for any one estate. The majority of the holdings on this estate had poor drainage and poor land which were accustomed to constant flooding. The board solved this issue by investing in large scale drainage operation which also doubled the productive value of hundreds of acres across the estates. They also did work on the roads, fencing and created houses. Baron Ardilaun's estate, Lord Bingham's estate, the Marquess of Clanricarde's estate and Viscount Dillon's estate were among the many estates purchased by the C.D.B.

The Congested District Board has had a crucial impact on the fishing industry in the congested districts. The C.D.B spent over £100,000 in construction works, including marine works for example, the building of harbours, piers, roads, bridges and drainage works. This work was undertaken to offer facilities and resources to fishermen, farmers and gardeners. The board worked with the fishing industry providing instruction on barrel making, net making and boat building. The board provided ninety-one decked fishing boats around Ireland and twenty-three of these boats were built on the coast of Connemara and in Killybegs in County Donegal. These boats were valued at £15,000 without any nets or gear

== Modern assessment ==
Irish historian J. J. Lee in his book The Modernisation of Irish Society evaluated the Congeseted Districts Board in writing: "The Board's promise, in short, generally far exceeded its performance". He pointed out that the C.D.B. invested heavily in uneconomic projects in the west of Ireland and in County Donegal in the west of Ulster, projects that floundered once they stopped being subsidised. As a result, the flow of emigration from the west and north-west of Ireland was not converted into internal migration to the more developed east, as might have been hoped.

== See also ==
- Congested Districts Board (Scotland)
