= Ulster Senior League (association football) =

- Founded: 1986
- Folded: 2023
- Country: (Republic of Ireland) Ireland
- Region: Ulster
- Number of clubs: 5
- Level on pyramid: 3
- Domestic cup(s): FAI Cup; FAI Intermediate Cup; Ulster Senior Cup
- League cup: Ulster Senior League Cup
- Last champions: Cockhill Celtic (2022–23)
- Most championships: Fanad United (14)
- Website: uslfootball.com

The Ulster Senior League was an association football league featuring amateur, intermediate, and League of Ireland reserve teams. Together with the Connacht Senior League, Leinster Senior League and the Munster Senior League, it formed the third level of the Republic of Ireland football league system. Ulster Senior League teams also competed in the FAI Cup, the FAI Intermediate Cup and the Ulster Senior Cup (organised by the Ulster FA and known as the Knockalla Caravans Cup for sponsorship reasons). The winners of the Ulster Senior League were also invited to play in the now defunct League of Ireland Cup.

Despite using the Ulster name in its title, almost all of its clubs were based in County Donegal with the only exceptions being Derry City and, very briefly, Monaghan United. The most successful club in the league was Fanad United who won fourteen league titles and ten league cups. The USL began life as a winter league but changed to a summer league between 2007 and 2016, with the season typically operating from April to October, before returning to a winter league until its demise in 2023.

By 2022, there were only five teams competing and the league folded after the conclusion of the 2022–23 season, with member clubs returning to junior football in the Inishowen and Donegal leagues.

== History ==
The Ulster Senior League was formed in 1986 with Buncrana Hearts, Carndonagh F.C., Cockhill Celtic, Culdaff F.C., Fanad United, Letterkenny Rovers and Swilly Rovers among the founder clubs. The driving force behind the establishment of the league was Fr. Michael Sweeney, a pioneer of junior and intermediate association football in County Donegal. In addition to founding the Ulster Senior League (USL), Sweeney had earlier been instrumental in both establishing the Donegal League and forming Fanad United. Fanad United were the inaugural USL champions in 1986–87 and they subsequently went on to become the league's most successful club, winning fourteen league titles and ten league cups. In later seasons, Cockhill Celtic challenged Fanad United's dominance, winning their first title in 2010 and then nine consecutive titles between 2013 and 2022.

The winners of the Ulster Senior League were regularly invited to participate in the League of Ireland Cup. Fanad United were semi-finalists in 1987–88 while Cockhill Celtic, Culdaff and Swilly Rovers all represented the USL in the competition. Fanad United have also won the FAI Intermediate Cup twice while Letterkenny Rovers were finalists in 2015–16.

The 1995–96 season saw Drumoghill F.C. enter the USL for the first time. Winning the Premier Division of the Donegal Junior League the previous season had afforded Drumoghill the opportunity to compete at intermediate level and they duly applied to the USL. The following season saw Keadue Rovers join the intermediate ranks. In 2001, Kildrum Tigers also joined after winning the Premier Division of the Donegal Junior League.

In 2007, the league voted to switch to a calendar year for their fixtures and began to see a series of withdrawals from the league, starting with Keadue Rovers in 2008. In 2012, Killea F.C. withdrew from the league followed by Buncrana Hearts in 2013. When Kildrum Tigers also withdrew in January 2014, it left the league with eight teams remaining. Clubs cited the loss of players to the Junior leagues, who had remained on a winter season, as the reason for the difficulties in fielding teams. To address this, the league returned to a winter season but the withdrawals continued. Finn Harps withdrew their reserve team in February 2015 and Drumkeen United withdrew later that July. Although Finn Harps reserves later returned, the USL suffered another team withdrawal when Swilly Rovers left in 2019. September 2020 saw the league's most successful club, Fanad United, announce their withdrawal from the USL to join the Donegal Junior League. This left the USL with just five competing teams heading into the 2020–2021 season.

In April 2021, Monaghan United, a former League of Ireland club, announced they would join the Ulster Senior League for the 2021–22 season. This made them the first club from Monaghan or Cavan to play in the USL. However, they withdrew from the league after just one season.

By 2022, there were only five teams competing and the league folded after the conclusion of the 2022–23 season. After the league's demise, Cockhill Celtic, Bonagee United and Letterkenny Rovers returned to their respective junior leagues.

== League pyramid ==
The Ulster Senior League was founded with only one division but a second division was later added, called the First Division. The First Division was still in existence by 2009 but played its final season in 2013 and the top division began sourcing replacement teams from Ulster junior leagues instead.

At the time the league folded, there was no promotion or relegation system in place between the League of Ireland First Division (Level 2 of the national league system) and the intermediate provincial leagues (Level 3), which included Ulster. Additionally, while junior clubs in Ulster could apply to join the intermediate ranks if they felt capable, similar to Munster there was no formal promotion/relegation from the junior leagues into the Ulster intermediate ranks.

Below was the format for the league pyramid at provincial level.

Colour-coding key
Intermediate (levels 3–6)
Junior (level 7)

Pyramid Level	League(s) / division(s)
3	Ulster Senior League Senior Division 0 clubs – defunct
4	Ulster Senior League First Division 0 clubs – defunct
5	None
6	None
7	Donegal Junior League; Inishowen Football League; Monaghan Cavan League

== 2022–23 teams ==
Team	Home town/suburb	Home ground
Bonagee United	Letterkenny	Dry Arch Park
Cockhill Celtic	Buncrana	Charlie O'Donnell Sports Grounds
Derry City Reserves	Derry	Brandywell Stadium
Finn Harps U21	Ballybofey	Finn Park
Letterkenny Rovers	Letterkenny	Leckview Park

== Champions ==
=== List of winners by season ===
Season	Winner	Runner-up
2022–23	Cockhill Celtic	Bonagee United
2021–22	Cockhill Celtic	Bonagee United
2019–20	Cockhill Celtic	Bonagee United
2018–19	Cockhill Celtic	
2017–18	Cockhill Celtic	
2016–17	Cockhill Celtic	Letterkenny Rovers
2016	Cockhill Celtic	Derry City Reserves
2015	Cockhill Celtic	Bonagee United
2014	Cockhill Celtic	Derry City Reserves
2013	Cockhill Celtic	Drumkeen United
2012	Derry City Reserves	Cockhill Celtic
2011	Fanad United	Cockhill Celtic
2010	Cockhill Celtic	
2009	Letterkenny Rovers	Kildrum Tigers
2008	Kildrum Tigers	Letterkenny Rovers
2007	Kildrum Tigers	Fanad United
2006–07	Fanad United	Kildrum Tigers
2005–06	Fanad United	Kildrum Tigers
2004–05	Letterkenny Rovers	Kildrum Tigers
2003–04	Kildrum Tigers	Letterkenny Rovers
2002–03	Quigley's Point Swifts	Letterkenny Rovers
2001–02	Quigley's Point Swifts	Letterkenny Rovers
2000–01	Fanad United	Quigley's Point Swifts
1999–00	Swilly Rovers	Keadue Rovers
1998–99	Finn Harps Reserves	Swilly Rovers
1997–98	Fanad United	Swilly Rovers
1996–97	Fanad United	
1995–96	Fanad United	Derry City Reserves
1994–95	Fanad United	
1993–94	Fanad United	Finn Harps Reserves
1992–93	Buncrana Hearts	Fanad United
1991–92	Fanad United	
1990–91	Fanad United	
1989–90	Fanad United	
1988–89	Culdaff	Fanad United & Letterkenny Rovers
1987–88	Fanad United	Letterkenny Rovers
1986–87	Fanad United	

=== List of winners by club ===
Club	Titles	Seasons
Fanad United	14	1986–87, 1987–88, 1989–90, 1990–91, 1991–92, 1993–94, 1994–95, 1995–96, 1996–97, 1997–98, 2000–01, 2005–06, 2006–07, 2011
Cockhill Celtic	11	2010, 2013, 2014, 2015, 2016, 2016–17, 2017–18, 2018–19, 2019–20, 2021–22, 2022–23
Kildrum Tigers	3	2003–04, 2007, 2008
Letterkenny Rovers	2	2004–05, 2009
Quigley's Point Swifts	2	2001–02, 2002–03
Buncrana Hearts	1	1992–93
Culdaff	1	1988–89
Derry City Reserves	1	2012
Finn Harps Reserves	1	1998–99
Swilly Rovers	1	1999–00

== Ulster Senior League Cup ==
The Ulster Senior League Cup has had four different sponsors since first being played for in 1986–87. Initially, the competition was sponsored by the Hotel Glenveagh in Gweedore before being sponsored by Hydro Seafoods, then Marine Harvest and finally the Donegal News. The format consisted of group games before teams advanced to a straight knockout. The group winners secured a home semi-final.

=== Finals ===
Season	Winner	Score	Runner-up	Venue
1986–87	Carndonagh	1–0	Culdaff	
1987–88	Fanad United	4–4	Buncrana Hearts	
Replay	Fanad United	1–0	Buncrana Hearts	
1988–89	Fanad United	3–0	Derry City Reserves	
1989–90	St Catherine's	4–3	Swilly Rovers	
1990–91	Derry City Reserves	0–0	Fanad United	
Replay	Derry City Reserves	0–0	Fanad United	
2nd Replay	Derry City Reserves	2–0	Fanad United	
1991–92	Letterkenny Rovers	3–0	Bonagee United	
1992–93	Fanad United	1–0 (Note: After extra time)	Buncrana Hearts	
1993–94				
1994–95	Fanad United	3–1	Buncrana Hearts	
1995–96	Fanad United	2–1	Drumoghill Celtic	
1996–97	Derry City Reserves	2–0	Drumkeen United	
1997–98	Swilly Rovers	5–0 (Note: 1997–98 final abandoned with Swilly Rovers leading Derry City Reserves 5–0 at half-time)	Derry City Reserves	
1998–99	Swilly Rovers	2–1	Fanad United	
1999–00	Drumoghill Celtic	3–0	Fanad United	
2000–01	Derry City Reserves	2–0	Quigleys Point Swifts	
2001–02	Letterkenny Rovers	3–0	Swilly Rovers	
2002–03	Bonagee United	2–0	Fanad United	
2003–04	Letterkenny Rovers	4–0	Keadue Rovers	
2004–05	Fanad United	3–0	Swilly Rovers	
2005–06	Fanad United	1–1 (Note: After extra time. Fanad United win 4–2 on penalties)	Killea	
2006–07	Kildrum Tigers	2–0	Fanad United	
2007	Fanad United	1–0	Swilly Rovers	
2008	Fanad United	2–0	Buncrana Hearts	Dry Arch Park
2009	Drumkeen United	2–2 (Note: After extra time. Drumkeen United win 4–2 on penalties)	Fanad United	
2010	Cockhill Celtic	3–0	Derry City Reserves	
2011	Fanad United	2–1	Cockhill Celtic	Leckview Park
2012	Letterkenny Rovers	5–3	Drumkeen United	
2013	Cockhill Celtic	1–0	Drumkeen United	
2014	Cockhill Celtic	1–0	Swilly Rovers	
2015	Cockhill Celtic	2–1	Bonagee United	
2015–16	Cockhill Celtic	2–0	Letterkenny Rovers	Dry Arch Park
2016–17	Cockhill Celtic	1–0	Derry City Reserves	Dry Arch Park
2017–18	Cockhill Celtic	3–1	Letterkenny Rovers	Maginn Park
2018–19	Letterkenny Rovers	3–1	Cockhill Celtic	Finn Park
2019–20	Bonagee United	3–2	Letterkenny Rovers	Diamond Park, Ballyare
2020–21				
2021–22	Bonagee United	3–2	Monaghan United	Gortakeegan
2022–23	Bonagee United	4–3	Cockhill Celtic	Maginn Park

== Representative team ==
An Ulster Senior League representative team competes in the FAI Intermediate Interprovincial Tournament against teams representing the Leinster Senior League, the Munster Senior League and Connacht.

== Notable former players ==
Republic of Ireland internationals

- (Republic of Ireland) Shay Given

Northern Ireland U21 international

- (Northern Ireland) Michael Duffy

League of Ireland First Division Top Scorer

- (Republic of Ireland) Kevin McHugh

League of Ireland manager

- (Republic of Ireland) Paul Hegarty
