= Coláiste Chineál Eoghain =

Location
- Tullyarvan Mill, Buncrana, County Donegal; Ireland; 55.1440°N 7.4526°W

Information
- Type: Secondary school
- Motto: Tapaigh an Deis (Seize the Opportunity)
- Established: 2007
- Founder: Donegal VEC
- Principal: Claire Doherty
- Staff: 10
- Enrollment: Around 30
- Language: Irish
- Colour: Blue
- Website: www.colaisteeoghain.com

Coláiste Chineál Eoghain (CCE Buncrana) is a secondary school in Buncrana, County Donegal, Ireland. It provides a curriculum taught through the Irish language. The school is located in Tullyarvan Mill in Buncrana, and first opened in 2007 under the patronage of the Donegal VEC. This was later replaced by the Donegal Education and Training Board.

Due to the small number of pupils there was some concern expressed about the long term viability of the school. However the then Minister of State at the Department of Arts, Heritage and the Gaeltacht and Communications, Energy and Natural Resources, with responsibility for Gaeltacht, Joe McHugh, confirmed that the school would not be closing. He further stated that ‘the school will be provided with the necessary support and resources to ensure the long-term viability of the school’.

Students from the school come predominately from Inishowen. However the school also takes in students from further afield including but not limited to Derry and Letterkenny.

== Notable former pupils ==
- Art Parkinson, Actor and ambassador for Seachtain na Gaeilge le Energia 2017.
