= Charlie O'Donnell Sports Grounds =

Soccer ground in County Donegal, Ireland

- Páirc Imeartha Shéarlas Uí Dhomhnaill
- Location within Ireland
- Former names: St. Mary's Park
- Address: Cockhill, Buncrana, County Donegal
- Coordinates: 55.15°N 7.43746°W
- Capacity: 1,000
- Type: football stadium
- Surface: Grass
- Pitch size: 110 by 74 yards (101 by 68 m)
- Public transit: Buncrana bus stop (O’Donnell’s Supervalu) (McGonagle's / Dublin City & Airport Direct City Express)

Construction
- Groundbreaking: 2000
- Opened: August 2003
- Main contractor: Seamus Fullerton

Tenant
- Cockhill Celtic F.C.

The Charlie O'Donnell Sports Grounds is an association football (soccer) stadium located in Buncrana, County Donegal, Ireland. It is the home ground of Cockhill Celtic F.C. The grounds were opened as St. Mary's Park in 2003 by Mary Coughlan TD. Named after longtime club chairman Charlie O'Donnell in 2007, the club also has two astroturf pitches.

== History ==
In 1994, the club's management committee approached local landowner Patrick McKinney to obtain land for a new pitch. After an agreement was reached, Cockhill Celtic completed the purchase of the land in June 1996. In July 2000, the club received a £40,000 grant to begin work on the pitch, which would later be known as St. Mary's Park. By September 2000, the grass was sown and the pitch dimensions were set out at 110 yards long and 74 yards wide. After progress was halted due to a lack of funds, further grant applications were made to the Department of Sport, Tourism and Recreation in 2001 and 2003. Although the 2001 submission was unsuccessful, an allocation of €25,000 was received in April 2003 to complete the ground. In August 2003, TD and Minister for Social & Family Affairs Mary Coughlan, officially opened the new development. The club grounds were renamed after longtime chairman Charlie O'Donnell in 2007.

In 2017 the grounds suffered flood damage; the club received €101,000 from a UEFA Natural Disaster Grant. In August 2021, work was completed on a new stand which was named after former chairman Mickey Gill.
