= Maginn Park =

Soccer stadium in County Donegal, Ireland

- Páirc Mhic Fhinn
- Interactive map of Maginn Park
- Location: Maginn Avenue, Buncrana, County Donegal
- Coordinates: 55.135642°N 7.451374°W
- Capacity: 2,000
- Surface: Grass
- Public transit: Buncrana bus stop

Tenants
- Derry City F.C. (2017)

Maginn Park is a football stadium in Buncrana, County Donegal, Ireland. It is used by the amateur Inishowen Football League for staging cup finals and other important matches. During the 2017 League of Ireland season, the ground served as the temporary home of Derry City.

The Inishowen Football League purchased Maginn Park from the Buncrana Football Committee in the late 1990s for €127,000. As well as serving as the headquarters of the organisation, Maginn Park is also used for staging cup finals, league finals and representative games.

== Facilities ==
Maginn Park has a floodlit grass pitch with a sprinkler system and a stand with 250 seats. It also has two artificial turf pitches and portacabin changing facilities with storage sheds all inside the compound.

== Derry City ==
Derry City played their home games at Maginn Park from the beginning of the 2017 season, due to renovation works at the Brandywell Stadium in Derry. The first League of Ireland match at the ground, against Limerick in March 2017, was abandoned after 25 minutes due to floodlight failure and torrential rain. The final match in October 2017 was a 1–1 draw against St. Patrick’s Athletic.
