= Cockhill Celtic F.C. =

Irish football club

Coordinates: 55.1500°N 7.4374°W

- Full name: Cockhill Celtic Youth and Football Club
- Short name: Cockhill
- Founded: 28 October 1970; 55 years ago
- Ground: Charlie O'Donnell Sports Grounds, Buncrana
- Chairman: Joe McLaughlin
- Manager: Gavin Cullen
- League: FAI National League
- 2025–26: Inishowen Football League, 1st of 9
Home colours	Away colours

Cockhill Celtic Football Club is an Irish association football (soccer) club based in Buncrana, County Donegal. The club's senior men's team competes in the FAI National League, the third tier of the Republic of Ireland football league system. The club also fields teams in the regional Inishowen Football League.

The club qualified for the FAI Cup in 2014. In December 2025, Cockhill Celtic were announced as one of the 15 teams that would participate in the FAI National League's inaugural season.

== History ==
Cockhill Celtic Youth and Football Club was founded on 28 October 1970 as Westbrook Celtic by a group of men — which included Michael Doherty and Joe McLaughlin — who played football in Buncrana. The club originally played their matches on a pitch called Coneyburrow, on the Castle Grounds in Buncrana, while they competed in both the Derry & District Football League (D&D League) and the Inishowen Football League. They moved to Cockhill and became 'Cockhill Celtic' in 1974, and moved into the Inishowen Football League. They remained there until 2005, when the club transferred to the Ulster Senior League.

After the 1984–85 season, the club decided to apply to the Ulster Senior League. In 1989, the association football club amalgamated with the local youth club to become collectively known as 'Cockhill Celtic Youth and Football Club'.

The club qualified for the FAI Cup in 2014.

Gavin Cullen was appointed manager in June 2015, replacing Donal O'Brien. The former Finn Harps goalkeeper initially took over as player-manager, having previously managed the youth side.

In April 2024, Cockhill became champions of the Inishowen Football League Premier Division after defeating Greencastle 2–0. The club won the league title again in 2025–26.

In December 2025, with the addition of the FAI National League—the third national tier—Cockhill Celtic was announced as one of the 15 teams participating in the inaugural 2026 season.

== Squad ==
=== National League squad ===
As of September 2026

Note: Flags indicate national team as defined under FIFA eligibility rules; some limited exceptions apply. Players may hold more than one non-FIFA nationality.

No.	Pos.	Nation	Player
1	GK	IRL	Harry Doherty
2	DF	IRL	Lee McLaughlin
3	DF	IRL	Lee McColgan (captain)
5	DF	NIR	Jason Breslin
6	MF	IRL	Adam Duffy
7	FW	IRL	Luke Rudden
8	MF	IRL	Damian Duffy
9	FW	IRL	Garbhan Friel
10	MF	IRL	Corey McBride
11	FW	IRL	Jay Bradley
12	MF	IRL	James Bradley
14	DF	IRL	Odhran O'Brien Daly
15	MF	IRL	Kieran McElroy
16	MF	IRL	Tiernan Ruddy

No.	Pos.	Nation	Player
17	FW	IRL	Nathan McDaid
18	MF	IRL	Jack Mullan
19	MF	IRL	Danny McDaid
21	MF	IRL	Conor Graham
22	FW	IRL	Seamus McLaughlin
23	FW	IRL	Brendan McLauglin
25	GK	IRL	Shane O'Gara
—	GK	IRL	Gavin Cullen
—	DF	IRL	Oisin McColgan
—	DF	IRL	Peter Doherty
—	MF	IRL	Daniel Martin Doherty

== Ground ==
Cockhill Celtic play their home games at the Charlie O'Donnell Sports Grounds. The club's home ground is named after long-time chairman Charlie O'Donnell (chair from 1978 until his death in 2007). The ground seats 1,000 people and is located on Cockhill in Buncrana. The club also has two astroturf pitches.

In 2017, the club grounds suffered flood damage; they received €101,000 from a UEFA Natural Disaster Grant.

== Honours ==
- Ulster Senior League (11): 2010, 2013, 2014, 2015, 2016, 2016–17, 2017–18, 2018–19, 2019–2020, 2021–2022, 2022–2023
- FAI Intermediate Cup (0): (runner-up in 2022–2023)
- FAI Junior Cup (1): 2023–2024
- Ulster Senior League Cup (7): 2010, 2013, 2014, 2015, 2016, 2017, 2018
- Inishowen Football League (7): 1988–89, 1990–91, 1991–92, 1999–2000, 2004–05, 2023–2024, 2025–26

== In culture ==
- The club are mentioned in Joseph O'Connor's novel Inishowen (2000).
