= Inishowen Independent =

- Type: Weekly newspaper
- Format: Tabloid
- Editor: Damian Dowds
- Founded: March 2007
- Language: English
- Headquarters: Buncrana
- Website: www.inishowenindo.ie

The Inishowen Independent is a local print and digital newspaper for Inishowen, County Donegal, Ireland. It has offices at 66 Millbrae in Buncrana.

Launched in March 2007, it is one of several regional newspapers in the area. The newspaper's print edition is published every Tuesday.
