= 1999 FAI Cup final =

- Event: 1998–99 FAI Cup
Bray Wanderers	Finn Harps
2	1
- Bray won after two replays

Final
Bray Wanderers	Finn Harps
0	0
- Referee: John McDermott (all 3 matches)

Replay
Bray Wanderers	Finn Harps
2	2

2nd Replay
Bray Wanderers	Finn Harps
2	1

The 1999 FAI Cup final was the deciding match of the 1998–99 FAI Cup. Bray Wanderers and Finn Harps contested the final. Two replays were required before Bray Wanderers won the competition. The initial match finished 0–0. The first replay, which stood at 1–1 after 90 minutes, finished 2–2 after extra-time. Ahead of the second replay, the Football Association of Ireland announced that should the game again finish as a draw after extra-time, a penalty shoot-out would be played. However, this was not necessary as Bray won the second replay 2–1.

Charlie McGeever was Finn Harps manager. On the second of the three games, he said during an interview with the Sunday Independent in 2012: "It was like groundhog day. It was up to Dublin, play Bray, back home, up to Dublin again. Three times we came up to Dublin, and we left it behind us, especially the second day, when we were a goal up and 30 seconds left. Then we conceded a penalty, our 'keeper saved it, but they [Bray] got to the rebound first".
