= Culdaff =

Seaside village in County Donegal, Ireland

Culdaff Cúil Dabhcha
- Village
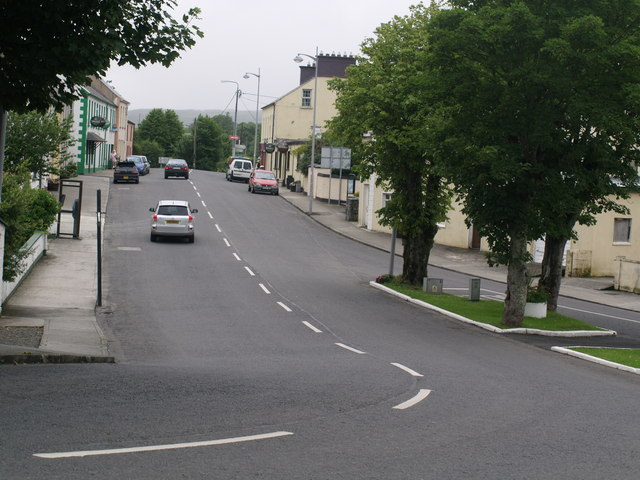
- Main Street

- Location in Ireland
- Coordinates: 55°15′N 7°16′W
- Country: Ireland
- Province: Ulster
- County: County Donegal

Government
  - Dáil Éireann: Donegal

Population (2022)
  - Total: 385
- Time zone: UTC+0 (WET)
  - Summer (DST): UTC-1 (IST (WEST))
- Irish Grid Reference: C467453

Culdaff (Irish: Cúil Dabhcha) is a village, civil parish and townland on the Inishowen peninsula of County Donegal, Ireland. Known for its beach, it attracts tourists from all over Ireland. As of 2022, the population was 385.

The present village dates back to the 8th century and was originally the site of the monastery of St Buadán (Baithéne mac Brénaind), after which the Church of Ireland is named. William Lawson Micks and Samuel Arnold Lawson, acted as Trustees for one hundred acres of bogland at Meenawarra near Culdaff on behalf of the purchaser, Jane Leferre.

== Culdaff Beach ==
Culdaff beach is only about 50 yards away from the village. It includes two beaches, 'the small beach' and 'the big beach'. The beach can be busy during the summer, and is known for the expansive sand on the main beach, and a large area of rocks around the second and further along the coastline.

== Fishing ==
The Bunagee Pier is used as a mooring for boats that take anglers out to fish. Fish caught offshore include White Pollock, Black Pollock, Plaice, Rock Salmon, Sea Trout, and Salmon. Shell Fish include Brown Crab, Lobster, Green Crab, and Velvet Crab.

== Sport ==
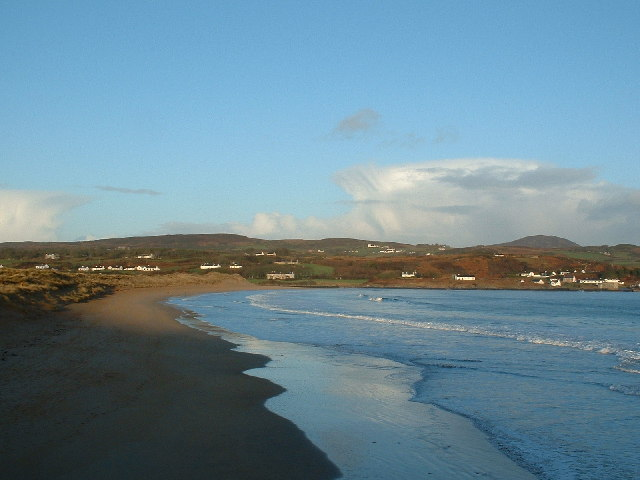
Culdaff Bay

The main sport in Culdaff is football and the team is part of the Jackie Crossan Premier Division of the Inishowen Football League. Their home ground, Caratra Park, is next to the beach.

== Places of interest ==
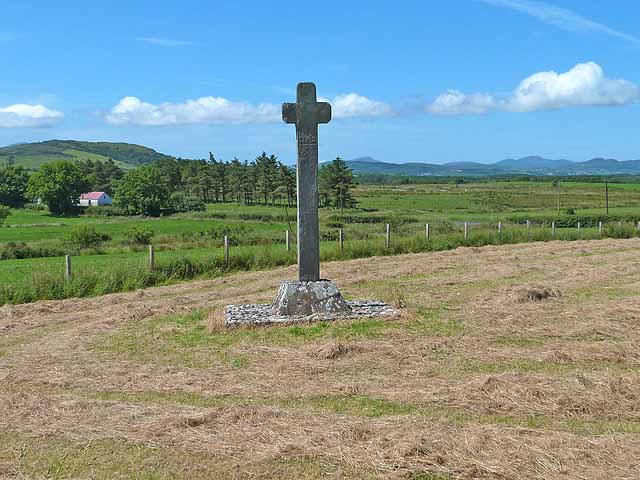
St Buadan's Cross, Clonca

Ancient monuments in the area (located near the Bocan chapel) include the Carrowmore High Crosses, the Cloncha Cross, the Bocan Stone Circle and the Temple of Deen (a ruined court tomb). Also nearby is St. Buadan's high cross which is covered with interlacing and figures of Christ, clerics and animals. Other sights include St. Bodans Rock (located below the Bridge), and the site of old St Bodans well (located behind the Church of Ireland).

== Notable people ==
- Charles Macklin (1699–1797), actor and dramatist
- Frederick Young (1786–1874), soldier
