= Rebound (sports) =

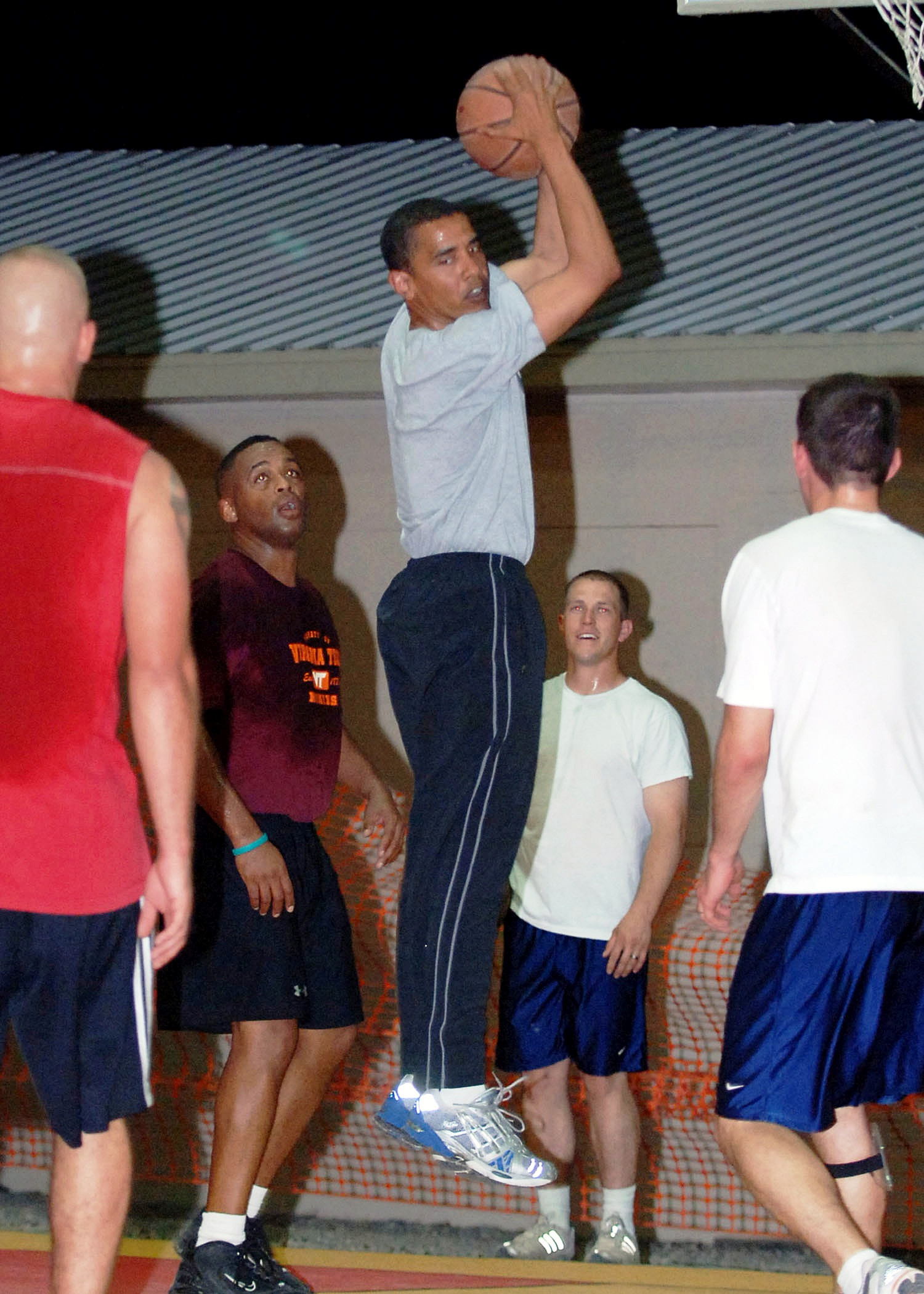
Barack Obama rebounding the ball in a game of basketball with U.S. military personnel in Djibouti

In a game of ice hockey, Sidney Crosby (far left) and Matt Niskanen battle for position near the net to collect the puck on a potential rebound as Bryan Rust (far right) fires a shot towards goaltender Braden Holtby.

'Rebound' is a term used in sports to describe the ball (or puck or other object of play) becoming available for possession by either opponent after an attempt to put the ball or puck into the goal has been unsuccessful. Rebounds are generally considered to be a major part of the game, as they often lead either to a possession change or to a second (and often better) opportunity to score by the side whose initial attempt failed.

In sports such as basketball and netball, the term is also used as either noun or verb to describe the successful retrieval of the ball in that circumstance.

In sports that have an assigned goalkeeper or goaltender, after that player makes a save, they may (and if they are able, usually should) then retain immediate possession of the ball or puck themselves, thus preventing a rebound from occurring.

== Rebounds in basketball ==
In basketball, rebounds are divided into two categories: offensive rebounds, in which the ball is recovered by the offensive side and does not change possession, and defensive rebounds, in which the defending team gain possession of the loose ball. Generally, most rebounds are defensive because the team on defense tends to be in a better position (in other words, closer to the basket) to recover missed shots. Often these are grouped under the rebounds per game statistic which denotes the average number of rebounds a player or team averages for a series or season.

The single-game record for rebounds in an NBA game is 55, set by Wilt Chamberlain against the Boston Celtics on November 24, 1960.

== Football Rebounder ==
A football rebounder is the name of a piece of training equipment used for practicing football (soccer). The football is kicked into the frame which then returns the ball back to the player mimicking a pass from a teammate. Football rebounders help players anticipate passes and improve their reactions. Football rebounders come in many forms such as small solid rebound boards which bounce the ball back to you in a variety of ways either along the floor or through the air. Another form of football rebounder is similar to a trampoline, they consist of a solid frame with either a mesh net or wireframe stretched over them to create tension which then returns the ball in a similar way as a player would.

== Rebounds in ice hockey ==
In ice hockey, a rebound occurs when a shot on goal is stopped by the goaltender but the puck remains in play and available for another shot attempt. Rebound opportunities are often considered dangerous scoring chances because they can force the goaltender to recover quickly and may leave defensive players out of position.

The importance of rebounds is also reflected in hockey analysis and coaching, where controlling or clearing rebounds is treated as a key defensive skill for goaltenders and defenders, while generating rebound chances is viewed as an important offensive tactic.
