= Fanad United F.C. =

Coordinates: 55°14′49.6″N 7°41′21.8″W

- Full name: Fanad United Football Club
- Nickname: The Kingdom
- Founded: 1970
- Ground: Traigh-a-Loch
- Chairman: Martin McGonigle
- Manager: Paul Friel
- League: Ulster Senior League; A Championship; League of Ireland U19 Division
Home colours	Away colours

Fanad United Football Club (Irish: Cumann Peile Fánaid Aontaithe) is an Irish association football club based in Fanad in the north of County Donegal. Their senior men's team currently plays in the Donegal Junior League. In 1986–87 they were both founding members and inaugural champions of the Ulster Senior League. They remain the USL's most successful club, having won fourteen titles. They also field teams in both the Donegal Youth League and the Donegal Women's League. They have previously fielded teams in both the A Championship and the League of Ireland U19 Division. They have also played in the FAI Cup, the League of Ireland Cup and the FAI Intermediate Cup. They have won the latter competition on two occasions, in 1987–88 and 1994–95. In September 2020 the club made the decision to Leave the USL and Intermediate Football and return to Junior Football in the Donegal League.

== History ==
=== Early years ===
Fanad United was founded in 1970 by Fr. Michael Sweeney, a pioneer of junior and intermediate association football in County Donegal. In addition to founding Fanad United, Fr Sweeney was also instrumental in establishing two leagues the club initially played in, the Donegal League and the Ulster Senior League. He has also served on the board of Finn Harps. Between 1972 and 1973 and 1983–84, Fanad United were Donegal champions five times before becoming both founding members and the inaugural champions of the USL in 1986–87. They subsequently became the USL's most successful club, winning fourteen league titles and ten league cups.

The club's home kit was originally blue, based on Manchester City's home colours of sky blue. However, they switched to City's away kit of red and black stripes. Fanad's away kit remains blue.

=== National cups ===
Fr. Michael Sweeney also served as Fanad United's team manager and he was responsible for guiding the club to victory in two national cup competitions. In 1978–79 United won the FAI Youth Cup after defeating Shelbourne U19 3–1 in the final at Swilly Park. In 1987–88, captained by Eddie McGinley, they won the FAI Intermediate Cup after defeating Tramore Athletic 1–0 at Dalymount Park. Under player-manager Eamon McConigley, Fanad United won the FAI Intermediate Cup for a second time in 1994–95, this time defeating College Corinthians in the final at Terryland Park. In 1995–96 they were finalists for a second successive season but lost to Wayside Celtic.

As winners of the Ulster Senior League, Fanad United have regularly been invited to participate in the League of Ireland Cup. Their best performance in this competition came in 1987–88 when they reached the semi-finals. After they finished top of their group, following three wins against Sligo Rovers, Derry City and Finn Harps, they qualified for the quarter-finals where they defeated Galway United 1–0. In the semi-final they lost 4–1 to Shamrock Rovers. Fanad United have also achieved some notable results in the FAI Cup. In 1991–92, despite going down to nine men, they defeated Home Farm 2–0 away from home in the first round. In the second round they held St James's Gate to two 1–1 draws before eventually losing 3–2 in the second replay. In 1995–96 they defeated Bray Wanderers 4–0 at the Carlisle Grounds before losing 3–0 to St Patrick's Athletic in the round of sixteen. In the 2005 FAI Cup they played Shamrock Rovers at Dalymount Park losing 2–0.

=== National leagues ===
In 2011 Fanad United entered a team in the A Championship. They subsequently finished fourth in their group of eight. When the A Championship was disbanded Fanad United joined the League of Ireland U19 Division.

=== Recent years ===
Following the 2020/21 season, Fanad United decided to leave the Ulster Senior League and return to the Donegal league. Despite a year on the sidelines due to COVID-19, they have since enjoyed great success under ex-captain Arthur Lynch. They won the Donegal Junior League 1st division in the 2021/22 season following a thrilling title race with St.Catherines, subsequently earning both teams promotion to the premier division of the Donegal Junior League. The following season Fanad surprised everyone but themselves by winning the Donegal Junior premier division just 12 months after earning promotion to the division. The 2023/24 league campaign would prove no different for Fanad who may have gone into the season slight favourites to retain the title, and they did not disappoint, being crowned champions with two games in hand having only conceded 11 goals in 16 games leading up to the title winning match. Captained by Paddy 'Pud' McGinley, they are the only side to win back to back premier division titles in the last 10 years.

== Ground ==
Fanad United play their home games at Traigh-a-Loch, located between Lough Swilly and Mulroy Bay.

== Managers ==
- (Republic of Ireland) Fr. Michael Sweeney
- (Republic of Ireland) James Doherty
- (Republic of Ireland) Eamon McConigley
- (Republic of Ireland) Ollie Horgan
- (Scotland) Michael Deeney
- (Republic of Ireland) Arthur Lynch
- (Republic of Ireland) Paul Friel

== Honours ==
- Ulster Senior League
  - Winners: 1986–87, 1987–88, 1989–90, 1990–91, 1992–93, 1993–94, 1994–95, 1995–96, 1996–97, 1997–98, 2000–01, 2005–06, 2006–07, 2011: 14
- Ulster Senior League League Cup
  - Winners: 1988–89, 1990–91, 1992–93, 1994–95, 1995–96, 2004–05, 2005–06, 2007, 2008, 2011: 10
  - Runners-up: 1987–88, 1998–99, 1999–2000, 2002–03, 2006–07, 2009 : 6
- FAI Intermediate Cup
  - Winners: 1987–88, 1994–95: 2
  - Runners-up: 1995–96: 1
- FAI Youth Cup
  - Winners: 1978–79:
- Donegal League (1st Division)
  - Winners: 2021–22: 1
- Donegal League
  - Winners: 1972–73, 1973–74, 1974–75, 1979–80, 1983–84, 2022–23, 2023–24: 7
