= 1952 FAI Cup final =

- Event: 1951–52 FAI Cup
Dundalk	Cork Athletic

Final
Dundalk	Cork Athletic
1	1
- Date: 20 April 1952
- Venue: Dalymount Park, Dublin
- Referee: C. Fletcher (Cheshire)
- Attendance: 26,479

Replay
Dundalk	Cork Athletic
3	0
- Date: 23 April 1952
- Venue: Dalymount Park, Dublin
- Referee: C. Fletcher (Cheshire)
- Attendance: 20,753

The 1952 FAI Cup final was the final match of the 1951–52 FAI Cup, a knock-out association football competition contested annually by clubs affiliated with the Football Association of Ireland. It took place on Sunday 20 April 1952 at Dalymount Park in Dublin, and was contested by Cork Athletic and Dundalk. The match finished 1–1, sending the final to a replay the following Wednesday 23 April 1952. Dundalk won the replay 3–0 to win their third FAI Cup.

== Background ==
The two sides' three previous meetings that season had seen one win apiece and one draw. Both sides had poor 1951–52 League of Ireland seasons, finishing 10th and 11th respectively. Dundalk were appearing in their sixth final, and had won the cup in their two previous appearances, having lost the first three. To reach the final, they had defeated St Patrick's Athletic (3–2), non-League AOH from Cork (4–0), then Waterford by coming from 3–1 down in the semi-final replay to win 6–4 in extra time.

Cork Athletic were the cup holders, having won a League and Cup Double the season before, and were appearing in their third final in a row. They had needed a replay to overcome Transport, then defeated Shamrock Rovers (2–1), and Sligo Rovers (4–3) to make the final.

== Match ==
=== Summary ===
A close match was expected, with Cork expected to shade it, due to their cup pedigree and the relative inexperience of Dundalk's side. However Dundalk believed luck was on their side, owing to the manner of their semi-final replay win over Waterford. Cork had the better of the opening half, and took the lead in the second half through Paddy O'Leary, but an injury to goalkeeper Ned Courtney, and sustained Dundalk pressure, resulted in an equaliser for Joe Martin in the 87th minute, to send the final to a replay the following Wednesday evening.

Cork's preparations for the replay were affected when a club director, James Lynch, had to appear in court in the days after the final, charged with attempted murder. A number of club officials and players had to give evidence in the case. Courtney was missing due to the injury received in the first game, which also seemed to impact the Cork team, as Dundalk took the lead in the second minute through Johnny Fearon, Dundalk's only survivor from the 1949 cup-winning team. Cork fought their way back into the match, but Dundalk goalkeeper Walter Durkan was relatively untroubled and the game was put beyond doubt in the 67th minute by a Fergus Moloney shot from distance. In the 83rd minute Paddy Mullen made it 3–0, to win Dundalk's third FAI Cup.

=== Final ===
20 April 1952
15:30

Dundalk	1–1	Cork Athletic
Martin 87'	Report	Paddy O'Leary 51'

Dalymount Park, Dublin
Attendance: 26,479
Referee: C. Fletcher (Cheshire)

Dundalk	Cork Athletic

(Republic of Ireland) Walter Durkan
(Republic of Ireland) Joe Ralph
(Republic of Ireland) Tommy Traynor
(Republic of Ireland) Paddy Gavin
(Republic of Ireland) Mattie Clarke
(Republic of Ireland) Jackie McCourt
(Republic of Ireland) Leo McDonagh
(Northern Ireland) Johnny Fearon
(Republic of Ireland) Joe Martin
(Republic of Ireland) Paddy Mullen
(Republic of Ireland) Fergus Moloney

(Republic of Ireland) Ed Courtney
(Republic of Ireland) Paddy Noonan
(Republic of Ireland) David Noonan
(Republic of Ireland) Johnny Moloney
(Republic of Ireland) Florrie Burke
(Republic of Ireland) Willie Cotter
(Republic of Ireland) Johnny Vaughan
(Republic of Ireland) Murty Broderick
(Republic of Ireland) Paddy O'Leary
(Republic of Ireland) Paddy Cronin
(Republic of Ireland) Jackie Lennox

=== Replay ===
23 April 1952
18:45

Dundalk	3–0	Cork Athletic
Johnny Fearon 2'; Fergus Moloney 67'; Paddy Mullen 83'	Report

Dalymount Park, Dublin
Attendance: 20,753
Referee: C. Fletcher (Cheshire)

Dundalk	Cork Athletic

(Republic of Ireland) Walter Durkan
(Republic of Ireland) Joe Ralph
(Republic of Ireland) Tommy Traynor
(Republic of Ireland) Paddy Gavin
(Republic of Ireland) Mattie Clarke
(Republic of Ireland) Jackie McCourt
(Republic of Ireland) Leo McDonagh
(Northern Ireland) Johnny Fearon
(Republic of Ireland) Joe Martin
(Republic of Ireland) Paddy Mullen
(Republic of Ireland) Fergus Moloney

(Republic of Ireland) Waters
(Republic of Ireland) Paddy Noonan
(Republic of Ireland) David Noonan
(Republic of Ireland) Johnny Moloney
(Republic of Ireland) Florrie Burke
(Republic of Ireland) Willie Cotter
(Republic of Ireland) Johnny Vaughan
(Republic of Ireland) Willie O'Mahony
(Republic of Ireland) Paddy O'Leary
(Republic of Ireland) Paddy Cronin
(Republic of Ireland) Jackie Lennox
