= 1988 Marlboro Cup (Los Angeles) =

The 1988 Marlboro Cup was a four team soccer tournament hosted at the Los Angeles Memorial Coliseum in August. The four teams competing were the League of Ireland XI, Club Universidad de Guadalajara, El Salvador and Guatemala. The League of Ireland XI lost their first game 3–0 against Club Universidad on August 5 with Mick Neville conceding an own goal. They then lost 1–0 to El Salvador in a third place play off two days later. The tournament was won by Guatemala who beat Club Universidad 3–2 in the final.

== Matches ==
Date	Team #1	Result	Team #2	Round
August 5	(Mexico) Universidad de Guadalajara	3–0	(Republic of Ireland) League of Ireland XI	Semi-finals
August 5	El Salvador	1–2	Guatemala	Semi-finals
August 7	El Salvador	1–0	(Republic of Ireland) League of Ireland XI	Third Place Match
August 7	Guatemala	3–2	(Mexico) Universidad de Guadalajara	Final

1988 Los Angeles Marlboro Cup Champions

Guatemala

== Scorers ==
- (Guatemala) Carlos Castañeda 2
- (Guatemala) Byron Pérez 2
- (Mexico) Octavio Mora 2
