= Ryan McBride =

Footballer from Northern Ireland

Personal information
- Date of birth: 15 December 1989
- Place of birth: Derry, Northern Ireland
- Date of death: 19 March 2017 (aged 27)
- Place of death: Derry, Northern Ireland
- Position: Defender

Senior career*
Years	Team	Apps	(Gls)
2007–2009	Institute	0	(0)
2009–2010	Brandywell Harps		
2010–2017	Derry City	131	(9)
- * Club domestic league appearances and goals

Ryan McBride (15 December 1989 – 19 March 2017) was a footballer from Derry, Northern Ireland, who played as a defender for Derry City in the League of Ireland.

== Career ==
After stints with Brandywell Harps in the Derry and District League, Institute and a trial with Gretna, McBride signed for Derry City in February 2010 and broke into the Derry side during the 2011 season. He made his debut for the senior squad against Drogheda on the first day of July 2011. Later that month he was called up to the League of Ireland XI side to take part in the 2011 Dublin Super Cup. When his two-year contract came to an end in 2013, he was offered a renewed contract by new Derry City manager Roddy Collins.

During the 2014 season he was nominated as the League of Ireland player of the week, after scoring two goals against Sligo Rovers to help gain a draw for Derry. In September 2014 he scored in the 2014 FAI Cup quarter-final against Drogheda.

During the 2015 season he became the team captain. Former Derry City skipper, Barry Molloy was quoted in the Derry Journal saying:

I think giving the armband to Ryan McBride was a great decision. He wouldn't be the most vocal player but he's a leader in terms of how he plays and how he conducts himself in training.

In late 2015 multiple websites reported him as the "toughest man in football", after an unusual tackle, that saw him tackle two Cork players at the same time, ended up on YouTube.

In September 2015, he again scored in the FAI Cup quarter-final, scoring a header against Cork.

In November 2015, McBride become one of the first players to be re-signed by Kenny Shiels for the 2016 season. Speaking to the Derry Journal, manager Kenny Shiels talked about McBride saying:

Ryan's a player we feel is not only the captain of the team but is influential and leads by example and we're really pleased to have him on board for next season.

== Death ==
McBride was found dead at his home near Brandywell Stadium on 19 March 2017. Derry City's rearranged match against Limerick, as well as all fixtures for the 2017 League of Ireland Cup first round scheduled for 21 March 2017, were postponed as a mark of respect to McBride. Following McBride's death, Derry renamed their Brandywell Stadium home to the Ryan McBride Brandywell Stadium.

== Career statistics ==
Appearances and goals by club, season and competition
Club	Season	League			National Cup		League Cup		Continental		Other		Total	
Club	Season	Division	Apps	Goals	Apps	Goals	Apps	Goals	Apps	Goals	Apps	Goals	Apps	Goals
Derry City
Derry City	2010	League of Ireland First Division	0	0	0	0	0	0	—		0	0	0	0
Derry City	2011	League of Ireland Premier Division	11	0	0	0	3	0	—		—		14	0
Derry City	2012	League of Ireland Premier Division	23	1	3	0	2	0	—		7	1	35	2
Derry City	2013	League of Ireland Premier Division	28	3	1	0	1	0	—		2	0	32	3
Derry City	2014	League of Ireland Premier Division	22	3	5	1	1	0	2	0	—		30	4
Derry City	2015	League of Ireland Premier Division	23	0	2	1	2	0	4	0	—		31	1
Derry City	2016	League of Ireland Premier Division	20	0	1	0	3	0	—		—		24	0
Derry City	2017	League of Ireland Premier Division	4	2	0	0	0	0	—		—		4	2
Derry City	Total		131	9	12	2	12	0	6	0	9	1	170	12
Career total			131	9	12	2	12	0	6	0	9	1	170	12

== Honours ==
Derry City

- FAI Cup (1): 2012
- League of Ireland Cup (1): 2011
