= 2011 Dublin Super Cup =

Tournament details
- Host country: Ireland
- City: Dublin
- Dates: 30–31 July 2011
- Teams: Four
- Venue: Aviva Stadium

The 2011 Dublin Super Cup was a two-day pre-season football tournament held at the Aviva Stadium, Dublin, Ireland. It was held on 30–31 July 2011 and featured Celtic, F.C. Internazionale, Manchester City and a League of Ireland XI, Manchester City emerged as the winners.

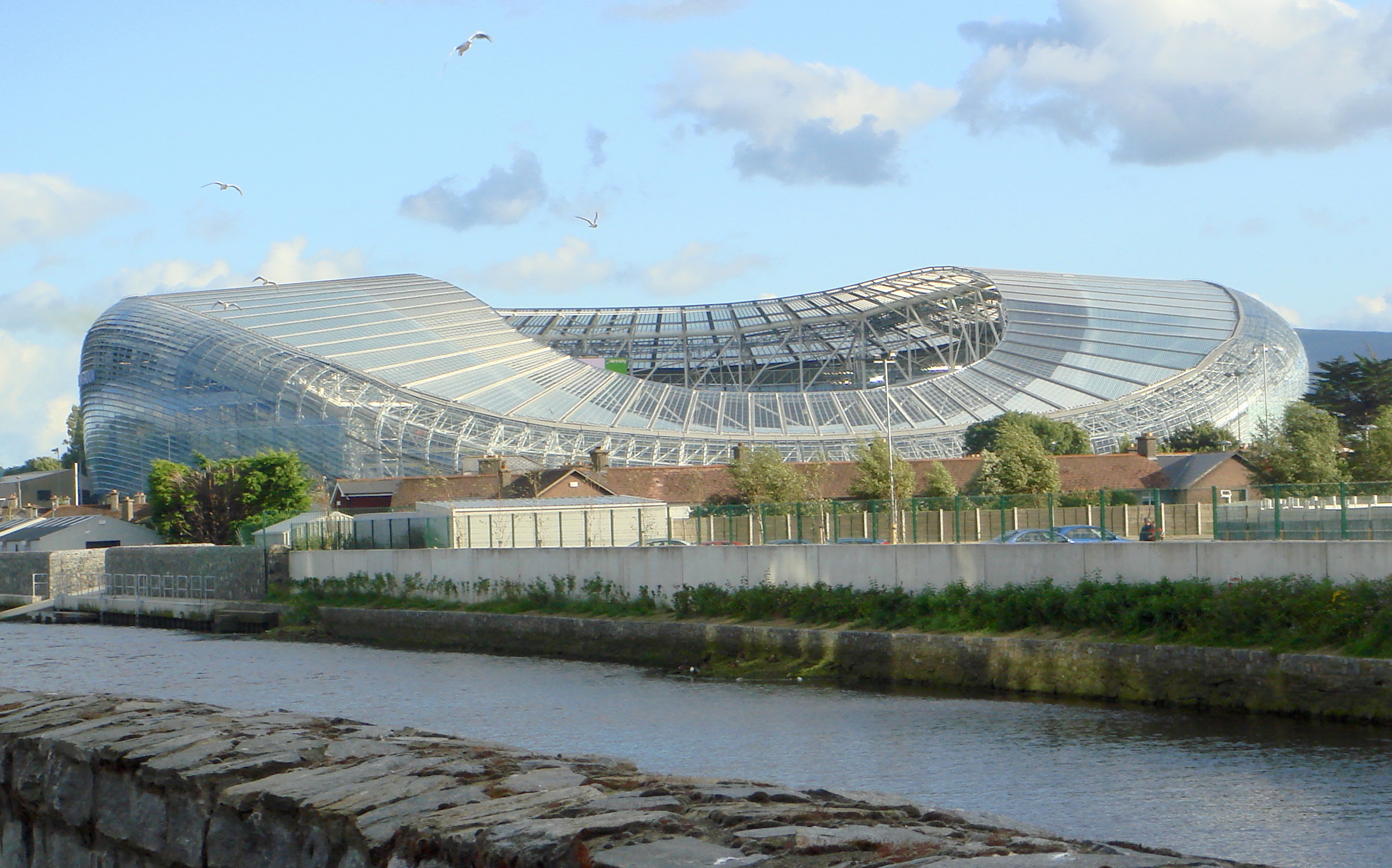
The Aviva Stadium where the Cup is hosted.

== Tournament rules ==
The format is a single table. Each team plays two matches. The four competitors accrue points as follows:

- Three points for a victory
- One point for a draw
- No points for a loss
- One point for each goal scored

== Results ==
=== Table ===
Team	Pld	W	D	L	GF	GA	GD	Pts
(England) Manchester City	2	2	0	0	6	0	+6	12
(Scotland) Celtic	2	1	0	1	5	2	+3	8
(Italy) Internazionale	2	1	0	1	2	3	−1	5
(Republic of Ireland) League of Ireland XI	2	0	0	2	0	8	−8	0

=== Matches ===
30 July 2011
14:00

Manchester City (England)	3 – 0	(Republic of Ireland) League of Ireland XI
Wright-Phillips 52'; Johnson 60'; Scapuzzi 84'	Report

Aviva Stadium, Dublin
Referee: Padraig Sutton (Clare)

30 July 2011
16:30

Internazionale (Italy)	2 – 0	(Scotland) Celtic
Castaignos 7'; Pazzini 45+1'	Report

Aviva Stadium, Dublin
Referee: Damien Hancock (Dublin)

31 July 2011
14:00

League of Ireland XI (Republic of Ireland)	0 – 5	(Scotland) Celtic
	Report	Stokes 38', 87'; Murphy 70' (pen.); Hooper 83', 85'

Aviva Stadium, Dublin
Referee: Neil Doyle (Dublin)

31 July 2011
16:30

Internazionale (Italy)	0 – 3	(England) Manchester City
	Report	Balotelli 45+1'; Džeko 46'; Johnson 90+3'

Aviva Stadium, Dublin
Referee: David McKeon (Dublin)

Scorers

Rank	Name	Team	Goals
1	(England) Gary Hooper	(Scotland) Celtic	2
1	(England) Adam Johnson	(England) Manchester City	2
1	(Republic of Ireland) Anthony Stokes	(Scotland) Celtic	2
2	(Italy) Mario Balotelli	(England) Manchester City	1
2	(Netherlands) Luc Castaignos	(Italy) Inter Milan	1
2	(Bosnia and Herzegovina) Edin Džeko	(England) Manchester City	1
2	(Republic of Ireland) Daryl Murphy	(Scotland) Celtic	1
2	(Italy) Giampaolo Pazzini	(Italy) Inter Milan	1
2	(Italy) Luca Scapuzzi	(England) Manchester City	1
2	(England) Shaun Wright-Phillips	(England) Manchester City	1

== League of Ireland XI squad ==
No.	Pos.	Player	Date of birth (age)	Caps	Goals	Club
1	GK	(Republic of Ireland) Gerard Doherty	24 August 1981 (aged 29)			(Irish Football Association) Derry City
16	GK	(Republic of Ireland) Barry Murphy	8 June 1985 (aged 26)			(Football Association of Ireland) Bohemians
2	DF	(Republic of Ireland) Owen Heary	4 October 1976 (aged 34)			(Football Association of Ireland) Bohemians
	DF	(Republic of Ireland) Simon Madden	1 May 1988 (aged 23)			(Irish Football Association) Derry City
14	DF	(Northern Ireland) Daniel Lafferty	1 April 1989 (aged 22)			(Irish Football Association) Derry City
	DF	(Republic of Ireland) Danny Murphy	4 December 1982 (aged 28)			(Football Association of Ireland) Cork City
	DF	(Scotland) Stewart Greacen	31 March 1982 (aged 29)			(Irish Football Association) Derry City
18	DF	(Republic of Ireland) Shane McEleney	31 January 1991 (aged 20)			(Irish Football Association) Derry City
5	DF	(Republic of Ireland) Ryan McBride	15 December 1989 (aged 21)			(Irish Football Association) Derry City
4	DF	(Republic of Ireland) Aidan Price	8 December 1981 (aged 29)			(Football Association of Ireland) Bohemians
6	DF	(Republic of Ireland) Ger O'Brien	2 July 1984 (aged 27)			(Football Association of Ireland) Bohemians
21	MF	(Republic of Ireland) Gareth McGlynn	29 October 1982 (aged 28)			(Irish Football Association) Derry City
7	MF	(Republic of Ireland) Daniel Kearns	26 August 1991 (aged 19)			(Football Association of Ireland) Dundalk
20	MF	(Republic of Ireland) Stephen McLaughlin	14 June 1990 (aged 21)			(Irish Football Association) Derry City
15	MF	(Northern Ireland) Barry Molloy	29 November 1983 (aged 27)			(Irish Football Association) Derry City
17	MF	(England) Dean Bennett	13 December 1977 (aged 33)			(Football Association of Ireland) Dundalk
19	MF	(Republic of Ireland) John Russell	18 May 1985 (aged 26)			(Football Association of Ireland) Sligo Rovers
8	MF	(Republic of Ireland) Joe Gamble	14 January 1982 (aged 29)			(Football Association of Ireland) Limerick
13	MF	(England) John Dillon	26 August 1991 (aged 19)			(Football Association of Ireland) Sligo Rovers
12	MF	(Northern Ireland) Ruaidhri Higgins	23 October 1984 (aged 26)			(Irish Football Association) Derry City
11	MF	(Republic of Ireland) James McClean	22 April 1989 (aged 22)			(Irish Football Association) Derry City
23	MF	(England) Danny Ventre	23 January 1986 (aged 25)			(Football Association of Ireland) Sligo Rovers
10	FW	(Republic of Ireland) Daryl Kavanagh	11 August 1986 (aged 24)			(Football Association of Ireland) St Patrick's Athletic
9	FW	(Republic of Ireland) (Libya) Eamon Zayed	4 October 1983 (aged 27)			(Irish Football Association) Derry City
22	FW	(Republic of Ireland) Jason Byrne	23 February 1978 (aged 33)			(Football Association of Ireland) Dundalk
