= Aviva Stadium =

Stadium in Dublin, Ireland

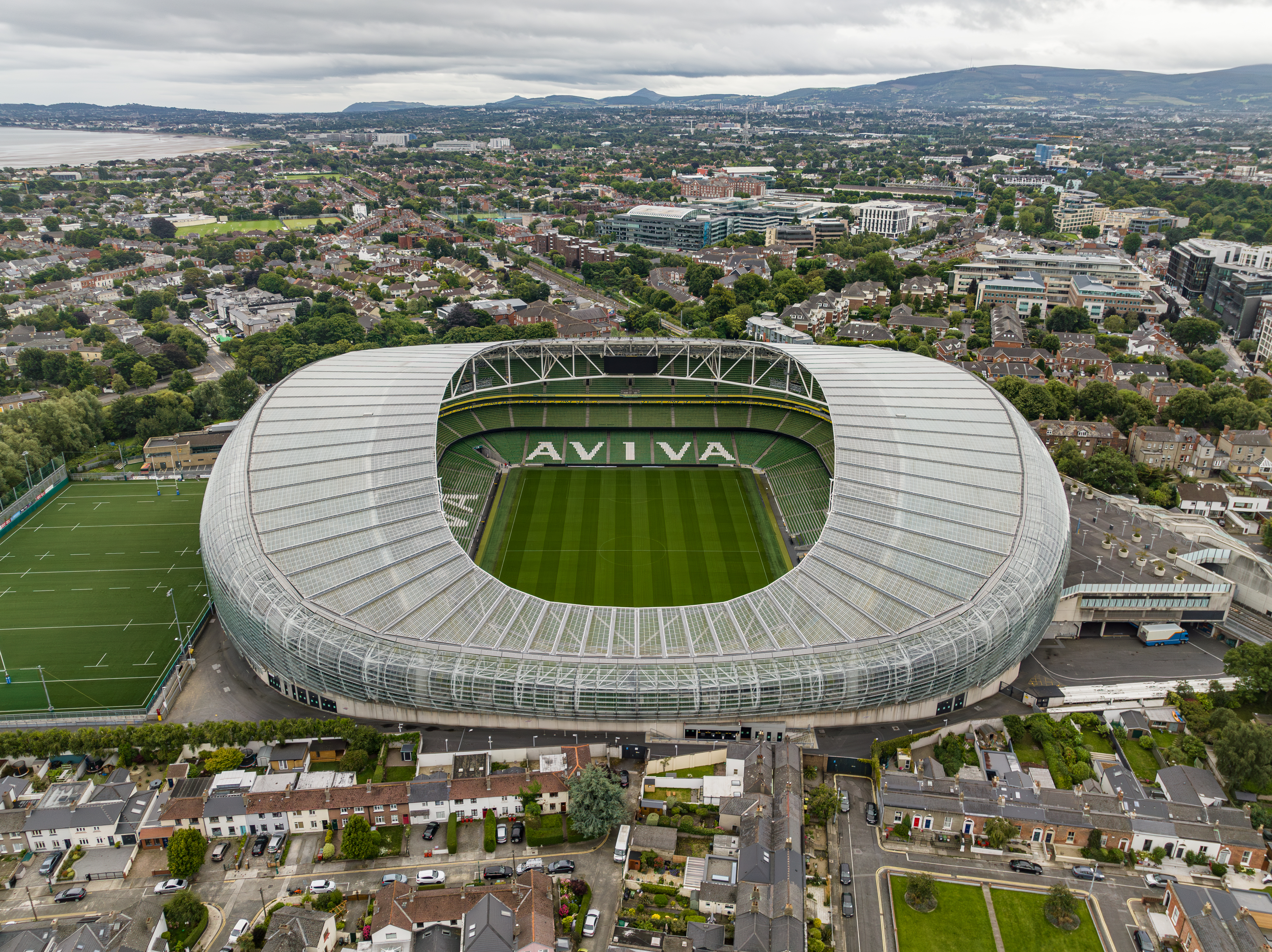
- UEFA

- Location within Dublin
- Former names: • Lansdowne Road • Dublin Arena
- Location: 62 Lansdowne Road; Dublin 4 D04 K5F9; Ireland
- Coordinates: 53°20′7″N 6°13′42″W
- Owner: • Irish Rugby Football Union • Football Association of Ireland
- Operator: New Stadium Ltd
- Capacity: • 51,711 (rugby union, association football) • 49,000 (American football) • 65,000 (concerts)
- Surface: English Ryegrass
- Field size: 106 m × 68 m (348 ft × 223 ft)
- Public transit: Lansdowne Road

Construction
- Groundbreaking: March 2007
- Built: 2007–2010
- Opened: 14 May 2010; 16 years ago
- Cost: €410 million (including €191 million of government funding, 2010)
- Architects: • Populous (formerly HOK Sport) • Scott Tallon Walker
- Builder: Sisk Group
- Structural engineer: Buro Happold
- Services engineer: ME Engineers

Tenants
- Ireland national rugby union team (2010–present); Republic of Ireland national football team (2010–present); Leinster Rugby (2010–present); Lansdowne Football Club (2010–present)

Website
- www.avivastadium.ie

Aviva Stadium, also known as the Dublin Arena (during UEFA competitions), is a sports stadium located in Dublin, Ireland. It has a capacity of 51,711 (all seated). It is built on the site of the former Lansdowne Road Stadium, which was demolished in 2007, and replaced it as home to its chief tenants: the Ireland national rugby union team and the Republic of Ireland football team. The decision to redevelop the stadium came after plans for both Stadium Ireland and Eircom Park fell through. Aviva Group Ireland signed a 10-year deal for the naming rights in 2009, and subsequently extended the arrangement in 2018 and 2025. The deal signed in 2025 runs until 2030.

The stadium, located beside Lansdowne Road railway station, officially opened on 14 May 2010. The stadium was Ireland's first UEFA Category 4 Stadium, and hosted the 2011 and the 2024 UEFA Europa League finals. It also hosted the 2011 Nations Cup, as well as the regular home fixtures of the national rugby team, national football team and some home fixtures for Leinster Rugby and Lansdowne Football Club from 2010 onwards.

Unlike its predecessor, which was solely owned by the Irish Rugby Football Union (IRFU), the current stadium is controlled by the IRFU and the Football Association of Ireland (FAI) through a 50:50 joint venture known as the Lansdowne Road Stadium Development Company (LRSDC). The joint venture has a 60-year lease on the stadium; on expiry the stadium will return to the exclusive ownership of the IRFU.

== History ==
The stadium was officially opened on 14 May 2010 by then Taoiseach Brian Cowen. In 2011, the stadium won a British Construction Industry Award.

During the COVID-19 pandemic, the Irish Army (operating under Operation Fortitude) used the stadium for testing from 14 May onwards, following the handover from the Naval Service (which had been conducting tests under Operation Fortitude at Sir John Rogerson's Quay until that time).

== Rugby union ==
Rugby union matches
Date	Competition	Home	Away	Score	Attendance
31 July 2010	Challenge match	(Ireland) Leinster/Ulster	(Ireland) Munster/Connacht	68–0	35,115
2 October 2010	2010–11 Magners League	Leinster	Munster	13–9	50,645
6 November 2010	Test match	Ireland	South Africa	21–23	35,517
13 November 2010	Test match	Ireland	Samoa	20–10	30,985
20 November 2010	Test match	Ireland	New Zealand	18–38	49,302
28 November 2010	Test match	Ireland	Argentina	29–9	30,476
18 December 2010	2010–11 Heineken Cup pool stage	Leinster	(France) Clermont Auvergne	24–8	44,873
13 February 2011	2011 Six Nations Championship	Ireland	France	22–25	51,700
19 March 2011	2011 Six Nations Championship	Ireland	England	24–8	51,000
9 April 2011	2010–11 Heineken Cup quarter-final	Leinster	(England) Leicester Tigers	17–10	49,762
30 April 2011	2010–11 Heineken Cup semi-final	Leinster	(France) Toulouse	32–23	50,073
20 August 2011	Test match	Ireland	France	22–26	45,165
27 August 2011	Test match	Ireland	England	9–20	48,523
4 November 2011	2011–12 Pro12	Leinster	Munster	24–19	48,365
17 December 2011	2011–12 Heineken Cup pool stage	Leinster	(England) Bath	52–27	46,365
5 February 2012	2012 Six Nations Championship	Ireland	Wales	21–23	51,000
25 February 2012	2012 Six Nations Championship	Ireland	Italy	42–10	51,000
19 March 2012	2012 Six Nations Championship	Ireland	Scotland	32–14	51,000
7 April 2012	2011–12 Heineken Cup quarter-final	Leinster	(Wales) Cardiff Blues	34–3	50,340
28 April 2012	2011–12 Heineken Cup semi-final	Ulster	(Scotland) Edinburgh	22–19	45,147
6 October 2012	2012–13 Pro12	Leinster	Munster	30–21	46,280
10 November 2012	Test match	Ireland	South Africa	12–16	49,781
24 November 2012	Test match	Ireland	Argentina	46–24	43,406
15 December 2012	2012–13 Heineken Cup pool stage	Leinster	(France) Clermont Auvergne	21–28	48,964
10 February 2013	2013 Six Nations Championship	Ireland	England	6–12	51,000
9 March 2013	2013 Six Nations Championship	Ireland	France	13–13	51,000
18 May 2013	2013 Heineken Cup final	(France) Clermont	(France) Toulon	15–16	50,148
9 November 2013	Test match	Ireland	Samoa	40–9	39,108
16 November 2013	Test match	Ireland	Australia	15–32	51,000
24 November 2013	Test match	Ireland	New Zealand	22–24	51,000
14 December 2013	2013–14 Heineken Cup pool stage	Leinster	(England) Northampton Saints	9–18	47,370
2 February 2014	2014 Six Nations Championship	Ireland	Scotland	28–6	51,000
8 February 2014	2014 Six Nations Championship	Ireland	Wales	26–3	51,045
8 March 2014	2014 Six Nations Championship	Ireland	Italy	46–7	52,000
29 March 2014	2013–14 Pro12	Leinster	Munster	22–18	51,700
4 October 2014	2014–15 Pro12	Leinster	Munster	23–34	43,817
8 November 2014	Test match	Ireland	South Africa	29–15	51,100
16 November 2014	Test match	Ireland	Georgia	49–7	40,156
22 November 2014	Test match	Ireland	Australia	26–23	51,100
13 December 2014	2014–15 Rugby Champions Cup pool stage	Leinster	(England) Harlequins	14–13	38,503
14 February 2015	2015 Six Nations Championship	Ireland	France	18–11	51,200
1 March 2015	2015 Six Nations Championship	Ireland	England	19–9	51,200
4 April 2015	2014–15 Rugby Champions Cup quarter-finals	Leinster	(England) Bath	18–12	43,958
15 August 2015	Test match	Ireland	Scotland	28–22	31,780
29 August 2015	Test match	Ireland	Wales	10–16	47,430
19 December 2015	2015–16 Rugby Champions Cup pool stage	Leinster	(France) RC Toulonnais	16–20	44,925
7 February 2016	2016 Six Nations Championship	Ireland	Wales	16–16	51,700
12 March 2016	2016 Six Nations Championship	Ireland	Italy	58–15	51,700
19 March 2016	2016 Six Nations Championship	Ireland	Scotland	35–25	51,700
2 April 2016	2015–16 Pro12	Leinster	Munster	16–13	43,108
8 October 2016	2016–17 Pro12	Leinster	Munster	25–14	40,527
12 November 2016	Test match	Ireland	Canada	52–21	43,000
19 November 2016	Test match	Ireland	New Zealand	9–21	51,700
26 November 2016	Test match	Ireland	Australia	27–24	51,700
17 December 2016	2016–17 Rugby Champions Cup pool stage	Leinster	(England) Northampton Saints	60–13	38,584
25 February 2017	2017 Six Nations Championship	Ireland	France	19–9	51,700
18 March 2017	2017 Six Nations Championship	Ireland	England	13–9	51,700
1 April 2017	2016–17 European Rugby Champions Cup	Leinster	(England) Wasps	32–17	50,226
22 April 2017	2016–17 European Rugby Champions Cup	Munster	(England) Saracens	10–26	51,300
27 May 2017	2017 Pro12 Grand Final	Munster	(Wales) Scarlets	22–46	44,558
7 October 2017	2016–17 Pro12	Leinster	Munster	23–17	46,374
11 November 2017	Test match	Ireland	South Africa	38–3	51,700
18 November 2017	Test match	Ireland	Fiji	23–20	51,000
25 November 2017	Test match	Ireland	Argentina	28–19	51,000
16 December 2017	2017–18 Rugby Champions Cup pool stage	Leinster	(England) Exeter Chiefs	22–17	40,604
10 February 2018	2018 Six Nations Championship	Ireland	Italy	56–19	51,700
24 February 2018	2018 Six Nations Championship	Ireland	Wales	37–27	51,700
8 March 2018	2018 Six Nations Championship	Ireland	Scotland	28–8	51,700
1 April 2018	2017–18 Rugby Champions Cup quarter-finals	Leinster	(England) Saracens	30–19	51,700
21 April 2018	2017–18 Rugby Champions Cup Semi-finals	Leinster	(Wales) Scarlets	38–16	48,455
26 May 2018	2018 Pro14 Grand Final	Leinster	(Wales) Scarlets	40–32	46,092
6 October 2018	2018–19 Pro14	Leinster	Munster	30–22	50,120
10 November 2018	Test match	Ireland	Argentina	28–17	51,700
17 November 2018	Test match	Ireland	New Zealand	16–9	51,700
24 November 2018	Test match	Ireland	United States	57–14	51,000
15 December 2018	2018–19 Rugby Champions Cup pool stage	Leinster	(England) Bath	42–15	40,261
2 February 2019	2019 Six Nations Championship	Ireland	England	20–32	51,000
10 March 2019	2019 Six Nations Championship	Ireland	France	26–14	51,000
30 March 2019	2018–19 Rugby Champions Cup quarter-finals	Leinster	Ulster	21–18	51,700
21 April 2019	2018–19 Rugby Champions Cup Semi-finals	Leinster	(France) Toulouse	30–12	42,960
10 August 2019	Test match	Ireland	Italy	29–10	30,000
7 September 2019	Test match	Ireland	Wales	19–10	50,000
14 December 2019	2018–19 Rugby Champions Cup pool stage	Leinster	(England) Northampton Saints	50–21	42,041
1 February 2020	2020 Six Nations Championship	Ireland	Scotland	19–12	51,700
8 February 2020	2020 Six Nations Championship	Ireland	Wales	24–14	51,700
22 August 2020	2019–20 Pro14	Leinster	Munster	27–25	0*
23 August 2020	2019–20 Pro14	Connacht	Ulster	26–20	0*
29 August 2020	2019–20 Pro14	Ulster	Leinster	10–28	0*
30 August 2020	2019–20 Pro14	Munster	Connacht	49–12	0*
4 September 2020	2019–20 Pro14 semi-finals	Leinster	Munster	13–3	0*
12 September 2020	2020 Pro14 Grand Final	Leinster	Ulster	27–5	0*
19 September 2020	2019–20 Rugby Champions Cup quarter-finals	Leinster	(England) Saracens	17–25	0*
24 October 2020	2020 Six Nations Championship	Ireland	Italy	50–17	0*
13 November 2020	Autumn Nations Cup	Ireland	Wales	32–9	0*
29 November 2020	Autumn Nations Cup	Ireland	Georgia	23–10	0*
5 December 2020	Autumn Nations Cup	Ireland	Scotland	31–16	0*
14 February 2021	2021 Six Nations Championship	Ireland	France	13–15	0*
20 March 2021	2021 Six Nations Championship	Ireland	England	32–18	0*
3 July 2021	Test match	Ireland	Japan	39–31	3,000*
10 July 2021	Test match	Ireland	United States	71–10	6,000*
25 September 2021	2021–22 United Rugby Championship	Leinster	(South Africa) Bulls	31–3	19,419*
23 October 2021	2021–22 United Rugby Championship	Connacht	Ulster	36–11	9,175
6 November 2021	Test match	Ireland	Japan	60–5	40,000
13 November 2021	Test match	Ireland	New Zealand	29–20	51,700
21 November 2021	Test match	Ireland	Argentina	53–7	45,500
11 December 2021	2021–22 Rugby Champions pool stage	Leinster	(England) Bath	45–20	25,403
5 February 2022	2022 Six Nations Championship	Ireland	Wales	29–7	51,700
27 February 2022	2022 Six Nations Championship	Ireland	Italy	57–6	51,000
19 March 2022	2022 Six Nations Championship	Ireland	Scotland	26–5	51,000
15 April 2022	2021–22 Rugby Champions Cup Round of 16	Leinster	Connacht	56–20	32,604
1 May 2022	All-Ireland League Division 1A Final	(Leinster) Clontarf	(Leinster) Terenure College	29–23	5,788
7 May 2022	2021–22 Rugby Champions Cup quarter-finals	Munster	(France) Toulouse	24–24 (a.e.t.) 2–4	40,479
15 May 2022	2021–22 Rugby Champions Cup Semi-finals	Leinster	(France) Toulouse	40–17	42,067
21 May 2022	2021–22 United Rugby Championship	Leinster	Munster	35–25	32,411
22 October 2022	2022–23 United Rugby Championship	Leinster	Munster	27–13	45,436
5 November 2022	Test match	Ireland	South Africa	19–16	51,700
12 November 2022	Test match	Ireland	Fiji	35–17	51,700
19 November 2022	Test match	Ireland	Australia	13–10	51,700
17 December 2022	2022–23 European Rugby Champions Cup pool stage	Ulster	(France) Stade Rochelais	29–36	0
21 January 2023	2022–23 European Rugby Champions Cup pool stage	Leinster	(France) Racing 92	36–10	43,560
11 February 2023	2023 Six Nations Championship	Ireland	France	32–19	51,700
18 March 2023	2023 Six Nations Championship	Ireland	England	29–16	51,700
1 April 2023	2022–23 European Rugby Champions Round of 16	Leinster	Ulster	30–15	51,700
7 April 2023	2022–23 European Rugby Champions Quarter-finals	Leinster	(England) Leicester Tigers	55–24	27,000
29 April 2023	2022–23 European Rugby Champions Semi-finals	Leinster	(France) Toulouse	41–22	46,823
6 May 2023	2022–23 United Rugby Championship quarter-final	Leinster	(South Africa) Sharks	35–5	14,642
7 May 2023	All-Ireland League Division 1A Final	(Leinster) Terenure College	(Leinster) Clontarf	50–24	8,642
13 May 2023	2022–23 United Rugby Championship semi-final	Leinster	Munster	15–16	26,795
20 May 2023	European Rugby Champions Cup final	Leinster	(France) Stade Rochelais	26–27	51,711
5 August 2023	World Cup warm-up matches	Ireland	Italy	33–17	
19 August 2023	World Cup warm-up matches	Ireland	England	29–10	51,000
25 November 2023	2023–24 United Rugby Championship	Leinster	Munster	21–16	49,246
13 January 2024	2023–24 European Rugby Champions Cup pool stage	Leinster	(France) Stade Français Paris	43–7	42,003
11 February 2024	2024 Six Nations Championship	Ireland	Italy	36–0	51,700
24 February 2024	2024 Six Nations Championship	Ireland	Wales	31–7	51,700
16 March 2024	2024 Six Nations Championship	Ireland	Scotland	17–13	51,700
6 April 2024	European Rugby Champions Cup Round of 16	Leinster	(England) Leicester Tigers	36–22	40,775
13 April 2024	European Rugby Champions Cup Quarter-finals	Leinster	(France) La Rochelle	40–13	51,700
28 April 2024	All-Ireland League Division 1A Final	(Munster) Cork Constitution	(Leinster) Terenure College	33–22	7,768
8 June 2024	2024–25 United Rugby Championship quarter-finals	Leinster	Ulster	43–20	18,174
27 September 2024	2024–25 United Rugby Championship	Leinster	(Wales) Dragons RFC	34–6	18,397
26 October 2024	2024–25 United Rugby Championship	Leinster	(South Africa) Lions	24–6	20,945
8 November 2024	Test match	Ireland	New Zealand	13–23	51,700
15 November 2024	Test match	Ireland	Argentina	22–19	51,700
23 November 2024	Test match	Ireland	Fiji	52–17	51,700
30 November 2024	Test match	Ireland	Australia	22–19	51,700
14 December 2024	2024–25 European Rugby Champions Cup pool stage	Leinster	(France) ASM Clermont Auvergne	15–7	34,184
21 December 2024	2024–25 United Rugby Championship	Leinster	Connacht	20–12	33,963
19 January 2025	2024–25 European Rugby Champions Cup pool stage	Leinster	(England) Bath	47–21	40,195
25 January 2025	2024–25 United Rugby Championship	Leinster	(South Africa) Stormers	36–12	18,892
1 February 2025	2025 Six Nations Championship	Ireland	England	27–22	51,700
1 March 2025	2024–25 United Rugby Championship	Leinster	(Wales) Cardiff Rugby	42–24	17,951
8 March 2025	2025 Six Nations Championship	Ireland	France	27–42	51,700
12 April 2025	European Rugby Champions Cup Quarter-finals	Leinster	(Scotland) Glasgow Warriors	52–0	22,400
19 April 2025	2024–25 United Rugby Championship	Leinster	Ulster	41–17	18,442
27 April 2025	All-Ireland League Division 1A Final	(Leinster) Clontarf F.C.	(Munster) Cork Constitution	22–21	
3 May 2025	European Rugby Champions Cup Semi-finals	Leinster	(England) Northampton Saints	34–37	42,207
10 May 2025	2024–25 United Rugby Championship	Leinster	(Italy) Zebre	76–5	14,681
17 May 2025	2024–25 United Rugby Championship	Leinster	(Scotland) Glasgow Warriors	13–5	17,654
31 May 2025	2024–25 United Rugby Championship	Leinster	(Wales) Scarlets	33–21	12,879
20 June 2025	2025 British & Irish Lions tour to Australia	British & Irish Lions	Argentina	24–28	51,700
11 October 2025	2025–26 United Rugby Championship	Leinster	(South Africa) Sharks	31–5	17,549
25 October 2025	2025–26 United Rugby Championship	Leinster	(Italy) Zebre Parma	50–26	14,128
8 November 2025	Test match	Ireland	Japan	41–10	50,060
15 November 2025	Test match	Ireland	Australia	46–19	51,700
22 November 2025	Test match	Ireland	South Africa	13–24	51,700
6 December 2025	European Rugby Champions Cup pool stage	Leinster	(England) Harlequin F.C.	45–28	22,298
19 December 2025	2025–26 United Rugby Championship	Leinster	Ulster	24–20	22,011
3 January 2026	2025–26 United Rugby Championship	Leinster	Connacht	52–17	21,722
10 January 2026	European Rugby Champions Cup pool stage	Leinster	(France) Stade Rochelais	25–24	38,044
31 January 2026	2025–26 United Rugby Championship	Leinster	(Scotland) Edinburgh	28–20	18,368
14 February 2026	2026 Six Nations Championship	Ireland	Italy	20–13	51,700
6 March 2026	2026 Six Nations Championship	Ireland	Wales	27–17	51,700
14 March 2026	2026 Six Nations Championship	Ireland	Scotland	43–21	51,700
27 March 2026	2025–26 United Rugby Championship	Leinster	(Wales) Scarlets	36–19	15,301
5 April 2026	European Rugby Champions Cup Round of 16	Leinster	(Scotland) Edinburgh	49–31	21,491
11 April 2026	European Rugby Champions Cup Quarter-finals	Leinster	(England) Sale Sharks	43–13	18,833
26 April 2026	All-Ireland League Division 1A Final	(Leinster) St Mary's College RFC	(Leinster) Clontarf F.C.	46–31	6,894
2 May 2026	European Rugby Champions Cup Semi-finals	Leinster	(France) RC Toulon	29–25	38,555
9 May 2026	2025–26 United Rugby Championship	Leinster	(South Africa) Lions	31–7	16,259
16 May 2026	2025–26 United Rugby Championship	Leinster	(Wales) Ospreys	68–14	15,104
30 May 2026	2025–26 United Rugby Championship	Leinster	(South Africa) Lions	59–10	9,493
6 June 2026	2025–26 United Rugby Championship	Leinster	(South Africa) Stormers	20–11	15,346
24 October 2026	2026–27 United Rugby Championship	Leinster	Munster	24–18	37,193
6 November 2026	2026 Nations Championship	Ireland	Argentina	42–12	49,165
14 November 2026	2026 Nations Championship	Ireland	Fiji	43–15	
Row colours: green for club matches, yellow for international ones
^{*}Denotes match in which COVID-19 restrictions limited attendance

=== Internationals ===
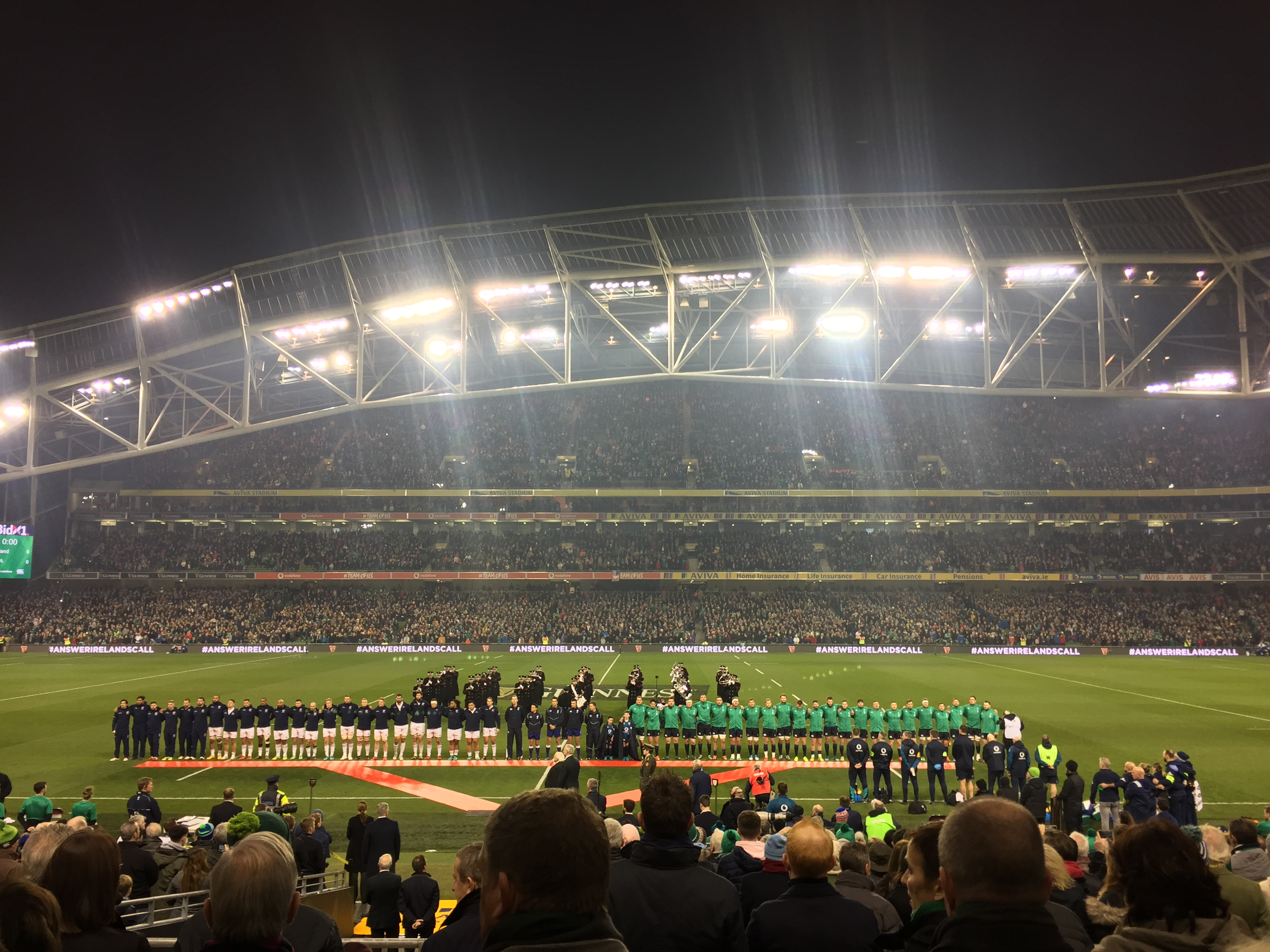
The stadium during a match between Ireland and the United States

The Ireland national rugby union team plays its home games at the stadium, as it did previously at Lansdowne Road, taking over from their temporary home, Croke Park, where games were played during Aviva's construction. Ireland's first international game was on 6 November 2010 against South Africa, with the Springboks winning 23–21. The game drew a crowd of 35,515, mainly due to a backlash by Ireland supporters over the IRFU's controversial ticketing strategy for the November Test series. Initially, the IRFU announced that tickets to the November Tests would only be sold as packages for all four matches. Later, it announced that the tickets would instead be split into two packages, with the South Africa Test bundled with the following week's match with Samoa for a minimum of €150, and the New Zealand and Argentina Tests bundled for a minimum of €190. Single-game tickets were to be available only for the Samoa and Argentina Tests. On 1 November, the IRFU backed away from this plan amid heavy criticism from member clubs that had problems selling the packages in a difficult economy.

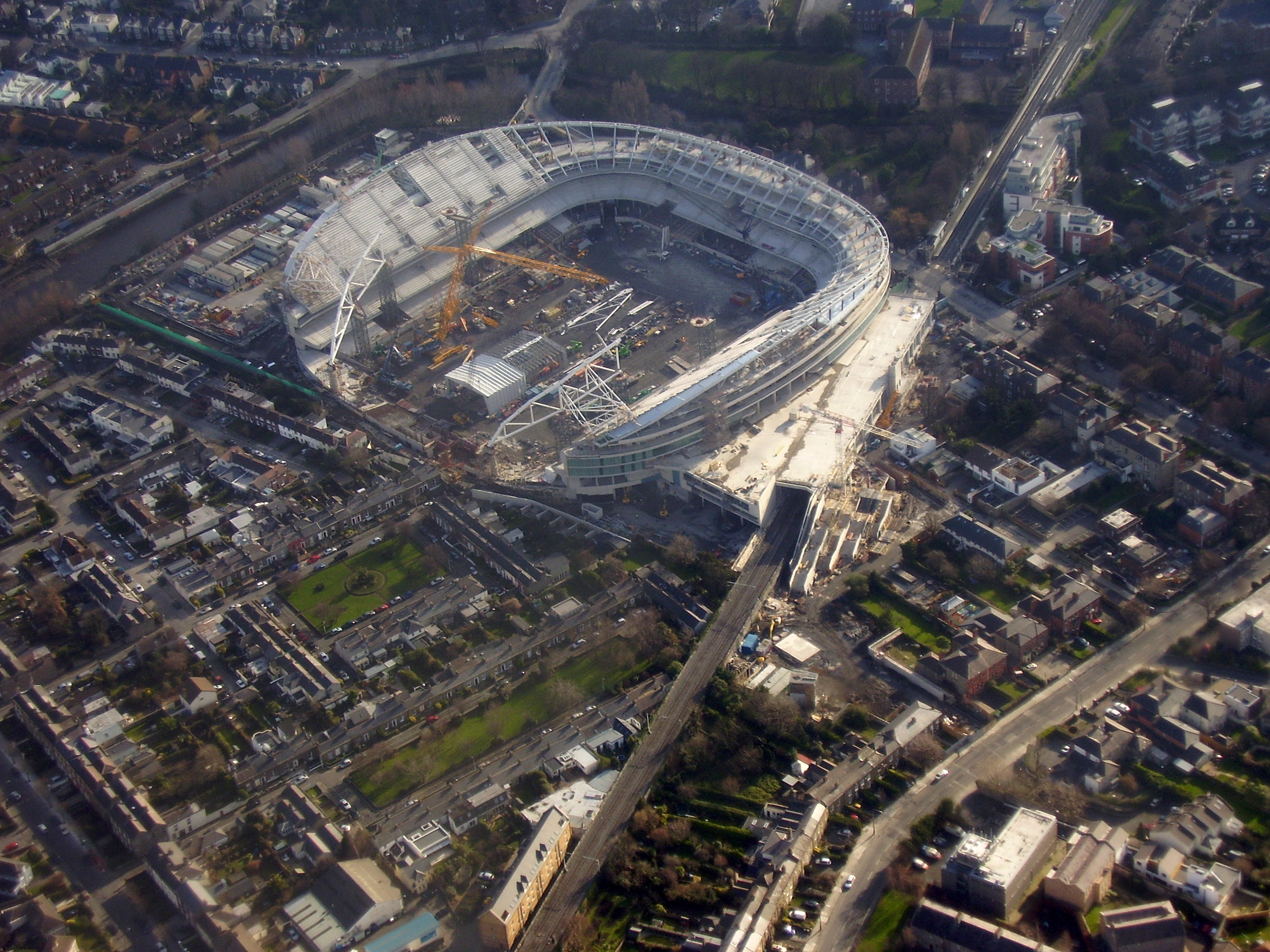
Lansdowne Road was replaced by the Aviva Stadium, shown here during construction

The first rugby union game at the Aviva was an exhibition game on 31 July 2010, billed as the O_{2} Challenge, involving under-18 and under-20 players from all four of Ireland's provincial sides, with a Leinster/Ulster side defeating a Munster/Connacht combination 68–0. As part of the run-up to the event, O_{2} ran a promotion which gave the winner the opportunity to attempt to score the ceremonial first points at the Aviva via a simulated conversion kick on the day before the match. The winner of the promotion, John Baker of Ennis, was successful. The first official points at the Aviva were scored by Ulster's Craig Gilroy with a try in the O_{2} Challenge.

Ireland won twelve consecutive matches at the Aviva between 2016 and 2018. They bested that record achieving their 13th consecutive home win in week two of the 2023 Six Nations Championship. Ireland extended that record to 14 straight wins and achieved their 4th ever Grand Slam in 29–16 victory over England on 18 March 2023. Ireland beat Scotland at the Aviva on 16 March 2024, to become back-to-back Six Nations outright champions for only the third time in history, extending their record of 19 consecutive home wins. New Zealand defeated Ireland 13–23, breaking their 19 match home winning streak which spanned from February 2021 until November 2024.

Ireland's record at the Aviva
Competition	Played	Won	Drawn	Lost	% Won
Test Match	49	38	0	11	77.55%
Six Nations	40	32	2	6	80%
Total	89	70	2	17	78.65%

Updated 15 November 2026

=== Club competition ===
The stadium also hosts some home games for Leinster when the RDS Arena's smaller capacity does not satisfy demand. Leinster won their opening home game in the Aviva against Munster 13–9, in the Celtic League (now United Rugby Championship) season, in front of a then record league attendance of 50,645. This league record was exceeded on 29 March 2014 when Leinster again beat Munster, 22–18, in front of 51,700 people.

Leinster won their first Heineken Cup game in the stadium 24–8, against Clermont Auvergne in a pool game during the 2010–11 season. During Leinster's successful run to the Heineken Cup title that season, they took their quarter-final and semi-final matches to the stadium, defeating Leicester Tigers and Toulouse respectively. Ulster took their 2012 Heineken Cup semi-final to the stadium as well, defeating Edinburgh.

The 2013 Heineken Cup final took place in the stadium on 18 May 2013 where Toulon beat Clermont Auvergne 16–15. The Heineken Cup final had last been held in Dublin in 2003, when Toulouse beat Perpignan 22–17 at Lansdowne Road in front of 28,600.

The stadium hosted a second European Champions Cup final in 2023 when La Rochelle beat Leinster 27–26.

Leinster's record at the Aviva
Competition	Played	Won	Drawn	Lost	% Won
United Rugby Championship	41	39	0	2	95.12%
European Rugby Champions Cup	40	34	0	6	85%
Total	81	73	0	8	90.12%

Updated 27 October 2026

== Association football ==
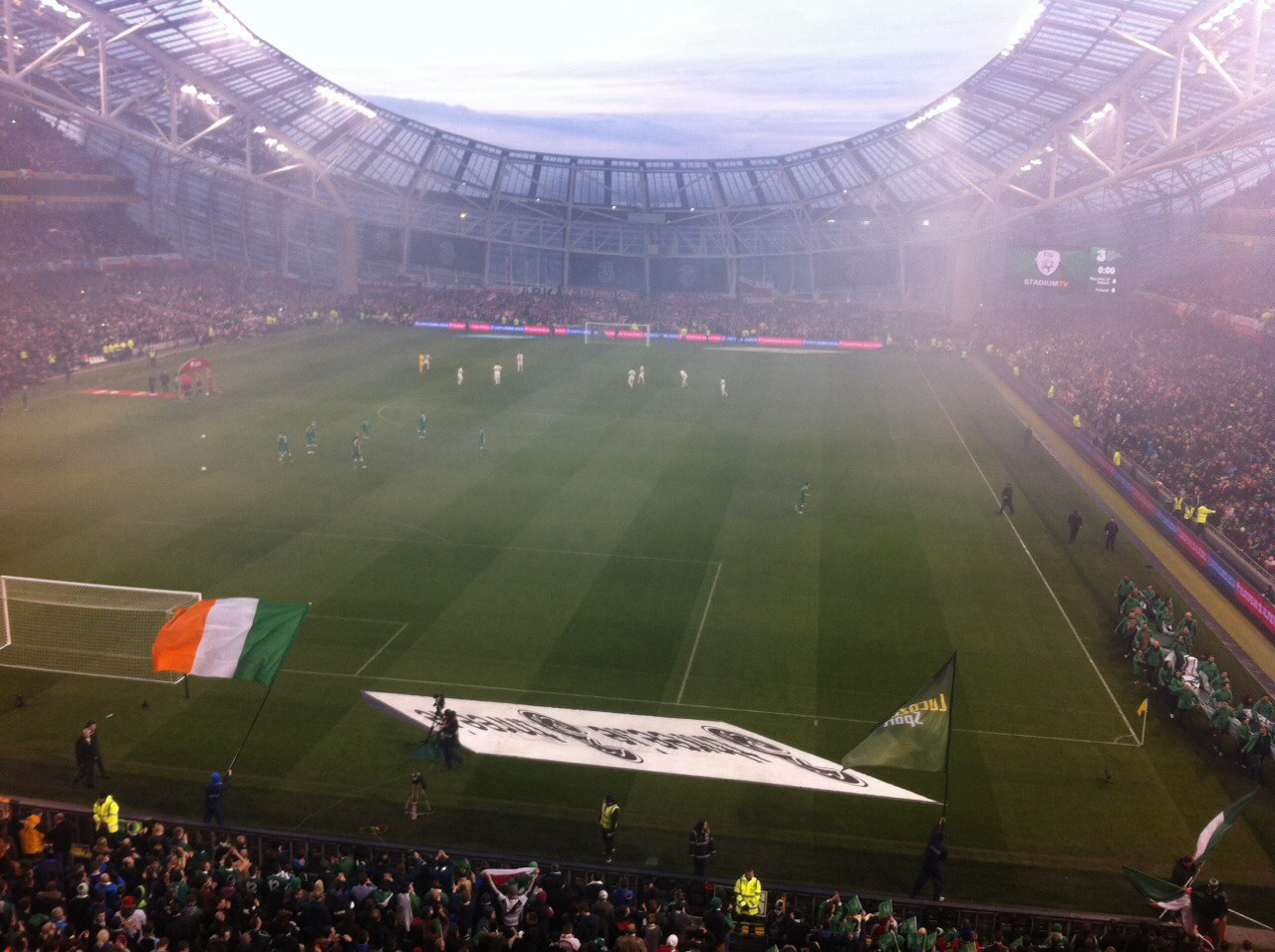
Ireland vs. Poland Euro 2016 Qualifier

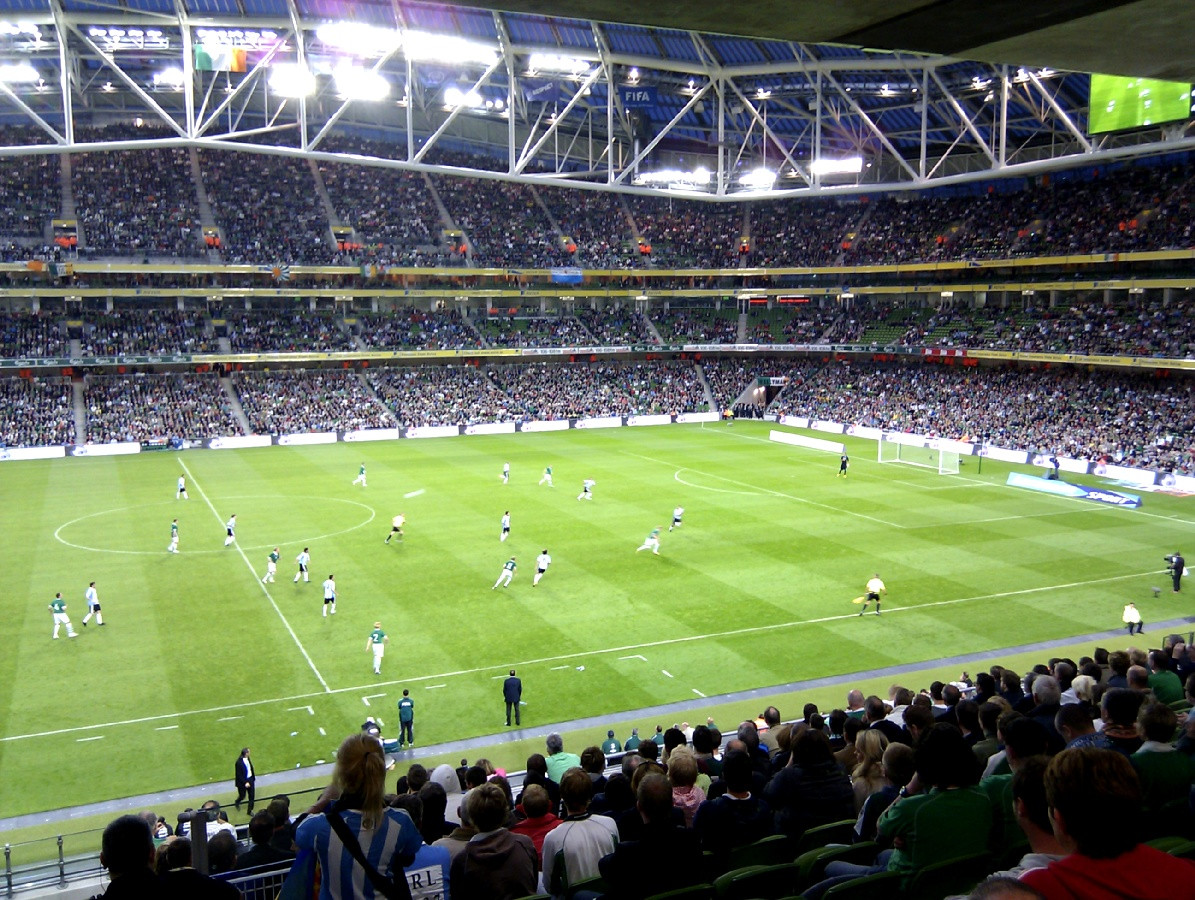
Ireland vs. Argentina from 2010

Football matches
Date	Competition	Home	Away	Score	Attendance
31 July 2010	Challenge Match	(Republic of Ireland) League of Ireland XI	(England) Manchester United	1–7	49,861
11 August 2010	Friendly	Republic of Ireland	Argentina	0–1	45,200
7 September 2010	Euro 2012 qualification	Republic of Ireland	Andorra	3–1	40,283
8 October 2010	Euro 2012 qualification	Republic of Ireland	Russia	2–3	50,411
14 November 2010	2010 FAI Cup Final	(Republic of Ireland) Sligo Rovers	(Republic of Ireland) Shamrock Rovers	0–0 (aet) (2–0 pens)	36,101
17 November 2010	Friendly	Republic of Ireland	Norway	1–2	25,000
8 February 2011	2011 Nations Cup	Republic of Ireland	Wales	3–0	19,783
9 February 2011	2011 Nations Cup	Scotland	Northern Ireland	3–0	18,742
26 March 2011	Euro 2012 qualification	Republic of Ireland	North Macedonia	2–1	30,000
29 March 2011	Friendly	Republic of Ireland	Uruguay	2–3	25,611
18 May 2011	2011 UEFA Europa League Final	(Portugal) Porto	(Portugal) Braga	1–0	45,391
24 May 2011	2011 Nations Cup	Republic of Ireland	Northern Ireland	5–0	15,083
25 May 2011	2011 Nations Cup	Wales	Scotland	1–3	6,036
27 May 2011	2011 Nations Cup	Wales	Northern Ireland	2–0	529
29 May 2011	2011 Nations Cup	Republic of Ireland	Scotland	1–0	17,694
30 July 2011	Dublin Super Cup	(Italy) Inter Milan	(Scotland) Celtic	2–0	
30 July 2011	Dublin Super Cup	(England) Manchester City	(Republic of Ireland) League of Ireland XI	3–0	
31 July 2011	Dublin Super Cup	(Republic of Ireland) League of Ireland XI	(Scotland) Celtic	0–5	
31 July 2011	Dublin Super Cup	(Italy) Inter Milan	(England) Manchester City	0–3	
10 August 2011	Friendly	Republic of Ireland	Croatia	0–0	20,179
2 September 2011	Euro 2012 qualification	Republic of Ireland	Slovakia	0–0	44,761
11 October 2011	Euro 2012 qualification	Republic of Ireland	Armenia	2–1	45,200
6 November 2011	2011 FAI Cup Final	(Republic of Ireland) Shelbourne	(Republic of Ireland) Sligo Rovers	1–1 (aet) (1–4 pens)	21,662
15 November 2011	Euro 2012 play-offs	Republic of Ireland	Estonia	1–1	51,151
29 February 2012	Friendly	Republic of Ireland	Czech Republic	1–1	37,741
26 May 2012	Friendly	Republic of Ireland	Bosnia and Herzegovina	1–0	37,100
12 October 2012	2014 World Cup qualification	Republic of Ireland	Germany	1–6	49,850
4 November 2012	2012 FAI Cup Final	(Republic of Ireland) Derry City	(Republic of Ireland) St Patrick's Athletic	3–2 (aet)	16,117
14 November 2012	Friendly	Republic of Ireland	Greece	0–1	16,256
6 February 2013	Friendly	Republic of Ireland	Poland	2–0	43,112
26 March 2013	2014 World Cup qualification	Republic of Ireland	Austria	2–2	50,000
2 June 2013	2013 FAI Junior Cup Final	(Republic of Ireland) Sheriff YC	(Republic of Ireland) Kilbarrack United	0–0 (aet) (5–4 pens)	
7 June 2013	2014 World Cup qualification	Republic of Ireland	Faroe Islands	3–0	19,000
10 August 2013	Friendly	(England) Liverpool	(Scotland) Celtic	0–1	51,000
6 September 2013	2014 World Cup qualification	Republic of Ireland	Sweden	1–2	49,500
15 October 2013	2014 World Cup qualification	Republic of Ireland	Kazakhstan	3–1	21,700
3 November 2013	2013 FAI Women's Cup Final	(Republic of Ireland) Raheny United	(Republic of Ireland) Castlebar Celtic	3–2 (aet)	
3 November 2013	2013 FAI Cup Final	(Republic of Ireland) Drogheda United	(Republic of Ireland) Sligo Rovers	2–3	17,753
15 November 2013	Friendly	Republic of Ireland	Latvia	3–0	37,100
5 March 2014	Friendly	Republic of Ireland	Serbia	1–2	37,243
14 May 2014	Friendly	(England) Liverpool	(Republic of Ireland) Shamrock Rovers	4–0	42,517
25 May 2014	2014 FAI Junior Cup Final	(Republic of Ireland) Ballynanty Rovers	(Republic of Ireland) St Michael's	0–4	
25 May 2014	Friendly	Republic of Ireland	Turkey	1–2	22,000
3 September 2014	Friendly	Republic of Ireland	Oman	2–0	14,376
11 October 2014	Euro 2016 qualification	Republic of Ireland	Gibraltar	7–0	35,123
2 November 2014	2014 FAI Women's Cup Final	(Republic of Ireland) Raheny United	(Republic of Ireland) UCD Waves	2–1 (aet)	
2 November 2014	2014 FAI Cup Final	(Republic of Ireland) Derry City	(Republic of Ireland) St Patrick's Athletic	0–2	17,038
18 November 2014	Friendly	Republic of Ireland	United States	4–1	23,000
29 March 2015	Euro 2016 qualification	Republic of Ireland	Poland	1–1	50,500
17 May 2015	2015 FAI Junior Cup Final	(Republic of Ireland) Sheriff YC	(Republic of Ireland) Liffey Wanderers	1–2 (aet)	
17 May 2015	2015 FAI Intermediate Cup Final	(Republic of Ireland) Tolka Rovers	(Republic of Ireland) Crumlin United	0–4	250
5 June 2015	Friendly	Republic of Ireland	Northern Ireland	0–0	50
7 June 2015	Friendly	Republic of Ireland	England	0–0	43,486
13 June 2015	Euro 2016 qualification	Republic of Ireland	Scotland	1–1	49,063
8 October 2015	Euro 2016 qualification	Republic of Ireland	Germany	1–0	50,604
8 November 2015	2015 FAI Women's Cup Final	(Republic of Ireland) Wexford Youths	(Republic of Ireland) Shelbourne	2–2 (aet) (4–2 pens)	
8 November 2015	2015 FAI Cup Final	(Republic of Ireland) Cork City	(Republic of Ireland) Dundalk	0–1 (aet)	25,103
16 November 2015	Euro 2016 qualification	Republic of Ireland	Bosnia and Herzegovina	2–0	51,000
25 March 2016	Friendly	Republic of Ireland	Switzerland	1–0	35,450
29 March 2016	Friendly	Republic of Ireland	Slovakia	2–2	30,217
14 May 2016	2016 FAI Junior Cup Final	(Republic of Ireland) Sheriff YC	(Republic of Ireland) Pike Rovers	1–0	
14 May 2016	2016 FAI Intermediate Cup Final	(Republic of Ireland) Crumlin United	(Republic of Ireland) Letterkenny Rovers	5–0	3,106
27 May 2016	Friendly	Republic of Ireland	Netherlands	1–1	42,438
30 July 2016	Friendly	(Scotland) Celtic	(Spain) Barcelona	1–3	47,900
17 August 2016	UEFA Champions League Play-off	(Republic of Ireland) Dundalk	(Poland) Legia Warsaw	0–2	30,417
31 August 2016	Friendly	Republic of Ireland	Oman	4–0	27,000
6 October 2016	2018 World Cup qualification	Republic of Ireland	Georgia	1–0	39,793
6 November 2016	2016 FAI Women's Cup Final	(Republic of Ireland) Shelbourne	(Republic of Ireland) Wexford Youths	5–0	800
6 November 2016	2016 FAI Cup Final	(Republic of Ireland) Cork City	(Republic of Ireland) Dundalk	1–0 (aet)	26,400
24 March 2017	2018 World Cup qualification	Republic of Ireland	Wales	0–0	49,989
28 March 2017	Friendly	Republic of Ireland	Iceland	0–1	37,241
13 May 2017	2017 FAI Junior Cup Final	(Republic of Ireland) Sheriff YC	(Republic of Ireland) Evergreen	2–0	3,500
13 May 2017	2017 FAI Intermediate Cup Final	(Republic of Ireland) Cobh Ramblers	(Republic of Ireland) Liffey Wanderers	2–2 (aet) (4–5 pens)	3,500
4 June 2017	Friendly	Republic of Ireland	Uruguay	3–1	27,193
11 June 2017	2018 World Cup qualification	Republic of Ireland	Austria	1–1	50,000
2 August 2017	Friendly	(England) Manchester United	(Italy) U.C. Sampdoria	2–1	51,700
5 August 2017	Friendly	(England) Liverpool	(Spain) Athletic Bilbao	3–1	51,333
5 September 2017	2018 World Cup qualification	Republic of Ireland	Serbia	0–1	50,153
6 October 2017	2018 World Cup qualification	Republic of Ireland	Moldova	2–0	50,560
5 November 2017	2017 FAI Women's Cup Final	(Republic of Ireland) Cork City	(Republic of Ireland) UCD Waves	1–0	
5 November 2017	2017 FAI Cup Final	(Republic of Ireland) Dundalk	(Republic of Ireland) Cork City	0–0 (aet) (3–5 pens)	24,210
6 October 2017	2018 World Cup qualification Playoff	Republic of Ireland	Denmark	1–5	50,000
12 May 2018	2018 FAI Junior Cup Final	(Republic of Ireland) Pike Rovers	(Republic of Ireland) North End United	1–1 (aet) (4–5 pens)	
12 May 2018	2018 FAI Intermediate Cup Final	(Republic of Ireland) Maynooth University Town	(Republic of Ireland) Firhouse Clover	4–1 (aet)	
2 June 2018	Friendly	Republic of Ireland	United States	2–1	32,300
1 August 2018	Friendly	(England) Arsenal	(England) Chelsea	1–1 (6–5 pens)	46,002
4 August 2018	Friendly	(England) Liverpool	(Italy) Napoli	5–0	51,512
13 October 2018	2018–19 UEFA Nations League	Republic of Ireland	Denmark	0–0	41,220
16 October 2018	2018–19 UEFA Nations League	Republic of Ireland	Wales	0–1	38,321
4 November 2018	2018 FAI Women's Cup Final	(Republic of Ireland) Wexford Youths	(Republic of Ireland) Peamount United	1–0	
4 November 2018	2018 FAI Cup Final	(Republic of Ireland) Cork City	(Republic of Ireland) Dundalk	1–2	30,412
15 November 2018	Friendly	Republic of Ireland	Northern Ireland	0–0	31,241
26 March 2019	UEFA Euro 2020 qualifying	Republic of Ireland	Georgia	1–0	40,317
11 May 2019	2019 FAI Intermediate Cup Final	(Republic of Ireland) Avondale United	(Republic of Ireland) Crumlin United	1–0	
10 June 2019	UEFA Euro 2020 qualifying	Republic of Ireland	Gibraltar	2–0	36,281
5 September 2019	UEFA Euro 2020 qualifying	Republic of Ireland	Switzerland	1–1	44,111
10 September 2019	Friendly	Republic of Ireland	Bulgaria	3–1	18,259
3 November 2019	2019 FAI Women's Cup Final	(Republic of Ireland) Wexford Youths	(Republic of Ireland) Peamount United	3–2	2,500
3 November 2019	2019 FAI Cup Final	(Republic of Ireland) Shamrock Rovers	(Republic of Ireland) Dundalk	1–1 (aet) (4–2 pens)	33,111
14 November 2019	Friendly	Republic of Ireland	New Zealand	3–1	18,728
18 November 2019	UEFA Euro 2020 qualifying	Republic of Ireland	Denmark	1–1	51,700
6 September 2020	2020–21 UEFA Nations League	Republic of Ireland	Finland	0–1	0*
11 October 2020	2020–21 UEFA Nations League	Republic of Ireland	Wales	0–0	0*
18 November 2020	2020–21 UEFA Nations League	Republic of Ireland	Bulgaria	0–0	0*
26 November 2020	UEFA Europa League	(Republic of Ireland) Dundalk	(Austria) Rapid Wien	1–3	0*
6 December 2020	2020 FAI Cup Final	(Republic of Ireland) Shamrock Rovers	(Republic of Ireland) Dundalk	2–4 (aet)	0*
10 December 2020	UEFA Europa League	(Republic of Ireland) Dundalk	(England) Arsenal	2–4	0*
27 March 2021	2022 World Cup qualification	Republic of Ireland	Luxembourg	0–1	0*
15 July 2021	UEFA Europa Conference League qualification	(Republic of Ireland) Bohemians	(Iceland) Stjarnan	3–0	6,000*
29 July 2021	UEFA Europa Conference League qualification	(Republic of Ireland) Bohemians	(Luxembourg) F91 Dudelange	3–0	8,000*
3 August 2021	UEFA Europa Conference League qualification	(Republic of Ireland) Bohemians	(Greece) PAOK	2–1	8,000*
4 September 2021	2022 World Cup qualification	Republic of Ireland	Azerbaijan	1–1	21,287*
7 September 2021	2022 World Cup qualification	Republic of Ireland	Serbia	1–1	25,415*
12 October 2021	Friendly	Republic of Ireland	Qatar	4–0	25,749*
11 November 2021	2022 World Cup qualification	Republic of Ireland	Portugal	0–0	50,737
28 November 2021	2021 FAI Cup Final	(Republic of Ireland) St Patrick's Athletic	(Republic of Ireland) Bohemians	1–1 (aet) (4–3 pens)	37,126
26 March 2022	Friendly	Republic of Ireland	Belgium	2–2	48,808
29 March 2022	Friendly	Republic of Ireland	Lithuania	1–0	30,686
8 June 2022	UEFA Nations League	Republic of Ireland	Ukraine	0–1	40,111
11 June 2022	UEFA Nations League	Republic of Ireland	Scotland	3–0	46,947
27 September 2022	UEFA Nations League	Republic of Ireland	Armenia	3–2	41,718
13 November 2022	2022 FAI Cup Final	(Republic of Ireland) Derry City	(Republic of Ireland) Shelbourne	4–0	32,412
17 November 2022	Friendly	Republic of Ireland	Norway	1–2	41,140
22 March 2023	Friendly	Republic of Ireland	Latvia	3–2	41,211
27 March 2023	UEFA Euro Qualifying	Republic of Ireland	France	0–1	50,219
29 July 2023	Friendly	(Scotland) Celtic	(England) Wolverhampton Wanderers	1–1	28,244
6 August 2023	Friendly	(England) Manchester United	(Spain) Athletic Bilbao	1–1	50,238
10 September 2023	UEFA Euro Qualifying	Republic of Ireland	Netherlands	1–2	49,807
13 October 2023	UEFA Euro Qualifying	Republic of Ireland	Greece	0–2	41,239
12 November 2023	2023 FAI Cup Final	(Republic of Ireland) Bohemians	(Republic of Ireland) St Patrick's Athletic	1–3	43,881
21 November 2023	Friendly	Republic of Ireland	New Zealand	1–1	26,517
23 March 2024	Friendly	Republic of Ireland	Belgium	0–0	38,128
26 March 2024	Friendly	Republic of Ireland	Switzerland	0–1	35,742
22 May 2024	2024 UEFA Europa League Final	(Italy) Atalanta	(Germany) Bayer 04 Leverkusen	3–0	47,135
4 June 2024	Friendly	Republic of Ireland	Hungary	2–1	29,424
7 September 2024	UEFA Nations League	Republic of Ireland	England	0–2	50,359
10 September 2024	UEFA Nations League	Republic of Ireland	Greece	0–2	37,274
10 November 2024	2024 FAI Cup final	(Republic of Ireland) Drogheda United	(Republic of Ireland) Derry City	2–0	38,723
14 November 2024	UEFA Nations League	Republic of Ireland	Finland	1–0	39,163
16 February 2025	2025 League of Ireland Premier Division	(Republic of Ireland) Bohemians	(Republic of Ireland) Shamrock Rovers	1–0	33,208
23 March 2025	UEFA Nations League relegation playoff	Republic of Ireland	Bulgaria	2–1	40,156
6 June 2025	Friendly	Republic of Ireland	Senegal	1–1	32,478
6 September 2025	2026 FIFA World Cup qualification	Republic of Ireland	Hungary	2–2	51,137
14 October 2025	2026 FIFA World Cup qualification	Republic of Ireland	Armenia	1–0	42,292
9 November 2025	2025 FAI Cup final	(Republic of Ireland) Shamrock Rovers	(Republic of Ireland) Cork City	2–0	35,252
13 November 2025	2026 FIFA World Cup qualification	Republic of Ireland	Portugal	2–0	50,717
8 February 2026	2026 League of Ireland Premier Division	(Republic of Ireland) Bohemians	(Republic of Ireland) St Patrick's Athletic	0–0	21,472
31 March 2026	Friendly	Republic of Ireland	North Macedonia	0–0	39,560
28 May 2026	Friendly	Republic of Ireland	Qatar	1–0	28,941
5 August 2026	Friendly	(England) Arsenal	(Spain) Real Betis	1–3	51,000
1 October 2026	UEFA Nations League	Republic of Ireland	Austria	2–2	45,782
8 November 2026	2026 FAI Cup final	(Republic of Ireland) Derry City	(Republic of Ireland) Waterford United	1–0	36,093
17 November 2026	UEFA Nations League	Republic of Ireland	Kosovo	3–0	50,381
10 June 2028	UEFA Euro 2028 Group B	B3	B4	–	
12 June 2028	UEFA Euro 2028 Group E	E1	E2	–	
16 June 2028	UEFA Euro 2028 Group E	E1	E3	–	
19 June 2028	UEFA Euro 2028 Group B	B2	B3	–	
21 June 2028	UEFA Euro 2028 Group E	E4	E1	–	
27 June 2028	UEFA Euro 2028 Round of 16	Winner Group E	3rd Group A/B/C/D	–	
30 June 2028	UEFA Euro 2028 Quarter-finals	Winner Match 41	Winner Match 42	–	
^{*}Denotes match in which COVID-19 restrictions limited attendance

The stadium also hosts the home games of the Republic of Ireland national football team, as did Lansdowne Road. The team had played most home games at Croke Park during the construction of the Aviva Stadium. The first football match in the Aviva Stadium was Manchester United against a League of Ireland XI side, managed by Damien Richardson, on 4 August 2010. Manchester United won the game 7–1, with Park Ji-Sung scoring the first ever goal in the Aviva Stadium. The first international game for Ireland in the Aviva Stadium was a 1–0 friendly loss against Argentina on 11 August 2010. The first competitive goal was scored by Kevin Kilbane in a Euro 2012 qualifying game on 7 September 2010 against Andorra.

Ireland's record at the Aviva
Competition	Played	Won	Drawn	Lost	% Won	% Lost
Euros qualifiers	18	8	6	4	44.44%	22.22%
World Cup qualifiers	18	6	7	5	33.33%	33.33%
Nations Cup	3	3	0	0	100%	0%
Nations League	13	4	4	5	30.77%	38.46%
Friendlies	37	16	12	9	43.24%	24.32%
Total	89	37	29	23	41.57%	25.84%

Updated as of 17 November 2026.

=== FAI Cup Final ===
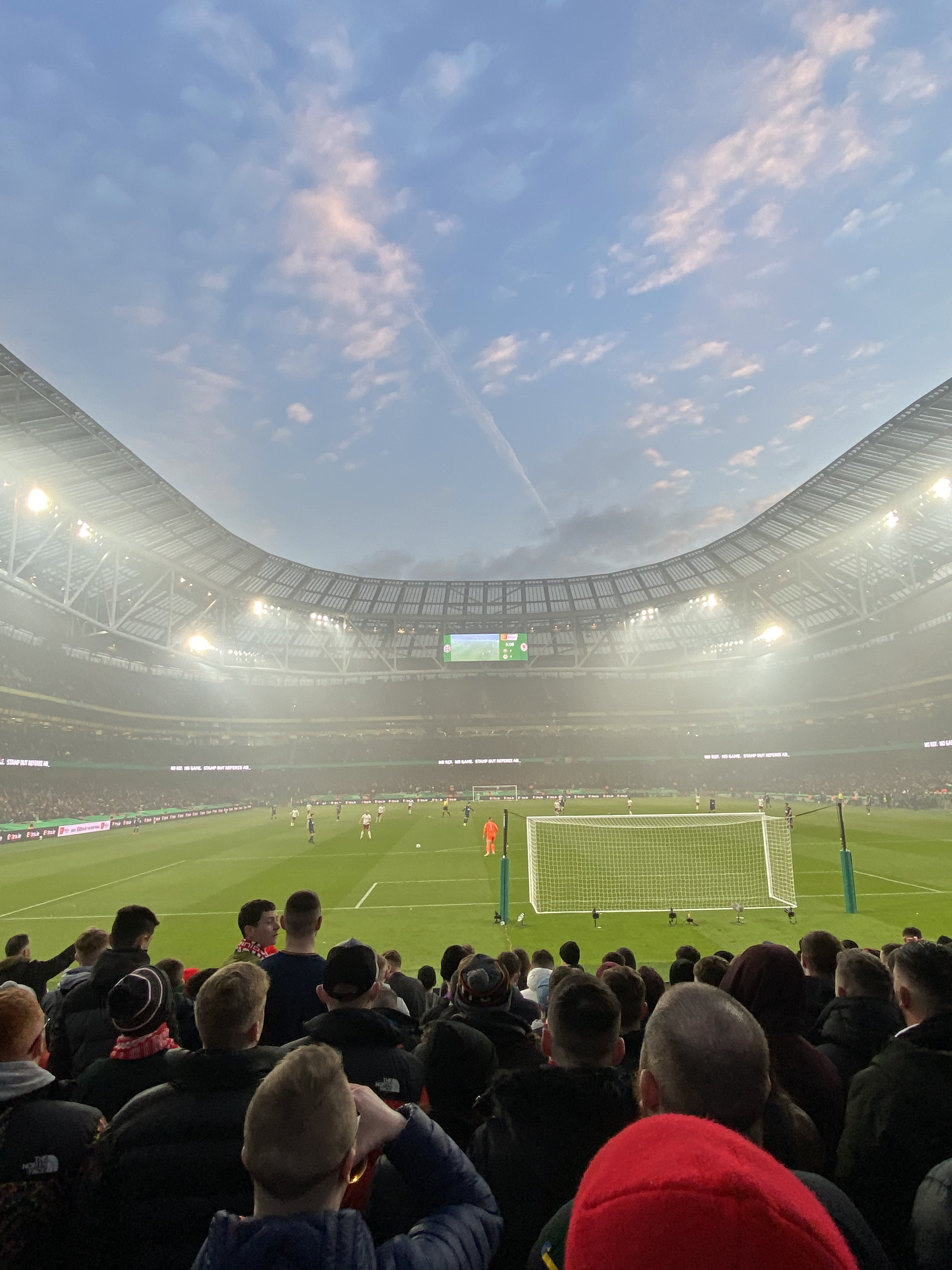
St Patrick's Athletic vs Bohemians in the 2021 FAI Cup Final.

The Aviva has annually hosted the FAI Cup Final since 2010. While the Aviva Stadium was under construction the cup final hosting was shared between the RDS Arena and Tallaght Stadium. The first Cup Final at the new stadium was the 2010 FAI Cup Final, held on Sunday 14 November 2010. Sligo Rovers beat Shamrock Rovers 2–0 on penalties after the game finished 0–0 after extra time. A total of 36,101 attended the game making it the biggest attendance at an FAI Cup Final since 1968. A total of 37,126 spectators were in attendance for the 2021 Final in which St Patrick's Athletic defeated Bohemians on penalties. The Aviva hosted 43,881 for the 2023 Final between the same two sides, a record breaking attendance for an FAI Cup final.

=== League of Ireland ===
In February 2025 the Aviva hosted the largest ever attendance at a League of Ireland Premier Division game, with 33,208 for Bohemians' 1–0 win over Shamrock Rovers.

=== 2011 Nations Cup ===
The 2011 Nations Cup took place in the Aviva Stadium. The tournament featured national football teams from Scotland, Wales, Northern Ireland and the Republic of Ireland. In the opening round of fixtures, the Republic of Ireland beat Wales 3–0 while Scotland beat Northern Ireland 3–0. The remaining four fixtures took place in May, with the Republic of Ireland winning the tournament after beating Scotland 1–0 on 29 May, with Keane scoring the only goal.

=== 2011 Europa League final ===
The 2011 UEFA Europa League final between Portuguese sides Porto and Braga took place in the Aviva Stadium. Due to UEFA rules against corporate sponsorship outside the federation, the stadium was referred to as the "Dublin Arena" for this final, that ended with a 1–0 victory for Porto courtesy of a Radamel Falcao goal. Porto thus won the treble of Primeira Liga, Taça de Portugal, and Europa League.

=== Dublin Super Cup ===
The Dublin Super Cup was a pre-season football tournament which was held at the Aviva. Celtic, Manchester City, Inter Milan and a League of Ireland XI competed in the 2011 edition, with Manchester City winning the tournament.

=== The 'Dublin Decider' ===
The 'Dublin Decider' was a game which took place on 10 August 2013. The match was played between Celtic and Liverpool, with both teams having large support in Ireland. Celtic won the match 1–0 thanks to a goal from Amido Balde.

There were talks ongoing about a return of the 'Dublin Decider' in the summer of 2014 with clubs such as Barcelona, Manchester United and Celtic being mentioned as potential visitors to the Aviva Stadium. It was confirmed in March 2016 that Celtic would face Barcelona in the stadium on 30 July 2016, however, this was as part of the annual International Champions Cup pre-season tournament, and not any sort of independent 'Dublin Decider' fixture. Barcelona won the game 3–1.

=== Abandoned UEFA Euro 2020 hosting ===
On 19 September 2014, UEFA announced that the stadium would host four fixtures in the Euro 2020 finals tournament, three of which would be group games and, the fourth, a round of 16 matches. Had Ireland qualified they would have been guaranteed two home group games. As Aviva was not a commercial partner of the Euro 2020 tournament, the stadium would have been referred to as the Dublin Arena throughout. However, the COVID-19 pandemic intervened and UEFA postponed the tournament until 2021 (though UEFA retained the tournament's original name). Restrictions still in force after the pandemic's Third Wave struck the Republic of Ireland, killing thousands in the early part of 2021, meant that Dublin and the Aviva Stadium were unable to fulfil their hosting duties to UEFA's satisfaction and, therefore, the stadium lost its Euro 2020 host rights. The announcement, which came on 23 April 2021, allocated Dublin's three group games to the Krestovsky Stadium in Saint Petersburg, Russia, and Dublin's originally scheduled last 16 (group D winner vs group F runner up) tie to Wembley Stadium in London, England.

On 16 July 2021, the UEFA Executive Committee announced that due to the withdrawal of hosting rights for Euro 2020, the Aviva Stadium was given hosting rights for the 2024 UEFA Europa League Final. This was part of a settlement agreement by UEFA to recognise the efforts and financial investment made to host UEFA Euro 2020. The stadium would later get hosting rights for UEFA Euro 2028.

=== 2024 Europa League final ===
Thirteen years after the 2011 final, Aviva Stadium hosted the 2024 Europa League final between Italian side Atalanta and German side Bayer Leverkusen. Due to UEFA rules against corporate sponsorship outside the federation, the stadium was referred to as the "Dublin Arena" for the final. Leverkusen, who was seeking to emulate what Porto did in 2011 having won the Bundesliga and due to play in the DFB-Pokal final, was soundly beaten by Atalanta 3–0, winning the latter's first ever European trophy and breaking Leverkusen's unbeaten streak.

=== UEFA Euro 2028 ===
In October 2023, UEFA announced the venues for the UEFA Euro 2028. The Aviva Stadium, alongside venues in the United Kingdom, will host several matches in the tournament.

== Other events ==
=== American football ===
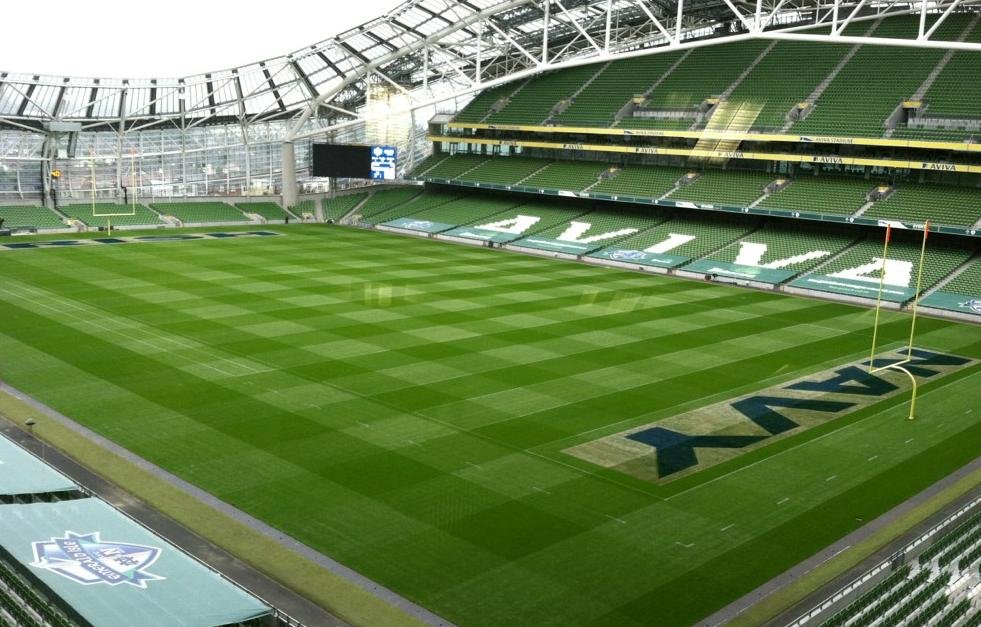
The stadium in American football configuration for Navy vs. Notre Dame in 2012

On 1 September 2012, the stadium hosted an American college football game billed as the Emerald Isle Classic between the Notre Dame Fighting Irish and the Navy Midshipmen. Notre Dame won 50–10.

The 2016 Aer Lingus College Football Classic was announced as a matchup between the Georgia Tech Yellow Jackets and the Boston College Eagles to be played on 3 September 2016. The result was a 17–14 win by the Yellow Jackets.

The Nebraska Cornhuskers and the Northwestern Wildcats kicked off their 2022 seasons at the Aviva Stadium with Northwestern winning 31–28. It was soon confirmed that Notre Dame would once again play Navy in the Aer Lingus College Football Classic at the Aviva Stadium on 26 August 2023. Notre Dame ran out winners with the final score 42–3.

American Football Games
Date	Competition	Home	Score	Away	Attendance
1 September 2012	Emerald Isle Classic	Notre Dame	50–10	Navy	48,820
3 September 2016	Aer Lingus College Football Classic	Georgia Tech	17–14	Boston College	40,562
27 August 2022	Aer Lingus College Football Classic	Northwestern	31–28	Nebraska	42,699
26 August 2023	Aer Lingus College Football Classic	Notre Dame	42–3	Navy	49,000
24 August 2024	Aer Lingus College Football Classic	Georgia Tech	24–21	Florida State	47,998
23 August 2025	Aer Lingus College Football Classic	Iowa State	24–21	Kansas State	47,221
29 August 2026	Aer Lingus College Football Classic	North Carolina	15–10	Texas Christian	40,457

=== Concerts ===
Concerts at the Aviva Stadium
Date	Artist	Tour	Attendance
24–25 September 2010	Michael Bublé	Crazy Love Tour	95,895
25 June 2011	Neil Diamond	World Tour 2011	50,108
2 July 2011	The Script	Science & Faith Tour	47,910
24 July 2012	Madonna	The MDNA Tour	33,953
15 September 2012	Lady Gaga	The Born This Way Ball	37,005
14 June 2013	Robbie Williams	Take the Crown Stadium Tour	50,000
21 June 2013	Rihanna	Diamonds World Tour	48,482
18 September 2013	Roger Waters	The Wall Live	24,210
1 July 2015	AC/DC	Rock or Bust World Tour	52,000
21 June 2016	Rihanna	Anti World Tour	29,017
17 June 2017	Robbie Williams	The Heavy Entertainment Show Tour	50,000
25 June 2017	Phil Collins	Not Dead Yet Tour	37,609
23 June 2018	Billy Joel	Billy Joel in Concert	40,590
22 June 2022	Harry Styles	Love On Tour	50,422
24 June 2022	Eagles	Hotel California 2020 Tour	40,000
8–9 July 2022	Westlife	The Wild Dreams Tour	87,367
20–21 June 2024	Pink	Pink Summer Carnival	130,000
28–30 June 2024	Taylor Swift	The Eras Tour	150,000
27 June 2025	Dua Lipa	Radical Optimism Tour	65,000
30 June 2025	Lana Del Rey	2023–2025 tour	50,000
19–21 June 2026	Metallica	M72 World Tour	
4 July 2026	Take That	The Circus Live – Summer 2026	
11–12 July 2026	Dermot Kennedy		

== Facilities ==
The stadium is a bowl shape with four tiers on three sides of the ground; the lower and upper tiers are for general access, the second and third levels feed the second tier for premium tickets and the third tier for corporate boxes. The northern end of the stadium, due to its proximity to local housing, incorporates only the lower tier of the bowl. This end of the stadium is to be the away stand for football internationals. There is one basement level and seven storeys of floors including ground level. The premium level holds 10,000 spectators, while the box level holds 1,300. The remaining 38,700 seats are shared between the top and bottom tiers. The capacity of the stadium was criticised even before its opening for being too small, particularly in light of the large supporter attendance figures for Irish rugby internationals and football internationals at Croke Park since 2007. The stadium's roof undulates in a wave-like manner so as to avoid blocking light to local residences.

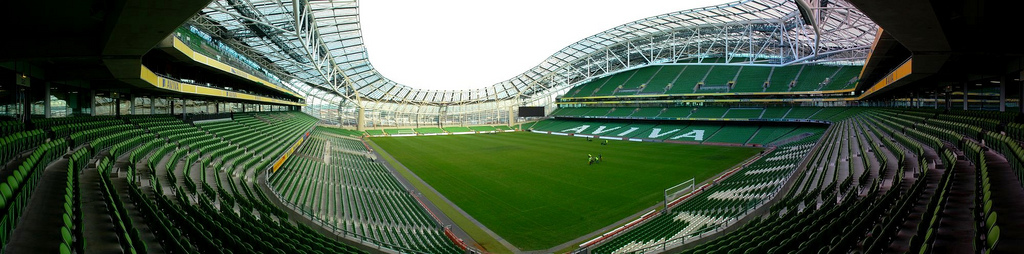
Aviva Stadium Panoramic view

== Transport connections ==
The stadium is served by public transport with Bus and DART. More remotely, it may also be reached by Luas and on foot. The stadium is inaccessible by car on match days due to a 1 km car-free exclusion zone in operation.

Service	Location	Route
Dublin Bus	Pembroke Road	Bus routes 4, 7, 7a, S2 – 600-metre walk to stadium entrance
Dublin Bus	Ringsend Road	Bus routes 47, 52, 56a, 77a, 82, C1, C2, C3, C4 – 1.2 km walk to stadium entrance
Luas – Green Line	Charlemont	2.2 km walk
Luas – Red Line	Point Village	2.1 km walk
Iarnród Éireann – DART	Lansdowne Road	Direct to stadium

== See also ==
- List of association football venues in the Republic of Ireland
- List of stadiums in Ireland by capacity
- List of rugby union stadiums by capacity
- Lists of stadiums

Preceded by HSH Nordbank Arena; Hamburg	UEFA Europa League; Final venue 2011	Succeeded by Arena Națională; Bucharest
Preceded by Puskás Aréna; Budapest	UEFA Europa League; Final venue 2024	Succeeded by San Mamés; Bilbao
