= Paddy Gavin =

Irish footballer

Personal information
- Full name: Patrick Joseph Gavin
- Date of birth: 6 June 1929
- Place of birth: Drogheda, Ireland
- Date of death: 8 April 2006 (aged 76)
- Place of death: Doncaster, England
- Position: Left back

Youth career
- 1943–1948: Naomh Mhuire
- 1948–1949: Wolfe Tones
- 1948–1949: Louth GAA Minors

Senior career*
Years	Team	Apps	(Gls)
1948–1949	Louth GAA	1	(1)
1949–1953	Dundalk	54	(3)
1953–1960	Doncaster Rovers	147	(5)
1960–	Doncaster United		

International career
1957	Republic of Ireland B	1	(0)
- * Club domestic league appearances and goals

Patrick Joseph Gavin (6 June 1929 – 8 April 2006) was a footballer who played for Dundalk and Doncaster Rovers, mainly as a left back. He also appeared in two international matches, for The League of Ireland, and for Ireland B.

== Club career ==
=== Dundalk ===
Coming from a family engaged with Gaelic football, as a junior Gavin initially played for Naomh Mhuire, and then for a 1947 cup winning Wolfe Tones team, and in the same year for Louth GAA Minors and soon for the senior side. After his first senior game in the National League he was signed up by Dundalk and into the world of football. Initially he played in the reserves, making his full debut against Transport on 9 April 1949.

=== Doncaster Rovers ===
Peter Doherty signed him for second division club Doncaster Rovers in October 1949. There was a large Irish contingent at the club at that time including Harry Gregg who he shared digs with, and whom became a long-term friend.

It wasn't until 15 February 1954 that Gavin broke into the first 11 following an injury to Len Graham, making his debut in a 0–1 home defeat by Bury. He played six more league games that season, and seventeen the following season often as a replacement for Graham at left back, but also filling in at half back.

In 1955–56, he was again second in line behind Graham, only playing twelve games, however he did score his only Doncaster goal in that season. It was during a home game against Lincoln City on 27 December, the day after playing them away at Sincil Bank, and Rovers were winning 1–0 when a penalty was awarded. The regular penalty taker, Bobby Herbert, wasn't playing so Gavin took it and scored in front of the 18,323 Belle Vue crowd.

The following season he played 38 League games, filling in for the injured Morgan Hunt at right half, and then similarly in the left half position, scoring four times, three of those from the penalty spot. In 1957–58 he played mainly at left half in 35 League matches scoring no goals, not helped by Tommy Cavanagh having the penalty taker role, and it being a poor season for Doncaster who ended up at the bottom of the league, and relegated. The next season, in the newly formed Division Three, Rovers ended up third to the bottom and relegated again. He played 38 League games that season.

Gavin's final season at Doncaster was in Division Four. He only played 9 times, his last appearance being a 0–2 home defeat against Rochdale on 6 February 1960 in front of 3,740 fans. Before retiring to amateur football at the end of the season, he had made 156 League and FA Cup appearances for the club, scoring 5 goals.

On leaving Rovers, he continued playing football as an amateur for Doncaster United until an ankle injury ended his playing career.

== International career ==
In 1953, Gavin was in a League of Ireland team, marking Tom Finney, that lost 0–2 against an English Football League side in front of 40,000 at Dalymount Park, Dublin. Gavin appeared in the very first Irish B team in an international friendly against Romania B on 20 October 1957, which was drawn 1–1.

== Personal life ==
Despite having completed his coaching course at Lillisall in 1956, Gavin did not pursue coaching after his playing career ended.

In 1958 he married Maureen Massarella, niece of Ronnie Massarella OBE, ice cream magnate and manager of the British Show Jumping Team. On retiring from playing professional football, Gavin was invited to manage Yeovil Town but instead he opted to work in his father in law's business, managing a depot in Chesterfield. Later, he managed and developed a couple of grocery stores in Doncaster until his retirement at the age of 68.
