= Jackie Clarke (footballer) =

Irish footballer

Jackie Clarke (born 1949) was an Irish soccer player during the 1960s and 1970s.

== Career ==
An amateur and youth international, Jackie was a defender who played for Shamrock Rovers and Bohemians amongst others during his career in the League of Ireland. Clarke came from a proud sporting family; his father Mattie Clarke won the FAI Cup 4 times with Rovers. Jackie matched him in 1970 when he was part of Bohemians' FAI Cup winning team.

He made his Rovers debut on 20 April 1966 Signed for Celtic in July 1968 Returned to Bohs in November 1969.

== Sources ==
- Paul Doolan; Robert Goggins. The Hoops. ISBN 0-7171-2121-6.
