= Joe Martin (Irish footballer) =

Irish footballer (1931–2023)

Personal information
- Date of birth: 30 May 1931
- Place of birth: Dundalk, Ireland
- Date of death: 17 January 2023 (aged 91)
- Place of death: Dundalk, Ireland
- Position: Centre forward

Senior career*
Years	Team	Apps	(Gls)
1949–1960	Dundalk	212	(109)
1956–1957	→ Portadown		
1957	→ Bangor		
1957–1958	→ Tandragee Rovers		

International career
1951	League of Ireland XI	1	(0)
- * Club domestic league appearances and goals

Joseph Martin (30 May 1931 – 17 January 2023) was an Irish football player who played for Dundalk in the League of Ireland.

== Career ==
Martin was a noted goal-scorer from his days in the local Minor and Junior Leagues, once scoring a nine goals in one game. A planned two-month trial with Derby County in 1949 was cut short when Dundalk claimed he was registered with the club. Martin was a member of the 'C' team that was successful in the Leinster Junior Shield in the 1949–50 season. His senior debut came in a 3–2 City Cup victory over Bohemians on 11 September 1949.

Martin's performances earned his selection for the League of Ireland XI that played the West German League in 1951. An injury restricted his early appearances in the 1951–52 season, however, he ended the season with an FAI Cup winners' medal after a win over Cork Athletic in a replay.

The next four seasons brought no more club success. At the end of the 1955–56 season, he became only the third Dundalk player to score 100 goals. After being released by Dundalk at the end of the 1955–56 season, he joined Portadown. An unsuccessful two months with Bangor was followed by a spell with Tandragee Rovers before returning to Dundalk for two more years after which he retired at the age of 29.

== Post-playing career ==
After retiring from football, Martin worked at Halliday's shoe factory in Dundalk. He was also a well-known figure on the local entertainment scene as a singer, storyteller and raconteur. His accolades in this field include numerous talent show victories, People of the Year awards and several Hall of Fame awards. Martin also appeared on RTÉ's Live at 3 and hosted his own radio show on Dundalk FM.

== Death ==
Martin died on 17 January 2023, at the age of 91.

== Honours ==
Dundalk

- FAI Cup: 1951–52
