= Mattie Clarke =

Irish footballer

Mattie Clarke (23 November 1919 – 6 January 1960) was an Irish footballer.

== Early life ==
Born Matthew Alphonsus Clarke in Dublin in 1919 to John Clarke, a constable in the Dublin Metropolitan Police, and Mary Cullen, he grew up in 12 Thirlestane Terrace, Thomas Court. In 1944, he married Ellen Kinsella, giving his profession as professional footballer.

== Career ==
Clarke was a product of Drumcondra. He played for his country at youth level against England in 1938. Shortly after he joined Shamrock Rovers where he spent 12 seasons as a defender. However, he joined Rovers as a striker and scored a hat-trick in one of his first games for the club. He went on to appear in five FAI Cup with Rovers, winning four of them. He played nine times for the League of Ireland XI while at Glenmalure Park.

He won his one and only senior cap for Ireland on 10 May 1950 in a 5–1 defeat to Belgium in Brussels.

In the 1950–51 season Clarke was awarded a testimonial for his twelve years service at Milltown. He then moved to Dundalk, where he won another FAI Cup medal. He signed for Waterford United in August 1954.

== Death and family ==
By 1960, Clarke was working as a commercial traveller and football coach, having previously worked for the Guinness Brewery. On 6 January 1960, Clarke was killed when the car he was driving crashed into a gate pier near county council roadworks. He was survived by his wife Ellen and his four children.

Following his death, a testimonial match in his memory was held in Tolka Park in November 1960.

His son Jackie also played football, including for Shamrock Rovers and Celtic F.C..

== Sources ==
- Paul Doolan; Robert Goggins. The Hoops. ISBN 0-7171-2121-6.
