= Mick Neville (footballer) =

Irish footballer (born 1960)

Personal information
- Date of birth: 25 November 1960 (age 65)
- Place of birth: Dublin, Ireland
- Position: Defender

Senior career*
Years	Team	Apps	(Gls)
1979–1982	Home Farm	85	(7)
1982–1983	Drogheda United	26	(3)
1983–1988	Shamrock Rovers	116	(16)
1988–1990	Derry City	66	(4)
1990–1998	Shelbourne	247	(8)
Total		540	(38)

International career
- League of Ireland XI
- * Club domestic league appearances and goals

Michael Neville (born 25 November 1960) is an Irish former footballer who played for Home Farm, Drogheda United, Shamrock Rovers, Derry City, and Shelbourne.

Neville started off with Home Farm where in three seasons he made 85 league appearances. He joined Drogheda United at the start of the 1982–83 season where he made 26 league appearances in his one season there.

Neville then moved to Milltown where he won four League of Ireland titles and three FAI Cups making 116 league appearances in five seasons. In total he made 179 appearances, including 6 appearances in European competition, scoring 20 goals. During this time he also for the League of Ireland XI in 6 qualifiers and two further Inter League games.

He then joined Derry City in 1988 and in his first season he won the domestic treble. He went on to make 66 league appearances in his two seasons there.

Neville signed for Shelbourne in 1990 and captained them to the league title in April 1992. The following year he captained Shels as they won the FAI Cup, at Lansdowne Road, for the first time in thirty years. Neville captained Shels to back-to-back FAI Cup wins in 1996 and 1997 as well as the League of Ireland Cup in 1995–96. He played 247 league games for Shels.

Neville was Director of Coaching at Shelbourne for eight years. While he with Shelbourne he helped relaunch Shelbourne Ladies F.C. in 2007. In June 2007 he was appointed as the FAI's Regional Development officer for County Louth.

== Honours ==
League of Ireland: 6

- Shamrock Rovers – 1983–84, 1984–85, 1985–86, 1986–87
- Derry City – 1988–89
- Shelbourne – 1991–92

FAI Cup: 7

- Shamrock Rovers – 1985, 1986, 1987
- Derry City – 1989
- Shelbourne – 1993, 1996, 1997

League of Ireland Cup: 2

- Derry City – 1988–89
- Shelbourne – 1995–96
- LFA President's Cup: 2
- Shamrock Rovers – 1984–85, 1987–88
- Dublin City Cup
- Shamrock Rovers – 1983–84
- SRFC Player of the Year:
- Shamrock Rovers – 1985–86

== Sources ==
- Paul Doolan; Robert Goggins. The Hoops. ISBN 0-7171-2121-6.
