= Tommy Traynor (Irish footballer) =

Irish footballer

Personal information
- Full name: Thomas Joseph Traynor
- Date of birth: 22 July 1933
- Place of birth: Dundalk, Ireland
- Date of death: 20 September 2006 (aged 73)
- Place of death: Southampton, England
- Position: Left back

Senior career*
Years	Team	Apps	(Gls)
1950–1952	Dundalk	10	(0)
1952–1966	Southampton	434	(7)

International career
1954–1964	Republic of Ireland	8	(0)
- * Club domestic league appearances and goals

Thomas Joseph Traynor (22 July 1933 – 20 September 2006) was an Irish footballer who played his entire English professional career for Southampton between 1952 and 1966.

During his 14 years at The Dell he became virtually an institution, and by the end of his career he held the record for appearances for Southampton.

== Playing career ==
=== Dundalk ===
Traynor was born in Dundalk and originally was the product of local club St Patricks. He had just turned 17 years of age when he was promoted, on 10 September 1950, from the club's reserve and youth squad for a Dublin City Cup trip to Limerick's Market's Field. Keeping his place for the next two games which were away from home he made his Oriel Park debut on 31 December 1950 in a League of Ireland as a substitute in a game against Sligo Rovers.

He was a member of a high quality Dundalk youth squad that had progressed to the semi-finals of both the FAI and Leinster Minor Cups and included some International and Inter-League players. For the next season, his place was with the reserves until injuries saw him line out in a League game against Sligo in early February, on the weekend before the first round 1952 FAI Cup clash versus St Patrick's Athletic. This time there was no going back to the reserves. A superb Cup game secured his place for the remainder of the season, thanks to a merciless sliding tackle and a deceptive turn of speed. A tough tackling, uncompromising defender, by the season's end he had in his possession a coveted FAI Cup medal, after Dundalk defeated Cork Athletic in a final replay, an Amateur international Cap against Scotland.

=== Southampton ===
He turned down offers from Chelsea and Manchester City to join Southampton in June 1952; he made his debut on 11 October 1952 away to Brentford making 10 appearances as Saints went on to be relegated from Division 2 at the end of that season.

The following season, in Division 3, he became the club's regular left-back and his sliding tackles and deceptive turn of pace stood him in good stead as Saints began the long haul back to Division 2. Although he was not the most athletic player, he had good positional sense and a strong left foot..

Tommy won eight Republic of Ireland national football team caps between 1954 and 1964 making his debut against Luxembourg in 1954 .

By the time of Southampton's promotion season in 1966, age was catching up with him and he only made one appearance in his final season, at home to Preston on 27 November 1965.

In his later years, he became an influential figure at the club, and he was granted a prestigious testimonial against FC Twente.

During his time at The Dell he amassed 487 appearances for the club, scoring eight goals.

== After football ==
Traynor was a founding member of the Southampton Tyro League in the late 1960s. After retiring at the end of the 1965–66 season, he briefly ran an off-licence and worked in Southampton Docks.

He died in September 2006 at the age of 73 after a short illness.

== Honours ==
Dundalk

- FAI Cup winners: 1952

Southampton

- Football League Division 3 champions: 1959–60
