= Jackie Lennox =

English footballer and fryer (1920–1994)

John Lennox
Personal information
- Date of birth: 15 October 1920
- Place of birth: Crumpsall, Manchester
- Date of death: December 1994
- Place of death: Belgooly, County Cork
- Position: Winger

Senior career*
Years	Team	Apps	(Gls)
- Blackpool
- Cliftonville
- Crosshaven AFC
- Cork Athletic
- * Club domestic league appearances and goals

John "Jackie" Lennox was an English footballer and fryer, best known for being the founder of the famous Jackie Lennoxs chipper in Cork City, the first fish and chip shop in the city and the first purpose built fish and chip shop in the country which lasted 73 years in business.

== Career ==
As a teenager Lennox started off his career as a boxer with the local Sunnyside Boxing Club in Cork. He won the county and provincial championships in 1939-40. He lost in the national final to Peter Gernon who went on to defeat the USA Golden Gloves champion at the time. He later became a juvenile coach with Irish champion Tommy Hyde being a notable pupil. He left Cork for a few years to play football for both Blackpool and Cliftonville. He returned to Cork in the 1940s and had great success with Cork Athletic winning the double in 1951 and league cup again in 1953. In the 1953 FAI Cup final Lennox along with former England international Raich Carter scored the goals to give them a 2–1 victory over Cork Celtic known as Evergeen United at the time. In 1951 the same year he married his wife Eileen, he opened the famous Jackie Lennox chipper. Prior to opening the famous chipper Lennox was the owner of a bookies in Blackpool with a confectionary shop operating on the floor above.

== Later life ==
Lennox died in 1994 shortly after his retirement. His wife Eileen died two years later.His business was taken over by his family, primarily son Brian Lennox. In October 2024 it was announced that the chipper would close that month after 73 years in business due to struggles to find staff. It was described as a death in the family.

== Honours ==
Cork Athletic

- League of Ireland: 1950-1951
- FAI Cup: 1950-1951, 1952-1953
