= Danny Murphy (footballer, born 1982) =

English-born Irish footballer

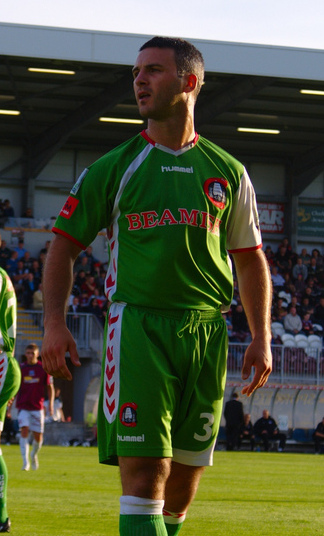
- Playing for Cork City in 2009

Personal information
- Full name: Daniel Thomas Murphy
- Date of birth: 4 December 1982 (age 43)
- Place of birth: Bermondsey, England
- Position: Left back

Team information
- Current team: Cork City WFC (manager)

Youth career
- 1994–1997: West Ham United
- 1997–2000: Queens Park Rangers

Senior career*
Years	Team	Apps	(Gls)
2000–2003	Queens Park Rangers	23	(0)
2003	Swindon Town	0	(0)
2003–2004	Margate	12	(0)
2004–2006	Cork City	83	(1)
2007–2008	Motherwell	15	(1)
2007–2008	→ Dunfermline Athletic (loan)	12	(0)
2008–2009	Cork City	60	(2)
2010	Shamrock Rovers	26	(0)
2011–2014	Cork City	87	(2)
2016–2017	Leatherhead		

International career
1999	Republic of Ireland U17	1	(0)
2011	League of Ireland XI	2	(0)
- * Club domestic league appearances and goals

Daniel Thomas Murphy (born 4 December 1982) is an English-born Irish football coach and former left back. Currently the manager of Women's National League club Cork City WFC, Murphy has previously played for Queens Park Rangers, Swindon Town, Margate, Cork City, Motherwell, Shamrock Rovers and Leatherhead, as well as Dunfermline Athletic on loan during his time at these clubs.

== Playing career ==
=== In England ===
Murphy, a left full back, previously played for Queens Park Rangers, Swindon Town, and Margate.

=== Queens Park Rangers ===
Murphy started his youth career at West Ham United before moving across London to sign YTS forms with Queens Park Rangers. After some fine performances amongst the youth and reserve sides Murphy was rewarded with a two-year professional contract upon his 17th birthday. Danny was handed his debut in a 3–2 win against Chesterfield under manager Ian Holloway and went on to make 24 league and cup appearances over the following two seasons.

=== Swindon Town and Margate ===
Upon Murphy's release from QPR he agreed to join Swindon Town after a successful pre-season trial. Although the deal was in place, the move failed to be finalised due to financial problems at the Wiltshire-based club. Dropping out of the Football League, Murphy then joined conference side Margate in the fifth tier of English football. Although becoming first choice left back, Danny decided to join Cork City after only 12 games at the club.

=== Cork City ===
He signed for Cork City in 2004 and made his League of Ireland debut on the opening day . He helped them win the League of Ireland title in 2005. He became a fan favourite at Turners Cross and earned him the sobriquet The Cockney Rebel.

=== Motherwell ===
Murphy joined Motherwell on 1 January 2007 when his contract at Cork expired, making his debut as a substitute in the Steelmen's 1–0 defeat by Rangers the following day. Murphy followed up his Motherwell debut with some fine displays at Hibernian and Celtic and added his first league goal at Dundee United before an ankle injury cut short his season.

=== Dunfermline Athletic ===
By November 2007, Murphy had fallen out-of-favour under new manager Mark McGhee and he was loaned to First Division side Dunfermline Athletic until January. After some good form with the Pars, new manager Jim McIntyre decided to extend Murphy's loan deal to the end of January.

=== Return to Cork ===
On 25 February 2008, Murphy returned to Ireland, re-signing with Cork City under new manager Alan Mathews. He was released in 2010 as a result of the club's financial difficulties.

=== Shamrock Rovers ===
Murphy signed for Shamrock Rovers in February 2010 on a two-year contract. He won his second League of Ireland Premier Division title while at the club, while finishing as runner-up in the FAI Cup. Murphy's contract was mutually terminated in December 2010 so he could return south to be near his family.

=== Cork City ===
Murphy rejoined Cork City in December 2010.

== Coaching career ==
Murphy coached in women's football for six years, including two years as manager of Welling United's women's section, before being appointed Cork City WFC manager in May 2022.

== Honours ==
Cork City

- League of Ireland (1): 2005
- Setanta Sports Cup (1): 2008
- League of Ireland First Division (1): 2011

Shamrock Rovers

- League of Ireland (1): 2010
