= League of Ireland XI =

Football representative team of the League of Ireland

- Association: Football Association of Ireland
- Head coach: Damien Richardson 2010-
- Home stadium: Dalymount Park 1924–1987; Aviva Stadium 2010–
First colours	Second colours

First international
- (Republic of Ireland) League of Ireland XI 3–3 Welsh League XI (Wales) (Dalymount Park, Ireland; 19 February 1924)

Biggest defeat
- Scottish League XI 11–0 League of Ireland XI (Republic of Ireland) (Celtic Park, Glasgow, Scotland; 28 November 1962)

The League of Ireland XI is the representative team of the League of Ireland, the national association football league of Ireland. Also referred to as the Airtricity League XI for sponsorship reasons, for much of its history, the team has effectively acted as a reserve or B team to the senior Republic of Ireland national team, providing international representative honours to home-based players. In fact it has played considerably more games than the actual Republic of Ireland B national football team. In addition to playing regular games against similar representative teams, such as the Irish League XI, the Scottish Football League XI and the Football League XI, the League of Ireland XI has also played in prestige friendlies against the full national teams of both Argentina and Brazil. The League of Ireland XI also represented Ireland in the qualifying stages of the 1988 Olympic Football Tournament. More recently a League of Ireland U-23 XI has represented the Republic of Ireland in the International Challenge Trophy. Meanwhile, a senior team with no age or nationality restriction regularly plays visiting club sides. More recently the team competed in the 2011 Dublin Super Cup.

== History ==
=== 1920s and 1930s ===
During the 1920s and 1930s, the four national associations that made up the International Football Association Board (IFAB)– The Football Association, the Scottish Football Association, the Football Association of Wales and Northern Ireland's Irish Football Association – refused to recognise the rights of the Football Association of Ireland (FAI) when it came arranging full internationals. Consequently, the FAI could not arrange full internationals against its nearest neighbours. The IFAB, however, did permit inter-league games to be played. In the absence of full internationals against England, Scotland, Wales or Northern Ireland, these inter-league matches between the League of Ireland XI, the Irish League XI, the Welsh Football League XI and the Scottish Football League XI were highly regarded by both the FAI and Irish football fans alike. Attendances of up to 30,000 at these matches at Dalymount Park led them to have been treated almost as full internationals.

The League of Ireland XI made their official debut with a 3–3 draw against a Welsh Football League XI on 9 February 1924. Ernie MacKay scored the representative team's first ever goal while Dave Roberts added the other two. The League of Ireland XI played the Irish League XI for the first time on 13 March 1926. Charlie Dowdall scored twice in a 3–1 win for the home team. On St. Patrick's Day, 1937, a League of Ireland XI also played and defeated visiting Yugoslav side SK Jugoslavija 3–2. The League of Ireland XI played the Scottish League XI for the first time on St. Patrick's Day, 1939. The Scottish team was billed as a team of all-stars and had a combined valuation estimated to be £60,000. In front of a crowd of 35,000 at Dalymount Park, the League of Ireland XI defeated the Scottish League XI with Johnny Johnstone and Paddy Bradshaw scoring the goals in the 2–1 win

=== National team ===
The League of Ireland XI has always enjoyed a close relationship with the senior Republic of Ireland national team. When Ireland competed at both the 1924 and 1948 Olympic Football Tournaments, they were represented by League of Ireland XIs made up of amateur players. On at least three further occasions before the Second World War, the FAI selected a full international team entirely made up of players playing in Ireland. On 21 March 1926, for the game against Italy, the Ireland team even featured Drumcondra’s Joe Grace from the Leinster Senior League. It was a League of Ireland XI that played Belgium on 12 February 1928 and then the Netherlands on 8 December 1935. Before the Second World War, League of Ireland players made up the nucleus of just about every FAI Ireland full international team.

=== Post-Second World War ===
For most of the Second World War era, the League of Ireland XI's only opponents were the Irish League XI. However once the conflict ended, the fixture against the Scottish League XI was revived. They also began to play the Football League XI on a regular basis. With the majority of the leading Irish players now playing in the Football League, however, the League of Ireland XI now found itself at a disadvantage. As a result, the majority of the games they played against the Scottish League XI and the Football League XI usually ended in heavy defeat. However, there was the occasional success story. On 2 October 1963 at Dalymount Park, the League of Ireland XI defeated the Football League XI 2–1, thanks to goals from Eddie Bailham and Ronnie Whelan. This Football League XI included four players – Ray Wilson, Bobby Moore, Roger Hunt and Martin Peters – who subsequently went on to help England win the 1966 FIFA World Cup. At the time Whelan was working for Unidaire, a Finglas-based electrical firm, and he subsequently received a warning from his boss at the company for taking time off to play in this game.

=== Prestige Friendlies ===
From the late 1970s onwards, the League of Ireland XI also began to play friendlies against national teams. These included two prestige games against the full Argentina national team. On 19 April 1978, at the Estadio Alberto J. Armando, Argentina played the League of Ireland XI in a warm up game as part of their preparations for hosting the 1978 FIFA World Cup. A team that included the former England international Bobby Tambling and several Republic of Ireland internationals such as Johnny Giles, Ray Treacy, Eamonn Gregg, Noel Synnott, Cathal Muckian, Jerome Clark and Synan Braddish lost 3–1 to a very strong Argentina. The starting eleven for Argentina included ten players who later played in the 1978 FIFA World Cup Final in which Argentina beat the Netherlands 3–1. In addition a young Diego Maradona also came on as a substitute. Leopoldo Luque, Oscar Ortiz and Ricardo Villa scored for Argentina before Synan Braddish grabbed a consolation goal for the league select. On 29 May 1979, Argentina, then the reigning World Cup holders, visited Lansdowne Road and were held to a 0–0 draw by a Republic of Ireland XI in a UNICEF fundraiser; this team is sometimes incorrectly listed as a League of Ireland XI. 30 April 1980 saw the League of Ireland XI play Argentina for a second time, this time at the Estadio Monumental. On this occasion, a team that included Liam Buckley, Terry Eviston, Johnny Walsh and Tommy McConville lost 1–0 to a goal scored by Diego Maradona. A month later, Argentina beat the senior Republic of Ireland 1–0 at Lansdowne Road.

In another notable game from this era, the League of Ireland XI also became the first representative team to play the Basque Country following the ending of the Francoist regime. This game was played on 16 August 1979 at the San Mamés Stadium. The Basque team was made up of Real Sociedad and Athletic Bilbao players and all eleven subsequently became full Spain internationals. In contrast the league select was under strength and was referred to in newspaper reports as a League of Ireland B team. The Basque Country team easily defeated this League of Ireland XI 4–1. In 1981, the League of Ireland XI returned to South America and this time played Brazil. A team managed by Jim McLaughlin lost 6–0 with the legendary Zico scoring four of Brazil's goals.

=== Olympic qualifiers ===
League of Ireland XIs made up of amateur players represented Ireland in qualifiers for the 1960, 1972, 1976 and 1980 Olympic Football Tournaments. For the 1988 Olympic Football Tournament qualifiers, a senior League of Ireland XI featuring professionals represented Ireland. They were drawn in a "group of death" that also included Hungary, Sweden, Spain and France – France had won the gold medal at the 1984 Olympic Football Tournament. This League of Ireland XI was again managed by Jim McLaughlin.

The team kicked off their Olympic campaign with a 2–1 defeat against Hungary at Glenmalure Park on November 11, 1986. Their next opponents were Spain at Tolka Park on February 4, 1987. Goals from Noel Larkin and Mick Byrne saw the League of Ireland XI draw 2–2. Their first away games came against Sweden and France. The League of Ireland XI lost 1–0 to Sweden after they conceded a very late goal but managed to hold France to a 1–1 draw. On August 26, 1987, a crowd of less than 1,000 saw the League of Ireland XI lose 1–0 at Dalymount Park to a Sweden team that included Tomas Brolin. Next came the home match against France on 18 November 1987 at Dalymount Park. A crowd of just 4,000 would witness one of the League of Ireland XI's best results. Two goals from Mick Bennett and one from Peter Eccles saw them gain a 3–0 win. Ireland finished the qualifying group with two away games. Dave Barry scored in Hungary but the League of Ireland XI lost 3–1 while goals from Barry Kehoe and Bennett earned them a 2–2 with Spain in Alicante. The League of Ireland XI finished fourth in the group. Sweden qualified for the finals where they were knocked out in the quarter-finals.

Group C Final Table

Rank	Team	Pld	W	D	L	GF	GA	GD	Pts
1	Sweden	8	6	1	1	13	6	+7	13
2	Hungary	8	5	1	2	13	8	+5	11
3	Spain	8	1	4	3	9	12	−3	6
4	(Republic of Ireland) League of Ireland XI	8	1	3	4	10	12	−2	5
5	France	8	1	3	4	9	16	−7	5

=== 1988 Marlboro Cup ===
In August 1988, the League of Ireland XI competed in the Marlboro Cup, a four team tournament, held at the Los Angeles Memorial Coliseum. They lost their first game 3–0 against Club Universidad de Guadalajara on 5 August, with Mick Neville conceding an own goal. They then lost 1–0 to El Salvador in a third place playoff two days later. The tournament was won by Guatemala, who beat Club Universidad 3–2 in the final.

Date	Team #1	Result	Team #2	Round
August 5, 1988	(Mexico) Club Universidad de Guadalajara	3-0	(Republic of Ireland) League of Ireland XI	Semi-finals
August 5, 1988	El Salvador	1–2	Guatemala	Semi-finals
August 7, 1988	El Salvador	1–0	(Republic of Ireland) League of Ireland XI	Third Place Match
August 7, 1988	Guatemala	3–2	(Mexico) Club Universidad de Guadalajara	Final

=== Aviva Stadium ===
==== Manchester United ====
On 4 August 2010, the League of Ireland XI hosted the first soccer match to be played at the Aviva Stadium. A team managed by Damien Richardson lost 7–1 to Manchester United. The league select were 6–0 down after 70 minutes, with goals from Park Ji-sung (2), Michael Owen, Javier Hernández, Antonio Valencia and Jonny Evans. Park opened the scoring in the 13th minute in bizarre fashion; as he went to block a defender's clearance, the ball ricocheted off him and into the net. Owen doubled United's lead in the 25th minute with a chipped shot over the goalkeeper, before half-time substitute Hernández made it 3–0 two minutes after the break. Three goals in the space of nine minutes from Valencia (60th minute), a second from Park (63rd) and Jonny Evans (69th) increased the lead to 6–0, before Dave Mulcahy scored a consolation goal for the League of Ireland XI in the 78th minute. Nevertheless, there was still time for Nani to get a seventh goal, converting a penalty after Hernández had been fouled in the penalty area.

==== Dublin Super Cup ====
Damien Richardson was again in charge of the League of Ireland XI when the Aviva Stadium hosted the 2011 Dublin Super Cup, a tournament which saw the representative team take on both Manchester City and Celtic. Shamrock Rovers players, however, were not available because of a clash with the 2011–12 UEFA Champions League qualifying phase and play-off rounds. As a result, Richardson had to field an understrength team. They lost their opening game to Manchester City 3–0, then lost 5–0 to Celtic. The League of Ireland XI were the only team in the tournament that didn't win a match or score any goals.

== League of Ireland XI matches ==
Date	Opponents	Result	Score	Competition	Venue	Attendance
February 9, 1924	Welsh Football League XI	D	3–3	friendly	Dalymount Park	
February 23, 1924	Celtic	L	0–3	friendly	Dalymount Park	22,000
March 14, 1925	Welsh Football League XI	L	1–2	friendly	Dalymount Park	17,000
November 7, 1925	Welsh Football League XI	D	2–2	friendly	Swansea	
March 13, 1926	Irish League XI	W	3–1	friendly	Dalymount Park	18,000
March 5, 1927	Irish League XI	D	1–1	friendly	Windsor Park	15,000
April 2, 1927	Welsh Football League XI	L	1–2	friendly	Dalymount Park	7,000
March 10, 1928	Irish League XI	W	3–1	friendly	Shelbourne Park	12,000
October 6, 1928	Welsh Football League XI	W	4–3	friendly	Dalymount Park	
March 9, 1929	Irish League XI	L	1–2	friendly	The Oval	15,000
March 1, 1930	Irish League XI	L	1–6	friendly	Dalymount Park	12,000
May 3, 1930	Welsh Football League XI	L	1–6	friendly	Swansea	
October 16, 1932	Welsh Football League XI	W	2–0	friendly	Dalymount Park	
March 18, 1935	Welsh Football League XI	W	2–1	friendly		
March 17, 1937	Yugoslav League XI	W	3–2	friendly	Dalymount Park	
March 17, 1938	Irish League XI	L	1–3	friendly	Dalymount Park	30,000
March 11, 1939	Irish League XI	W	2–1	friendly	Windsor Park	11,000
March 17, 1939	Scottish Football League XI	W	2–1	friendly	Dalymount Park	35,000
March 18, 1940	Irish League XI	W	2–0	friendly	Dalymount Park	26,000
March 17, 1941	Irish League XI	L	3–8	friendly	Dalymount Park	6,000
April 14, 1941	Irish League XI	L	1–2	friendly	Windsor Park	25,000
March 17, 1942	Irish League XI	D	2–2	friendly	Dalymount Park	31,000
April 6, 1942	Irish League XI	L	2–5	friendly	Windsor Park	30,000
March 17, 1943	Irish League XI	L	0–1	friendly	Dalymount Park	28,000
April 26, 1943	Irish League XI	D	2–2	friendly	Windsor Park	21,000
March 17, 1944	Irish League XI	L	3–4	friendly	Dalymount Park	28,000
April 10, 1944	Irish League XI	D	2–2	friendly	Windsor Park	35,000
March 17, 1945	Irish League XI	W	2–1	friendly	Dalymount Park	36,000
April 2, 1945	Irish League XI	W	5–3	friendly	Windsor Park	32,000
March 18, 1946	Irish League XI	L	1–2	friendly	Dalymount Park	37,000
April 22, 1946	Irish League XI	L	0–3	friendly	Windsor Park	32,000
March 17, 1947	Irish League XI	D	2–2	friendly	Dalymount Park	20,000
April 7, 1947	Irish League XI	W	1–0	friendly	Windsor Park	30,000
April 30, 1947	Football League XI	L	1-3	friendly	Dalymount Park	
March 17, 1948	Irish League XI	W	2–1	friendly	Dalymount Park	25,000
March 29, 1948	Irish League XI	L	0–4	friendly	Windsor Park	
April 14, 1948	Football League XI	L	0-4	friendly	Deepdale	
April 24, 1948	Scottish Football League XI	L	0–2	friendly	Dalymount Park	25,000
September 29, 1948	Scottish Football League XI	L	1–5	friendly	Ibrox Stadium	57,600
March 17, 1949	Irish League XI	D	0–0	friendly	Dalymount Park	20,000
April 18, 1949	Irish League XI	L	1–4	friendly	Windsor Park	25,000
May 4, 1949	Football League XI	L	0–5	friendly	Dalymount Park	
October 19, 1949	Scottish Football League XI	L	0–1	friendly	Dalymount Park	17,000
February 15, 1950	Football League XI	L	0–7	friendly	Molineux Stadium	
March 17, 1950	Irish League XI	W	3–1	friendly	Dalymount Park	18,000
April 10, 1950	Irish League XI	D	2–2	friendly	Windsor Park	10,000
January 17, 1951	Scottish Football League XI	L	0–7	friendly	Celtic Park	10,000
April 4, 1951	Football League XI	L	0–1	friendly	Dalymount Park	
October 10, 1951	Football League XI	L	1–9	friendly	Goodison Park	
March 17, 1952	Scottish Football League XI	L	0–2	friendly	Dalymount Park	33,000
May 2, 1952	United States men's soccer team	W	4–0	friendly	Dalymount Park	8,000
October 8, 1952	Scottish Football League XI	L	1–5	friendly	Celtic Park	10,000
March 17, 1953	Football League XI	L	0–2	friendly	Dalymount Park	
April 22, 1953	Irish League XI	L	0–3	friendly	Dalymount Park	16,000
September 23, 1953	Welsh Football League XI	W	3–1	friendly	Dalymount Park	
February 10, 1954	Football League XI	L	1–9	friendly	Maine Road	
March 17, 1954	Scottish Football League XI	L	1–3	friendly	Dalymount Park	35,000
April 19, 1954	Irish League XI	D	0–0	friendly	Windsor Park	
May 2, 1954	Hessenliga	W	1–0	friendly	Dalymount Park	
September 22, 1954	Football League XI	L	0–6	friendly	Dalymount Park	
November 18, 1954	Scottish Football League XI	L	0–5	friendly	Shawfield Stadium	18,000
March 17, 1955	Irish League XI	W	2–1	friendly	Dalymount Park	30,000
May 14, 1955	Hessenliga	L	2–7	friendly	Frankfurt	
May 19, 1955	Hessenliga	L	0–5	friendly	Kassel	
September 21, 1955	Scottish Football League XI	L	2–4	friendly	Dalymount Park	
December 7, 1955	Football League XI	L	1–5	friendly	Goodison Park	
February 12, 1956	Hessenliga	W	4–1	friendly	Dalymount Park	
March 17, 1956	Irish League XI	W	1–0	friendly	Dalymount Park	23,000
April 2, 1956	Irish League XI	L	0–6	friendly	Windsor Park	20,000
September 19, 1956	Football League XI	D	3–3	friendly	Dalymount Park	
September 26, 1956	Scottish Football League XI	L	1–3	friendly	Shawfield Stadium	23,000
March 18, 1957	Irish League XI	D	2–2	friendly	Dalymount Park	28,000
April 22, 1957	Irish League XI	W	2–1	friendly	Windsor Park	15,000
September 18, 1957	Scottish Football League XI	L	1–5	friendly	Dalymount Park	23,000
October 19, 1957	Football League XI	L	1–3	friendly	Elland Road	
March 17, 1958	Irish League XI	D	2–2	friendly	Dalymount Park	32,000
April 7, 1958	Irish League XI	L	1–3	friendly	Solitude Ground	29,000
September 24, 1958	Scottish Football League XI	L	0–1	friendly	Ibrox Stadium	9,000
October 29, 1958	Irish League XI	W	3–2	friendly	Windsor Park	5,000
March 17, 1959	Football League XI	D	0–0	friendly	Dalymount Park	
September 2, 1959	Scottish Football League XI	L	1–4	friendly	Dalymount Park	26,000
November 4, 1959	Football League XI	L	0–2	friendly	Ewood Park	
March 17, 1960	Hessenliga	W	5–2	friendly	Dalymount Park	
April 12, 1960	Irish League XI	W	2–1	friendly	Tolka Park	8,000
September 14, 1960	Football League XI	L	0–1	friendly	Dalymount Park	
October 5, 1960	Scottish Football League XI	L	1–5	friendly	Celtic Park	23,000
March 17, 1961	Irish League XI	L	2–3	friendly	Dalymount Park	12,000
April 3, 1961	Irish League XI	D	1–1	friendly	Solitude Ground	22,000
September 6, 1961	Scottish Football League XI	D	1–1	friendly	Dalymount Park	6,000
October 11, 1961	Football League XI	L	2–5	friendly	Eastville Stadium	
March 17, 1962	Italian League B	L	0–3	friendly	Dalymount Park	
April 4, 1962	Irish League XI	L	1–3	friendly	Windsor Park	4,000
May 6, 1962	Italian League B	L	0–6	friendly	Rimini	
November 28, 1962	Scottish Football League XI	L	0–11	friendly	Celtic Park	8,000
March 18, 1963	Irish League XI	L	1–3	friendly	Dalymount Park	15,000
October 2, 1963	Football League XI	W	2–1	friendly	Dalymount Park	30,000
March 17, 1964	Irish League XI	W	4–2	friendly	Dalymount Park	8,000
April 15, 1964	Irish League XI	D	2–2	friendly	Windsor Park	7,000
May 25, 1964	International XI			friendly	Flower Lodge	20,000
September 23, 1964	Scottish Football League XI	D	2–2	friendly	Dalymount Park	25,000
May 14, 1965	Irish League XI	L	1–0	friendly	Flower Lodge	3,500
October 27, 1965	Football League XI	L	0–5	friendly	Boothferry Park	28,283
September 7, 1966	Scottish Football League XI	L	0–6	friendly	Celtic Park	12,000
March 22, 1967	Irish League XI	L	1–3	friendly	Windsor Park	6,000
October 25, 1967	Irish League XI	W	3–2	friendly	Dalymount Park	10,000
November 8, 1967	Football League XI	L	2–7	friendly	Dalymount Park	27,000
September 4, 1968	Scottish Football League XI	D	0–0	friendly	Dalymount Park	25,000
April 9, 1969	Irish League XI	W	2–1	friendly	Windsor Park	5,000
September 10, 1969	Football League XI	L	0–3	friendly	Oakwell	
March 17, 1970	Irish League XI	L	0–2	friendly	Dalymount Park	10,000
September 2, 1970	Scottish Football League XI	L	0–1	friendly	Celtic Park	7,654
November 27, 1970	Australian League XI	W	1–0	friendly	Dalymount Park	
September 22, 1971	Football League XI	L	1–2	friendly	Lansdowne Road	
February 3, 1972	Italian League B	D	1–1	friendly	Dalymount Park	
March 22, 1973	Italian League B	L	0–2	friendly	Catanzaro	
March 18, 1974	Irish League XI	W	3–2	friendly	Dalymount Park	2,000
December 1, 1974	Torpedo Moscow	D	0–0	friendly	Dalymount Park	
August 19, 1976	Torino F.C.	D	0–0	friendly	Dalymount Park	2,000
January 19, 1977	Italian League B	L	0–2	friendly	Udine	22,000
March 16, 1977	Italian League B	W	2–0	friendly	Oriel Park	
September 21, 1977	Republic of Ireland	L	1–2	friendly	Dalymount Park	
April 19, 1978	Argentina	L	1–3	friendly	Estadio Alberto J. Armando	
August 2, 1978	Liverpool	L	1–3	friendly	Lansdowne Road	25,000
April 14, 1979	Italian League B	L	0–1	friendly	Mantua	
June 23, 1979	Malaysia League XI	L	0–1	friendly	Kuala Lumpur	25,000
June 25, 1979	Singapore	W	4–1	friendly		
August 16, 1979	Basque Country	L	1–4	friendly	San Mamés Stadium	40,000
October 12, 1979	New Zealand	W	2–1	friendly	Tolka Park	
March 17, 1980	Scottish Football League XI	W	2–1	friendly	Dalymount Park	5,000
April 30, 1980	Argentina	L	0–1	friendly	Estadio Monumental	
April 15, 1981	Irish League XI	W	1–0	friendly	Tolka Park	2,000
September 23, 1981	Brazil	L	0–6	friendly	Estádio Rei Pelé	54,000
June 8, 1982	New Zealand	L	0–1	friendly	Rotorua	
June 9, 1982	New Zealand	L	0–1	friendly	Rotorua	
June 12, 1982	New Zealand	D	0–0	friendly	Gisborne, New Zealand	12,000
June 16, 1982	New Zealand	W	2–1	friendly	Dunedin	
June 19, 1982	New Zealand	L	0–1	friendly	Invercargill	
April 27, 1983	Italian League B	L	0–2	friendly	Stadio Olimpico	
August 20, 1983	Newcastle United	L	0–3	friendly	St James' Park	
February 14, 1984	Italian League B	D	0–0	friendly	Padua	
October 30, 1984	Irish League XI	L	0–4	friendly	Windsor Park	873
March 17, 1986	Irish League XI	W	2–1	friendly	Tolka Park	1,500
April 28, 1986	Iraq	L	0–1	friendly	Al-Shaab Stadium	25,000
August 28, 1986	Saudi Arabia	D	1–1	friendly	National Stadium, Singapore	
August 31,1986	Saudi Arabia	L	0–3	friendly	National Stadium, Singapore	
November 19, 1986	Hungary	L	1–2	Olympic qualifier	Glenmalure Park	
February 4, 1987	Spain	D	2–2	Olympic qualifier	Tolka Park	
March 17, 1987	Irish League XI	L	1–2	friendly	The Showgrounds	700
June 5, 1987	Sweden	L	0–1	Olympic qualifier	Solna	
August 11, 1987	France	D	1–1	Olympic qualifier	Dunkirk	
August 26, 1987	Sweden	L	0–1	Olympic qualifier	Dalymount Park	
November 18, 1987	France	W	3–0	Olympic qualifier	Dalymount Park	
May 4, 1988	Hungary	L	1–3	Olympic qualifier	Budapest	
May 18, 1988	Spain	D	2–2	Olympic qualifier	Alicante	
August 5, 1988	Club Universidad de Guadalajara	L	0–3	Marlboro Cup	Los Angeles Memorial Coliseum	
August 7, 1988	El Salvador	D	0–1	Marlboro Cup	Los Angeles Memorial Coliseum	
May 17, 1989	Irish League XI	W	3–0	friendly	Oriel Park	500
June 18, 1989	Ecuador	D	1–1	friendly	Trinidad	
June 20, 1989	Trinidad and Tobago	L	0–1	friendly	Trinidad	
May 7, 1990	Irish League XI	W	1–0	friendly	The Oval	500
November 19, 1991	Irish League XI	L	0–2	friendly	Tolka Park	2,000
July 17, 1992	Celtic F.C.	L	0–5	friendly	Tolka Park	
July 18, 1992	Manchester City	L	0–3	friendly	Tolka Park	
July 23, 1993	Leeds United	D	2–2	friendly	Tolka Park	
August 6, 1993	Blackburn Rovers	L	0–1	friendly	Tolka Park	
August 17, 1993	Czechoslovakia XI	L	1–4	friendly	Tolka Park	
August 19, 1993	Liverpool	L	1–2	friendly	Lansdowne Road	
October 7, 1994	Welsh Football League XI	W	2–0	friendly	Porthmadog	
November 8, 1994	IFK Göteborg	W	1–0	friendly	Tolka Park	
March 7, 1995	Irish League XI	D	1–1	friendly	Richmond Park	600
April 2, 1996	Welsh Football League XI	L	0–1	friendly	St Colman's Park	
June 5, 1996	Croatia	D	2–2	friendly	Hunky Dorys Park	
June 11, 1996	South Korea U23	D	1–1	friendly	AUL Complex	
July 28, 1996	Manchester United	L	1–4	friendly	Tolka Park	7,720
February 25, 1997	England C	W	2–0	friendly	Richmond Park	
March 4, 1997	Welsh Football League XI	W	1–0	friendly	Leckwith	
March 17, 1997	Republic of Ireland B	D	1–1	friendly	Tolka Park	
September 2, 1997	Republic of Ireland	L	0–3	friendly	Tolka Park	
February 9, 1999	Republic of Ireland B	L	3–4	friendly	Carlisle Grounds	
November 1, 2000	Irish League XI	L	0–2	friendly	Terryland Park	350
August 4, 2010	Manchester United	L	1–7	friendly	Aviva Stadium	49,800
July 30, 2011	Manchester City	L	0–3	Dublin Super Cup	Aviva Stadium	
July 31, 2011	Celtic	L	0–5	Dublin Super Cup	Aviva Stadium	

== Recent squad ==
The following players were called up for the 2011 Dublin Super Cup

No.	Pos.	Player	Date of birth (age)	Caps	Goals	Club
1	GK	(Republic of Ireland) Gerard Doherty	24 August 1981 (aged 29)			(Football Association of Ireland) Derry City
16	GK	(Republic of Ireland) Barry Murphy	8 June 1985 (aged 26)			(Football Association of Ireland) Bohemians
2	DF	(Republic of Ireland) Owen Heary	4 October 1976 (aged 34)			(Football Association of Ireland) Bohemians
4	DF	(Republic of Ireland) Aidan Price	8 December 1981 (aged 29)			(Football Association of Ireland) Bohemians
5	DF	(Republic of Ireland) Ryan McBride	15 December 1989 (aged 21)			(Football Association of Ireland) Derry City
6	DF	(Republic of Ireland) Ger O'Brien	2 July 1984 (aged 27)			(Football Association of Ireland) Bohemians
14	DF	(Northern Ireland) Daniel Lafferty	1 April 1989 (aged 22)			(Football Association of Ireland) Derry City
18	DF	(Republic of Ireland) Shane McEleney	31 January 1991 (aged 20)			(Football Association of Ireland) Derry City
	DF	(Scotland) Stewart Greacen	31 March 1982 (aged 29)			(Football Association of Ireland) Derry City
	DF	(Republic of Ireland) Simon Madden	1 May 1988 (aged 23)			(Football Association of Ireland) Derry City
	DF	(Republic of Ireland) Danny Murphy	4 December 1982 (aged 28)			(Football Association of Ireland) Cork City
7	MF	(Republic of Ireland) Daniel Kearns	26 August 1991 (aged 19)			(Football Association of Ireland) Dundalk
8	MF	(Republic of Ireland) Joe Gamble	14 January 1982 (aged 29)			(Football Association of Ireland) Limerick
11	MF	(Republic of Ireland) James McClean	22 April 1989 (aged 22)			(Football Association of Ireland) Derry City
12	MF	(Northern Ireland) Ruaidhri Higgins	23 October 1984 (aged 26)			(Football Association of Ireland) Derry City
13	MF	(England) John Dillon	26 August 1991 (aged 19)			(Football Association of Ireland) Sligo Rovers
15	MF	(Northern Ireland) Barry Molloy	29 November 1983 (aged 27)			(Football Association of Ireland) Derry City
17	MF	(England) Dean Bennett	13 December 1977 (aged 33)			(Football Association of Ireland) Dundalk
19	MF	(Republic of Ireland) John Russell	18 May 1985 (aged 26)			(Football Association of Ireland) Sligo Rovers
20	MF	(Republic of Ireland) Stephen McLaughlin	14 June 1990 (aged 21)			(Football Association of Ireland) Derry City
21	MF	(Republic of Ireland) Gareth McGlynn	29 October 1982 (aged 28)			(Football Association of Ireland) Derry City
23	MF	(England) Danny Ventre	23 January 1986 (aged 25)			(Football Association of Ireland) Sligo Rovers
9	FW	(Libya) Éamon Zayed	4 October 1983 (aged 27)			(Football Association of Ireland) Derry City
10	FW	(Republic of Ireland) Daryl Kavanagh	11 August 1986 (aged 24)			(Football Association of Ireland) St Patrick's Athletic
22	FW	(Republic of Ireland) Jason Byrne	23 February 1978 (aged 33)			(Football Association of Ireland) Dundalk

== Non-Irish players ==
Throughout the history of the League of Ireland, the vast majority of the players have come from either the Republic of Ireland or Northern Ireland. Consequently, the League of Ireland XI has largely been made up of Irish players. However, there has always been a contingent of non-Irish players and, right from the beginning, they have been selected to play for the League of Ireland XI. Dave Roberts from England scored twice in the team's very first game. Another English-born player, Johnny Matthews, scored a penalty against Gordon Banks when the League of Ireland XI played the Football League XI in 1971 at Lansdowne Road. Like Roberts and Matthews, most of the non-Irish players have come from Great Britain but some have come from further afield.

- (England) Dave Roberts 1924–27
- (England) Charlie Heinemann 1927
- (Wales) Len Richards 1935
- (Scotland) Pat Broadley 1949–50
- (England) Johnny Matthews 1970–71
- (England) Dave Bacuzzi 1971–72
- (England) Bobby Tambling 1977–78
- (Guam) Ryan Guy 2010
- (Cameroon) Joseph N'Do 2010
- (England) Dean Bennett 2011
- (Scotland) Stewart Greacen 2011
- (England) Danny Ventre 2011
