= FAI Youth Cup =

- Organiser(s): Football Association of Ireland
- Founded: 1934
- Region: Republic of Ireland
- Current champions: College Corinthians (1st title)
- Most championships: Home Farm (11 titles)
- Website: FAI Youth Cup @ www.fai.ie

The FAI Youth Cup, also known as the FAI Umbro Youth Challenge Cup, is a cup competition organised by the Football Association of Ireland (FAI) for under-18 association football teams in the Republic of Ireland.

Originally known as the Free State Minor Cup, and later the FAI Minor Cup, the first competition was held in 1934–35 and the inaugural winners were Greenmount Rangers. The competition's most successful club has been Home Farm who have won the cup eleven times. They have also been finalists on a further seven occasions. In 1964–65 Home Farm provided both finalists; an A team, featuring Terry Conroy and Billy Newman, played a Home Farm B team in the final at Tolka Park. The cup is currently sponsored by Umbro. In August 2025, the FAI announced the competition would move to a calendar season format.

== List of finals ==
Date	Winner	Score	Runners-up	Venue
2024–25	College Corinthians	2–1	Mervue United	Eamonn Deacy Park
2023–24	St. Kevin's	3–0	Pike Rovers	Whitehall Stadium
2022–23	St. Joseph’s A.F.C (Dublin)	1–0	College Corinthians	Carlisle Grounds
2021–22	Douglas Hall (Cork)	3–2	Ringmahon Rangers (Cork)	Turners Cross
2020–21	did not take place due to the COVID-19 pandemic			
2019–20	Killarney Celtic	3–3 (3–2P)	Douglas Hall (Cork)	Mounthawk Park
2018–19	Mervue United	4–0	Stella Maris	Eamonn Deacy Park
2017–18	Tramore AFC	1–0	Carrigaline United AFC	Turners Cross (Note: Information appears to be taken from the U17 FAI Cup final.)
2016–17	Leeside AFC	6–0	Aisling Annacrotty	Jackman Park
2015–16	Ballincollig (Cork)	3–1	Ringmahon Rangers (Cork)	Turners Cross
2014–15	Bohemians U18	4–0	Kilreen Celtic (Cork)	Pearse Park
2013–14	Nenagh A.F.C. (Tipperary)	1–1 (Note: Nenagh A.F.C. won 4–2 on penalties)	Evergreen (Kilkenny)	The Prince Grounds, Castlecomer
2012–13	Castleview (Cork)	4–0	Castlebar Celtic	Turners Cross
2011–12	Wexford Youths	2–1 (a.e.t.)	Mount Merrion (Dublin)	
2010–11	Cork City	4–1	Killarney Celtic	Turners Cross
2009–10	Fairview Rangers	1–0	Mervue United	Jackman Park
2008–09	Cork City	2–1	Salthill Devon	Turners Cross
2007–08	Wexford Youths	4–0	Dundalk	Ferrycarrig Park
2006–07	Castlebar Celtic	2–1	Everton A.F.C. (Cork)	Milebush Park, Castlebar
2005–06	Cork City		Rangers CYM	
2004–05	Belvedere	4–1	Sligo Rovers	Richmond Park
2003–04	Erris United (Mayo)	3–0	Letterkenny Rovers	Milebush Park, Castlebar
2002–03	Tolka Rovers	1–1	Fenit Samphires (Kerry)	
Replay	Tolka Rovers	2–1 (a.e.t.)	Fenit Samphires (Kerry)	
2001–02	Bohemians U19		Peake Villa (Thurles)	
2000–01	St Joseph's Boys		St. Kevin's Boys	TBC
1999–2000	Cork City	3–1	Peake Villa (Thurles)	Cooke Park
1998–99	Belvedere		Bohemians U19	
1997–98	Tralee Dynamos	2–1	Stella Maris	Mounthawk Park
1996–97	Drogheda United U19		St. Joseph's Boys	
1995–96	Home Farm		Cloughleigh Celtic (Clare)	
1994–95	St. Michael's		Salthill Devon U19	
1993–94	Stella Maris (Note: http://www.fai.ie lists Stella Maris as 1993–94 winners. The FAI Yearbook & Diary 1995 omits the 1993–94 final. Other sources, including the Tipperary Southern & District Football League website, claim St. Michael's won the cup in both 1993–94 and 1994–95)		St. Michael's	
1992–93	Cherry Orchard		Rangers	
1991–92	Rangers		St. Michael's	
1990–91	Belvedere	3–0	East End United (Kilkenny)	
1989–90	Cherry Orchard		Milford United (Note: FAI Yearbook & Diary 1995 lists runners-up as Wilton United while www.fai.ie lists runners-up as Milford United)	
1988–89	Dungarvan United		Milford United	
1987–88	Rivermount Boys		Wembley Rovers	
1986–87	Tolka Rovers		Rivermount Boys	
1985–86	St Malachy's		Dundalk U19	
1984–85	Home Farm		Ballynanty Rovers (Limerick)	
1983–84	Athlone Town	3–2	Home Farm	
1982–83	Home Farm	2–1	Athlone Town	
1981–82	Tramore Athletic	3–0	Athlone Town	St Mel's Park
1980–81	St. John Bosco		Buncrana Hearts	
1979–80	Tramore Athletic		Home Farm A	
1978–79	Fanad United	3–1	Shelbourne	Swilly Park
1977–78	St Joseph's Boys		Bohemians (Waterford)	
1976–77	Cambridge Boys		Tramore Athletic	
1975–76	Cambridge Boys		Home Farm	
1974–75	Ballynanty Rovers (Limerick)	2–0	Wembley (Cork)	
1973–74	Stella Maris		Shelbourne	
1972–73	Santos		Drogheda United U19	
1971–72	Drogheda United U19		St. John Bosco	
1970–71	Drogheda United U19		Shelbourne U19	
1969–70	Bolton Athletic	1–0	Bohemians U19	
1968–69	Shelbourne U19		Johnville F.C. (Dublin)	
1967–68	Home Farm		St Francis Boys Club	
1966–67	Wembley (Cork)		Home Farm	
1965–66	Glasheen (Cork)		Shelbourne U19	
1964–65	Home Farm A		Home Farm B	Tolka Park
1963–64	Southend United (Dublin)		Glasheen (Cork)	
1962–63	Southend United (Dublin)		Tower Rovers (Cork)	
1961–62	Home Farm		Tramore Athletic	
1960–61	Shelbourne U19		Shamrock Rovers U19	
1959–60	Drumcondra Minors		Sligo (Note: FAI Yearbook & Diary 1995 lists runners-up as Sligo United while www.fai.ie lists runners-up as Sligo Rovers U19)	
1958–59	Shelbourne U19		Glasheen (Cork)	
1957–58	Tramore Athletic	2–0	Johnville F.C. (Dublin)	Turners Cross
1956–57	Glasheen (Cork)		Athlone Town	
1955–56	Drumcondra Minors		Pike Rovers	
1954–55	Tower Rovers (Cork)		Drumcondra Minors	
1953–54	Glasheen (Cork)		Home Farm	
1952–53	Johnville F.C. (Dublin)		Glasheen (Cork)	
1951–52	Home Farm		Tower Rovers (Cork)	
1950–51	Home Farm		Tower Rovers (Cork)	
1949–50	Pike Rovers		Johnville F.C. (Dublin)	
1948–49	Evergreen United		Donore	
1947–48	Home Farm		Stella Maris	
1946–47	Bohemians (Waterford)		Haverty Rangers	
1945–46	Johnville F.C. (Dublin)		Bohemians U19	
1944–45	St Patrick's Athletic U19		Bohemians U19	
1943–44	Home Farm			
1942–43	No competition			
1941–42	Rossville Minors (Cork)		Western Rovers	
1940–41	Rossville Minors (Cork)		Munster Victoria	
1939–40	Rossville Minors A.F.C. (Dublin)		Munster Victoria	
1938–39	Evergreen United		Sligo United	
1937–38	Glencourt Home		Home Farm	
1936–37	Home Farm		Rockville Minors (Cork)	
1935–36	Home Farm		Drogheda United U19	
1934–35	Greenmount Rangers (Cork)	(Replay)	Drogheda United U19	Dalymount Park
1934–35	Greenmount Rangers (Cork)		Drogheda United U19	TBC

== See also ==
- FAI Junior Cup
