= 2021 FAI Cup =

Tournament details
- Country: Republic of Ireland
- Venue(s): Aviva Stadium, Dublin
- Dates: 9 July 2021 — 28 November 2021
- Teams: 38 (all); 18 (qualifying round); 32 (main competition)

Final positions
- Champions: St Patrick's Athletic (4th title)
- Runners-up: Bohemians

Tournament statistics
- Matches played: 32
- Goals scored: 113 (3.53 per match)
- Top goal scorer: Patrick Hoban – 7 goals
- (Note: All statistics do not include qualifying round)

The 2021 FAI Cup was the 101st edition of the Republic of Ireland's primary national cup competition. This edition features teams from the League of Ireland Premier Division and the First Division, as well as non-league teams. The competition is to begin with qualifying on the week ending 11 July 2021.

The winners of the FAI Cup earns automatic qualification for the 2022–23 UEFA Europa Conference League.

== Qualifying round ==
The draw for the qualifying round took place on 14 June 2021.

A total of 18 teams were in the qualifying round draw. Six teams received byes into the first round of the competition: Bangor GG F.C., Malahide United, Liffey Wanderers, St. Kevin's Boys, Usher Celtic and College Corinthians.

9 July 2021	Oliver Bond Celtic	1–2	Killester Donnycarney	Grangegorman, Dublin 7
19:30	Troy Carey 14'	Report	Sean Rogers 58'; Gary Kenna 80'	Stadium: Grangegorman Astro; Referee: Robert Redmond

10 July 2021	Maynooth University Town	3–1	Bonagee United	Maynooth, County Kildare
14:00	Cillian Duffy 30'; Cillian Duffy 38'; Jack O'Connor 73'	Report	Jack Parke (red card) 42'; Packie Mailey 75'; Packie Mailey (yellow card) (yellow-red card) 82'	Stadium: NUI Maynooth Astro

10 July 2021	Ringmahon Rangers	1–1 (a.e.t.) (1–4 p)	Crumlin United	Mahon, County Cork
15:00	Anthony McAlavey 16'	Report	Alan McGreal 5' (pen.)	Stadium: Ringmahon Park; Referee: Raymond Murphy

10 July 2021	St Mochta's	2–1 (a.e.t.)	Cockhill Celtic	Clonsilla, Dublin 15
16:00	Gareth McCaffrey 59' (pen.); Alan Byrne 95'	Report	Garbhan Friel 3' (pen.)	Stadium: Porterstown Road

10 July 2021	Fairview Rangers	2–2 (a.e.t.) (4–2 p)	Athenry	Garryowen, County Limerick
18:00	Conor Coughlan 5'; Eoin Duff 45'	Report	Cole Connolly 31'; Jamie O'Driscoll 87'	Stadium: Fairgreen; Referee: Brian Higgins

11 July 2021	Kilnamanagh	5–0	Home Farm	Kilnamanagh, Dublin 24
11:00	Dean Clarke 33'; Dean Clarke 53' (pen.); Sean Byrne 60' (pen.); Dean Clarke 74' (pen.); Stephen Kinch 89'	Report		Stadium: Ned Kelly Park

== First round ==
The draw for the first round took place on 13 July 2021.

A total of 32 teams are in the first round draw: 20 teams from the Premier Division and First Division, six teams who received byes from the qualifying round and six winners of the qualifying round.

All ties were played the week ending Sunday 25 July 2021.

Teams in bold advanced to the second round.

Premier Division	First Division	Leinster Senior League	Munster Senior League
**Bohemians**; **Derry City**; Drogheda United; **Dundalk**; **Finn Harps**; **Longford Town**; **Shamrock Rovers**; Sligo Rovers; **St Patrick's Athletic**; **Waterford**	Athlone Town; Bray Wanderers; Cabinteely; **Cobh Ramblers**; **Cork City**; Galway United; Shelbourne; Treaty United; **UCD**; **Wexford**	Bangor Greenhills Greenpark; Crumlin United; **Killester Donnycarney**; **Kilnamanagh**; Liffey Wanderers; Malahide United; **Maynooth University Town**; St Kevin's Boys; **St Mochta's**; Usher Celtic	College Corinthians; Fairview Rangers

23 July 2021	**(2)** Athlone Town	**4–4** (a.e.t.) (**2–4** p)	**Waterford (1)**	Athlone, County Westmeath
19:45	Glen McAuley 75' (pen.); Stephen Meaney 83'; Glen McAuley 88' (pen.); Glen McAuley 120+4'	Report	Anthony Wordsworth 40'; Shane Griffin 53'; Anthony Wordsworth (yellow card) 68' (yellow-red card); Greg Halford 90+1'; George Forrest 120+3'	Stadium: Athlone Town Stadium; Attendance: 200; Referee: Damien McGrath
	**Penalties**
	Gary Comerford (penalty scored); Glen McAuley (penalty scored); Jack Reynolds (penalty missed); Dylan Hand (penalty missed)		Shane Griffin (penalty scored); Cameron Evans (penalty scored); Tunmise Sobowale (penalty scored); John Martin (penalty scored)

23 July 2021	**(1) St Patrick's Athletic**	**6–0**	Bray Wanderers **(2)**	Inchicore, Dublin 8
19:45	Billy King 23'; Jason McClelland 38'; Ben McCormack 55'; Sam Bone 57'; Paddy Barrett 62'; Billy King 77'	Report		Stadium: Richmond Park; Attendance: 750; Referee: John McLoughlin

23 July 2021	**(2) UCD**	**2–0**	Shelbourne **(2)**	Belfield, Dublin 4
19:45	Colm Whelan 56' (pen.); Harvey O'Brien 81'	Report		Stadium: UCD Bowl; Attendance: 200; Referee: David Dunne

23 July 2021	**(2) Wexford**	**3–0**	Cabinteely **(2)**	Crossabeg, County Wexford
19:45	Kyle Robinson 34'; Lorcan Fitzgerald 41' (pen.); Jack Moylan 43'	Report		Stadium: Ferrycarrig Park; Referee: Oliver Moran

23 July 2021	**(3) Maynooth University Town**	**4–0**	Malahide United **(3)**	Maynooth, County Kildare
20:00	Paddy O'Sullivan 17'; Paddy O'Sullivan 32'; Paddy O'Sullivan 43'; Jackson Ryan 73'	Report		Stadium: NUI Maynooth Astro; Referee: John McCarthy

23 July 2021	**(3)** St Kevin's Boys	**1–4**	**Kilnamanagh (3)**	Whitehall, Dublin 9
20:00	Jordan Cromwell 20'	Report	Dean Clarke 6'; Sean Byrne 51'; Gary McCabe 58'; Dean Clarke 77'	Stadium: St Aidan's CBS Astro; Referee: Eddie Reilly

23 July 2021	**(1) Shamrock Rovers**	**2–0**	Galway United **(2)**	Tallaght, Dublin 24
20:00	Rory Gaffney 17'; Dylan Watts 21'	Report		Stadium: Tallaght Stadium; Attendance: 500; Referee: Robert Hennessy

24 July 2021	**(1)** Drogheda United	**1–1** (a.e.t.) (**2–4** p)	**Derry City (1)**	Drogheda, County Louth
15:00	Dinny Corcoran 45+4'; Dane Massey (red card) 53'; James Brown (yellow card) 82' (yellow-red card)	Report	Junior Ogedi-Uzokwe (penalty missed) 53'; Danny Lafferty 90+6' (pen.)	Stadium: Head In The Game Park; Attendance: 200; Referee: Paul McLaughlin
	**Penalties**
	Jake Hyland (penalty scored); James Clarke (penalty missed); Luke Heeney (penalty scored); Killian Phillips (penalty missed)		Joe Thomson (penalty scored); Junior Ogedi-Uzokwe (penalty scored); Cameron McJannet (penalty scored); James Akintunde (penalty missed); Evan McLaughlin (penalty scored)

24 July 2021	**(3)** Fairview Rangers	**0–3** (a.e.t.)	**Finn Harps (1)**	Garryowen, County Limerick
16:00		Report	Seán Boyd 95'; Paul Danagher 111' (o.g.); Barry McNamee 120+3'	Stadium: Fairgreen; Referee: Graham Kelly

24 July 2021	**(3)** Bangor Greenhills Greenpark	**0–5**	**Longford Town (1)**	Mullolagher, County Longford
19:30		Report	Dean Williams 16'; Dylan Grimes 65'; Darragh Nugent 70'; Callum Warfield 89'; Aaron O'Driscoll 90+3'	Stadium: Bishopsgate; Referee: Paul Norton
Note: Bangor GG gave up home advantage to Longford Town as their own home venue Greenhills Park was unsuitable to host the fixture.

25 July 2021	**(3) Killester Donnycarney**	**1–0**	Usher Celtic **(3)**	Killester, Dublin 5
11:00	Eoin Fowler 82'	Report	Jordan Buckley (red card) 90+3'	Stadium: Hadden Park; Referee: Lee Duffy

25 July 2021	**(3)** Crumlin United	**1–2**	**St Mochta's (3)**	Crumlin, Dublin 12
14:00	Liam Brady (red card) 45+2'; Glen Fulham 89'	Report	Mick Daly 5'; Gareth McCaffrey 22'; Liam Brady (red card) 45+2'	Stadium: VEC Captains Road; Referee: Declan Troy

25 July	**(3)** Liffey Wanderers	**0–2** (a.e.t.)	**Cobh Ramblers (2)**	Belfield, Dublin 4
14:00		Report	Nathan O'Connell 94'; Danny O'Connell 116'	Stadium: UCD Bowl; Referee: Gavin Colfer

25 July 2021	**(2)** Treaty United	**0–1** (a.e.t.)	**Dundalk (1)**	Garryowen, County Limerick
14:00	Anthony O'Donnell (red card) 111'	Report	Patrick McEleney 104'	Stadium: Markets Field; Attendance: 200; Referee: Neil Doyle

25 July 2021	**(3)** College Corinthians	**0–5**	**Bohemians (1)**	Turners Cross, County Cork
15:00		Report	Keith Buckley 4'; Aaron Doran 26'; Keith Ward 58' (pen.); Jamie Mullins 79'; Dawson Devoy 90'	Stadium: Turners Cross; Referee: Ray Matthews

25 July 2021	**(1)** Sligo Rovers	**2–3**	**Cork City (2)**	Sligo, County Sligo
17:00	Romeo Parkes 12'; Romeo Parkes 69'	Report	Beineon O'Brien-Whitmarsh 28'; Dylan McGlade 56' (pen.); Dale Holland 89'	Stadium: The Showgrounds; Attendance: 400; Referee: Rob Harvey

Bracketed number denotes which tier team currently plays in

== Second round ==
The draw for the second round was made on 27 July 2021 at 6:30pm.

All ties were set to be played the week ending Sunday 29 August 2021.

Teams in bold advanced to the Quarter-finals.

Premier Division	First Division	Leinster Senior League
**Bohemians**; Derry City; **Dundalk**; **Finn Harps**; Longford Town; Shamrock Rovers; **St Patrick's Athletic**; **Waterford**	Cobh Ramblers; Cork City; **UCD**; **Wexford**	Killester Donnycarney; Kilnamanagh; **Maynooth University Town**; St Mochta's

27 August 2021	**(2)** Cork City	**1–1** (a.e.t.) (**1–4** p)	**St Patrick's Athletic (1)**	Turners Cross, County Cork
19:45	Barry Coffey 90+5'	Report	Chris Forrester 90' (pen.)	Stadium: Turners Cross; Attendance: 900; Referee: Derek Tomney
	**Penalties**
	Dylan McGlade (penalty scored); Barry Coffey (penalty missed); Darragh Crowley (penalty missed)		Chris Forrester (penalty scored); Ben McCormack (penalty scored); Jason McClelland (penalty scored); Alfie Lewis (penalty scored)

27 August 2021	**(1) Dundalk**	**5–1**	St Mochta's **(3)**	Dundalk, County Louth
19:45	Sami Ben Amar 8'; Patrick Hoban 51' (pen.); Patrick Hoban 52'; Patrick Hoban 61'; Jeongwoo Han 73'	Report	Gareth McCaffrey 12'	Stadium: Oriel Park; Attendance: 500; Referee: Graham Kelly

27 August 2021	**(2) UCD**	**2–1**	Longford Town **(1)**	Belfield, Dublin 4
19:45	Paul Doyle 69'; Colm Whelan 80'	Report	Dean Williams 71'	Stadium: UCD Bowl; Attendance: 500; Referee: Adriano Reale

27 August 2021	**(1) Waterford**	**4–1**	Kilnamanagh **(3)**	Waterford City, County Waterford
19:45	John Martin 35'; Cameron Evans 57'; John Martin 62'; Phoenix Patterson 82'	Report	Adam Buckley 85'	Stadium: RSC; Attendance: 552; Referee: Rob Hennessy

27 August 2021	**(1) Finn Harps**	**1–0**	Derry City **(1)**	Ballybofey, County Donegal
20:00	Tunde Owolabi 74' (pen.)	Report		Stadium: Finn Park; Attendance: 800; Referee: Rob Harvey

28 August 2021	**Maynooth University Town (3)**	**3–2**	Cobh Ramblers **(2)**	Baldonnel, Dublin 22
19:00	John Kavanagh 18' (o.g.); Jack O'Connor 73'; Jackson Ryan 81'	Report	Conor Drinan 90+4'; John Kavanagh (red card) 76'; Jason Abbott 78' (pen.)	Stadium: John Hyland Park; Attendance: 200; Referee: Alan Patchell

29 August 2021	**(3)** Killester Donnycarney	**0–2**	**Wexford (2)**	Hadden Park, Killester
14:00	Ryan Robinson (red card) 64'	Report	Tyler Dunphy 56'; Karl Manahan 66'	Stadium: Hadden Park; Attendance: 200; Referee: Kevin O'Sullivan

29 August 2021	**Bohemians (1)**	**2–1**	Shamrock Rovers **(1)**	Phibsborough, Dublin 7
16:00	Ali Coote 55'; Georgie Kelly (red card) 80'; Andy Lyons 87'	Report	Roberto Lopes 78'; Ronan Finn (yellow card) 80' (yellow-red card)	Stadium: Dalymount Park; Attendance: 800; Referee: Neil Doyle

== Quarter-finals ==
The draw for the quarter-finals was made on 31 August 2021 at 6:30pm.

All ties were set to be played the week ending Sunday 19 September 2021.

Teams in bold advanced to the Semi-finals.

Premier Division	First Division	Leinster Senior League
**Bohemians**; **Dundalk**; Finn Harps; **St Patrick's Athletic**; **Waterford**	UCD; Wexford	Maynooth University Town

17 September 2021	**(1) Bohemians**	**4–0**	Maynooth University Town (3)	Phibsborough, Dublin 7
19:45	Keith Buckley 17'; Conor Levingston 34'; Keith Ward 36'; Roland Idowu 61'	Report	Alex Kelly (red card) 32'	Stadium: Dalymount Park; Attendance: 1,800; Referee: Adriano Reale

17 September 2021	**(1) St Patrick's Athletic**	**3–0**	Wexford (2)	Inchicore, Dublin 8
19:45	Sam Bone (red card) 7'; Darragh Burns 33'; Darragh Burns 63'; Ronan Coughlan 90+4'	Report	Conor Crowley (yellow card) 40' (yellow-red card)	Stadium: Richmond Park; Attendance: 2,500; Referee: Derek Tomney

17 September 2021	(2) UCD	**2–3**	**Waterford (1)**	Belfield, Dublin 4
19:45	Colm Whelan 12'; Liam Kerrigan 49'; Colm Whelan (penalty missed) 72'	Report	Junior Quitirna 36'; Phoenix Patterson 66' (pen.); Prince Mutswunguma 90+1'	Stadium: UCD Bowl; Referee: Rob Hennessy

17 September 2021	**(1) Finn Harps**	**3–3**	**Dundalk (1)**	Ballybofey, County Donegal
20:00	Tunde Owolabi 25'; Jordan Mustoe (red card) 28'; Seán Boyd 84'; Seán Boyd 90+5'	Report	Patrick Hoban 29' (pen.); Sean Murray 39'; Patrick Hoban 65'	Stadium: Finn Park; Attendance: 1,690; Referee: Damien McGrath

21 September 2021 Replay	**(1) Dundalk**	**3–1** (a.e.t.)	Finn Harps (1)	Dundalk, County Louth
19:45	Sean Murray 39'; Patrick Hoban 97' (pen.); Michael Duffy 105'	Report	Seán Boyd 6'	Stadium: Oriel Park; Referee: Ben Connolly

== Semi-finals ==
The draw for the semi-finals was made on 24 September 2021 at 9:45pm after the league game between Shamrock Rovers and St Patrick's Athletic by former League of Ireland player Conan Byrne live on RTÉ2.

All ties are set to be played the week ending Sunday 22 October 2021.

Teams in bold advanced to the Semi-finals.

Premier Division
- Bohemians
- Dundalk
- St Patrick's Athletic
- Waterford

22 October 2021	**(1) Bohemians**	**1–0**	Waterford (1)	Phibsborough, Dublin 7
19:45	Georgie Kelly (penalty missed) 34'; Dawson Devoy (yellow card) 35'; Georgie Kelly 88'	Report	Niall O'Keeffe (yellow card) 30' (yellow-red card) 90+4'; Kyle Ferguson (yellow card) 41' (yellow-red card) 53'; Prince Mutswunguma (yellow card) 76'	Stadium: Dalymount Park; Attendance: 3,400; Referee: Rob Harvey

22 October 2021	**(1) St Patrick's Athletic**	**3–1**	Dundalk (1)	Inchicore, Dublin 8
19:45	Billy King 26'; Matty Smith 57'; Darragh Burns 86'	Report	Patrick Hoban 41'	Stadium: Richmond Park; Attendance: 5,500; Referee: Neil Doyle

== Final ==
28 November 2021	St Patrick's Athletic	1–1 (a.e.t.) (4–3 p)	Bohemians	Dublin
16:00	Chris Forrester 105+2'		Rory Feely 107'	Stadium: Aviva Stadium; Attendance: 37,126; Referee: Rob Hennessy
	Penalties
	Ronan Coughlan (penalty scored); Billy King (penalty scored); Chris Forrester (penalty missed); Jason McClelland (penalty scored); Robbie Benson (penalty scored)		Dawson Devoy (penalty scored); Conor Levingston (penalty scored); Stephen Mallon (penalty scored); Tyreke Wilson (penalty missed); Keith Ward (penalty missed)
