= 2025 FAI Cup =

Tournament details
- Country: Republic of Ireland
- Dates: 11 May – 9 November 2025
- Teams: 44

Final positions
- Champions: Shamrock Rovers (26th title)
- Runners-up: Cork City

Tournament statistics
- Matches played: 38
- Goals scored: 161 (4.24 per match)
- Top goal scorer(s): Graham Burke (5 goals)
- All statistics correct as of 5 October 2025.

The 2025 FAI Cup, known as the Sports Direct FAI Cup for sponsorship reasons, is the 105th edition of the Republic of Ireland's primary domestic association football cup competition. It features teams from the League of Ireland Premier Division and the First Division, as well as teams from the regional leagues of the Republic of Ireland football league system.

On 15 May 2025, RTÉ announced a broadcast agreement to show a record number of FAI Cup ties over the following two seasons. In the 2025 FAI Cup the deal included the broadcast of one third round fixture, two quarter-final fixtures, both semi-final fixtures, and the final.

The 2025 FAI Cup winners are set to enter the first qualifying round of the 2026–27 UEFA Europa League.

The defending champions, Drogheda United, were beaten in the quarter-finals by Shamrock Rovers.

== Round and dates ==
Round	Draw date	Match dates	Number of fixtures	Teams	New entries this round
First Round	8 April 2025	11–18 May	12	44 → 32	24
Second Round	5 June 2025	18–20 July	16	32 → 16	20
Third Round	22 July 2025	15–17 August	8	16 → 8	None
Quarter-finals	19 August 2025	12–14 September	4	8 → 4	None
Semi-finals	15 September 2025	3–5 October	2	4 → 2	None
Final	—	9 November	1	2 → 1	None

== Teams ==
The 2025 FAI Cup is a knockout competition with 44 teams taking part. The competitors consist of the 20 teams from the League of Ireland and 24 teams from the regional leagues of the Republic of Ireland football league system.

League of Ireland Premier Division clubs
Bohemians	Cork City	Derry City	Drogheda United	Galway United
Shamrock Rovers	Shelbourne	Sligo Rovers	St Patrick's Athletic	Waterford
League of Ireland First Division clubs
Athlone Town	Bray Wanderers	Cobh Ramblers	Dundalk	Finn Harps
Kerry	Longford Town	Treaty United	UCD	Wexford
Provincial league clubs
Baldoyle United (Leinster Senior League)	Bangor Celtic (Leinster Senior League)	Castlebar Celtic (Mayo Association Football League)	College Corinthians (Munster Senior League)	Crumlin United (Leinster Senior League)
Douglas Hall (Munster Senior League)	Fairview Rangers (Limerick & District League)	Fanad United (Donegal Junior League)	Janesboro (Limerick & District League)	Killester Donnycarney (Leinster Senior League)
Leicester Celtic (Leinster Senior League)	Liffey Wanderers (Leinster Senior League)	Lucan United (Leinster Senior League)	Midleton (Munster Senior League)	North End United (Wexford Football League)
Ringmahon Rangers (Munster Senior League)	River Valley Rangers (Leinster Senior League)	Salthill Devon (Galway & District League)	St Mochta's (Leinster Senior League)	St Michael's (Tipperary South District League)
Tolka Rovers (Leinster Senior League)	UCC (Munster Senior League)	Usher Celtic (Leinster Senior League)	Wayside Celtic (Leinster Senior League)	

== First round ==
11 May 2025	North End United	1–4	Castlebar Celtic	Wexford Town, County Wexford
14:00	Murphy 55'	Report	Hughes 25'; Edwards 57', 68'; Kelly 84'	Stadium: Hollygrove; Attendance: 57; Referee: Seamus Kelly

15 May 2025	Wayside Celtic	4–0	River Valley Rangers	Kilternan, County Dublin
19:45	Boylan 33'; Kelly 40'; Clucas 58'; Whelan 67' (o.g.)			Stadium: Jackson Park; Referee: Declan Troy

16 May 2025	Crumlin United	4–2	Lucan United	Crumlin, Dublin 12
20:00	Friel 5'; Kavanagh 23', 90+4'; O'Donohoe 51'		Byrne 32'; Kendrick 67'	Stadium: Pearse Park; Referee: Peter Mahoney

17 May 2025	Midleton	0–6	Killester Donnycarney	Midleton, County Cork
14:00			Jones 23'; Bergin 38', 83'; Nolan 63'; Wall 74', 75'	Stadium: Knockgriffin Park; Referee: Darren O'Sullivan

17 May 2025	College Corinthians	1–2	Bangor Celtic	Douglas, County Cork
15:00	Crowley 37'		Lovic 59'; Samson 90+2'	Stadium: Corinthians Park; Referee: Robert O'Leary

17 May 2025	Fairview Rangers	4–0	Baldoyle United	Garryowen, County Limerick
15:00	Vysochan 27', 88' (pen.); Dore 38'; Ahern 89'			Stadium: Singland Park; Referee: Brian Higgins

17 May 2025	Ringmahon Rangers	1–3	UCC	Mahon, County Cork
15:00	Happi 30'		Power 48'; Roberts 83'; O'Brien 86'	Stadium: Ringmahon Park; Referee: Declan Fogarty

17 May 2025	St Mochta's	4–0	Douglas Hall	Clonsilla, Dublin 15
15:30	Atanda 4' (red card) 45+2'; Chambers 30'; Brady 61'; Doherty 65'			Stadium: Porterstown Road; Referee: John McCarthy

18 May 2025	Leicester Celtic	2–1	Fanad United	Rathfarnham, Dublin 14
14:00	Kevin Maguire 30', 59'		Carr 80'	Stadium: Loreto Park; Referee: Robert Redmond

18 May 2025	Salthill Devon	2–1	Liffey Wanderers	Salthill, County Galway
14:00	Molloy 39'; Darcy 47'	Report	Ellis 82'	Stadium: Drom Soccer Park; Referee: Thomas Oates

18 May 2025	Tolka Rovers	3–1	Janesboro	Glasnevin, Dublin 11
14:00	Mashigo 6'; O'Dwyer 39' (o.g.); Baramidze 90+4'		Lynch 63'; O'Dwyer (yellow card) 89' (yellow-red card)	Stadium: Frank Cooke Park; Referee: Jason Ray

18 May 2025	St Michael's	w/o	Usher Celtic	Tipperary Town, County Tipperary
15:00				Stadium: Cooke Park
Note: St Michael's were awarded a walkover.

== Second round ==
18 July 2025	Bray Wanderers	3–0	Wayside Celtic	Bray, County Wicklow
19:45	Kinsella Bishop 42'; P. Murphy 66'; M. Murphy 80' (pen.)	Report		Stadium: Carlisle Grounds; Attendance: 1,186; Referee: Rob Hennessy

18 July 2025	Drogheda United	5–0	Crumlin United	Drogheda, County Louth
19:45	Keeley 44'; Oluwa 48'; Thomas 70' (pen.); Markey 76'; O'Sullivan 85'	Report		Stadium: Sullivan and Lambe Park; Attendance: 2,286; Referee: Oliver Moran

18 July 2025	Dundalk	0–2	Sligo Rovers	Dundalk, County Louth
19:45		Report	McManus 51'; Doyle-Hayes 54'	Stadium: Oriel Park; Attendance: 2,038; Referee: Aaron O'Dowd

18 July 2025	Finn Harps	3–0	UCD	Ballybofey, County Donegal
19:45	Lomboto 30'; Mpongo 52'; McNamee 64'	Report		Stadium: Finn Park; Attendance: 559; Referee: Neil Doyle

18 July 2025	Galway United	2–0	Tolka Rovers	Galway, County Galway
19:45	Walsh 18'; Hurley 74'	Report		Stadium: Eamonn Deacy Park; Attendance: 1,033; Referee: Ryan Maher

18 July 2025	Kerry	2–1 (a.e.t.)	Athlone Town	Tralee, County Kerry
19:45	Adams 90+7'; Amechi 92'	Report	Oyenuga 56'	Stadium: Mounthawk Park; Attendance: 590; Referee: Daryl Carolan

18 July 2025	Killester Donnycarney	0–7	Bohemians	Phibsborough, Dublin 7
19:45		Report	Strods 8', 19'; Whelan 18' (pen.), 37', 63' (pen.), 79'; Brennan 67'	Stadium: Dalymount Park; Attendance: 3,484; Referee: Daniel Murphy
Note: Killester Donnycarney were drawn as the home team but both clubs agreed to switch the venue to Bohemians' Dalymount Park home ground.

18 July 2025	Treaty United	1–5	Derry City	Garryowen, County Limerick
19:45	Devitt 79'	Report	Boyce 59', 74', 85' (pen.); Bannon 71'; Mullen 86'	Stadium: Markets Field; Attendance: 1,215; Referee: Lucas Keating

18 July 2025	Waterford	5–1	St Mochta's	Waterford, County Waterford
19:45	Lonergan 10', 85'; Noonan 35'; Coyle 83'; Amond 87'	Report	Casey 38' (pen.)	Stadium: RSC; Attendance: 1,322; Referee: Glen Geraghty

18 July 2025	Shamrock Rovers	4–0	Wexford	Tallaght, Dublin 24
20:00	Ozhianvuna 8'; Burke 76'; Gaffney 84'; Mandroiu 90'	Report		Stadium: Tallaght Stadium; Attendance: 2,420; Referee: Mark Houlihan

19 July 2025	Cork City	3–0	Leicester Celtic	Turners Cross, County Cork
12:00	Lutz 69' (pen.); Nelson 72'; Curry 88' (o.g.)			Stadium: Turners Cross; Attendance: 893; Referee: Darragh White

19 July 2025	Salthill Devon	1–0	St Michael's	Salthill, County Galway
14:00	Molloy 13'			Stadium: Drom Soccer Park; Attendance: 131; Referee: Declan Toland

19 July 2025	Bangor Celtic	0–2	Cobh Ramblers	Crumlin, Dublin 12
15:00			Bellis 67'; Whelan 87'	Stadium: Pearse Park; Attendance: 150; Referee: Rob Harvey

19 July 2025	Fairview Rangers	0–4	Shelbourne	Garryowen, County Limerick
18:00			Martin 4', 73', 86'; Kelly 24'	Stadium: Singland Park; Attendance: 950; Referee: Marc Lynch

20 July 2025	Castlebar Celtic	3–6	Longford Town	Castlebar, County Mayo
17:00	Cunningham 4'; Hughes 16'; Loftus 39' (pen.)		Murtagh 11', 18', 22'; George 75', 90+4'; Campbell 89'	Stadium: Celtic Park; Referee: Damien MacGraith

20 July 2025	St Patrick's Athletic	8–0	UCC	Inchicore, Dublin 8
18:00	Murphy 19' (o.g.); Kavanagh 40'; Keena 43'; Forrester 45+1', 68'; Kazeem 46'; Mulraney 49'; Carty 51'	Report		Stadium: Richmond Park; Attendance: 1,243; Referee: Alan Patchell

== Third round ==
15 August 2025	Bohemians	0–1	Sligo Rovers	Phibsborough, Dublin 7
19:45		Report	Elding 53'	Stadium: Dalymount Park; Attendance: 4,246; Referee: Kevin O'Sullivan

15 August 2025	Cork City	2–1	Waterford	Turners Cross, County Cork
19:45	M.Murray 3'; Kamara 81'	Report	Lonergan 22'	Stadium: Turners Cross; Attendance: 2,112; Referee: Rob Hennessy

15 August 2025	Finn Harps	3–1	Bray Wanderers	Ballybofey, County Donegal
19:45	Cullen 14'; Hutchison 27'; Mpongo 30' (pen.)	Report	Curtis 8'; O'Neill (red card) 55'	Stadium: Finn Park; Attendance: 707; Referee: Damien Macgraith

15 August 2025	Kerry	2–0	Cobh Ramblers	Tralee, County Kerry
19:45	Brosnan 10'; Adams 64' (pen.)	Report	O'Donovan (red card) 1'; Griffin (yellow card) (yellow-red card) 90'	Stadium: Mounthawk Park; Attendance: 520; Referee: Aaron O'Dowd

15 August 2025	Salthill Devon	0–4	Galway United	Galway, County Galway
19:45		Report	Buckley 11'; Walsh 36'; Hickey 66'; McGuinness 90+1'	Stadium: Eamonn Deacy Park; Attendance: 2,507; Referee: Paul Norton
Note: Salthill Devon were drawn as the home team but both clubs agreed to switch the venue to Galway United's Eamonn Deacy Park home ground.

16 August 2025	Derry City	1–1 (a.e.t.) (0–3 p)	Drogheda United	Derry, County Londonderry
20:00	Duffy 73'; Doherty (red card) 120+2'	Report	Quinn 2'	Stadium: Ryan McBride Brandywell Stadium; Attendance: 2,662; Referee: Robert Harvey
	Penalties
	Stott (penalty missed); Frizzell (penalty missed); Mullen (penalty missed)		Keeley (penalty scored); Oluwa (penalty scored); Lambe (penalty scored)
Note: Broadcast on RTÉ2

17 August 2025	St Patrick's Athletic	2–0	Shelbourne	Inchicore, Dublin 8
17:00	Melia 45+4'; Forrester 53' (pen.)	Report		Stadium: Richmond Park; Attendance: 3,003; Referee: Paul Mclaughlin

17 August 2025	Shamrock Rovers	2–1	Longford Town	Tallaght, Dublin 24
19:00	McGovern 8' (pen.); Burke 84' (pen.)	Report	Ugbesia 25'	Stadium: Tallaght Stadium; Attendance: 1,744; Referee: Alan Patchell

== Quarter Final ==
12 September	Drogheda United	1–1 (a.e.t.) (4–5 p)	Shamrock Rovers	Drogheda, County Louth
19:30	Quinn 90+5'	Report	Burke 23'	Stadium: Sullivan and Lambe Park; Attendance: 2,594; Referee: Neil Doyle
	Penalties
	Keeley (penalty missed); Oluwa (penalty scored); Lambe (penalty scored); Doyle (penalty scored); Quinn (penalty scored); Markey (penalty missed); Kareem (penalty missed)		(penalty scored) McGovern; (penalty scored) Noonan; (penalty scored) Grant; (penalty scored) O'Neill; (penalty scored) McEneff; (penalty missed) Cleary; (penalty scored) Lopes

12 September 2025	Finn Harps	0–3	Cork City	Ballybofey, County Donegal
19:45		Report	McLaughlin 2', 74'; Maguire 11'	Stadium: Finn Park; Attendance: 1,675; Referee: Paul Norton

12 September 2025	Kerry	4–3 (a.e.t.)	Sligo Rovers	Tralee, County Kerry
19:45	Brosnan 65', 90+2'; Adams 77' (pen.); Okwute 117'	Report	Elding 15', 16', 61'	Stadium: Mounthawk Park; Attendance: 1,150; Referee: Kevin O'Sullivan

14 September 2025	St Patrick's Athletic	3–1 (a.e.t.)	Galway United	Inchicore, Dublin 8
18:00	Mulraney 83'; Forrester 105+1'; Garrick 115'	Report	Hurley 90'; Brouder (red card) 105'	Stadium: Richmond Park; Referee: Paul McLaughlin

== Semi-finals ==
3 October 2025
19:30

Cork City	3–0	St Patrick's Athletic
Maguire 9'; McLaughlin 70', 72'	Report

Turners Cross, Turners Cross, County Cork
Attendance: 5,408
Referee: Rob Harvey

5 October 2025
18:00

Shamrock Rovers	6–1	Kerry
Burke 19', 22'; Noonan 45+3', 67'; Watts 50' (pen.); Barrett 90+1'	Report	Adams 56' (pen.)

Tallaght Stadium, Tallaght, Dublin 24
Attendance: 5,438
Referee: Paul McLaughlin

== Final ==
The 2025 FAI Cup final took place on Sunday, 9 November 2025 at the Aviva Stadium, Dublin. Shamrock Rovers entered the final having claimed the League of Ireland Premier Division title while Cork City had finished bottom of the league.

9 November 2025
15:00 UTC

Shamrock Rovers	2–0	Cork City
Gaffney 65', 71'	Report	Nevin (red card) 43'

Aviva Stadium, Dublin 4
Attendance: 35,252
Referee: Paul Norton

== Top goalscorers ==
Rank	Player	Club	Goals
1	(Republic of Ireland) Graham Burke	Shamrock Rovers	5
2	(Wales) Joe Adams	Kerry	4
2	(Republic of Ireland) Evan McLaughlin	Cork City	4
2	(Republic of Ireland) Chris Forrester	St Patrick's Athletic	4
2	(England) Owen Elding	Sligo Rovers	4
2	(Republic of Ireland) Colm Whelan	Bohemians	4
7	(Northern Ireland) Liam Boyce	Derry City	3
7	(Republic of Ireland) Tommy Lonergan	Waterford	3
7	(Republic of Ireland) John Martin	Shelbourne	3
7	(Republic of Ireland) Daragh Murtagh	Longford Town	3
7	(Republic of Ireland) Cian Brosnan	Kerry	3

== See also ==
- 2025 League of Ireland Premier Division
- 2025 League of Ireland First Division
