= Carew Park =

Carew Park may refer to three things in Limerick, Ireland:

- A housing estate in Southill, Limerick
- Carew Park F.C., a soccer club
- Carew Park, the ground used by Carew Park F.C.
