= Des Kennedy =

Des Kennedy may refer to:

- Des Kennedy (Australian footballer, born 1944), played for St Kilda and Sandringham
- Des Kennedy (Australian footballer, born 1950), played for Hawthorn
- Des Kennedy (Irish footballer) (born 1955), played for Limerick F.C., Galway United and Newcastlewest
