= FAI Junior Cup =

- Organiser(s): Football Association of Ireland
- Founded: 1923
- Region: Republic of Ireland
- Current champions: Fairview Rangers A.F.C.
- Most championships: Fairview Rangers (10 titles)
- Broadcaster(s): TG4; Setanta Sports; Irish TV eir Sport
- Website: FAI Junior Cup @ www.fai.ie

The FAI Junior Cup is a cup competition organised by the Football Association of Ireland for amateur junior association football clubs from the Republic of Ireland. The competition also serves as a qualifier for the senior FAI Cup with the eight quarter-finalists all invited to take part in the FAI Cup.

According to the FAI, the Junior Cup is one of the largest national amateur cup competitions in Europe. The 2011–12 competition had 597 clubs participate and the 2012–13 competition saw an estimated 600 clubs enter the cup. The inaugural winners were Brideville. The competition's most successful club is Fairview Rangers of the Limerick & District League who have been winners ten times.

== History ==
=== Early years ===
Originally known as the Free State Junior Cup, the competition's first winners were Brideville who beat Cobh Ramblers in the inaugural 1923–24 final. Brideville and Cobh Ramblers also became the first of several future League of Ireland members to feature in an FAI Junior Cup final. Sligo Rovers, Evergreen United, St Patrick's Athletic, Bray Wanderers, Home Farm, Finn Harps and St Francis all won the cup before joining the national league. Drogheda United were finalists on four occasions but never winners while Athlone Town won the cup twice during the 1930s after dropping out of the League of Ireland. The competition continued to be known as the Free State Junior Cup until at least 1941.

In 2000, the competition had 700 teams enter.

=== Recent finals ===
On 2 June 2013 the FAI Junior Cup final was played at the Aviva Stadium for the first time. It was played before a friendly international between the Republic of Ireland and Georgia. In 2013 Aviva joined Umbro as sponsors of the FAI Junior Cup and as part of the arrangement all the finals since then have been played at the Aviva Stadium. Sheriff Y.C. became the first club to win the cup following a final at the Aviva. The 2014–15 and 2015–16 finals were both played as double headers along with the FAI Intermediate Cup finals.

=== Television coverage ===
TV coverage debuted on TG4 and Setanta Sports in 2014 from the quarter-finals stage. Irish TV replaced TG4 as free-to-air broadcaster in 2015, and all three channels showed coverage in 2016, again from the quarter-finals stage.

In a major change, the 2016–17 season saw coverage begin with the third round in October, running on the newly renamed eir Sport, IrishTV until its closure in March 2017, and TG4 from the quarter-finals stage.

=== FAI Senior Cup ===
The semi-finalists of the Junior Cup have traditionally been invited to play in the preliminary rounds of the FAI Senior Cup. In April 2024, this was officially changed to grant the four semi-finalists automatic qualification into the FAI Cup. The number of clubs increased ahead of the 2025 season, with all 8 quarter-finalists from the FAI Junior Cup now eligible.

In August 2025, the FAI announced that the Junior Cup would move to a calendar season, in line with the League of Ireland and the FAI Senior Cup.

== List of finals ==
Season	Winners	Result	Runner-Up	Venue
2026 (Note: Competition played in calendar season https://www.fai.ie/latest/fai-announces-calendar-season-alignment-major-amateur-cup-competitions/)	Coachford A.F.C. (Cork)	2–1	Evergreen (Kilkenny)	Turners Cross
2024–25	Fairview Rangers	4–1	North End United (Wexford)	Turners Cross
2023–24	Cockhill Celtic	1–1 (Note: Cockhill Celtic won the 2023–24 final 3–1 on penalties.)	Gorey Rangers	Eamonn Deacy Park
2022–23	Newmarket Celtic (Clare)	1–1 (Note: Newmarket Celtic won the 2022–23 final 5–4 on penalties.)	St. Michael's	Jackman Park
2021–22	Villa F.C.	1–0	Pike Rovers	Turners Cross
2020–21	Competition not held due to Coronavirus pandemic			
2019–20	Fairview Rangers	1–0	Usher Celtic (Dublin)	Eamonn Deacy Park
2018–19	St. Michael's	1–0	Sheriff Y.C.	Eamonn Deacy Park
2017–18	North End United (Wexford)	1–1 (Note: North End United won the 2017–18 final 5–4 on penalties.)	Pike Rovers	Aviva Stadium
2016–17	Sheriff Y.C.	2–0	Evergreen (Kilkenny)	Aviva Stadium
2015–16	Sheriff Y.C.	1–0	Pike Rovers	Aviva Stadium
2014–15	Liffey Wanderers	2–1 (a.e.t.)	Sheriff Y.C.	Aviva Stadium
2013–14	St. Michael's	4–0	Ballynanty Rovers (Limerick)	Aviva Stadium
2012–13	Sheriff Y.C.	0–0 (Note: Sheriff Y.C. won the 2012–13 final 5–4 on penalties)	Kilbarrack United	Aviva Stadium
2011–12	Sheriff Y.C.	3–1	Kilbarrack United	Tolka Park
2010–11	Pike Rovers	2–1	St. Michael's	Turners Cross
2009–10	Fairview Rangers	0–0 (Note: Fairview Rangers won the 2009–10 final 5–3 on penalties)	St. Michael's	Turners Cross
2008–09	Ballymun United	2–0	St. Peter's (Athlone)	Tolka Park
2007–08	Carrick United (Tipperary) (Note: Although listed on the FAI Roll of Honour as hailing from Waterford, the official Carrick United A.F.C. website states the club is located in County Tipperary but plays in the Waterford Junior League.)	2–1	Killester United	Waterford RSC
2006–07	Killester United	3–0	St. John Bosco (Dublin)	Dalymount Park
2005–06	Waterford Crystal	1–0	Athenry	Terryland Park
2004–05	Westport United	2–0	Waterford Crystal	Buckley Park
2003–04	Fairview Rangers	3–0	Carrick United (Tipperary)	Waterford RSC
2002–03	Fairview Rangers	2–0	Portmarnock A.F.C.	Tolka Park
2001–02	Fairview Rangers	4–2 (Replay)	St. Michael's	The Fairgreen, Limerick
2001–02	Fairview Rangers	2–2	St. Michael's	Turners Cross
2000–01	Ballymun United	3–0	St. Kevin's Boys	Tolka Park
1999–2000	Portmarnock A.F.C.	2–0	St Michael's	Tolka Park
1998–99	Fairview Rangers	1–0 (Replay)	Ballymun United	Woodfield Park, Birr
1998–99	Fairview Rangers	1–1	Ballymun United	Woodfield Park, Birr
1997–98	Fairview Rangers	2–0	Waterford Crystal	TBD
1996–97	Fairview Rangers		Portmarnock FC	TBD
1995–96	Bohemians (Waterford)		Mungret Regional	TBD
1994–95	Cherry Orchard	0–0 (a.e.t.); 7–6 (pen.) (Replay)	Kilmore United	Tolka Park
1994–95	Cherry Orchard	1.1	Kilmore United	Tolka Park
1993–94	Clonmel Town	5–1	New Ross Celtic (Wexford)	
1992–93	Kinvara Boys		St. Kevin's Boys F.C.	Tolka Park
1991–92	Neilstown Rangers		Rosemount	
1990–91	Cherry Orchard	1.0	Donaghmede Celtic	
1989–90	Cherry Orchard	2–0	Avenue United (Clare)	Dalymount Park
1988–89	Tolka Rovers		Waterford Bohemians	
1987–88	Usher Celtic		Beggsboro	
1986–87	Cherry Orchard	1–0	Temple United (Cork)	Dublin
1985–86	Cherry Orchard	2.0	Usher Celtic	
1984–85	Cherry Orchard	2.1	St. Kevin's Boys F.C.	Tolka Park
1983–84	Beggsboro		Evergreen (Kilkenny)	
1982–83	St Francis	3–1 (R)	Ballynanty Rovers (Limerick)	Jackman Park (R)
1982–83	St Francis	1–1	Ballynanty Rovers (Limerick)	Tolka Park
1981–82	Cherry Orchard	2–0	Diamond Celtic (Dublin)	Tolka Park
1980–81	St Teresa's		Belgrave	
1979–80	East Wall United		Arbour United	
1978–79	St. Patrick's C.Y.M.S.		East Wall United	Tolka Park
1977–78	Inchicore (Note: FAI Yearbook & Diary 1995 lists the team as Inchicore Athletic. Other sources, including the Aviva Stadium website, list the team as Inchicore United)	3.0	Cherry Orchard	
1976–77	Dunleary Celtic		Dingle United	
1975–76	Whitehall Rangers	2–0	Ballynanty Rovers (Limerick)	
1974–75	Dunleary Celtic		Arbour United	
1973–74	St. Michael's	3–1 (a.e.t.)	Tolka Rovers	Tolka Park
1972–73	Tolka Rovers		St. Patrick's C.Y.M.S.	
1971–72	Talbot United (Dublin)	3–1	St. Mary's (Cork)	Tolka Park
1970–71	Hoganville (Dublin)	2–1	Caledonians (Limerick)	
1969–70	Caledonians (Limerick)		Tolka Rovers	
1968–69	St Francis		Talbot United	
1967–68	Finn Harps		Telephones United (Dublin)	
1966–67	Swilly Rovers (Donegal)		Orchard United (Dublin)	
1965–66	East Wall United (Dublin)	3–2	Everton (Cork)	Dalymount Park
1964–65	Fairview Rangers	3–0 (R)	Douglas (Cork)	Markets Field (R)
1964–65	Fairview Rangers	1–1	Douglas (Cork)	Turners Cross
1963–64	East Wall United (Dublin)		Swilly Rovers (Donegal)	TBC
1962–63	T.E.K. United	3–1	Blackrock (Cork)	Dalymount Park
1961–62	Swilly Rovers (Donegal)	3–1	Castleview (Cork)	Dalymount Park
1960–61	Valley United		Hibernians (Waterford)	
1959–60	Pearse Rangers (Dublin)		Hibernians (Waterford)	
1958–59	St Saviours		Glenmore Celtic	
1957–58	Virginians		Swilly Rovers (Donegal)	
1956–57	Belgrove F.C. (Dublin)		Virginians	TBC
1955–56	Grange United		Bohemians (Waterford)	
1954–55	Home Farm		Belgrove	
1953–54	Bray Wanderers	1–0	Ierne	Dalymount Park
1952–53	Evergreen (Waterford)	3–1	Swilly Rovers (Donegal)	Dalymount Park
1951–52	Rathfarnham		Bohemians (Waterford)	
1950–51	Bray Wanderers	2–1	Drogheda United	Dalymount Park
1949–50	Griffith Rangers		Irish Raleigh	
1948–49	Rathfarnham		Caledonians (Limerick)	
1947–48	St Paul's (Cork)		Pike Rovers	
1946–47	Hibernians (Waterford)		Iona C.Y.M.S. (Dublin)	
1945–46	St. Patrick's C.Y.M.S.		Rathfarnham	
1944–45	Rockville (Cork)		Wembley Rovers (Limerick)	
1943–44	Coastal Defence (Cork)		Drogheda United	
1942–43	No competition			
1941–42	Distillery B (Dublin)		Drogheda United	
1940–41	St Patrick's Athletic		Galway Bohemians	
1939–40	Drumcondra Juniors		Drogheda United	
1938–39	Drumcondra Juniors	4-0	Killybegs (Donegal)	Dalymount Park
1937–38	Athlone Town	2–0	Bendigo United (Dublin)	Tolka Park
1936–37	Amiens Celtic		St. Patrick's (Dundalk)	
1935–36	Evergreen United	2-1	Shelbourne	Dalymount Park
1934–35	Athlone Town	3–0	Evergreen United	Dalymount Park
1933–34	B&I	2–1	Cobh Wanderers	Dalymount Park
1932–33	Queen's Park	1–0	Amiens Celtic	Rutland Avenue
1931–32	Clontarf Corinthians	2–1	Southern Rovers	Dalymount Park
1930–31	Distillery (Dublin)	1–0	Southern Rovers	Harold's Cross
1929–30	Rossville	2–0	Bohemians "C"	Dalymount Park
1928–29	Sligo Rovers	3–0	Grangegorman	The Showgrounds (Sligo)
1927–28	Richmond United	3–0	Cahir Unknowns	Tolka Park
1926–27	Richmond United	4–1	Bohemians "C"	Dalymount Park
1925–26	Brunswick	1–0	St. Vincents (Cork)	Victoria Cross, Cork
1924–25	St. Mary's United	3–2	Sligo Celtic	St James' Park
1923–24	Brideville	1–0	Cobh Ramblers	Victoria Cross, Cork
