= Al Finucane =

Irish football player

Personal information
- Full name: Michael Alphonsus Finucane
- Date of birth: 8 January 1943 (age 83)
- Place of birth: Limerick, Ireland
- Position: Defender

Senior career*
Years	Team	Apps	(Gls)
1960–1973	Limerick	253	(23)
1973–1981	Waterford	218	(11)
1981–1986	Limerick	126	(3)
1986–1987	Waterford United	21	(0)
1987–1988	Newcastlewest	23	(0)
Total		641	(37)

International career
	League of Ireland XI	26	
1966	Republic of Ireland U23	1	(0)
1967–1971	Republic of Ireland	11	(0)
- * Club domestic league appearances and goals

Michael Alphonsus Finucane (born 8 January 1943) is an Irish former footballer who played as a defender. During his 28-year career he played for Limerick, Waterford and Newcastlewest, making a total of 634 League of Ireland appearances — the highest in the league's history. In addition, Finucane represented the Republic of Ireland at international level.

He won the FAI Cup three times; twice with Limerick (1971, 1982) and once with Waterford (1980). In 27 seasons playing League of Ireland football, Finucane was never sent off.

== Club career ==
Michael Alphonsus Finucane was born in 1943. A native of Limerick, Finucane is from Quins Cottages in Rosbrien. He started playing football with Reds United when he was eight and played at Under-13 level in the local schoolboy leagues. He joined Limerick as a 17-year-old under manager Ewan Fenton.

=== Limerick F.C. (1960–1973) ===
Finucane played his first game for Limerick F.C. as a 17-year-old in 1960. His debut came on 4 December against Shamrock Rovers in Milltown, with the match ending in a 2–2 draw. Finucane played regularly for the reserve side until August 1961 when he again played for the senior team during Limerick's Shield campaign. Initially played at inside-left, Finucane scored eight goals in the 1961–62 season. He would later change position to centre-half, where he established himself as a ball-playing defender.

He has the distinction of scoring the first ever goal in a competitive game at Flower Lodge. In 1965, he played against CSKA Sofia in Europe. He was part of the Limerick side that lost successive FAI Cup finals to Shamrock Rovers in 1965 and 1966. Finucane was awarded Personality of the Year by the Sports Writers' Association of Ireland for 1966–67 and won his first international call up the same season.

By the mid-1960s offers from cross-Channel clubs were pouring in. Everton came over to see the Limerick half-back in action in Milltown, Jock Stein arrived from Glasgow Celtic and there were scouting missions from Swindon Town and Millwall. Serious offers followed but after talks between the player and his Limerick manager, the decision was made to remain in Limerick.

Finucane captained Limerick to their first FAI Cup final win, a 3–0 replay victory over Drogheda F.C. at Dalymount Park in April 1971. He continued to play for the club until 1973, making over 250 league appearances.

=== Waterford F.C. (1973–1981) ===
Finucane moved to Waterford F.C. in the 1973–74 season. During his time at Waterford, Finucane shared the dressing room with former England captain and World Cup winner Bobby Charlton, who Finucane described as "a big hero of mine". Finucane later captained the Waterford team that won the 1980 FAI Cup. He scored in the opening game of their cup campaign, a 5–1 victory over Thurles Town, and was part of a back-four that kept a clean sheet against Cork United in the second round. In the following round, Waterford beat the recent winners of the League Cup, Athlone Town, to setup a semi-final tie against Finucane's old team, now known as Limerick United. The first game against Limerick ended in a 1–1 draw but Waterford won the replay 3–2.

Winning the FAI Cup qualified Waterford for the 1980–81 European Cup Winners' Cup. They were drawn against Hibernians F.C. of Malta in the first round and 37 year-old Finucane scored in a 4–0 win to send Waterford through 4–1 on aggregate.

Finucane remained with Waterford until 1981, when he returned to Limerick.

=== Return to Limerick (1981–1986) ===
Finucane returned to his former club, who had changed their name to Limerick United in his absence, for the start of the 1981–82 season. In his first season back with Limerick, he was made captain. He went on to lead Limerick to the final of the 1982 FAI Cup where they beat Bohemians. He also started in Limerick's 1982–83 European Cup Winners Cup game against AZ Alkmaar in Markets Field, where the home side drew 1–1 with their Dutch opponents.

Finucane remained at the club during the 1983–84 season, when financial and off-the-field issues resulted in the club changing their kit colours and their name from Limerick United to Limerick City. On 31 October, Finucane started in the club's Munster Senior Cup victory over Cobh Ramblers.

In January 1985, Finucane won his first Player of the Month award. He played one final season for Limerick before he was released at the end of the 1985–86 season at the age of 42.

=== Later career ===
Finucane signed for a second stint with Waterford F.C., who were now renamed Waterford United, in 1986. Managed by his former Waterford teammate, Alfie Hale, Waterford United had been beaten finalists in the FAI Cup the previous season but still qualified for the European Cup Winners Cup after Shamrock Rovers completed the league and cup double. Therefore, in September 1986 and 21 years after his European debut for Limerick, Finucane lined out for Waterford United in a first round UEFA Cup Winners Cup match against Bordeaux. At 43 years and 261 days old, this appearance meant Finucane became the oldest player to compete in a UEFA European club competition, beating the previous record held by Dino Zoff. As of 2023, he remains the oldest player who ever played in any European club competition.

Finucane finished his career with Limerick side, Newcastle West. Finucane's final appearance in senior football was on 10 April 1988 for Newcastle West in their First Division tie against UCD at Ballygowan Park. UCD were unable to prevent Finucane finishing his career with a clean sheet and the match ended 0–0. He retired from football in April 1988. His final game brought Finucane's total number of league appearances to 634 (376 with Limerick, 237 with Waterford and 21 with Newcastlewest) which, as of 2025, set the record for the most appearances made by any player in the League of Ireland. Despite a playing career that lasted 27 seasons, Finucane was never sent off and only received 3 yellow cards.

== International career ==
Finucane made his debut for the Republic of Ireland against Turkey, along with Joe Kinnear, on 22 February 1967. Finucane won 11 caps for Ireland and captained the team away to Austria on 10 October 1971. He played in the first ever Republic of Ireland U23 game in 1966 and played in un-capped internationals against West Germany's Olympic team and Australia.

== Personal life ==
Finucane comes from a family with a strong association with football. His uncle is John Neilan, who played full back for Limerick in the 1950s. His son, Alan, played with Pike Rovers in the Limerick & District League as did his nephew, Paul Finucane, who went on to play for Limerick F.C. as a centre-back.

Outside of football, Finucane spent time working as a tailor's cutter and also ran his own shop. He later went into sales, working for Kerry Co-Op and Estuary Oil. He retired in 2006. Finucane enjoys playing golf and is a fan of Liverpool F.C.

Finucane's younger brother Tony played as a goalkeeper for Waterford United in the 1970s.

== Honours ==
=== Club ===
- FAI Cup: 3
  - Limerick F.C. 1971, 1982
  - Waterford F.C.: 1980
- FAI League Cup
  - Waterford F.C.: 1973–74
- Dublin City Cup
  - Limerick F.C. 1969–70

=== Individual ===
- PFAI Merit Award: 2018
- SWAI Personality of the Year: 1967
- FAI Football Legend
  - 2007
