= Association football records and statistics in the Republic of Ireland =

This page details football records in the Republic of Ireland. Unless otherwise stated, records are taken from the Premier Division, the top level of the League of Ireland.

== League ==
=== Team records ===
==== Titles ====
- Most top-flight league titles: 22, Shamrock Rovers (Premier Division)
- Most consecutive league titles: 4,
  - Shamrock Rovers (1983–84 to 1986–87 and 2020 to 2023)
- Most second tier league titles: 5, Drogheda United (First Division)
- Biggest title-winning margin: 19 points, 2008; Bohemian F.C. (85 points) over St Patrick's Athletic (66 points)

==== Points records ====
- Most points in a season (any division): 94, Galway United (2023)
- Most points in a season (top-flight):
  - 36 games: 87, Dundalk (2018)
  - 33 games: 85, Bohemians (2008)

==== Wins ====
- Most consecutive top-flight league wins: 15, Bohemians (1923–24, from 18 games)

==== Games without defeat ====
- Most consecutive top-flight games without defeat: 33 games, Shamrock Rovers (5 October 2019 to 21 May 2021)

Appearances

- Most consecutive appearances in the top-flight: 106, Bohemians (1921–present)
- Most appearances in the top-flight: 106, Bohemians (93, as of 2013)

==== Goals records ====
- Most goals in a season (any division): 98, Galway United (2023)
- Most goals in a season (Premier Division): 85, Dundalk (2018)

==== Transfers ====
- Highest transfer fee received: €1.8 million
  - Mason Melia, from St Patrick's Athletic to Tottenham Hotspur (4 February 2025)
- Highest transfer fee paid: €104,000
  - Odhrán Casey, from Cliftonville to Shelbourne (14 January 2026)

==== Runs ====
- Featuring in European Football in consecutive seasons: 12, Shelbourne FC, Shamrock Rovers
- Unbeaten seasons: 2, Shamrock Rovers

=== Individual records ===
==== Goals ====
- Most career league goals: 235, Brendan Bradley
- Most career top-flight goals: 231, Brendan Bradley
- Most goals in a season:
  - 22 games: 37, Jimmy Turnbull
- Fastest goal: 7 seconds — Peter Hutton (for Derry City against Shamrock Rovers, 2002)
- Fastest hat-trick (time between first and third goals): 2 minutes 13 seconds — Jimmy O'Connor (for Shelbourne against Bohemians, 19 November 1967)

==== Most deliveries in a season ====
Kieran Sadlier 117 Cork City 2017

==== Appearances ====
- Most appearances: 634, Al Finucane

== FAI Cup ==
=== Team records ===
==== Finals ====
- Most cup final wins: 26, Shamrock Rovers
- Most cup final losses: 12, Shelbourne
- Most cup final appearances: 37, Shamrock Rovers
- Most consecutive cup final wins: 6, Shamrock Rovers (1964, 1965, 1966, 1967, 1968, 1969)
- Most cup final appearances without winning: 3, Evergreen United / Cork Celtic (1953, 1964, 1969)
- Highest scoring cup final: 7 goals, joint record:
  - Bohemians 4–3 Dundalk (1935)
  - Derry City 4–3 St. Patrick's Athletic (2006)[a.e.t.]

==== All rounds ====
- Largest winning margin: Dundalk 11–0 Athlone Town (Semi-final, 2020)

== League Cup ==
=== Team records ===
==== Finals ====
- Most league cup final wins: 11, Derry City
- Most league cup final losses: 8, Shamrock Rovers
- Most league cup final appearances: 14, Derry City
- Most league cup final appearances without winning: 3, Finn Harps (1974, 1975, 1985)

== Total titles won ==
As of 8 November 2026

Team	Domestic									Ireland	Total
Team	League of Ireland	FAI Cup	League of Ireland Cup	League of Ireland Shield	President of Ireland's Cup	FAI Super Cup	Top Four Cup	LFA President's Cup	Dublin City Cup	All-Ireland titles (Note: Northern Ireland Football League; Irish Cup; Champions Cup; Top Four Cup (Northern Ireland); Setanta Sports Cup; Dublin and Belfast Inter-City Cup; Blaxnit Cup; Texaco Cup; Tyler Cup; Irish News Cup; Gold Cup; City Cup)	Total
Shamrock Rovers	23	26	2	18	2	1	3	22	10	8	115
Dundalk	14	12	7	2	3	-	2	9	5	2	56
Shelbourne	14	7	1	8	1	1	1	8	4	5	50
Bohemians	11	7	3	6	-	-	1	13	1	3	45
Derry City	2	7	11	-	2	-	-	-	-	9	31
Drumcondra	5	5	-	4	-	-	3	7	6	-	30
St Patrick's Athletic	8	5	4	1	1	1	-	6	3	-	29
Waterford	6	2	2	5	-	-	5	1	-	1	22
Cork City	3	4	3	-	3	-	-	-	-	1	14
Sligo Rovers	3	5	2	-	-	-	-	-	1	1	12
Cork United	5	2	-	2	-	-	-	-	2	-	11
Limerick	2	2	3	2	-	-	-	-	2	-	11
Cork Hibernians	1	2	-	2	-	-	-	-	3	1	9
Athlone Town	2	1	3	-	-	-	-	1	-	1	8
St James's Gate	2	2	-	2	-	-	-	-	1	-	7
Drogheda United	1	2	2	-	-	-	-	-	-	2	7
Cork Celtic	1	-	-	1	-	-	4	-	1	-	7
Cork Athletic	2	2	-	-	-	-	-	-	-	-	4
Longford Town	-	2	1	-	-	-	-	-	-	-	3
Galway United	-	1	2	-	-	-	-	-	-	-	3
Finn Harps	-	1	-	-	-	-	-	-	1	1	3
Dolphin	1	-	-	-	-	-	-	-	1	-	2
Bray Wanderers	-	2	-	-	-	-	-	-	-	-	2
Cork	-	2	-	-	-	-	-	-	-	-	2
UCD	-	1	-	-	-	1	-	-	-	-	2
Alton United	-	1	-	-	-	-	-	-	-	-	1
Home Farm	-	1	-	-	-	-	-	-	-	-	1
Sporting Fingal	-	1	-	-	-	-	-	-	-	-	1
Transport	-	1	-	-	-	-	-	-	-	-	1

- Gold - current winners of competition (where still active).

== See also ==
- List of football clubs by competitive honours won
- List of League of Ireland top scorers
- Football records and statistics in Northern Ireland
