= Johnny Walsh (footballer, born 1957) =

Irish footballer

Johnny "Jabber" Walsh (born 8 November 1957) is an Irish former footballer who played as a midfielder.

He made his one and only appearance for the Republic of Ireland national team on 30 May 1982 in a 2–1 defeat to Trinidad and Tobago in Port of Spain. Walsh scored the opening goal in a 2–1 win for the League of Ireland XI against the Scottish Football League XI on St Patrick's Day 1980.

At club level, he played for many years on the successful Limerick F.C. teams of the 1980s. Walsh made his League of Ireland debut on 3 October 1976. He won a league title with the club in 1980 and an FAI Cup medal in 1982.

== Honours ==
Limerick United

- League of Ireland: 1979–80
- FAI Cup: 1982
