= Tim Cuneen =

Irish footballer

Tim Cuneen (1 February 1924 – 31 March 2011) was an Irish footballer who played as a midfielder.

He made his only appearance for the Republic of Ireland national team on 16 November 1952, in a 3–2 win over Norway at the Ullevaal Stadion in Oslo. He was substituted before half time with injury in the game and his replacement Paddy Coad scored, becoming the first ever substitute to score for Ireland.

Before he had celebrated his 15th birthday, Cuneen had turned out for his local League of Ireland club Limerick F.C. He joined Coleraine F.C. during the 1950–51 season but returned to his home town within weeks and played for both Pike Rovers and Limerick F.C. His display for the League of Ireland XI against the Football League XI in April 1951 contributed to his winning full international honours.
