= Kevin Fitzpatrick (Irish footballer) =

Irish former footballer

Kevin Fitzpatrick (born 1942) is an Irish former footballer. Kevin played 22 seasons for a club called Limerick United from 1959-1982. Kevin also managed to get one Senior Ireland cap against Czechoslovakia. Kevin played against many European clubs including Real Madrid, Southampton, Torino, FC Young Boys and FCSB + many more.

== Career ==
A goalkeeper, Fitzpatrick made his one and only appearance for the Republic of Ireland national football team on 7 October 1969 in a World Cup qualifying game against Czechoslovakia. Played in Prague, the match ended in a 3–0 defeat of the Irish team.

He played 22 seasons with Limerick F.C., starting in 1959. He played his 675th game for Limerick in a clash with Shamrock Rovers in January 1978.

In his final game, Brendan Storan's goal defeated Bohemians in the 1982 FAI Cup final at Dalymount Park.

== Honours ==
Limerick

- League of Ireland (1): 1979–80
- FAI Cup (2): 1971, 1982
- League of Ireland Cup (1): 1976-77
- Munster Senior Cup (2): 1963, 1977
