= Jackman Park =

Football ground in Limerick, Ireland

- De Jacks
- Interactive map of Jackman Park
- Full name: Jackman Park
- Former names: Priory Park
- Location: Carey's Road, Limerick, Ireland
- Coordinates: 52°39′28.01″N 08°37′20.19″W
- Owner: Limerick District Management Committee (LDMC)
- Operator: LDMC
- Capacity: 2,450 (261 seated)
- Surface: Grass
- Scoreboard: Yes
- Public transit: Limerick Colbert railway station

Construction
- Opened: 1973 (for association football)
- Renovated: 1989

Tenants
- Limerick & District League; Former; Limerick F.C. (2007–2012); Treaty United W.F.C. (2021)

Jackman Park is a football ground in Limerick, Ireland. Owned by the Limerick & District League, the ground is located on the Lower Carey's Road near Limerick Colbert railway station. It was home to Limerick F.C. and is regularly used for various matches in Limerick, from schoolboy to women's international games. The ground's total capacity is 2,450 with a single 261-seat stand on the site of the former shed.

Crescent College owned the ground in the 1970s before moving out to Crescent College Comprehensive. During their ownership, Old Crescent RFC played there. It was known as Priory Park during this time. The ground is located on Carey's Road and opened as an association football venue in 1973. Floodlights were installed in 1989. West Ham United and Celtic have played at the venue in friendlies. The ground also has an electronic scoreboard.

The ground was home to Limerick F.C. from 2007 to 2012. During this period, Limerick F.C. (known at the time as Limerick 37) announced plans to build a seated stand at the Colbert Station side of the ground. However, in 2008, the Limerick board announced their intentions to relocate the club to the Markets Field, the club's former home. At the start of the 2013 season, Limerick F.C. moved to Thomond Park, pending a planned return to Markets Field.

In 2021, Treaty United W.F.C. switched their home ground for Women's National League matches from Market's Field to Jackman Park. They returned to Market's Field in 2022.
