= St. Michael's A.F.C. =

- Full name: Saint Michael's Association Football Club
- Nicknames: The Saints; Super Saints
- Founded: 1947
- Ground: Cooke Park
- League: Tipperary Southern & District League
Home colours	Away colours

St. Michael's Association Football Club is an association football club, based in Tipperary Town, Ireland. The club, which was founded in 1947, plays in the Tipperary Southern & District League (TSDL). Known colloquially as the Saints, the club's most prominent success came in 1974, when St. Michael's won the FAI Junior Cup, a feat repeated by the club in 2013–14 and again in 2018–19. The club's home ground of Cooke Park is located in Tipperary Town.

== History ==
Since the early 1900s, Tipperary Town was a hotbed of footballing activity, with several teams operating in the town and its environs. Most notable among these was Tipperary Wanderers, who beat Shamrock Rovers 1–0 in the inaugural Irish Free State Cup (became FAI Cup in 1937) in December 1921. The tie was a qualifying round for the first-round proper, as Rovers were a non-league club at the time. The game had to be replayed as Rovers objected to the ground conditions and a dipped crossbar in one of the goals. Rovers won the second game 1–0, courtesy of a penalty kick scored by a young player who went on to become a League of Ireland legend, Bob Fullam. This turn of events proved all the more heartbreaking for Wanderers as Rovers progressed to the final, only losing out to St. James' Gate after a replay.

Tipperary United were also a well established club of the era, and enjoyed significant success up to the wartime period.

In 1947, a group of locals established St. Michael's after receiving an invite to a challenge match from a club in Limerick. The club obtained their first trophy by winning the North Munster League in 1948–49.

St. Michael's won the Munster Junior Cup for the first time in 1973. Captained by Mick Flynn, they beat Johnville of Waterford in the final. They followed up that victory with the FAI Junior Cup in 1974. The club beat Dublin side Tolka Rovers 2–1 at Tolka Park to claim the national junior title.

In the 2013–14 season, the Tipperary club won every trophy on offer, including the league and the Munster Junior Cup. St. Michael's qualified for the first round of the 2019 FAI Cup, losing to Glengad United on penalties. The club qualified again in 2023, this time losing to Waterford F.C.

== Home ground ==
From the inception of the club until 1985, St. Michael’s home pitch was the showgrounds at the rear of St. Michael’s Church in Tipperary Town.

In order to facilitate the construction of the Canon Hayes Recreation Centre on the church grounds, the club moved to the nearby Cooke Park, signing a 99-year lease in 1985. The centre's running track and playing pitch was built on the site of the old St Michael’s pitch, and is used by the club's schoolboy and reserve teams.

The venue hosted one match at the 1994 UEFA European Under-16 Championship, a group game where Germany defeated Switzerland 5–1.

Cooke Park is widely recognised as one of the best junior grounds in Ireland, and has hosted three FAI Junior Cup finals, four Munster Junior Cup Finals, three FAI Youth Cup finals, three Munster Youth Cup finals, UEFA European U.16 championship internationals, Junior and Amateur internationals, Lawyers World Cup and many local TSDL finals.

The Cooke Park facilities were used as a training base for the local special needs athletes for the Special Olympics, in 2003.

In 2005, the club installed a floodlit all-weather facility, and UEFA standard floodlighting on the Cooke Park pitch.

In August 2009, the Republic of Ireland senior international squad used Cooke Park for a training camp, in preparation for their friendly international games against Australia (12 August) and South Africa (8 September) in Thomond Park, Limerick.

== Honours ==
To date the club have won honours at local, provincial and national level. These honours include the FAI Junior Cup, Munster Junior Cup, FAI Youth Cup, FAI U.17 Cup, MFA Youth Cup, Tipperary League and Cup at Junior and Youth level, the AOH Cup, and the Cork AUL League.

== FAI Junior Cup ==
St. Michael's claimed the biggest prize in Irish junior football for the first time in 1974, beating Tolka Rovers (Dublin) 2–1 in the final. For thirty years the club was the last club outside of Dublin to have won the trophy. The capital's monopoly on the competition was finally broken, ironically, by local Tipperary rivals, Clonmel Town in 1994, a game which was played in Cooke Park beating New Ross Celtic in the final.

The club appeared in a final of the competition for the second time in the 1999–2000 season, losing 2–0 to a strong Portmarnock side, in Tolka Park, Dublin.

Two years later, St. Michael's were competing in another Junior Cup final, against Fairview Rangers of Limerick. The venue on this occasion was Turner's Cross in Cork. A late St. Michael's equaliser saw the game end in a 1–1 draw. Fairview won home advantage for the replay on the toss of a coin and emerged as 4-2 victors, having come from two goals down.

In May 2014, St. Michael's won their second FAI Junior Cup after a 4–0 win against Ballynanty Rovers at the Aviva Stadium with goals from David Slattery, Pat Quinn and two from Jimmy Carr. St. Michael's qualified for the 2014 FAI Cup by reaching the semi-finals of the 2014 FAI Junior Cup.

== Capped players ==
James Walsh, who earned his 50th cap in January 2009, is the current captain of the junior international side, a role he has filled for several years.

Another former player, Shane Long, is currently starring for Premier League team Southampton and has been capped at senior international level. When earning his second cap as a substitute against Slovakia on 28 March 2007, he became the first person to play both hurling and international football at Croke Park, having been part of the Tipperary team for the All-Ireland Minor semi-finals in 2003 and 2004. He was nominated for the Football Association of Ireland Young Player of the Year Award for 2007.

== Alumni ==
John Delaney, former CEO of the Football Association of Ireland, is a former player and honorary life president.

== Roll of Honour ==
- North Munster League & Smyth Cup: 1948
- Munster Junior Cup: 1973, 1990, 1991, 2001, 2005, 2011, 2014, 2016, 2019, 2024
- FAI Junior Cup: 1974, 2014, 2019
- FAI Junior Runners Up: 2000, 2002, 2010, 2011, 2023
- FAI Youth Cup: 1994, 1995
- Munster Youth Cup: 1990–91, 1991–92, 1994–1995
- Tipperary Premier League Champions: 19 times
- Tipperary Cup: 4 times
- Tipperary Youth League: 12 times
- Tipperary Youth Cup: 8 times
- Tipperary Third Division (B team): 1992
- Paddy Purtill Cup: 2004
