= Pike Rovers F.C. =

- Full name: Pike Rovers Football Club
- Nickname: The Hoops
- Founded: 1938
- Ground: Pike Rovers Complex; Crossagalla
- Capacity: 1,000
- League: Limerick & District League; Munster Senior League
Home colours	Away colours

Pike Rovers Football Club is an Irish association football club based in Southill, Limerick. The club plays at Crossagalla and their senior men's team competes in the Limerick & District League. They have previously played in the Munster Senior League. During their history Pike Rovers have also entered teams in the FAI Cup, the FAI Intermediate Cup, the FAI Junior Cup and the FAI Youth Cup. They have been finalists in the latter three cup competitions.

== History ==
Pike Rovers F.C. was founded in 1938 in the Mulgrave Street/Blackboy Pike district of Limerick. The club colours are a variation of green and white hooped shirts, green or white shorts and green or white socks and were initially inspired by the colours of Celtic F.C. In 1950 they became the first association football club from County Limerick to win a national trophy when they won the 1949–50 FAI Youth Cup.

In 2013, the club qualified for the FAI Cup and made it to the second round of the competition.

In 2024, the club qualified for the third round of the FAI Cup before being knocked out by fellow Limerick team, Treaty United.

== Notable former players ==
=== Internationals ===
Republic of Ireland internationals

- (Republic of Ireland) Tim Cuneen
- (Republic of Ireland) Joe Waters

Republic of Ireland U19 internationals

- (Republic of Ireland) Shadrach Ogie

== Honours ==
- Munster Senior League
  - Winners: 1951–52: 1
  - Runners-up: 1952–53: 1
- FAI Intermediate Cup
  - Runners-up: 1950-51: 1
- FAI Junior Cup
  - Winners: 2010–11 : 1
  - Runners-up: 1947–48, 2015–16: 2
- FAI Youth Cup
  - Winners: 1949–50 : 1
  - Runners-up: 1955-56: 1
