= Des Kennedy (Australian footballer, born 1950) =

Australian rules footballer

Personal information
- Full name: Des Kennedy
- Born: 1 September 1950 (age 76)
- Original team: Trinity Grammar
- Height: 185 cm (6 ft 1 in)
- Weight: 80 kg (176 lb)

Playing career^{1}
Years	Club	Games (Goals)
1970	Hawthorn	4 (2)
- ^{1} Playing statistics correct to the end of 1970.

Des Kennedy (born 1 September 1950) is a former Australian rules footballer who played with Hawthorn in the Victorian Football League (VFL).
