= Des Kennedy (Irish footballer) =

Irish footballer

Personal information
- Full name: Desmond Kennedy
- Date of birth: September 1954 (age 72)
- Place of birth: Limerick, Ireland
- Position: Striker

Senior career*
Years	Team	Apps	(Gls)
1972–1978	Limerick	130	(45)
1978–1979	Galway United	26	(9)
1979–1987	Limerick	171	(59)
1987–1989	Newcastlewest		

International career
1986	League of Ireland XI	2	(0)
- * Club domestic league appearances and goals

Des Kennedy (born July 1955) was an Irish footballer. During his career he played for League of Ireland sides Limerick, Galway United and Newcastlewest.

Kennedy is most notable for the two goals that he scored against European football powerhouse Real Madrid during the 1980–81 European Cup while playing for Limerick. Real Madrid conceded only four goals in their European Cup campaign which resulted in defeat to Liverpool in the final.

He signed for Limerick from Janesboro United and also had a brief contract in the mid-1970s with Galway United. He ended his League of Ireland career with NewcastleWest F.C.

At the end of the 2012 League of Ireland season, Kennedy became joint-ranked twenty seventh in the all-time League of Ireland goal-scoring list with 117 league goals
