= Carew Park F.C. =

Association football club, Limerick, Ireland

- Full name: Carew Park Football Club
- Ground: Carew Park, Limerick
- Coordinates: 52.6424°N 8.6181°W
- League: Limerick & District League
Home colours

Carew Park F.C. is an amateur football club from Roxboro, Limerick City in Ireland. The club plays at Carew Park and fields teams in the Limerick & District League.

The club colours are yellow shirts, blue shorts and blue socks.

Carew Park qualified for the FAI Cup in 2005, making it to the second round. The club qualified for the 2013 FAI Cup, but did not make it past the first round.
