= Fairview Rangers A.F.C. =

Association football club in Limerick

Fairview Rangers
- Full name: Fairview Rangers Association Football Club
- Nickname: The 'View
- Founded: 1946
- Ground: Singland Park, Limerick
- League: Limerick & District League
Home colours

Fairview Rangers Association Football Club are an Irish association football club from Singland, Limerick. The club's senior men's team competes in the Limerick & District League.

Fairview Rangers have won the FAI Junior Cup a record 10 times, a feat which has seen them qualify for the senior competition; the FAI Cup. The club play their home games at Singland Park, also known as 'the Fairgreen'.

== History ==
Fairview Rangers were founded in 1946. Their first game against Tavern United ended in a 1–1 draw. The club initially played in a black and white quartered jersey until 1961 when the current blue and gold colours were adopted. They won the FAI Junior Cup for the first time in 1964–65, with a replay victory over Douglas from Cork.

The 1990s saw the club enjoy one of their most successful periods, beginning the decade with four Limerick & District League titles in a row and winning eight league titles in total. Fairview also won three consecutive FAI Junior Cups from 1997 to 1999. The club finished the decade on a high when their cup win in 1999 secured the club a place in the FAI Cup for the first time.

After qualifying for the 2000 FAI Cup, Fairview drew the holders, Bray Wanderers, in the third round, the first time the holders of the FAI Senior and Junior Cups had met in the competition. In the Junior Cup, Fairview managed to repeat their feat from the 1990s with another three in a row from 2002 to 2004. The curtailed 2002 FAI Cup saw Fairview beat Dublin City in the second round, with a 4–1 victory over the League of Ireland side. This result qualified them for the last sixteen of the competition, where they lost 0–2 to Finn Harps. The club qualified for the FAI Cup again in 2003 and 2004 but lost out to Moyle Park College and Wayside Celtic respectively.

The club became the first team to win the FAI Junior Cup nine times in 2020, with a 1–0 win over Usher Celtic. After qualifying for the 2021 FAI Cup, Fairview beat Athenry F.C. on penalties to reach the first round where they hosted League of Ireland Premier Division side Finn Harps. Later that year, the club won the All-Ireland Junior President's Cup, beating Belfast opponents Willowbank F.C. on penalties.

In 2025, Fairview extended their Junior Cup titles record, as well as their 100% win record in Junior Cup finals, with a 4–1 win over Wexford team, North End United. Winning the FAI Junior Cup qualified Fairview for the 2025 FAI Cup, where they were drawn against Baldoyle United. The club made it to the second round before losing to Shelbourne. They also saw further success in the Limerick District League, winning the 2024–25 title; their first in 22 years. They proceeded to secure the cross-border Presidents' Junior Cup for a second time with a 1–0 victory over Ardmore.

== Honours ==
Fairview Rangers F.C. honours
| Honour | No. | Years |
|---|---|---|
| Limerick & District League Premier Division | 15 | 1969–70, 1973–74, 1975–76, 1976–77, 1988–89, 1990–91, 1991–92, 1992–93, 1993–94, 1995–96, 1996–97, 1998–99, 1999–00, 2002–03, 2024–25 |
| FAI Junior Cup | 10 | 1964–65, 1996–97, 1997–98, 1998–99, 2001–02, 2002–03, 2003–04, 2009–10, 2019–20, 2024–25 |
