= Evan McLaughlin =

Irish footballer

Personal information
- Full name: Evan McLaughlin
- Date of birth: 30 March 2002 (age 24)
- Place of birth: Derry, Northern Ireland
- Positions: Midfielder; left back

Team information
- Current team: Waterford
- Number: 8

Youth career
- –2020: Derry City

Senior career*
Years	Team	Apps	(Gls)
2020–2023	Derry City	30	(1)
2022	→ Coleraine (loan)	20	(3)
2024–2025	Cork City	63	(8)
2026–	Waterford	23	(3)
- * Club domestic league appearances and goals as of 11:52, 9 November 2026 (UTC)

Evan McLaughlin (born 30 March 2002) is a Northern Irish professional footballer who plays as a midfielder or left back for League of Ireland Premier Division club Waterford. His former clubs are Derry City, Coleraine and Cork City.

== Career ==
=== Youth career ===
Derry man McLaughlin came through the academy at Derry City, playing for their under-17 side from 2018 to 2019, before playing for their under-19s from 2019 to 2021 when he made his first team debut.

=== Derry City ===
After being an unused substitute twice in 2020, McLaughlin made his senior debut on 2 July 2021, in a 2–0 win over Waterford at the Ryan McBride Brandywell Stadium, scoring his side's first goal in the 42nd minute of the game. On 24 July 2021, McLaughlin scored the decisive penalty in his sides penalty shootout victory away to Drogheda United in the FAI Cup. On 14 July 2022, he made his first European appearance of his career, coming off the bench in a 2–0 defeat away to Latvian side Riga in the UEFA Europa Conference League.

==== Coleraine loan ====
On 27 July 2022, McLaughlin signed a new contract with Derry City and on the same day joined NIFL Premiership club Coleraine until January 2023. On 13 August 2022, he made his debut for the club and scored a brace in a 3–1 win at home to Cliftonville.

==== Return from loan ====
On 2 January 2023, Derry City recalled him early from his loan spell after impressing during his time with Coleraine. McLaughlin made just 3 appearances in the 2023 season and announced at the end of the season that he would be leaving the club in search of more regular first team football, with manager Ruaidhrí Higgins stating that he would not be surprised to see McLaughlin back at the club in the future.

=== Cork City ===
On 15 December 2023, McLaughlin signed for recently relegated League of Ireland First Division club Cork City. On 9 March 2024, he scored his first goal for the club in a 2–0 win away to Longford Town. He scored 5 goals in a total of 36 appearances in all competitions as his side won the 2024 League of Ireland First Division title to earn promotion. In November 2024, he was named in the PFAI First Division Team of the Year as voted by his fellow professionals. On 6 January 2025, McLaughlin signed a new contract with the club. After signing his new deal, he revealed that he delayed his decision on the contract due to the 6 and a half hour commute to his hometown of Derry. On 21 April 2025, he scored his first goal of the season with an 89th-minute equaliser from the penalty spot against Waterford at Turners Cross, before his side went on to win the game minutes later in injury time. On 3 October 2025, McLaughlin scored twice in the FAI Cup Semi Final win over St Patrick's Athletic to help earn his side a place in the final. On 9 November 2025, he was part of the starting 11 in the 2025 FAI Cup final as his side were beaten 2–0 by Shamrock Rovers at the Aviva Stadium. He scored 7 goals in 34 appearances in all competitions in 2025, as the club were relegated back to the League of Ireland First Division by finishing bottom of the league.

=== Waterford ===
On 26 December 2025, it was announced that McLaughlin had signed for League of Ireland Premier Division club Waterford for an undisclosed fee. On 8 November 2026, he started in the 2026 FAI Cup final as his side were defeated 1–0 by his hometown club Derry City at the Aviva Stadium.

== International career ==
McLaughlin received his first international call up for the Republic of Ireland U21 side in October 2021 for their game against Montenegro U21, but was not capped.

== Career statistics ==
As of match played on 8 November 2026

Appearances and goals by club, season and competition
Club	Season	League			National Cup (Note: Includes FAI Cup)		League Cup (Note: Includes Northern Ireland Football League Cup)		Europe		Other		Total	
Club	Season	Division	Apps	Goals	Apps	Goals	Apps	Goals	Apps	Goals	Apps	Goals	Apps	Goals
Derry City	2020	LOI Premier Division	0	0	0	0	—		0 (Note: Appearance(s) in the UEFA Europa League)	0	—		0	0
Derry City	2021	LOI Premier Division	15	1	2	0	—		—		—		17	1
Derry City	2022	LOI Premier Division	12	0	0	0	—		1 (Note: Appearance in the UEFA Europa Conference League)	0	—		13	0
Derry City	2023	LOI Premier Division	3	0	0	0	—		0	0	0 (Note: Appearance in the President of Ireland's Cup)	0	3	0
Derry City	Total		30	1	2	0	—		1	0	0	0	33	1
Coleraine (loan)	2022–23	NIFL Premiership	20	3	—		4	3	—		—		24	6
Cork City	2024	LOI First Division	34	5	2	0	—		—		0 (Note: Appearance(s) in the Munster Senior Cup)	0	36	5
Cork City	2025	LOI Premier Division	29	3	5	4	—		—		0	0	34	7
Cork City	Total		63	8	7	4	—		—		0	0	70	13
Waterford	2026	LOI Premier Division	23	3	4	1	—		–		0 (Note: statsMSC)	0	27	4
Career Total			136	15	13	5	4	3	1	0	0	0	154	23

== Honours ==
=== Club ===
Cork City

- League of Ireland First Division (1): 2024

=== Individual ===
- PFAI First Division Team of the Year (1): 2024
