= Limerick & District League =

- Founded: 1971
- Country: (Republic of Ireland) Ireland
- Provincial FA: Munster Football Association
- Divisions: Premier League; Division 1A; Division 1B; Division 2A; Division 2B; Division 3A; Division 3B; Division 4 Youth Division 1 Youth Division 2 Under 17 Division 1 Under 17 Division 2
- Number of clubs: 113 (2018/19)
- Level on pyramid: 7–13
- Domestic cup(s): FAI Junior Cup; Munster Senior Cup
- Current champions: Fairview Rangers A.F.C.(2025–26)(16th title)
- Website: www.limerickjuniorsoccer.com

The Limerick & District League (LDL) is one of two association football leagues in County Limerick, along with the Limerick Desmond Football League. The league is organised by the Limerick & District League management committee, also referred to as the LDMC, and features amateur and junior clubs located east of Limerick's N20. This includes teams from Limerick City, North Tipperary and County Cork. The league consists of twelve divisions. Its top division, the Premier League, is a seventh level division in the Republic of Ireland football league system. The season runs from August to May. The league is covered regularly by local newspapers such as the Limerick Leader. Teams from the Limerick & District League compete in the FAI Cup, the FAI Intermediate Cup and the FAI Junior Cup.

In addition to teams from east Limerick, the league is home to Charleville A.F.C. (from Charleville, County Cork), Nenagh A.F.C. (from Nenagh, County Tipperary) and Newport Town A.F.C. (from Newport, County Tipperary). The winners of the top division in the league are presented with the Fran Mulally trophy, first named in 2005–06.

== History ==
The Limerick District Management Committee (LDMC) has been in existence since the 1930s, when they were responsible for the creation of Limerick F.C. The committee was also responsible for league football in the city.

In 1975, Newport Town A.F.C. joined the league from the Clare League.

The 2019–20 and 2020–21 seasons were cancelled due to the coronavirus pandemic.

== League pyramid ==
The Limerick & District League (LDL) season begins in August and concludes in May. The league consists of seven divisions.

| County Level | League(s) / division(s) |
|---|---|
| 1 | Premier League 12 clubs – 2 relegations |
| 2 | Premier A League 12 clubs – 2 promotions, 2 relegations |
| 3 | Division 1A 12 clubs – 2 promotions, 2 relegations |
| 4 | Division 1B 12 clubs – 2 promotions, 2 relegations |
| 5 | Division 2A 12 clubs – 2 promotions, 2 relegations |
| 6 | Division 2B 11 clubs – 2 promotions, 2 relegations |
| 7 | Division 3A 13 clubs – 2 promotions |

== Controversies ==
In September 2021, the LDL agreed to postpone its annual general meeting and meet with the Football Association of Ireland (FAI) after concerns were raised by club representatives about the league's finances.

In November 2022, the majority of league clubs expressed concern over the league's governance, including the lack of term limits and a failure to carry out a financial audit recommended by the FAI.

In June 2025, the FAI suspended the entire LDL committee after Sport Ireland flagged concerns about the association’s handling of complaints of “sustained harassment and bullying” in Limerick football. The case concluded in December 2025 without any sanctions being imposed. Five of the 11 committee members that were stood down pursued legal action against the FAI, claiming their reputations had been damaged as a result of a flawed investigative process. The FAI defended their decision, saying they had "...closed the review because the material was not available in a form capable of being put to respondents in a manner consistent with fair procedure.".

== Clubs ==
Below is a list of clubs playing in the Limerick District League.

Premier League (as of 2023/2024 season)

| Team | Home town/suburb | Ground |
|---|---|---|
| Aisling Annacotty | Annacotty | |
| Ballynanty Rovers | Ballynanty | Ballynanty Park |
| Carew Park | Southill/Roxboro | Carew Park |
| Coonagh Utd | Coonagh, Limerick | |
| Corbally United | Corbally, Limerick | |
| Fairview Rangers | Garryowen, Limerick | The Fairgreen |
| Geraldines | Garryowen, Limerick | Kilmurry Park |
| Janesboro F.C. | Janesboro, Limerick | Pearse Stadium |
| Mungret Regional | Mungret | Rathmale Pitch |
| Nenagh A.F.C. | Nenagh, County Tipperary | Brickfields |
| Pike Rovers | Southill, Limerick | Pike Rovers Complex |
| Regional United | Dooradoyle | |

== Past winners ==
| Season | Winner | Runners-up |
|---|---|---|
| 2025–26 | Fairview Rangers | Ballynanty Rovers |
| 2024–25 | Fairview Rangers | Pike Rovers |
| 2023–24 | Aisling Annacotty | Pike Rovers |
| 2022–23 | Pike Rovers | — |
| 2021–22 | Pike Rovers | Fairview Rangers |
| 2020–21 | Season abandoned due to coronavirus pandemic | |
| 2019–20 | Season abandoned due to coronavirus pandemic | |
| 2018–19 | Janesboro F.C. | Pike Rovers |
| 2017–18 | Janesboro F.C. | Pike Rovers |
| 2016–17 | Janesboro F.C. | Nenagh A.F.C. |
| 2015–16 | Carew Park | Pike Rovers |
| 2014–15 | Janesboro F.C. | |
| 2013–14 | Pike Rovers | |
| 2012–13 | Carew Park | |
| 2005–06 | Pike Rovers | |
| 2002–03 | Fairview Rangers | |
| 1989–90 | Janesboro F.C. | |
| 1982–83 | Janesboro F.C. | |
| 1980–81 | Geraldines A.F.C. | |
| 1979–80 | Geraldines A.F.C. | |
| 1975–76 | Fairview Rangers | |
| 1974–75 | Geraldines A.F.C. | |
| 1971–1972 | Janesboro F.C. | |
| 1970–71 | Janesboro F.C. | |
