= Limerick F.C. =

Association football club in Ireland

Limerick
- Full name: Limerick Football Club
- Nickname: Super Blues
- Founded: 1937
- Dissolved: 2020
- Ground: Markets Field
- Capacity: 2000
- 2019: League of Ireland First Division, 10th
Home colours	Away colours

Limerick Football Club was an association football club based in Limerick, Ireland who played in the League of Ireland and currently have teams competing in the underage National League of Ireland.

The first Limerick Football Club was founded in 1937 and has had a number of guises through its history, known at different times as Limerick, Limerick United, Limerick City and Limerick 37. Each manifestation of the club was the sole representative of senior football in Limerick city between 1937 and 2020.

Limerick won the League of Ireland title twice, in the 1959–60 and 1979–80 seasons, and the FAI Cup twice, in 1971 and 1982. They also won the League of Ireland Cup three times, 1975–76, 1992–93 and 2001–02. The club competed in European competitions on six occasions.

== History ==
Chart of yearly table positions for Limerick in League of Ireland

=== Foundation and early years ===
Limerick got its first taste of senior soccer in the early 1930s when the Limerick District Management Committee (LDMC) arranged a number of friendly matches between senior clubs such as Waterford F.C. and Bray and a local junior selection. The success of these fixtures prompted the LDMC to form a senior side and attempt to gain entry to the Free State League. Their application was accepted in June 1937 and a Limerick senior team replaced Dolphin who had withdrawn from the league. On 19 July 1937, a new, private company, Limerick Association Football and Sports Co. Ltd, was registered.

On 22 August 1937, Limerick played its first match. It was against Shamrock Rovers in the Dublin City Cup, a prominent competition that ran from the 1930s to the 1970s, and won 1–0. They ended the 1937–38 season in 10th place out of 12 teams, but managed to capture their first trophy when they beat Cork United 1–0 in the replayed final of the Munster Senior Cup at the Markets Field. During those early seasons, Limerick lined out in red-and-white striped jerseys and white shorts. When Waterford resigned from the league in 1941, the club purchased their blue jerseys and would wear blue and white for the next 40 years.

The 1940s saw Limerick make some big improvements on the playing field and they were twice runners-up in the League of Ireland (1943–44 and 1944–45), were beaten in two FAI Cup semi-finals (1942–43 and 1946–47) and were runners-up in the League of Ireland Shield in 1945–46. The latter was the forerunner of the League Cup, the third most important competition after the League and the FAI Cup. They won the Munster Senior Cup again in 1948–49. It was not until the 1950s that Limerick captured their first national title when they won the Shield in 1953. They added to this when they captured the Dublin City Cup in 1958–59, beating Drumcondra in the final.

=== League of Ireland champions and FAI Cup winners ===
Limerick captured their first League of Ireland championship in the 1959–60 season under the management of Limerick man Sonny Price, who had played for Limerick, Waterford and Glentoran. Although they lost their last match 3–2 to St. Patrick's Athletic on Sunday, 17 April 1960, they still managed to win the league by two points, ahead of Cork Celtic. Unlike other years, when the majority of the sides were local, this team had a nucleus of Dublin-based players who supplied six to the panel, with five from Limerick, two from Cork and the remainder from junior circles.

The Limerick board decided they wanted to develop an all-local team and so they brought in Ewan Fenton, then aged 29, from Wrexham to implement their plan, starting for the 1960–61 season. He was an immediate hit with staff, players and fans and his quiet and undemonstrative personality ensured he became very popular. He also helped build on the success that Sonny Price had gained with the team and introduced a great number of talented local players to League of Ireland football.

Limerick lost FAI Cup finals in 1965 and again in 1966 to Shamrock Rovers before they finally captured the title in 1971, beating Drogheda United 3–0 in a replay. That team included Andy McEvoy, Richie Hall, Kevin Fitzpatrick, Al Finucane, Dave Barrett, Sean Byrnes, Tony Meaney, Joe O’Mahony, Hughie Hamilton and Paddy Shortt. Fenton also advanced the careers of other notable Limerick players such as Dessie McNamara, Gerry McCarthy, Mick Doyle, Dick O’Connor, Johnny Walsh, Pat Nolan and Ger Duggan. Limerick had captured a further two Dublin City Cups under Fenton, in 1967 and 1970.

Ewan Fenton left Limerick in 1967 to take up a managerial position at Linfield, and enjoyed considerable success with the south Belfast club, winning seven titles in three years. The early 1970s saw some turbulent financial times for Limerick coupled with diminishing fortunes on the field. Fenton returned as manager for the 1975–76 season and introduced a number of young players, without much success in the league, but won the League Cup that season, beating Sligo Rovers 4–0 in the final. Frankie Johnson took over as manager for the 1976–77 season and Limerick were beaten 2–0 by Dundalk in the FAI Cup Final, but this was again coupled with a poor league performance.

=== Limerick United (1977 to 1983) ===
In 1977 the club changed their name to Limerick United. Other sources report that the name change occurred in 1979.

Eoin Hand arrived as player-manager from Portsmouth for the 1979–80 season and guided the club to its second League of Ireland Championship. Tony Meaney scored a penalty in the ultimate game, a 1–1 draw against Athlone Town, to finish one point ahead of Dundalk. Hand was still in charge when Limerick won the FAI Cup again in 1982, defeating Bohemians in the final at Dalymount Park. This marked Kevin Fitzpatrick's final game in goal after 22 seasons.

=== Limerick City (1983 to 1992) ===
Pat Grace, owner of the Kentucky Fried Chicken (KFC) franchise in Ireland and the main League of Ireland sponsor, joined Limerick United in April 1981 and was appointed chairman. Grace claimed to have been invited to join by the Markets Field club in order to help them address financial issues, with a majority shareholding promised in return, but this did not transpire and affairs at the club began to deteriorate after the FAI Cup win in 1982. Grace set up a separate club named Limerick City in early 1983 then, in April, resigned as a director from Limerick United and began to recruit Limerick United's players. Limerick City also attempted to replace the club in the League of Ireland and, with the league appearing reluctant to block their main sponsor's team from doing so, Limerick United went to the High Court at the beginning of the 1983–84 season. United succeeded in winning the case and obtained an injunction against the league replacing them. The ruling reinstated Limerick United to the League of Ireland and prevented City from taking their place.

The same year, Grace had another legal setback in the High Court when, following a dispute with KFC over ingredients, he had to change the name of his franchise as well as the name on the league's sponsorship. Meanwhile, Limerick United continued to experience financial hardship and fielded a team consisting entirely of amateur players for the first game of the season, losing 9–0 to Bohemians at Dalymount Park on 2 October 1984. The game was declared void by the league's committee and was replayed later in the season. On 9 October, the Limerick City players picketed the Markets Field for the home game against Waterford and succeeded in preventing the match from being played. The squad – all former United players – sided with Grace in the dispute, claiming that wages had not been paid on time until his involvement. While Limerick United admitted to missing payments, first team manager Mick Webb claimed Grace had failed to fulfil his obligations while chairman of Limerick United.

Soccer in the city was suspended for eight weeks pending a decision on the matter, resuming when Pat Grace won his appeal and the original High Court ruling was overturned. Grace changed the name of the club to Limerick City and also changed the colours from blue and white to yellow and green. Concerned about a legal battle over the renamed club's right to play at Markets Field, Grace entered into discussions with Old Crescent RFC in November 1983 about the purchase of 10 acres (4.0 ha) in Rathbane. In their first season as Limerick City, the club won the revived League of Ireland Shield for the first time since 1953 and beat Cobh Ramblers to win the Munster Senior Cup. The Shield competition was won on 22 April 1984, after Limerick beat UCD on penalties, in the last game played at the Markets Field before the club's departure to Rathbane.

==== Move to Hogan Park ====
The club moved out of the Markets Field to a new home at Hogan Park in Rathbane for the start of the 1984–85 season. This move ultimately proved to be unpopular with the fans and heralded a decline in the club's fortunes. The 1985–86 season saw the League of Ireland divided into two divisions for the first time – the top tier Premier Division and the second tier First Division — with Limerick City competing in the Premier Division. Billy Hamilton was brought in as player-manager in 1987. Hamilton had enjoyed considerable success as a player at Burnley and Oxford United and played in two World Cup finals with Northern Ireland. He stayed at Limerick for two seasons, finishing as the league's top scorer and guiding the club to a third-place league finish in his second season in charge.

However, the only trophy won during that period was the Munster Senior Cup in 1988 and Hamilton resigned in September 1989 with owner Pat Grace leaving shortly after. He was replaced by a new board of directors, with Fr. Joe Young as chairman. Towards the end of the 1989–90 season, the club took out a loan from the FAI. Although the loan was repaid to the association, by September 1990 Limerick City were seeking new investment with the future of the club reportedly at risk. While the club made it to the final of the League Cup in February of that season, they lost the match 2–0 to Derry City. At the end of the 1990–91 season, Limerick City were relegated for the first time in their history.

Young decided that, in order to return to the Premier Division, the club would need to appoint a new manager. An occasional West Brom fan, the chairman contacted their former assistant manager Sam Allardyce, who thought the offer was a wind-up from one of his teammates. After a tour of Limerick, Allardyce was appointed as player-manager for the 1991–92 season. He scored three times in 23 appearances and immediately brought Limerick City back to the top flight by winning the First Division. Fr. Joe Young and the new board changed the club's name back to Limerick F.C. and the kit colours back to blue and white.

=== Return of Limerick F.C. (1992 to 2005) ===
Allardyce remained at the club, scoring three times in 23 appearances, until 1992 when he left to take up a coaching role at Preston North End. Limerick finished a respectable sixth in the Premier Division the following season and also won the League Cup, beating St Patrick's Athletic in the final. Relegation was to follow the next season and a long period of mediocrity and disappointment was to follow.

Financial problems plagued the club and they had to rely on the goodwill of a local junior side, Pike Rovers, for a home ground for the 2000–01 season. Fr Joe Young departed as chairman and the new chairman, Danny Drew, took the club back to Rathbane in an attempt to revive their fortunes. The 2001–02 season saw another League Cup victory, this time over Derry City in the final, but no improvement in the league followed over the coming seasons.

In March 2005, Limerick F.C. returned to Hogan Park but were unable to drawdown a capital sports grant to improve the ground in November 2005 as they had only agreed a four year lease on the venue. In order to obtain a league licence and to avail of grants, Limerick's long-term future needed to be secured. With this in mind, the club entered into talks with their former chairman, Fr. Joe Young, for a 21-year lease on Hogan Park in February 2006. A lease was secured the same month, with the agreement that Fr. Young would have input at club level, and Limerick announced that they were ready to began the drawdown of a €400,000 grant to improve the ground. However, by July Fr. Young's solicitors had contacted the club to inform them that a lease would not be forthcoming as Young had decided to lease the ground to another unnamed party. In August, the Football Association of Ireland (FAI) were in negotiations with Young for a lease on Hogan Park.

At the end of the season, the FAI's Club Licensing First Instance Committee ruled against granting Limerick F.C. a licence for the upcoming 2007 season. In December 2006, the club appealed to the Club Licensing Appeal Board who upheld the original decision. Concerns about the infrastructure at Hogan Park were cited as the main reason for the club's failure to secure a licence.

=== Limerick 37 ===
The necessity for a new League of Ireland franchise in Limerick first became apparent in December 2006, when the FAI Club Licensing Appeal Board rejected Limerick FC's appeal against its prior failure to attain the UEFA licence necessary for admission to the League of Ireland's First Division for the 2007 season.

The FAI's decision effectively disenfranchised the incumbent Limerick FC and its chairman Danny Drew, although the organisation remained receptive to the continued participation of Limerick within senior football. To this end, FAI chief executive John Delaney openly solicited approaches from other interested parties within the city of Limerick even as he announced the rejection of Limerick FC's appeal: "We want a healthy Limerick based club in the new Eircom League of Ireland and if interested entities seek a licence, we would assess them carefully for their suitability to meet the criteria required to play in the league." On 3 January 2007, the FAI confirmed that its appeal for Limerick-based applicants to the league had garnered interest from a number of parties, one of which identified itself as Soccer Limerick, a consortium purporting to represent the entire spectrum of Limerick football, from schoolboy to Junior (amateur) level, and operating under the auspices of the Limerick Sports Partnership.

Eight days later, Soccer Limerick confirmed that its constituent committees had approved the submission of a formal application for a UEFA club licence, with a view to gaining entry to the First Division of the National League for the 2007 season, with a team called Limerick 37, named after the year that the original club was founded. Soccer Limerick spokesman Ger Finnan confirmed that Limerick 37 planned to stage home fixtures at Jackman Park, headquarters of the LDMC, and would announce the appointment of a first-team manager on Monday 15 January 2007. On 31 January, Limerick F.C. were reported to have lost their appeal to the High Court and the injunction against Limerick 37 was lifted. Paul McGee was subsequently appointed manager of Limerick 37, and signed 11 players before the start of the season.

With McGee's results and style of play not going down well with the home fans, the club opted to replace him with former player and manager Mike Kerley, who brought about mid-table respectability, as well as an end of season run which saw Limerick end Waterford's promotion hopes with a 5–1 win in Limerick, a 1–0 away defeat of eventual division winners Dundalk and a 1–1 draw away to Shelbourne, with Colin Scanlan's late equaliser denying Shelbourne the title and promotion in the 2008 season.

However, just weeks before the start of the 2009 season, Kerley and the club unexpectedly parted ways, and following a brief and unsuccessful stop-gap solution of a three-man management team, Limerick moved to appoint Pat Scully.

=== Limerick F.C. ===
The name of the club was changed back to Limerick F.C. for the start of the 2009 season. By mid-2009, the club was in serious financial difficulty. A Limerick businessman, Pat O'Sullivan, made a significant donation to the club that July. He joined the board as chairman in August 2009 and became the owner in February 2010. Among his stated objectives were to stabilise the finances of the club and to build strong community links such as community based club programmes and youth development programmes.

Under manager Pat Scully, Limerick finally ended their long stay in the First Division, winning the title and promotion to the Premier Division at the end of the 2012 season. Despite the achievement, Scully was sacked at the end of the season and Stuart Taylor was brought in as manager. The club also moved to Thomond Park in advance of the 2013 season. With a number of signings from both the UK and Europe, Limerick enjoyed a comfortable first season back in the Premier Division. The following season, however, Taylor was fired due to the club's poor form, and Martin Russell was appointed as his replacement. Russell steadied the ship and the club avoided relegation in 2014. However, in 2015, the club were relegated. A terrible start to the season saw Limerick stranded at the bottom after failing to win any of the first 21 games, and despite an incredible run of form which saw Limerick avoid automatic relegation, they were demoted after losing 2–1 on aggregate to Finn Harps in a playoff.

The following season, with a squad of full-time professionals in a division of part-time teams, was little more than a procession for Limerick as they cruised to the 2016 First Division title. They won their first 12 games to open up a huge points lead and only lost one match all season, winning the division with 6 games to spare. They also beat two Premier Division teams along the way to a place in the final of the League Cup, but lost 4–1 to St Patrick's Athletic.

After a poor start to the 2017 Premier Division, Martin Russell left his position and was temporarily replaced by Willie Boland, who had been manager of the underage teams. Limerick secured a permanent replacement with the appointment of Neil McDonald and the club finished the season in 7th place as well as advancing to the FAI Cup semi-final for the first time in many years. McDonald left the club in January 2018 to take up a position at Scunthorpe United and was replaced by Tommy Barrett, while Pat O'Sullivan announced his intention to sell his stake in the club. In September 2019, the club entered examinership and were eventually deducted 26 points, leaving them bottom of the First Division after finishing the league season in sixth place.

=== Treaty United ===
In December 2019, Limerick FC were on the verge of extinction after the examinership process to try to keep their trading company afloat ended unsuccessfully. The club had debts of approximately €490,000 and did not receive a League of Ireland licence for the 2020 season. A new entity, named Limerick United, were granted a League of Ireland First Division license in January 2020. However, they were forced to change the name to Treaty United before the season started. In February 2020, Treaty United withdrew applications to join the League of Ireland underage structures for the 2020 season. Treaty entered the league for the first time ahead of the 2021 League of Ireland First Division season.

== Stadiums ==
Limerick FC has used a number of venues around the city as their home ground over the years, including Markets Field in Garryowen, Jackman Park on Carey's Road, Hogan Park in Rathbane, Thomond Park and Pike Rovers ground at Crossagalla. The Markets Field has always been considered to be the spiritual home of football in the city as the club enjoyed considerable success at the venue and moving from there to Hogan Park heralded a serious decline in the club's fortunes. Up until 2012, and Limerick progress into the Premier Division the club was using Jackman Park, which belongs to the Limerick District League (LDMC), for home games. It has a training base at Knocklisheen, on the north side of the city. For the beginning of the new 2013 season, it was announced that Thomond Park would play host to Limerick FC's home games for the coming seasons with some sources estimating it would be 2015 before Limerick would get to return to the Markets Field

In March 2011 it was announced that the Markets Field had been purchased by the Limerick Enterprise Development Partnership (LEDP) with a charitable donation from the JP McManus Charitable Foundation, with a view towards Limerick FC returning to the venue sometime during 2012. The club has plans to develop the site into an 8,000 capacity, all-seated stadium. On promotion to the Airtricity League of Ireland Premier Division for the 2013 Season, Limerick moved to 26,500 capacity stadium Thomond Park for their home games. The club returned to the Markets Field on Friday 5 June 2015 for the first time in 31 years, losing 1–2 to Drogheda United in the League of Ireland Premier Division.

== European record ==
Limerick appeared in European competitions on six occasions in its history. In 12 matches they scored seven goals and while the club never won a European game, it drew twice. One of those draws was achieved at The Dell against a Southampton team that included former European Footballer of the Year Kevin Keegan and Mick Channon. In the home fixture famous rugby international Tony Ward gave Yugoslav international defender Ivan Golac a roasting.

Limerick first competed in 1960 in the European Cup against Young Boys, but suffered their heaviest aggregate defeat. Limerick moved their 1965 Cup Winners' Cup home leg to Dalymount Park – one of only two 'home' games played outside of Limerick. Pat Nolan is the only player ever to have scored for Limerick in Limerick in a European game.

The most famous European game was the 'home' match against Real Madrid in the European Cup in 1980. Because of concerns over crowd control at both The Markets Field and Thomond Park, the match was played at Lansdowne Road in Dublin. Although a crowd of up to 30,000 was expected, Dublin football fans stayed away en masse and only 6,500 people saw a Limerick team, under Eoin Hand, almost beat the aristocrats of European football. A number of controversial refereeing decisions, including a disallowed Johnny Matthews goal and a dubious penalty award, went against Limerick and they were beaten by 2–1. Des Kennedy scored twice in the tie, one at home and one in the 5–1 away defeat, in front of a crowd of 60,000 in Madrid.

=== Overview ===
Competition	Matches	W	D	L	GF	GA
European Cup	4	0	0	4	4	16
UEFA Cup	2	0	1	1	1	4
European Cup Winners' Cup	6	0	1	5	2	11
TOTAL	12	0	2	10	7	31

=== Matches ===
Season	Competition	Round	Opponent	Home	Away	Aggregate
1960–61	European Cup	PR	(Switzerland) Young Boys	0–5	2–4	2–9
1965–66	European Cup Winners' Cup	1R	(Bulgaria) CSKA Cherveno Zname	1–2	0–2	1–4
1971–72	European Cup Winners' Cup	1R	(Italy) Torino	0–1	0–4	0–5
1980–81	European Cup	1R	(Spain) Real Madrid	1–2	1–5	2–7
1981–82	UEFA Cup	1R	(England) Southampton	0–3	1–1	1-4
1982–83	European Cup Winners' Cup	1R	(Netherlands) Alkmaar	1–1	0–1	1–2

== Honours ==
- League of Ireland: 2
  - 1959–60, 1979–80
- FAI Cup: 2
  - 1970–71, 1981–82
- League of Ireland Cup: 3
  - 1975–76, 1992–93, 2001–02
- League of Ireland First Division: 3
  - 1991–92, 2012, 2016
- League of Ireland Shield: 2
  - 1953–54, 1983–84
- Dublin City Cup: 2
  - 1958–59, 1969–70
- Munster Senior League: 1
  - 1985–86
- Munster Senior Cup: 13
  - 1937–38, 1948–49, 1953–54, 1958–59, 1962–63, 1976–77, 1983–84, 1984–85, 1988–89, 1994–95, 2005–06, 2011–12, 2014–15

== Notable former players ==
This list includes former Limerick FC players who had distinguished careers at both Limerick and other League of Ireland or British clubs, or who gained international honours with their country.

- (England) Sam Allardyce
- (England) Kenny Clements
- (Republic of Ireland) Johnny Matthews
- (Northern Ireland) Billy Hamilton
- (Republic of Ireland) Tom Aherne
- (Republic of Ireland) Terry Conroy
- (Republic of Ireland) Peter Coyle
- (Republic of Ireland) Tim Cuneen
- (Republic of Ireland) Sean Cusack
- (Republic of Ireland) Eamonn Deacy
- (Republic of Ireland) Ken DeMange
- (Republic of Ireland) Al Finucane
- (Republic of Ireland) Kevin Fitzpatrick
- (Republic of Ireland) Johnny Gavin
- (Republic of Ireland) Tommy Gaynor
- (Republic of Ireland) Alfie Hale
- (Republic of Ireland) Eoin Hand
- (Republic of Ireland) Willie Hayes
- (Republic of Ireland) Rory Keane
- (Republic of Ireland) Des Kennedy
- (Republic of Ireland) Andy McEvoy
- (Republic of Ireland) Chiedozie Ogbene
- (Republic of Ireland) Turlough O'Connor
- (Republic of Ireland) Davy Walsh
- (Republic of Ireland) Johnny Walsh
- (Republic of Ireland) Tony Ward
- (Wales) Brian Flynn
- (Scotland) Ally Dawson
- (Scotland) Ewan Fenton
- (Scotland) Willie Stevenson

=== Soccer Writers' Association of Ireland Awards ===
==== Personality of the Year ====
The Personality of the Year was first presented in 1961 and is the flagship award of the Soccer Writers' Association of Ireland (SWAI).

- Eoin Hand 1980
- Al Finucane 1967

==== Player of the Month ====
The SWAI Player of the Month Award has been in existence since 1971.

- Ian Turner – October 2015
- Vinny Faherty – August 2015
- Rory Gaffney – August 2014
- Ken DeMange – December 1992
- Billy Hamilton – September 1988
- Tommy Gaynor – March 1985
- Al Finucane – January 1985
- Liam Murphy – February 1984
- Des Kennedy – September 1980
- Brendan Storan – November 1979
- Eoin Hand – September 1979
- John Herrick – April 1977

== Managers ==
=== Notable former managers ===
- (Scotland) Ewan Fenton (1960–67), (1970–72), (1975–76)
- (Republic of Ireland) Paddy Coad (1967–68)
- (Republic of Ireland) Eoin Hand (1979–83)
- (Northern Ireland) Billy Hamilton (1987–89)
- (England) Sam Allardyce (1991–92)
- (Republic of Ireland) Paul McGee (1 Feb 2007 – 31 Dec 2007)
- (England) Neil McDonald (2017–2018)
