= Garryowen, Limerick =

Neighbourhood of Limerick city, Ireland

Garryowen Garraí Eoin
- Population centre
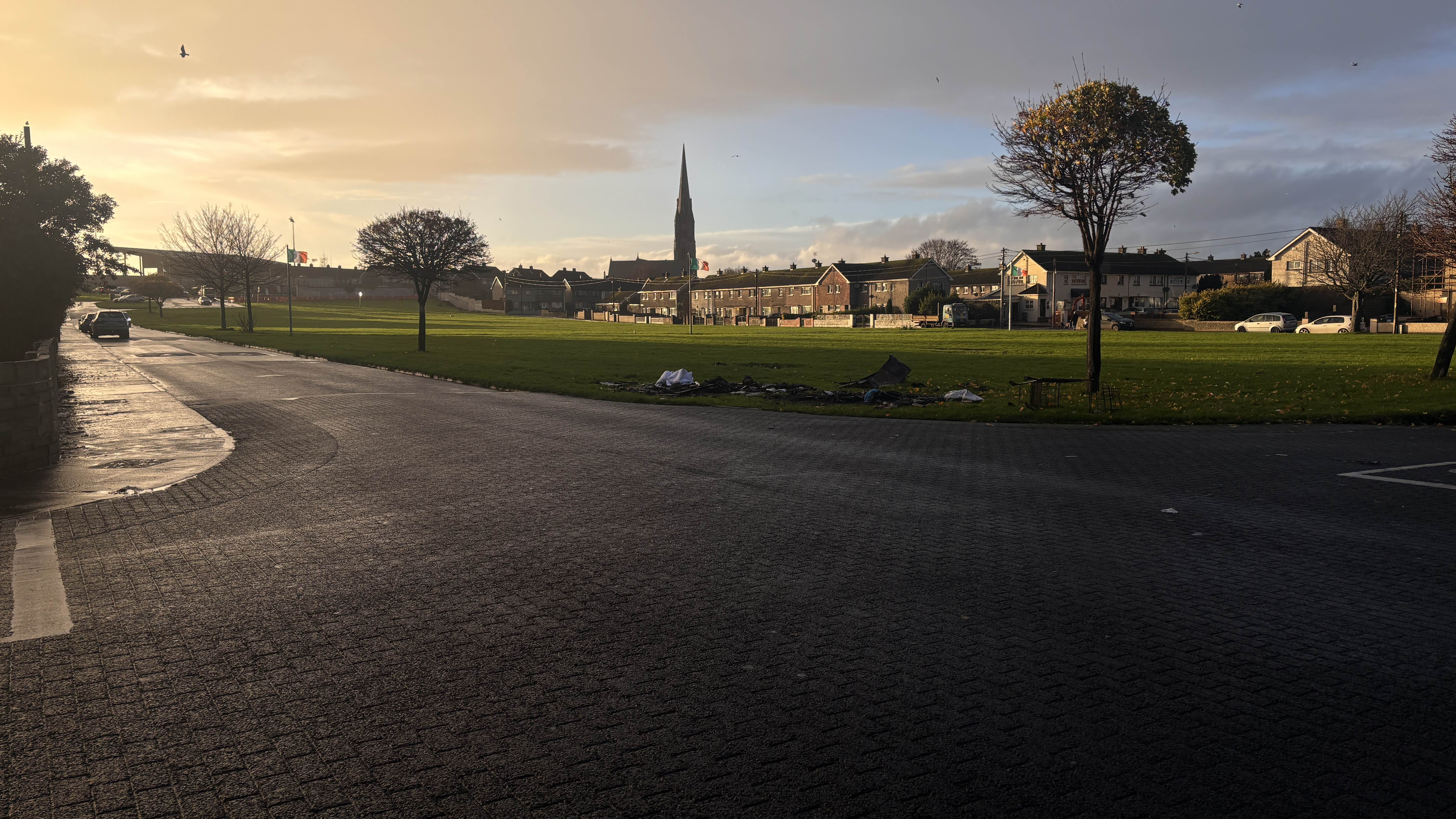
- Garryowen Green, at the centre of the neighbourhood

- Location in Ireland
- Coordinates: 52°39′32″N 08°36′53″W
- Country: Ireland
- Province: Munster
- County: County Limerick
- Time zone: UTC+0 (WET)
  - Summer (DST): UTC-1 (IST (WEST))

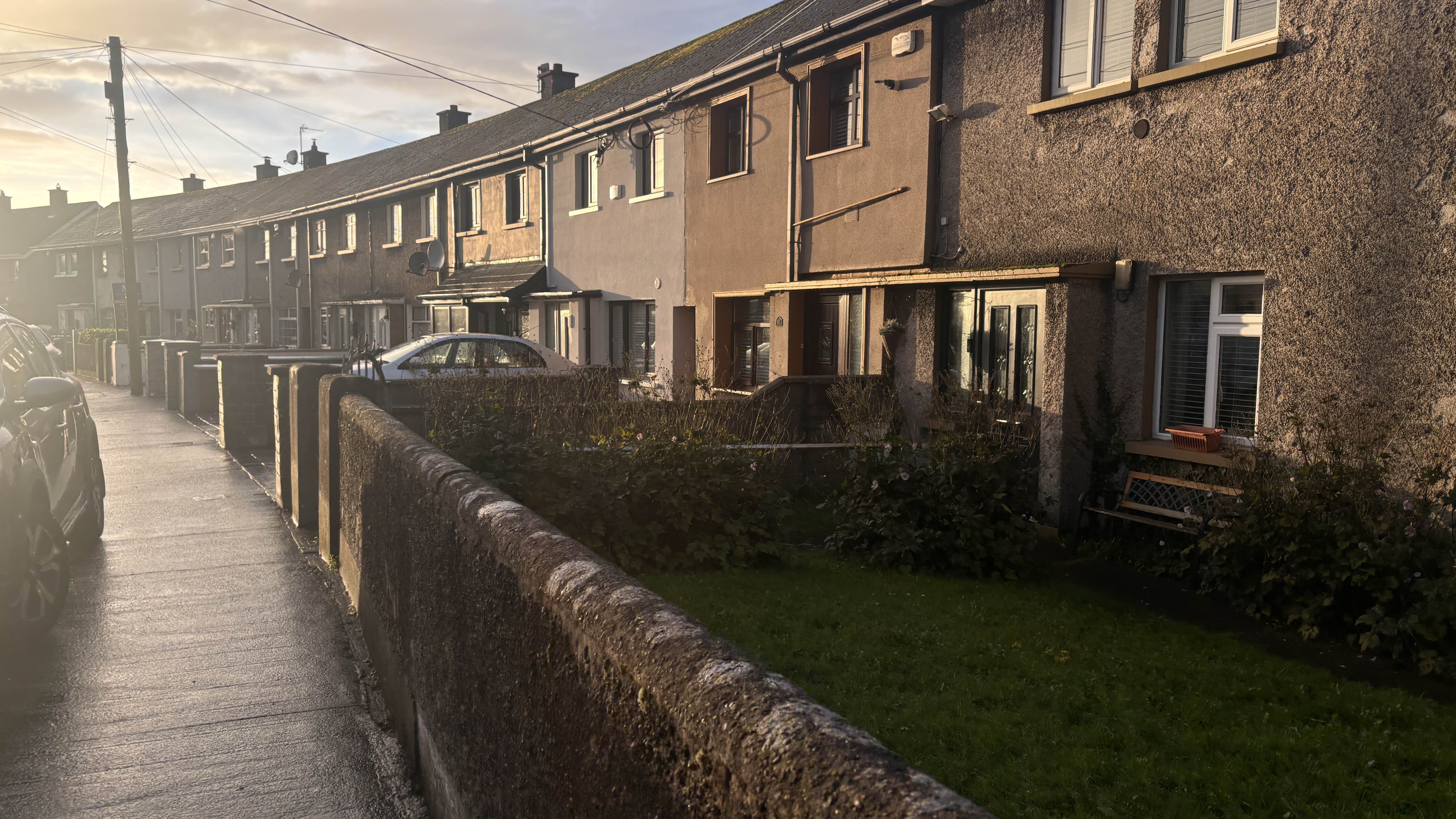
Terraced housing on West Singland Road

Garryowen (Irish: Garraí Eoin) is a neighbourhood in Limerick, Ireland.

== History ==
The word Garryowen is a transliteration of the Irish Garraí Eoin - "the garden of Owen" - and relates to the association in the 12th century between St John's Church and the Knights Templar whose house in Limerick was dedicated to John the Baptist. In medieval times Garryowen was located just outside the Irishtown area of the walled city of Limerick. The citadel (located in the grounds of St. John's Hospital) was the Irishtown's main fortification.

In 1690, it was the scene of a valiant Jacobite defence - the battle of the breach - which was fought nearby during the Williamite War of 1688–91. The sally port of the original stronghold has been incorporated into the structure of St John's Hospital. Other parts of the city walls can still be seen within the hospital grounds. The Citadel remained in use as a military barracks until 1752. St John's Gate was situated on the main roadway, nearby, but no trace of it now remains.

== Landmarks ==
St John's Cathedral is located in the area and dates from 1861 and has Ireland's tallest spire at 94m.

St John's Hospital is located adjacent to the cathedral which dates back to 1780 and was founded by Lady Lucy Hartstonge and other benefactors as a Fever and Lock Hospital and treated epidemics during the Great Famine (1845-1847).

St John's Square is located across the way from the cathedral and was Limerick’s first example of fashionable architecture and civic spaces and was completed in 1751.

== Amenities ==
Garryowen Football Club, a prominent Rugby Union club in Ireland's AIB League has its origins in the area; however it is no longer located in the neighbourhood of Garryowen but rather in the Dooradoyle area of the Limerick Suburbs. The Markets Field was Garryowen's home ground until 1958 when they moved to Dooradoyle. The Markets Field has since been in use as a greyhound racing stadium until July 2010. It is the home of Limerick Senior Soccer following the acquisition of the grounds by Limerick Enterprise Development Partnership.

== In popular culture ==
- The garryowen kick; a garryowen is a very high up and under kick (named after the rugby club) designed to put the opposing team under pressure, by allowing the kicking team time to arrive under and compete for the high ball.
- The Garryowen air, is an Irish tune for a quickstep dance. This song emerged in the late 18th century, when it was a drinking song of rich young roisterers in Limerick. It obtained immediate popularity in the British Army through the 5th (Royal Irish) Lancers.
- Garryowen was also the title of a 1920s film. It concerns an impoverished Irish gentleman who tries to rescue his family from ruin by running his horse Garryowen at the Epsom Derby.
- "Sean South of Garryowen", is an Irish republican ballad written by Sean Costelloe to the tune of another republican ballad "Roddy McCorley" and popularised by the Wolfe Tones. Another rebel song, "Jackets Green", mentions Garryowen.
