= Southill, Limerick =

Area of Limerick, Ireland

Southill (Irish: Cnoc Theas) is an area in the south of Limerick, Ireland consisting of four housing estates: O'Malley Park, Keyes Park, Kincora Park and Carew Park.

Unemployment rates in the area as of 2003 were at four times the national average, with only 50% of adults in Southill having completed formal education. A report from 1982 showed two-thirds of Southill's population were under the age of 18, with 94 percent having left school at the age of 16. Several reports done since the initial report in 1982 have shown similar trends. In the media, Southill is known for its crime rate, which is contributed to by gangland feuds, turf wars, and poverty in the area. However, efforts are currently being made to rejuvenate the area.

== Rejuvenation ==
On 21 January 2008, plans were announced to rebuild 2,000 homes in the Southill and Moyross areas in Limerick City, after dialogue with residents who wanted to feel safe in their homes. A key aim is to lower the local crime rates. Some 760 houses in O'Malley Park and Keyes Park in Southill were to be demolished and rebuilt. Before being rehoused in the locality, residents would need a certificate of eligibility. Eviction orders would be enforced and welfare payments would be linked to contracts of accommodation. President Mary McAleese welcomed the plan, saying "Today is about communities saying we're done with the past, we're not doing it again, and the future is going to be very different." In 2009 President McAleese officially opened Southill Area Centre, a new purpose built area centre for the Southill community. However, on 21 January 2012, plans were suspended due to the recession, and remain postponed indefinitely.
