= Markets Field =

Sports stadium in Limerick, Ireland

- Páirc an Mhargaidh
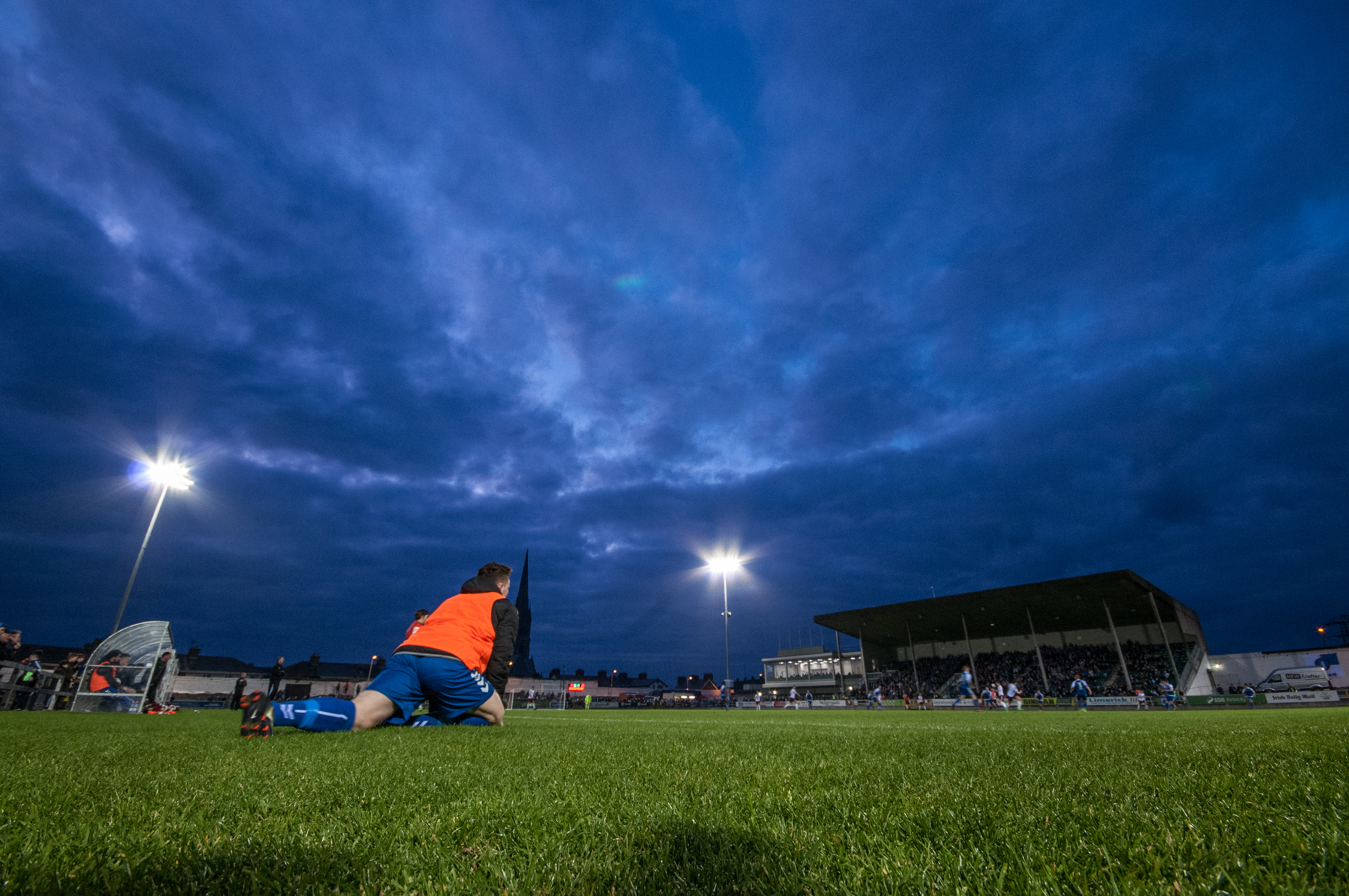
- Interactive map of Markets Field
- Location: Garryowen, Limerick
- Coordinates: 52.6603°N 8.6149°W
- Owner: Limerick Enterprise Development Partnership
- Capacity: 3,075 (1,710 seated)
- Surface: Grass
- Scoreboard: Yes
- Pitch size: 124 by 80 metres (136 by 87 yd)
- Public transit: Limerick railway station Mulgrave Street bus stop

Construction
- Opened: 1886
- Renovated: 2014

Tenants
- Treaty United FC (2021–present); Treaty United WFC (2020–present); Limerick FC (1937–2019); Limerick GAA (1886–1932); Garryowen FC (1886–1957)

The Markets Field is a UEFA category two stadium in Garryowen, Limerick, Ireland and the home ground of Treaty United. Formerly the home of Limerick FC, it has a capacity of 3,075.

After departing for Hogan Park in 1984, Limerick F.C. returned to Markets Field in 2015 and were the principal tenant until their demise in 2019. The ground has hosted underage international fixtures in 2015 and 2021, as well as the 2016 League of Ireland Cup final between Limerick and St Patrick's Athletic.

== History ==
Markets Field was first used as a sporting venue in 1886. A Limerick Chronicle newspaper from that time reported that the Irish Cycling Association and the Gaelic Athletic Association paid £8 per day for the use of the Markets Field over three consecutive weekends. The first Gaelic games held at the ground took place on 19 September 1886. Rugby was also played at the venue for the first time that same year and the ground hosted the 1888 Munster Cup final where Queens College (UCC) beat Garryowen by a try to nil.

The venue later hosted its first Limerick County Hurling Championship final on 22 November 1896, which was played between Caherline and Ballingarry. The ground was fully enclosed in 1898. The county final remained at the Markets Field, with the exception of 1916 and 1919, until the late 1920s when the finals were moved to the Gaelic Grounds. Tournament games continued to be played in the Markets Field up to 1932. The ground also hosted inter-county games. It was the site of Munster championship games in both hurling and Gaelic football, with most of the All-Ireland semi-finals between Munster and Connacht teams taking place there in the 1900s. The ground was also used by Young Irelands GAA club for training and matches.

It was also the home of Garryowen from 1886 until 1957, when the club moved to new facilities in Dooradoyle. The Markets Field hosted the first meeting of the two oldest rugby clubs in the Munster Senior Cup, Garryowen and Cork Constitution, in 1900. The ground was also chosen to host the first New Zealand men's national rugby union team rugby match against Munster in 1905, which was attended by 4,000 spectators. The Munster branch of the Irish Rugby Football Union offered to purchase the ground in the 1930s but were turned down, leading the construction of Thomond Park as a dedicated rugby facility across the city.

Until 2010, the stadium hosted greyhound racing, when Limerick Greyhound Stadium opened in the south-west of the city.

Limerick F.C. was formed in 1937 and Markets Field became the association football club's home ground. In 1962, Markets Field hosted a friendly match between Limerick and Liverpool F.C. which the visitors won 3–5. The stadium hosted European football for the first time in 1981, when Southampton F.C. beat Limerick 0–3 in the 1981–82 UEFA Cup. The following season, Markets Field was the setting for Limerick's 1–1 draw with Dutch side AZ Alkmaar in the 1982–83 European Cup Winners' Cup.

Limerick F.C. departed Markets Field for Hogan Park in April 1984. Discussions were held with the stadium owners, Bord na gCon (the Irish Greyhound Board), in 2009 about Limerick F.C. returning to Markets Field, who were by then playing in Jackman Park. After the Irish Greyhound Board also vacated in 2010, the future of the ground was left in doubt.

=== Purchase and renovations ===
On 2 March 2011, the JP McManus Foundation confirmed they had purchased the ground from Bord na gCon. Although the foundation had provided the funding, the owners of Markets Field would be the Limerick Enterprise Development Partnership (LEDP), a charitable organisation with links to JP McManus. By October 2012, Limerick F.C. had announced their intention to return to their former home. After mooted dates but no progress, Limerick instead moved from Jackman Park to Thomond Park in 2013 while the pitch at Markets Field was re-laid.

Work on the pitch's new playing surface was completed by January 2014. In early 2014, the Irish government announced funding for the redevelopment of the stadium after planning permission was granted. The LEDP and the JP McManus Foundation provided additional funding towards stadium renovations. Although the redevelopment work began in January 2015, further delays announced in February prevented Limerick F.C. returning to Markets Field and the club relocated to Jackman Park for the start of the 2015 League of Ireland season.

The club returned to Markets Field in 2015. The stadium hosted its first match in the refurbished ground on 5 June 2015, a League of Ireland Premier Division match between Limerick and Drogheda United. Limerick F.C. remained as the principal tenant of Markets Field until their demise in 2019.

The Garryowen venue later became the home ground of Treaty United. In May 2025, the LEDP announced that Treaty had signed a long-term lease at Markets Field.

== Layout ==
The refurbished Main Stand holds 1,340 spectators for the home supporters and contains a corporate box. The new tunnel and dressing rooms are under the Main Stand and there are three turnstiles named after Limerick football legends. Opposite the main stand is the Popular Side, where the team dugouts and television gantry are located. Away supporters were previously housed in a demountable stand, with 360 seats, behind the Geraldine Villas goal and entered through a gate at this end. In November 2022, a row of seats in the demountable stand collapsed during the 2022 First Division play-off final between Galway United and Waterford F.C., bringing the game to a halt in order to evacuate the stand. As of February 2025, this stand remains closed to supporters. The Popular Side and the Cathedral End are both banked standing areas, with the former behind the dugouts and the latter housing the scoreboard. In 2016 the playing surface won the FAI Pitch of the Year Award. The ground itself has no car parking.

== Greyhound racing ==
The Limerick Greyhound Company was formed in 1933 but it was not until 1937 when racing began. The first directors were T.F.Ryan and J.P. Frost. The 465-yard circuit came to prominence in 1939 when it was selected by the Irish Coursing Club to hold the Irish Greyhound Derby for first and only time. The event was won by Marchin' Thro' Georgia who won the final in a new track record time of 30.05.

The track hosted the classic race the Irish St Leger in 1940 before it moved permanently to Limerick in 1944. The track also staged the Irish Oaks in 1942. The allocation of the 1943 Grand National did not help because due to the lack of hurdlers during the war Mr Ryan the chairman of Limerick Stadium was left with no choice but to cancel the event. Other events that took place at Limerick were the Bulger Cup and Kennedy Memorial Cup and J. P. McManus started as a bookmaker at the track and earned the nickname 'Sundance Kid'.

In 1958 the Irish Greyhound Board was given the responsibility of all tracks in Ireland with the exception of the Ulster tracks, that would remain under the jurisdiction of the Irish Coursing Club. They installed a new totalisator system in 1960 as improvements became commonplace under the new ownership, including a new stand costing over £60,000. Brendan O’Connell was Racing Manager for over thirty years from 1966.

The track closed in 2009 with the entire operation moving to the newly built Limerick Greyhound Stadium at Greenpark. Racing Manager Gus Ryan retired after 42 years in racing.

=== Track records ===
Extended content

Yards	Greyhound	Time	Date	Notes
300	Lucky Blunder	16.62	1970	
300	Lazuli Mountain	16.45	25 September 1971	
300	Fionntra Favour	16.34	3 October 1983	
300	Clon Flash	16.26	19 August 1996	
300	Go Queen Go	16.27	4 October 2001	
300	Paws and Pray	16.20	24 November 2001	
300	You Said So	16.15	16 June 2002	
300	Silkey Joe	16.11	31 January 2004	
300	Silkey Joe	16.06	15 January 2005	
300	Ibetx Dot Com	15.99	22 December 2007	
300	Primondo	15.91	5 July 2008	
300	Tarbrook Henry	15.76	14 August 2008	
315	Well Squared	17.84	1938	
525	Master Eamonn	30.15	July 1939	Irish Derby heats
525	Irish Rambler	30.10	July 1939	Irish Derby semi-finals
525	Marching Through Georgia	30.02	15 July 1939	Irish Derby Final
525	Fair Mistress	29.98	19 September 1942	Oaks heats
525	Top Customer	29.27	1979	
525	Flaming King	29.24	1968	
525	Flaming King	29.15	23 September 1968	
525	Squire Jones	29.12	December 1983	
525	Grove Whisper	29.06	13 December 1986	
525	Aulton Slippy	28.94	15 April 1988	
525	Deep Decision	28.37	31 May 1997	
525	Judicial Post	28.10	27 October 2002	
525	Catunda Harry	27.99	17 June 2007	
550	Dark Shadow	31.37	1945	St Leger final
550	Flintfield Grosvenor	30.98	June 1949	
550	Prince of Bermuda	30.66	November 1956	St Leger final
550	Flaming King	30.48	19 October 1968	
550	Ballybeg Prim	30.44	18 October 1975	St Leger final
550	Oran Jack	30.20	26 September 1981	St Leger 2nd Rd & National record
550	Oran Jack	30.16	3 October 1981	St Leger semi final & National record
550	Morans Beef	30.06	20 October 1984	
550	Frisby Flashing	29.66	9 October 1999	St Leger semi-final
550	Frisby Flashing	29.64	16 October 1999	St Leger final
550	Manic Ranger	29.59	10 June 2002	
550	Larking About	29.59	22 June 2002	St Leger semi-final
550	Mountleader Rolf	29.51	24 May 2003	
550	Droopys Deco	29.50	28 May 2007	
550	Hondo Dingle	29.32	2 June 2007	
550	Skywalker Prince	29.50	2 June 2007	
550	The Other Sonic	29.46	19 May 2008	St Leger first round
550	Shelbourne Aston	29.38	25 May 2008	St Leger second round
550	Timor Blue	29.33	30 May 2009	St Leger third round
600	Maidens Breach	35.25	1950	
600	Nancys Laurel	34.70	13 September 1952	
700	Muskerry Cream	40.85		
700	Speir Bhean	40.80	August 1954	
700	Rovingo	40.29	1970	
700	Greenville Queen	40.07	2 November 1970	
700	Dromlara Champ	39.75	23 August 1975	
700	Game Misty	39.53	20 September 1990	
700	Frosty Rose	38.72	23 July 2001	
700	Sparkling Wave	38.68	1 June 2002	
700	Hondo Dingle	38.62	25 September 2006	
700	Mucky Tony	38.40	13 September 2008	
700	Summerfield Jean	38.32	5 September 2009	
750	One More Stop	42.12	8 April 2000	
750	Related Object	41.73	23 September 2002	
750	Tinas Girl	41.64	26 July 2003	
750	Nobody Wants Me	41.53	9 July 2005	
1000	Wise Susie	57.94	27 January 2007	
525 H	Jerrys Memory	30.95	9 September 1966	
525 H	Own Kuda	30.35	17 May 1975	
525 H	Silver Light	30.10	15 September 1976	
525 H	Ballymac Mich	29.14	4 August 2003	
525 H	Goofys Lofty	29.10	31 May 2004	
525 H	Lemon Rambo	28.91	9 October 2004	
525 H	Razldazl Denys	28.79	29 November 2008	
