= List of association football clubs in the Republic of Ireland =

Traditionally, association football clubs in the Republic of Ireland have been classified as either senior, intermediate or junior. These classifications effectively categorise clubs who compete in national, provincial and county leagues respectively.

== Senior/National leagues ==
=== League of Ireland ===
==== Premier Division ====
Locations of Premier Division teams
Locations of Dublin Premier Division teams

Team	Home city/suburb	Stadium	Capacity
Bohemians	Dublin (Phibsborough)	Dalymount Park	4,500
Derry City	Derry	Brandywell	6,300
Drogheda United	Drogheda	United Park	2,500
Dundalk	Dundalk	Oriel Park	4,500
Galway United	Galway	Eamonn Deacy Park	5,000
St Patrick's Athletic	Dublin (Inchicore)	Richmond Park	5,500
Shamrock Rovers	Dublin (Tallaght)	Tallaght Stadium	10,716
Shelbourne	Dublin (Drumcondra)	Tolka Park	5,700
Sligo Rovers	Sligo	The Showgrounds	4,200
Waterford	Waterford	RSC	5,160

==== First Division ====
Locations of the First Division teams

Team	Home city/suburb	Stadium
Athlone Town	Athlone	Athlone Town Stadium
Bray Wanderers	Bray	Carlisle Grounds
Cobh Ramblers	Cobh	St. Colman's Park
Cork City	Cork	Turners Cross
Finn Harps	Ballybofey	Finn Park
Kerry	Tralee	Mounthawk Park
Longford Town	Longford	Bishopsgate
Treaty United	Limerick	Markets Field
UCD	Dublin	UCD Bowl
Wexford	Crossabeg	Ferrycarrig Park

==== Former League of Ireland clubs ====
Apart from the current twenty members, at least 38 other clubs have competed in the League of Ireland at one time or another. Some of these clubs are still active, playing in intermediate and junior leagues. The list below only includes teams that played in the A Division, the Premier Division and the First Division.

Team	Home town/suburb	Home ground	Current league
Albert Rovers	Cork	Flower Lodge	
Bray Unknowns	Bray	Carlisle Grounds	
Brideville	The Liberties, Dublin	Richmond Park; Harold's Cross Stadium	
Brooklyn	Merchants Quay	Chalgrove Terrace	
Cabinteely	Cabinteely, Dublin	Kilbogget Park	
Cork	Cork	The Mardyke	
Cork City	Cork	The Mardyke	
Cork Alberts	Cork	Flower Lodge; Turners Cross	
Cork Athletic	Cork	The Mardyke	
Cork Bohemians	Cork	Turners Cross	
Cork Hibernians	Cork	The Mardyke	
Cork United	Cork	The Mardyke	
Dolphin	Dolphin's Barn	Dolphin Park; Harold's Cross Stadium; Tolka Park	
Drumcondra	Drumcondra, Dublin	Tolka Park	Leinster Senior League
Dublin City	Fingal	various	
Dublin United	Donnybrook, Dublin	Beech Hill; Anglesea Road	
Evergreen United / Cork Celtic	Cork	Turners Cross	
Fordsons	Cork	Ballinlough Road	
Frankfort	Drumcondra, Dublin	Richmond Road	
Home Farm	Whitehall, Dublin	Tolka Park	Leinster Senior League
Jacobs	Crumlin, Dublin	Rutland Avenue	
Kildare County	Newbridge, County Kildare	Station Road	
Kilkenny City	Kilkenny	Buckley Park	
Limerick	Limerick	Markets Field	
Mervue United	Galway	Fahy's Field	Galway & District League
Midland Athletic	Whitehall, Dublin	The Thatch	
Monaghan United	Monaghan	Gortakeegan	Monaghan Cavan League
Newcastlewest	Newcastle West	Ballygowan Park	Limerick Desmond League
Olympia	The Coombe, Dublin	Bellevue Lodge	
Pioneers	Dublin	Strand Hall; The Thatch	Leinster Senior League
Rathmines Athletic	Rathmines	Rathmines Park	
Reds United	Ringsend	Glenmalure Park	
Salthill Devon	Salthill	Drom Soccer Park	Galway & District League
St. Francis	The Liberties/Clondalkin	John Hyland Park	Leinster Senior League
St. James's Gate	Crumlin, Dublin	Iveagh Grounds	Leinster Senior League
Shelbourne United	Ringsend	Beech Hill; Anglesea Road; Glenmalure Park	
Shamrock Rovers B	Tallaght	Tallaght Stadium	
Sporting Fingal	Fingal	Morton Stadium	
Thurles Town	Thurles	Thurles Greyhound Stadium	North Tipperary District League
Transport	Bray/Harold's Cross	Carlisle Grounds; Harold's Cross Stadium	Leinster Senior League
YMCA	Sandymount	YMCA Sports Grounds	

== Intermediate/Provincial leagues ==
=== Leinster Senior League ===
==== Senior Divisions (2025–26) ====
Senior Sunday

Team	Home town/suburb	Home county	Home ground
Bangor Celtic	Crumlin	County Dublin	The Transport Club
Ballymun United	Ballymun	County Dublin	Ballymun Soccer Complex
Finglas United	Finglas	County Dublin	Larney Park
Inchicore Athletic	Inchicore	County Dublin	Bernard Curtis Park
Kilbarrack United	Kilbarrack	County Dublin	Greendale Road
Killester Donnycarney F.C.	Killester & Donnycarney	County Dublin	Haddon Park
Lucan United	Lucan	County Dublin	O'Hanlon Park, Celbridge
Malahide United	Malahide	County Dublin (Fingal)	Gannon Park
St. Francis F.C.	Baldonnel	County Dublin	John Hyland Park
St. Mochta's F.C.	Porterstown & Clonsilla	County Dublin (Fingal)	Porterstown Road
Tolka Rovers	Glasnevin	County Dublin	Frank Cooke Park
UCD (res.)	Belfield	County Dublin	UCD Bowl
Usher Celtic	Dublin quays	County Dublin	War Memorial Gardens
Wayside Celtic	Kilternan	County Dublin	Jackson Park

Senior 1

Team	Home town/suburb	Home county	Home ground
Arklow Town	Arklow	County Wicklow	Travers Insurances Park
Bluebell United	Bluebell	County Dublin	Capco Park
Crumlin United	Crumlin	County Dublin	Pearse Park
Edenderry Town	Edenderry	County Offaly	Paddy Maloney Park
Glebe North	Balbriggan	County Dublin (Fingal)	Old Market Green
Hartstown Huntstown F.C.	Hartstown & Huntstown	County Dublin (Fingal)	Hartstown Park
Home Farm	Drumcondra	County Dublin	Whitehall Stadium
Kilnamanagh A.F.C.	Kilnamanagh	County Dublin	Ned Kelly Park
Liffey Wanderers	Ringsend	County Dublin	Irishtown Stadium
Maynooth Town	Maynooth	County Kildare	NUI Astro Maynooth
Montpelier F.C.	Arbour Hill	County Dublin	Grangegorman Pitch
Sacred Heart	Tallaght	County Dublin	Joe Maughan Park
Skerries Town	Skerries	County Dublin (Fingal)	Park Lane
St. Patrick's C.Y.F.C.	Irishtown	County Dublin	Irishtown Stadium

Senior 1A

Team	Home town/suburb	Home ground
Ayrfield United	Ayrfield	Blunden Drive
Blackrock College A.F.C.	Blackrock	Stradbrook
Castleknock Celtic	Castleknock, Dublin	Hartstown Park Astro
Drumcondra FC	Drumcondra, Dublin	Baskin Lane
Dublin Bus FC	Ronanstown	Coldcut
Inchicore Athletic	Inchicore, Dublin	Bernard Curtis Park
Larkview Boys	Kimmage, Dublin	Whelan Park
Leixlip United	Leixlip, County Kildare	Leixlip Amenities Sports Centre
Newbridge Town	Newbridge, County Kildare	Station Road, Newbridge
Portlaoise AFC	Portlaoise, County Laois	Portlaoise AFC
St. John Bosco	Drimnagh, Dublin	Brickfield Astro
St. Kevin’s Boys	Santry, Dublin	St. Aidans School Astro
Templeogue United	Templeogue	St McDaras School
Usher Celtic	Islandbridge	War Memorial Gardens

Senior 1B

Team	Home town/suburb	Home ground
Ardmore Rovers	Bray, County Wicklow	Wolfe Tone Community Centre
Ballyfermot United	Ballyfermot	Cold Cut
Drogheda Town FC	Drogheda, County Louth	Marian Park
Dublin University	Trinity College Dublin	College Park
Dunboyne AFC	Dunboyne, County Meath	Dunboyne AFC
Finglas United	Finglas	Larney Park
Hartstown Huntstown	Hartstown/Huntstown	Hartstown Park
Kilmore Celtic	Kilmore, Dublin	Oscar Traynor Centre
Leicester Celtic	Rathfarnham, Dublin	Loreto Park
Oliver Bond Celtic	Dublin 8	Grangegorman Grass
Raheny United	Raheny, Dublin	St. Anne's Park
Rush Athletic	Rush, County Dublin	St. Catherine's Park
Sheriff YC	Sheriff Street, Dublin	Clontarf All Weather Pitch
Tullamore Town	Tullamore, County Offaly	Leah Victoria Park

==== Selected others ====
This is a selection of teams playing in the lower levels of the Leinster Senior League.

Team	Home town/suburb	Home ground
Beechwood	Milltown, Dublin	Royal Hospital, Donnybrook
Dundrum	Dundrum, Dublin	Meadowbrook Park
Drumcondra	Drumcondra, Dublin	Baskin Lane
Glenville	Palmerstown, Dublin	Palmerstown School
Manortown United	Perrystown	Greentrees Park
Phoenix F.C.	Scribblestown & Ashtown	Scribblestown Pitch
Pioneers	Dublin Airport	ALSAA Sports Complex
Stella Maris	Drumcondra, Dublin	Dublin Port Stadium
T.E.K. United	Blackrock, Dublin	Stradbrook
Terenure College A.F.C.	Terenure	Bushy Park
Transport	Crumlin, Dublin	Windmill Park

==== Former clubs ====
Team	Home town/suburb	Home ground
Greystones A.F.C.	Greystones	Archfield
Belgrove F.C.	Clontarf	Whitehall Stadium

==== By alphabetical order (2025–26) ====
Team	Home town/suburb	Home county	Home ground
Arklow Town	Arklow	County Wicklow	Travers Insurances Park
Ayrfield United	Ayrfield	County Dublin	Blunden Drive
Baldoyle United	Baldoyle	County Dublin (Fingal)	Racecourse Park
Ballyfermot United	Ballyfermot	County Dublin	Coldcut
Ballymun United	Ballymun	County Dublin	Ballymun Soccer Complex
Bangor Celtic	Crumlin	County Dublin	The Transport Club
Blackrock College A.F.C.	Blackrock	County Dublin	Stradbrook
Bluebell United	Bluebell	County Dublin	Capco Park
Cherry Orchard	Cherry Orchard	County Dublin	Elmdale Park
Collinstown F.C.	Raheen & Clondalkin	County Dublin	Collinstown Park
Crumlin United	Crumlin	County Dublin	Pearse Park
Drumcondra A.F.C.	Drumcondra	County Dublin	Baskin Lane
Dublin Bus F.C.	Coldcut	County Dublin	Coldcut
Edenderry Town	Edenderry	County Offaly	Paddy Maloney Park
Enniskerry Youth Club	Enniskerry	County Wicklow	Berryfield
Finglas United	Finglas	County Dublin	Larney Park
Glebe North	Balbriggan	County Dublin	Old Market Green
Greystones United	Greystones	County Wicklow	Archfield
Hartstown Huntstown F.C.	Hartstown & Huntstown	County Dublin (Fingal)	Hartstown Park
Home Farm	Drumcondra	County Dublin	Whitehall Stadium
Inchicore Athletic	Inchicore	County Dublin	Bernard Curtis Park
Kilbarrack United	Kilbarrack	County Dublin	Greendale Road
Killester Donnycarney F.C.	Killester & Donnycarney	County Dublin	Haddon Park
Kilnamanagh A.F.C.	Kilnamanagh	County Dublin	Ned Kelly Park
Liffey Wanderers	Ringsend	County Dublin	Irishtown Stadium
Leixlip United	Leixlip	County Kildare	Leixlip Amenities Sports Centre
Lucan United	Lucan	County Dublin	O'Hanlon Park, Celbridge
Malahide United	Malahide	County Dublin (Fingal)	Gannon Park
Maynooth Town	Maynooth	County Kildare	NUI Astro Maynooth
Montpelier F.C.	Arbour Hill	County Dublin	Grangegorman Pitch
Mount Merrion	Mount Merrion	County Dublin	Oatlands College Pitch
Newtown Rangers	Tallaght	County Dublin	Farrell Park
Sacred Heart	Tallaght	County Dublin	Joe Maughan Park
Skerries Town	Skerries	County Dublin (Fingal)	Park Lane
St. Francis F.C.	Baldonnel	County Dublin	John Hyland Park
St. James's Gate F.C.	Drimnagh	County Dublin	Iveagh Grounds
St. Patrick's C.Y.F.C.	Irishtown	County Dublin	Irishtown Stadium
St. Paul’s Artane F.C.	Artane	County Dublin	Greendale Road
St. Mochta's F.C.	Porterstown & Clonsilla	County Dublin	Porterstown Road
Swords Celtic	Swords	County Dublin (Fingal)	Swords Celtic Grounds
Tolka Rovers	Glasnevin	County Dublin	Frank Cooke Park
Trinity Donaghmede F.C	Donaghmede	County Dublin	Father Collins Park
UCD (res.)	Belfield	County Dublin	UCD Bowl
Usher Celtic	Dublin quays	County Dublin	War Memorial Gardens
Wayside Celtic	Kilternan	County Dublin	Jackson Park

=== Munster Senior League ===
2024-25 Senior Premier Clubs

Team	Home town/suburb	Home ground
Avondale United	Carrigaline/Ballintemple, Cork	Avondale Park
Cobh Wanderers	Cobh, County Cork	Oldchurch Park
College Corinthians	Douglas, Cork	Corinthians Park
Douglas Hall	Douglas, Cork	Moneygourney
Leeds AFC	Ballyvolane, Cork	Leeds Park
Midleton	Midleton, County Cork	Knockgriffin Park
Ringmahon Rangers	Blackrock, Cork	Ringmahon Park
Rockmount	Whitechurch, County Cork	Rockmount Park
St. Mary's AFC	Whites Cross, Cork	St. Mary's Park
UCC	University College Cork	The Mardyke/The Farm

Source: 2024-25 Senior First Division Clubs

Team	Home town/suburb	Home ground
Bandon AFC	Bandon, County Cork	Town Park
Blarney United	Blarney	O'Shea Park
Carrigaline United	Carrigaline	Ballea Park
Castleview AFC	Cork	O'Sullivan Park
Everton AFC	Togher, Cork City	Everton Park
Lakewood Athletic	Ballincollig	Lakewood Sports and Social Club
Leeside United	Little Island, Cork	Little Island Sports Complex
Mayfield United	Mayfield	Lotamore Grounds
Riverstown	Glanmire	The Cliff
Wilton United	Wilton, Cork	Pat Bowdren Park

Source: 2024–25 Senior Second Division Clubs

Team	Home town/suburb	Home ground
Ballinhassig	Ballinhassig	Gortnaglough
Buttevant	Buttevant	Abbeyview
Carrigtwohill United	Carrigtwohill	Ballyadam
Fermoy FC	Fermoy	Carrig Park
Kanturk AFC	Kanturk	Gurteenard
Kinsale AFC	Kinsale	Madden Park
Macroom FC	Macroom	Murrayfield
Mallow United AFC	Mallow	Town Park
Park United	Mitchelstown	Brigown Park
Passage AFC	Passage West	Rockenham
Temple United	Cork	Temple Park
Youghal United	Youghal	Ardrath Park

==== Selected others ====
Team	Home town/suburb	Home county	Home ground
Tramore Athletic	Douglas	County Cork	Tramore Park

=== Ulster Senior League ===
2022–23 clubs

Team	Home town/suburb	Home ground
Bonagee United	Letterkenny	Dry Arch Park
Cockhill Celtic	Buncrana	Charlie O'Donnell Sports Grounds
Derry City Reserves	Derry	Brandywell Stadium
Finn Harps U21	Ballybofey	Finn Park
Letterkenny Rovers	Letterkenny	Leckview Park

== Junior/County leagues ==
=== Athletic Union League (Dublin) ===
Premier A teams

Team	Home town/suburb	Home ground
Baldoyle Grange United F.C.	Baldoyle	Brookstone Road
Beggsboro A.F.C.	Cabra, Dublin	Kilkiernan Road
Collinstown F.C.	Lucan, Dublin	Ballyowen Park
East Wall Bessborough F.C.	East Wall	Alfie Byrne Road
Finglas United F.C.	Finglas	Larney Park
O'Devaney Dunard F.C.	Cabra, Dublin	AUL Complex
Kilbarrack United	Kilbarrack	Greendale Open Space
Sandyhill Shangan F.C.	Ballymun	Coultry Park
St. Kevin's Boys F.C.	Santry	Shanowen Road
St. Paul's Artane F.C.	Artane, Dublin	Ribh Road/Lein Road
Sheriff Y.C.	Sheriff Street	Fairview Park, Dublin
Trinity Donaghmede F.C.	Donaghmede	Fr. Collins Park/Donaghmeade Park

=== Cork Athletic Union League ===
Murphy's Irish Stout Premier League (as of 2025)

Club	Home town/suburb	Home ground
Castleview A	Mayfield, Cork	O'Sullivan Park
City Wanderers	Bishopstown	MTU Cork City
Coachford A	Coachford	
Donoughmore Athletic	Donoughmore	Fr. Condon Memorial Field
Grattan United A		O'Neill Park
Knocknaheeny Celtic	Knocknaheeny	
UCC	Cork	The Farm
Village United	Mayfield, Cork	Silverheights Park

=== Combined Counties Football League (Midlands) ===
By alphabetical order (2025–26)

Team	Home town/suburb	Home County	Ground
Clara Town	Clara	County Offaly	Stanley O'Hara Park
Clonaslee United	Clonaslee	County Laois	
Coolraine F.C.	Durrow	County Offaly	
Monksland United	Monksland, Athlone	County Roscommon	Cushla Park
Mountmellick United	Mountmellick	County Laois	Conor Davis Park
Mullingar Athletic	Mullingar	County Westmeath	
St. Peter's F.C.	Athlone	County Westmeath	McCarthy Park
Temple Villa	Mount Temple	County Westmeath	TP Hickey Park
Tullamore Town	Tullamore	County Offaly	Leah Victoria Park
Willow Park F.C.	Athlone	County Westmeath	DPD Park

=== Donegal Junior League ===
By alphabetical order (2025–26)

Team	Home town/suburb	Ground
Bonagee United	Letterkenny	Dry Arch Park
Fanad United	Fanad	Traigh-a-Loch
Gweedore Celtic	Gweedore	An Screabán
Letterkenny Rovers	Letterkenny	Leckview Park
Keadue Rovers	Keadue	Central Park
Kildrum Tigers	St Johnston	Station Road Park
Kilmacrennan Celtic	Kilmacrennan	Letterkenny Community Centre
St Catherine's F.C.	Killybegs	Emerald Park
Swilly Rovers	Ramelton	Swilly Park
Rathmullan Celtic	Rathmullan	Flagpole Field

=== Galway & District League ===
Premier Division

Team	Home town/suburb	Ground
Athenry A.F.C.	Athenry	Moanbaun
Corrib Celtic F.C.	Corrib Park	
Corrib Rangers	Westside	Manogue Park
Colemanstown United F.C.	Colemanstown	
Galway Hibernians F.C.	Bohermore	Bohermore Football Pitch
Mervue United	Mervue	Fahy's Field
Moyne Villa	Headford	Presentation Grounds
NUI Galway	NUI Galway	Dangan
Salthill Devon	Salthill	Drom Soccer Park
Tuam Celtic	Tuam	Celtic Park

==== By alphabetical order (2024–25) ====
Team	Home town/suburb	Ground
Athenry A.F.C.	Athenry	Moanbaun
Colemanstown United	Colmanstown	
Colga F.C.	Kilcolgan / Clarinbridge	Kilcornan Lodge
Corofin United	Corofin	Western Hygiene Park
Corrib Celtic	Annaghdown	Gort Scully
Corrib Rangers	Westside	Manogue Park
Craughwell United	Craughwell	Coleman Park
Cregmore Claregalway	Cregmore	Cregmore Sportsfield
Dynamo Blues	Tuam	College Field
Galway Bohemians	Rahoon	Millar's Lane
Galway Hibernians	Bohermore	Bohermore Pitch
Knocknacarra F.C.	Knocknacarra	Cappagh Park
Loughrea Rams	Loughrea	Bushfield
C.S. MacDara	An Cheathrú Rua	Carraroe Astro
Maree Oranmore F.C.	Oranmore & Maree	Caulfield Park 4G
Merlin Woods Sports Club	Doughiska	City Park
Mervue United	Mervue	Fahy's Field
Moyne Villa	Headford	Presentation Grounds
Oughterard A.F.C.	Oughterard	Newvillage Football Park
Renmore A.F.C.	Renmore	West Park
Salthill Devon	Salthill	Drom Soccer Park
St. Bernard's United	Abbeyknockmoy	O'Donohoe Park
St. Patrick's F.C.	Caherlistrane	Sylane Grounds
Tuam Celtic	Tuam	Celtic Park
University of Galway	Galway City	Dangan Sportsground
West Coast United	Letterfrack	Diamond Hill
West United	Claddagh	South Park

=== Kerry District League ===
Premier A

As of 2025, clubs included:

Team	Home town/suburb	Ground
Ballyheigue F.C.	Ballyheigue	
Camp United	Camp, County Kerry	
Castleisland	Castleisland	Limerick Road
Classic F.C.	Tralee	
Killarney Athletic	Killarney	Woodlawn
Killarney Celtic	Killarney	
Killorglin AFC	Killorglin	
Listowel Celtic	Listowel	
Mainebank F.C.	Castlemaine	
Tralee Dynamos	Tralee	Cahermoneen Stadium

=== Kildare & District Football League ===
By alphabetical order (2025)

Team	Home town/suburb	Ground
Castle Villa	Castledermot	Mullarney Park

=== Limerick & District League ===
Premier League (as of 2023/2024 season)

Team	Home town/suburb	Ground
Aisling Annacotty	Annacotty	
Ballynanty Rovers	Ballynanty	Ballynanty Park
Carew Park	Southill/Roxboro	Carew Park
Coonagh Utd	Coonagh, Limerick	
Corbally United	Corbally, Limerick	
Fairview Rangers	Garryowen, Limerick	The Fairgreen
Geraldines	Garryowen, Limerick	Kilmurry Park
Janesboro F.C.	Janesboro, Limerick	Pearse Stadium
Mungret Regional	Mungret	Rathmale Pitch
Nenagh A.F.C.	Nenagh, County Tipperary	Brickfields
Pike Rovers	Southill, Limerick	Pike Rovers Complex
Regional United	Dooradoyle	

==== By Alphabetical Order (2024/25) ====
Team	Home town/suburb	Ground
Ballynanty Rovers	Ballynanty	Ballynanty Park
Charleville A.F.C.	Charleville, County Cork	Tim Fitzgerald Park
Geraldines	Garryowen, Limerick	Kilmurry Park
Janesboro F.C.	Janesboro, Limerick	Pearse Stadium
Nenagh A.F.C.	Nenagh, County Tipperary	Brickfields
Newport Town A.F.C.	Newport, County Tipperary	Derryleigh Park

=== Limerick Desmond League ===
Premier Division (as of 2024/2025 season)

Team	Home town/suburb	Ground
Ballingarry A.F.C.	Ballingarry, County Limerick	Astropark Ballingarry
Breska Rovers A.F.C.	Clarina, County Limerick	
Broadford United	Broadford, County Limerick	
Creeves Celtic	Newbridge, County Limerick	
Glin Rovers	Glin, County Limerick	
Newcastle West	Newcastle West	Ballygowan Park
Rathkeale A.F.C.	Rathkeale	
St. Itas	Ashford, Kileedy	

=== Mayo Association Football League ===
Super League

Team	Home town/suburb	Home ground
Ballina Town	Ballina, County Mayo	Belleek Park
Ballyglass	Ballyglass	
Ballyheane A.F.C.	Ballyhean	Pat Quigley Park
Castlebar Celtic	Castlebar	Celtic Park
Charlestown Athletic	Charlestown, County Mayo	
Conn Rangers		
Iorras Aontaithe (Erris United)	Erris Peninsula, Erris	Carn
Manulla F.C.	Manulla, Balla	Carramore
Straide & Foxford United	Foxford & Straide	Green Road
Westport United	Westport, County Mayo	United Park

By alphabetical order (2025)

Team	Home town/suburb	Ground
Achill Rovers	Achill Island	Fr. O'Brien Park
Ballina Town	Ballina	Belleek Park
Ballinrobe Town	Ballinrobe	The Green
Ballyglass F.C.	Ballyglass	Michael Keaveney Park
Ballyhaunis Town	Ballyhaunis	Station Rise
Ballyheane A.F.C.	Ballyhean	Pat Quigley Park
Castlebar Town	Castlebar	Moneen Pitch
Glenhest Rovers	Glenhest	Glenhest Sports Ground

=== North East Football League (Meath & surrounds) ===
By alphabetical order (2025–26)

Team	Home town/suburb	Home county	Ground
Duleek A.F.C.	Duleek	County Meath	The Tollstone
Monaghan United	Monaghan	County Monaghan	Gortakeegan
Parkvilla F.C.	Navan	County Meath	Claremont Stadium
Quay Celtic	Dundalk	County Louth	Clancy Park
Rock Celtic	Blackrock	County Louth	Sandy Lane
Trim Celtic	Trim	County Meath	Tully Park

=== Tipperary Southern & District League ===
By alphabetical order (2024–25)

Team	Home town/suburb	Ground
Cahir Park A.F.C.	Cahir	Cahir Park Pitch
Clonmel Celtic	Clonmel	Celtic Park
Clonmel Town	Clonmel	Dr Pat O'Callaghan Sports Complex
Peake Villa	Thurles	Tower Grounds
St. Michael's A.F.C	Tipperary Town	Cooke Park
Two-Mile Borris St. Kevin's F.C.	Two-Mile Borris	Newhill Park

=== Waterford & District Junior League ===
By alphabetical order (2025–26)

Team	Home town/suburb	Ground
Carrick United	Carrick-on-Suir, County Tipperary	Tom Drohan Park
Hibernian F.C.	Waterford	Mitchell Kennedy Park
Johnville F.C.	Waterford	St. Martin's Park
Portlaw United	Portlaw	The Paddock
Tramore A.F.C.	Tramore	Graun Park
Villa F.C.	Waterford	Connors Park

=== West Cork League ===
Premier HiSpecCars.com Premier Division

Team	Home town/suburb	Ground
Ballydehob	Ballydehob	
Bay Rovers	Kealkill	
Bunratty United	Schull	Town Park
Clonakilty AFC	Clonakilty	Inchadoney
Drinagh Rangers	Drinagh	Canon Crowley Park
Dunmanway Town	Dunmanway	Mohona
Leeside AFC	Inchigeelagh	
Riverside Athletic	Ballineen	Autograss
Togher Celtic	Dunmanway	Race Field

=== Wicklow & District Football League ===
Andy McEvoy Premier 1 As of 2025:

Team	Home town/suburb	Ground
Ashford Rovers	Ashford	Ballinalea Park
Arklow United	Arklow	Arklow Credit Union Park
Avonmore	Rathdrum	Ballygannon
Carnew FC	Carnew	
Greystones United A.F.C.	Greystones	Woodlands
Newtown United	Newtownmountkennedy	Newtown Community Sports Field
St. Anthony's	Kilcoole	Finn Park
St. Peter's	Bray	Fassaroe Community Centre
Wicklow Rovers	Wicklow	Whitegates
Wicklow Town	Wicklow	Finlay Park

== Women's association football teams ==
=== Women's National League ===
Locations of Women's National League Teams
Locations of Women's National League Teams in Dublin

Team	Home town/suburb	Stadium	2021 finish
Athlone Town	Athlone	Athlone Town Stadium	7th
Bohemians	Dublin (Phibsborough)	Dalymount Park	6th
Cork City	Cork	Turners Cross	8th
DLR Waves	Dún Laoghaire	UCD Bowl	4th
Galway	Galway	Eamonn Deacy Park	5th
Peamount United	Newcastle, County Dublin	Greenogue	2nd
Shelbourne	Dublin (Drumcondra)	Tolka Park	1st
Sligo Rovers	Sligo	The Showgrounds	NA
Treaty United	Limerick	Markets Field	9th
Wexford Youths	Crossabeg	Ferrycarrig Park	3rd

=== Timeline ===
League member Former member Future member

=== Dublin Women's Soccer League ===
==== Premier League ====
Team	Home town/suburb	Ground
Bray Wanderers	Bray	Carlisle Grounds
Dundalk	Dundalk	Oriel Park
Sporting Kilmore	Coolock	Oscar Traynor Road
Monaghan United	Monaghan	Gortakeegan
Peamount United B	Newcastle, County Dublin	Greenogue
Raheny United	Raheny	St Anne's Park
St Francis	Baldonnel, County Dublin	John Hyland Park
St Catherine's	Walkinstown/The Liberties, Dublin	Walkinstown Avenue

==== Major League ====
Team	Home town/suburb	Ground
Albion Rovers	Monasterboice	Muireachs Park
Cabinteely	Cabinteely	Kilbogget Park
Drimnagh Celtic	Drimnagh	
Eureka Kells	Kells, County Meath	Dublin Road
Lakelands	Stillorgan	
Leixlip United	Leixlip	Leixlip Amenities Centre
Peamount United C	Newcastle, County Dublin	Greenogue
Templeogue	Templeogue	

=== Mayo Women's Football League ===
Premier Division - 2025 season

Team	Home town/suburb	Home ground
Castlebar Town	Castlebar	
Conn Rangers	Drumrevagh, Ballina	Mount Falcon
Manulla F.C.	Manulla, Balla	Carramore
Straide & Foxford United	Foxford & Straide	Green Road
Swinford F.C.	Swinford	James McEvaddy Park

=== Roscommon District & Football League ===
Women's League (2024–25)

Team	Home town/suburb	Ground
Ballaghaderreen F.C.	Ballaghaderreen	Community Park
Castlerea Celtic	Castlerea	The Demesne
Kilkerrin United		
Dunmore Town AFC		
Boyle Celtic	Boyle	Celtic Park
Ballinasloe Town AFC	Ballinasloe	Curragh Park
Shiven Rovers		Killyan Community Sports Field

=== Waterford District Women & Schoolgirls League ===
WDWSL Premier League (2025)

Team	Home town/suburb	Ground
Benfica W.S.C.	Waterford	Regional Sports Centre
Dungarvan United	Dungarvan	Kilrush Park
Park Rangers	Faithlegg	
Villa F.C.	Waterford City	Ozier Park
Waterford Bohemians	Waterford City	Ben Wadding Park

=== Wexford League ===
Team	Home town/suburb	Ground
Kilkenny United W.F.C.	Kilkenny	

== See also ==
- List of association football clubs in Northern Ireland
- List of football clubs in Scotland
- List of football clubs in England
