= 2015–16 Leinster Senior Cup =

Leinster Football Association Senior Cup

Tournament details
- Country: Ireland
- Teams: 30

Final positions
- Champions: Bohemians
- Runner-up: Wexford Youths

Tournament statistics
- Matches played: 29

The 2015–16 Leinster Senior Cup, was the 115th staging of the Leinster Senior Cup association football competition.

== Preliminary round ==
Eleven junior clubs, ten junior league winners plus the FAI Junior Cup winners, were entered into this round by a draw. Byes were given to 5 of these clubs. Winners progress to the first round.

23 August 2015	Thomastown United	2 - 0	Ashford Rovers	Thomastown, Kilkenny
14:00				Stadium: United Park

29 August 2015	Sportslink Ailesbury	1 - 4	North End United	Santry, Dublin
15:00				Stadium: Sportslink Leisure Centre

30 August 2015	St. Paul's Artane	2 - 3	Naas United	Artane, Dublin
				Stadium: McAuley Park

== First round ==
The three winners from the preliminary round join the five clubs who received byes.

5 September 2015	Liffey Wanderers	2-0	Crettyard United	Ringsend, Dublin
19:00				Stadium: Ringsend Astro

6 September 2015	Naas United	1 - 2 (a.e.t.)	Willow Park	Naas, Kildare
11:00				Stadium: Naas Sports Centre

13 September 2015	Thomastown United	2 - 0	Boyne Harps	Thomastown, Kilkenny
14:00				Stadium: United Park

4 October 2015	Tallaght City	2 - 2 (a.e.t.) (1 - 3 p)	North End United	Tallaght, Dublin
13:00				Stadium: Tallaght Community School

== Second round ==
The 4 winners from the first round join the top 2 teams from the 2014–15 Athletic Union League Premier A.

28 November 2015	Sheriff Y.C.	0 - 4	Willow Park	Clontarf, Dublin
14:00				Stadium: Clontarf Astro

13 December 2015	Thomastown United	3 - 1	North End United	Thomastown, Kilkenny
14:00		Report		Stadium: United Park

10 January 2016	Collinstown	2 - 0	Liffey Wanderers	Lucan, Dublin
12:00		Report		Stadium: Ballyowen Astro

== Third round ==
The 3 winners from the second round join the top 5 teams from the 2014–15 Leinster Senior League Senior Division.

31 January 2016	Collinstown	1 - 0	Killester United	Clondalkin, Dublin
11:00				Stadium: Collinstown College

31 January 2016	Thomastown United	1 - 2	Drumcondra	Thomastown, Kilkenny
14:00				Stadium: United Park

6 February 2016	Crumlin United	4 - 3 (a.e.t.)	Willow Park	Crumlin, Dublin
19:00				Stadium: Pearse Park

10 February 2016	Tolka Rovers	0 - 1	Bluebell United	Drumcondra, Dublin
19:45				Stadium: Frank Cooke Park

== Fourth round ==
The 4 winners from the third round join the 12 Leinster teams from the League of Ireland.

5 February 2016	Shelbourne	0 - 2	Dundalk	Drumcondra, Dublin
19:45		Report	Barrett 31'; McEleney 65'	Stadium: Tolka Park; Attendance: 150; Referee: Rob Rogers

20 February 2016	Bray Wanderers	3 - 1	St Patrick's Athletic	Bray, Wicklow
19:30	Brennan 32', 54'; Kelly 65'	Report	Dennehy 29'	Stadium: Carlisle Grounds; Attendance: 250; Referee: Paul Tuite

22 February 2016	Drogheda United	0 - 3	Bohemians	Drogheda, Louth
19:45		Report	Byrne 37'; Murphy 78'; Akinade 90'	Stadium: United Park; Attendance: 150; Referee: Simon Rogers

7 March 2016	Athlone Town	1 - 2 (a.e.t.)	Wexford Youths	Athlone, Westmeath
19:45	Cassidy 85'		Molloy 82'; Furlong 110'	Stadium: Athlone Town Stadium; Attendance: 64

7 March 2016	Longford Town	2 - 1	Drumcondra	Longford, County Longford
19:45	Dillon 67'; Haverty 80'		Brophy 28'	Stadium: City Calling Stadium; Attendance: 125

8 March 2016	Crumlin United	2 - 3	UCD	Crumlin, Dublin
20:00	Hurley 0'; McCormack 0'		Kelly 0'; Watson 0'; Waters 0'	Stadium: Pearse Park

14 March 2016	Cabinteely	0 - 1 (a.e.t.)	Bluebell United	Blackrock, Dublin
19:25		Report	Zambra 104'	Stadium: Stradbrook Road

22 March 2016	Shamrock Rovers	0 - 2	Collinstown	Tallaght, Dublin
19:45			Ebbe 33', 40'	Stadium: Tallaght Stadium; Referee: Rob Rogers

== Quarter finals ==
4 April 2016	Bohemians	4 - 3	Dundalk	Phibsborough, Dublin
19:45	Murphy 31'; Byrne 69', 81', 87'	Report	O'Connor 13', 74'; Kelly 90'	Stadium: Dalymount Park; Attendance: 297; Referee: Michael O'Connor

4 April 2016	Wexford Youths	2 - 1 (a.e.t.)	Longford Town	Carlow, County Carlow
20:00	English 33'; Kenny 98'	Report	O'Sullivan 25'	Stadium: Carlow IT

26 April 2016	Collinstown	2 - 1	Bray Wanderers	Baldonnel, County Dublin
19:45	McKeever 8'; McNeill 55'	Report	Lewis 69'	Stadium: John Hyland Park

26 April 2016	UCD	4 - 3 (a.e.t.)	Bluebell United	Belfield, Dublin
19:45	O'Neill 74', 105+1'; Waters 83', 119'	Report	Russell 41'; Zambra 77', 96'	Stadium: UCD Bowl; Attendance: 50; Referee: Alan Carey

== Semi finals ==
17 May 2016	Wexford Youths	3 - 2 (a.e.t.)	Collinstown	Crossabeg, County Wexford
20:00	Molloy 57', 87', 117'		McNeill 42'; McKeever 50'	Stadium: Ferrycarrig Park

23 May 2016	UCD	0 - 1	Bohemians	University College Dublin, Belfield
19:45			Akinade 90'	Stadium: Belfield Bowl

== Final ==
29 August 2016	Bohemians	4-0	Wexford Youths	Phibsborough, Dublin
19.45	Roberto Lopes 23, 68' Kurtis Byrne 35, 69'	Report		Stadium: Dalymount Park
