= Seasiders (disambiguation) =

The Seasiders is a nickname for Blackpool F.C.

Seasiders may also refer to:

== Sports teams ==
- 1922 Hampton Seasiders football team
- BYU–Hawaii Seasiders, sports teams of Brigham Young University

=== Nicknames ===
- Aberystwyth Town F.C.
  - Aberystwyth Town Ladies F.C.
- Bangor F.C.
- Blackpool F.C. Girls & Ladies
- Bridlington Town A.F.C.
- F.C. Clacton
- Clevedon Town F.C.
- Dawlish Town A.F.C.
- Dunbar United F.C.
- Felixstowe & Walton United F.C.
- Girvan F.C.
- Laugharne RFC
- Llandudno F.C.
  - Llandudno Ladies F.C.
- Lytham F.C.
- Marske United F.C.
- New Brighton A.F.C. (New Zealand)
- Newcastle F.C.
- New Quay F.C.
- Penarth RFC
- Porthcawl Town Athletic F.C.
- Prestatyn Town F.C.
- Redcar RUFC
- Saltcoats Victoria F.C.
- Skerries Town F.C.
- Southend United F.C.
- Tenby United RFC
- Troon F.C.
- Warri Wolves F.C.
- Whitby Town F.C.

== Other uses ==
- Leyland & Chorley Seasiders, a supporters' group for Blackpool F.C.
- Yorkshire Seasiders
- Pomors (transl. Seasiders), an ethnographic group in Russia

== See also ==
- Seaside (disambiguation)
- Sea People (disambiguation)
- The Seasider, a tourist train in the South Island of New Zealand
