= Newtown Rangers AFC =

- Full name: Newtown Rangers Athletic Football Club
- Nickname: The Town
- Founded: 1957; 69 years ago
- Ground: Farrell Park, Ballymana Lane, Kiltipper, Dublin 24
- Manager: Glenn Madden
- League: Leinster Senior League
Home colours	Away colours

Newtown Rangers AFC is an Irish association football club based in Kiltipper, Tallaght, Dublin. They have two senior men's teams that play in the Leinster Senior League Senior 1A Sunday Division and Major 1 Saturday Division. They also regularly compete in the FAI Cup, the FAI Intermediate Cup, the FAI Junior Cup, the Leinster Senior Cup and the Leinster Junior Cup.

== History ==
The club was formed in Mrs Lizzie Farrell's kitchen in Newtown Park on the main road in Tallaght in 1957. The club originally played in the Athletic Union League. The highlight for the club during their early years was winning the Leinster Junior Cup in 1966. Newtown moved to the Leinster Senior League in the mid-1990s.

In 2002/03 former St Patrick's Athletic and Hall of Fame player Mark Ennis returned to the club to become first team manager. In 2003–04, the club would go on to win a treble under Ennis' stewardship - the Leinster Senior League Division 1B title, the Moore Cup and the Gilligan Cup. The club qualified for the second round of the 2009 FAI Cup and were drawn against Salthill Devon. Despite Rangers taking an early lead in Galway, they conceded three goals in the second half to end the club's participation in the competition.

In 2013, the club opened a 40 x 50 metre flood lit training astro pitch at their home ground in Farrell Park. They field two senior teams in Leinster Senior League Senior 1 Sunday & Major 1 Saturday as of the 2021/22 season. They are managed by former Newtown Rangers AFC schoolboy and Bluebell United captain Glenn Madden, brother of former Irish former professional footballer Simon Madden. In 2017, the club celebrated their 60th anniversary and published a memorial booklet looking back at 60 years of history, photos of teams and players since their formation and interviews with former players and managers. The club then qualified for the 2019 FAI Cup, losing to Avondale United in the initial round.

== Club identity ==
Newtown Rangers AFC's home kit is a blue and white hooped jersey, traditionally worn with blue shorts and blue and white hooped socks. Their away jersey for the 2021/22 season is a predominantly black jersey with grey, black and white sleeves worn with black shorts and black socks.

== Home ground ==
The club's home ground is Farrell Park. Located on Ballymana Lane, Kiltipper, the club purchased the 8 acres (3.2 ha) in 1988. They have dressing rooms and shower facilities within the clubhouse and car parking is available.

The club previously played at several different grounds including St Mary's School Greenhills Road and behind Ahearn’s Pub on the Old Bawn Road.

== Rivalries ==
Newtown Rangers AFC traditional local rivals would be Sacred Heart Firhouse Clover Football Club due to the proximity of these clubs.
