= St. Patrick's C.Y.F.C. =

- Full name: St. Patrick's Catholic Youths Football Club
- Nickname: St. Pat's
- Founded: 1936
- Ground: Irishtown Stadium; Ringsend Astro
- Chairman: Patrick Healy
- Manager: David Cassidy
- League: Leinster Senior League; Dublin & District Schoolboy League; Athletic Union League
Home colours

St. Patrick's C.Y.F.C. is an Irish association football club based in Ringsend, Dublin. Their senior team play in the Leinster Senior League Senior Division. They also regularly compete in the FAI Cup, the FAI Intermediate Cup, the FAI Junior Cup and the Leinster Senior Cup. St. Pat's also have reserve teams playing in the Leinster Senior League and enter teams in the Dublin & District Schoolboy League.

== History ==
St. Patrick's C.Y.F.C. were founded in 1936 by members of the Ringsend–based St. Patrick's branch of the Catholic Young Men's Society and, as a result, they were originally known as St. Patrick's C.Y.M.S. They adopted their current abbreviation in 1984. Members of an Edinburgh–based CYMS branch had earlier founded Hibernian F.C. Coincidentally, the Edinburgh branch was also known as St. Patrick's and early Hibs teams also played in green hoops. During the 1940s, St. Patrick's C.Y.M.S. played in the Athletic Union League and in 1945–46 won the FAI Junior Cup for the first time. In 1972–73 they were finalists again but lost to Tolka Rovers. In 1978–79 they won the FAI Junior Cup for a second time. In 1987 they also won the Leinster Junior Cup, beating local rivals Liffey Wanderers 2–1 in the final at Tolka Park. In 2011–12 they were Leinster Senior Cup finalists. In the quarter–finals they defeated Bray Wanderers 3–0 and in the semi-finals they defeated UCD 2–1, however they lost the final 1–0 to Shamrock Rovers.

The club qualified for the FAI Cup in 2014.

== Notable former players ==
=== Republic of Ireland internationals ===
- (Republic of Ireland) Mick O'Flanagan
- (Republic of Ireland) Mick Smyth

== Honours ==
- FAI Junior Cup
  - Winners: 1945–46, 1978–79: 2
  - Runners-up: 1972–73: 1
- ' Leinster Junior Cup'
  - Winners: 1987: 1
- Leinster Senior Cup
  - Runners-up: 2011–12: 1
