= Liffey Wanderers F.C. =

Irish soccer (association football) club

- Full name: Liffey Wanderers Football Club
- Nickname: Liffey's
- Founded: 1885
- Ground: Irishtown Stadium; Ringsend Astro
- Manager: Ian O’Brien
- League: Leinster Senior League
Home colours

Liffey Wanderers F.C. is an Irish soccer (association football) club based in Ringsend, Dublin. The club was known as Liffeys Pearse F.C. from 2006 to 2010. Their senior team play in the Leinster Senior League Senior Division. Wanderers also regularly compete in the FAI Cup, the FAI Intermediate Cup, the FAI Junior Cup and the Leinster Senior Cup.

== History ==
=== Foundation and early history ===
One of Ireland's oldest football clubs, Liffey Wanderers were formed in 1885 on Pearse Street (then called Great Brunswick Street). Founding members were dockworkers from Dublin Port. Writers Aileen O'Carroll and Don Bennett have described the club as being at the 'centre of the athletic tradition of the docklands' in its early years. The club was favoured by dockworkers from South Dublin leading to its clubhouse being attacked by gangs and rival fans from North Dublin. Officials and club members frequently had to carry their own goal-posts to the 'away' venues, as well as sometimes having to fight off attempts by rival club supporters to make off with them. Stewarding at football games in nineteenth-century Dublin was very often carried out by jarvies, fifty or sixty 'hard' men, who kept over-enthusiastic supporters clear of the touch-lines by means of horsewhips.

=== "Golden Era" ===
Playing in the regional Leinster Senior League, then a de facto second-tier of football in Ireland, the early years of the twentieth century would see success for the Liffey's. The club claimed the Junior Combination Cup in the 1904–05 season, and won the Empire Cup (an All-Ireland Junior Cup) three times in-a-row between 1904 and 1906. Liffey's were allowed to keep the trophy to commemorate the achievement, and today it sits in FAI headquarters on permanent display. A member of the Cup winning side in those years was future Ireland international and Barcelona manager Patrick O'Connell, then just a teenager.

=== Decline ===
The club remained a junior club in the Leinster Senior League and never stepped up to senior-level in the Irish League. The effects of World War I, the Irish War of Independence and the Irish Civil War between 1914 and 1923 were heavily felt by clubs like Liffey's as they lost many men to enlistment, recruitment and fatalities, and so the club went into hibernation. Following the partition of Ireland, Liffey's were re-established in 1924. They kept their junior status and did not join the newly established League of Ireland in 1921. Liffey's were immortalised in 1922 when Irish author James Joyce mentioned the club in his epic novel Ulysses.

Roughly around 1940, the club went dormant for a second time, only to be re-established in 1945 by former players and other aficionados of waterfront football.

The club later amalgamated with schoolboys club Pearse Rangers to become Liffeys Pearse F.C. Pearse Rangers had originally been established in the 1930s and in 1960 won the FAI Junior Cup and the AUL Division 1. Rangers later folded only to be re-formed in 1988 as a schoolboy football club. The club colours chosen for Liffeys Pearse were black and white. The earliest record of the new entity was in 2006, where they took part in Division 1 of the Leinster Senior League. The newly formed team qualified for the 2008 FAI Cup and made it to the third round of the competition where they lost 2–0 to Derry City. The following season, Liffeys Pearse won promotion to the Leinster top tier by winning the 2008–09 Division 1A. The club finished eighth in the 2009–10 Leinster Senior League Senior Division.

=== Later developments ===
In 2010, Wanderers went out of existence for a third time. They were reformed in 2013 and entered the Leinster Senior League's sixth tier. The club qualified for the 2015 FAI Cup by making it to the last four of the FAI Junior Cup. On 17 May 2015, Wanderers lifted their first FAI Junior Cup, beating Sheriff YC 2–1 in extra-time at the Aviva Stadium. In what was their first ever appearance in the Cup's final stage, Lee O'Connor and Stephen O'Callaghan both scored to bring the trophy Wanderers' way. The club also secured intermediate status the same year. Two years later, on 13 May 2017, Wanderers claimed the FAI Intermediate Cup in what was, again, their debut appearance in the competition's cup final. They won after beating Cork side Cobh Wanderers at the Aviva Stadium 5–4 in a penalty shootout after the score was tied at 2–2 at the end of extra-time. Goals from Clayton Maher and Aidan Roche and five out of six penalties scored in the shoot-out ensured the cup went to Dublin.

In May 2018, the club beat Swords Celtic to win the Leinster Senior League Senior 1 Division. Wanderers had beaten Dublin Bus earlier that month to secure a fifth straight promotion since their re-emergence in 2013, thus enabling them to play in the Leinster Senior League's Senior Sunday Division. The club announced on the same day that their original, historic club-house in City Quay would be returning to the club after many years.

Liffey Wanderers qualified for the 2021 FAI Cup, receiving a bye to the first round. Wanderers were drawn against Cobh Ramblers, who they held to a scoreless draw, before conceding two goals in extra time to lose 0–2. The following season, they were eliminated from the FAI Cup in the preliminary round by Salthill Devon. Liffey Wanderers returned to the competition in 2025 after a two-year absence and were again drawn against Salthill Devon, losing 2–1. Despite qualifying for the 2026 FAI Cup, Liffeys were knocked out in the first round by Ringmahon Rangers, losing 3–4 on penalties.

== Notable former players ==
=== Ireland internationals ===
Two Liffey Wanderers F.C. players represented Ireland at full international level.

- (Ireland) Patrick O'Connell
- (Ireland) Peter Warren

== Honours ==
- Junior Combination Cup
  - Winners: 1904–05: 1
- Empire Cup
  - Winners: 1904, 1905, 1906: 3
- FAI Intermediate Cup
  - Winners: 2016–17: 1
- FAI Junior Cup
  - Winners: 2014–15: 1
