= 2014 FAI Cup =

FAI Ford Cup

Tournament details
- Country: Republic of Ireland
- Teams: 40

Final positions
- Champions: St. Patrick's Athletic
- Runners-up: Derry City

Tournament statistics
- Matches played: 47

The 2014 FAI Senior Challenge Cup, also known as the 2014 FAI Ford Senior Cup, was the 94th season of the national football competition of the Republic of Ireland. The winners of the competition earned a spot in the first qualifying round of the 2015–16 UEFA Europa League.

A total of 40 teams competed in the 2014 competition, which commenced in March 2014. The final took place on 2 November 2014 at the Aviva Stadium in Dublin. The teams entering from the 2014 League of Ireland Premier Division and First Division received byes into the second round stage. Four non-league clubs also received byes to the second round. The remaining 12 teams entered at the first round stage. These non-league teams are composed of the sixteen clubs, which reached the fourth round of the 2013–14 FAI Intermediate Cup and the semi-finalists of the FAI Junior Cup in 2013–14.

== Teams ==
Round	Clubs remaining	Clubs involved	Winners from previous round	New entries this round	Leagues entering at this round
First round	40	16	none	16	Leinster Senior League; Munster Senior League; Ulster Senior League
Second round	32	32	8	24	League of Ireland
Third round	16	16	16	none	none
Quarter-finals	8	8	8	none	none
Semi-finals	4	4	4	none	none
Final	2	2	2	none	none

== First round ==
The first round draw was performed by FAI President Paddy McCaul and former St Patrick’s Athletic midfielder Paul Osam.

The first round featured seven ties. The seven winners, plus the six clubs who received byes, joined the nineteen League of Ireland clubs in the draw for the second round.

Byes: Ballynanty Rovers, St Mochta’s, Collinstown, Mayfield United, Sheriff YC, Cockhill Celtic.

25 April	Belgrove	1–0	Drumcondra
19:30	E. Mooney 43'	Report

25 April	Leixlip United	1–2	St. Patrick's C.Y.F.C.
19:45	G. Kelleher 28'	Report	L. Ridgeway 17'; M. Boland 56'

25 April	Malahide United	2–1	Tolka Rovers
19:45	K. Thomas 5'; S. Magden 71'	Report	A. Crowther 63' (pen.)

26 April	Avondale United	4–1	Carrigaline United
15:00		Report

27 April	Swilly Rovers	1–2	UCC
11:00	Hegarty 15'	Report	Henry 27', 85'

27 April	St Michael's	2–1	St Francis
15:00		Report

27 April	Bluebell United	2–3	Phoenix F.C.
11:00	J. Cleary 6'; G. Cooney 33'	Report	P. Ryan 38'; W. McDonald 40', 90'

== Second round ==
1 June	Mayfield United	1–3	Malahide United
14:00		Report

1 June	Collinstown	0–2	Avondale United
15:00		Report

6 June	Belgrove	0–1	Finn Harps	Frank Cooke Park, Dublin
19:30		Report	Patrick McCann 8'	Referee: Simon Rogers

6 June	Athlone Town	0–2	Longford Town	Athlone Town Stadium
19:45		Report	David O'Sullivan 77'; Mark Salmon 79' (pen.)

6 June	Cork City	6–0	St. Mochta's	Turner's Cross
19:45	Mark O'Sullivan 4'; Billy Dennehy 25'; Rob Lehane 31'; Billy Dennehy 45'; Danny Morrissey 50'; Ian Turner 76'	Report		Attendance: 677; Referee: Keith Callanan

6 June	Dundalk	3–0	Sligo Rovers	Oriel Park
19:45	David McMillan 31'; Daryl Horgan 47'; Brian Gartland 65'	Report		Attendance: 2,016; Referee: Paul Tuite

6 June	St. Patrick's C.Y.F.C.	0–3	St Patrick's Athletic	Richmond Park
19:45		Report	Conan Byrne 43'; Keith Fahey 53'; Daryl Kavanagh 87'	Attendance: 672; Referee: Robert Rogers

6 June	UCD	1–3	Galway	UCD Bowl
19:45	Robbie Creevy 68'	Report	Jason Molloy 29'; Stephen Walsh 59'; Jake Keegan 90'	Attendance: 145; Referee: David McKeon

6 June	Drogheda United	4–2	Cockhill Celtic	United Park
20:00	Declan O'Brien 1', 72', 90'; Gavin Holohan 77'	Report	Gerry Gill 20' (pen.); Gerard McLaughlin 46'	Attendance: 400; Referee: Neil Doyle

6 June	Shelbourne	1–0	Waterford United	Tolka Park
20:00	Jordan Keegan 16'	Report		Attendance: 493; Referee: Robert Harvey

6 June	Wexford Youths	1–0	Bray Wanderers	Ferrycarrig Park
	Craig Shortt 60'	Report

7 June	Sheriff Y.C.	0–4	Shamrock Rovers	Tolka Park
17:00		Report	G. McCabe 2'; C. Kilduff 6'; K. Waters 49'; É. Zayed 64'	Attendance: 759; Referee: Thomas Connolly

7 June	Limerick	1–2	Bohemians	Thomond Park
17:30	R. Gaffney 69'	Report	S. Beattie 35'; P. Kavanagh 59'	Attendance: 842; Referee: Graham Kelly

7 June	Cobh Ramblers	0–2	Derry City	St. Colman's Park
19:45		Report	B. McNamee 54'; R. Patterson 80'

8 June	Ballynanty Rovers	2–1	Phoenix F.C.	The Fairgreen
14:30		Report

8 June	UCC	0–0	St. Michael's	The Farm
15:00		Report		Referee: David Keeler

=== Replay ===
15 June	St. Michael's	4–2	UCC
15:00		Report

== Third round ==
=== Draw ===
22 August	Wexford Youths	1–2	Finn Harps	Ferrycarrig Park, Crossabeg
	Broaders 89'	Report	McMonagle 26'; Funston 73'

22 August	Cork City	2–2	Bohemians	Turners Cross, Cork
	Dennehy 71'; Murray 88'	Report	Corcoran 31', 83'	Attendance: 2197

22 August	Derry City	3–0	Malahide United	Brandywell Stadium, Derry
	McEleney 53'; Duffy 54'; Lowry 73'	Report

22 August	St Patrick's Athletic	1–1	Shelbourne	Richmond Park, Dublin
	Fagan 3'	Report	Sullivan 10'

22 August	Dundalk	2–1	Galway	Oriel Park, Dundalk
	McDermott 28'; Mountney 73'	Report	Cunningham 81'	Attendance: 1,441; Referee: Paul Tuite

22 August	Shamrock Rovers	3–0	Longford Town	Tallaght Stadium, Dublin
	O'Connor 25'; McCabe 36'; Cregg 90'	Report		Referee: Neil Doyle

23 August	St Michael's	0–0	Avondale United	Cooke Park, Tipperary
		Report		Referee: Jonathan Walsh

23 August	Ballynanty Rovers	0–4	Drogheda United	Fairgreen, Limerick
		Report	Holohan 24', 44'; Gary O'Neill 47', 75'	Referee: Kevin O'Regan

=== Replays ===
25 August	Bohemians	1–0	Cork City	Dalymount Park, Dublin
	Corcoran 39'	Report		Referee: Neil Doyle

30 August	Avondale United	2–0	St Michael's	Avondale Park, Carrigaline
	Dave Warren; Danny Long	Report

1 September	Shelbourne	0–1	St Patrick's Athletic	Tolka Park, Dublin
		Report	Conan Byrne 44'	Attendance: 1,239; Referee: Dave McKeon

== Quarter-finals ==
12 September 2014	Shamrock Rovers F.C.	0–0	Dundalk F.C.	Tallaght Stadium
19:05		Report

12 September 2014	Drogheda United F.C.	2–2	Derry City F.C.	United Park
19:45	McNally 23', 52'	Report	McBride 13'; Lowry 84'	Attendance: 952; Referee: Michael Daly

12 September 2014	St. Patrick's Athletic F.C.	3–2	Bohemians F.C.	Richmond Park
19:45	Fagan 23', 58'; Brennan 49'	Report	Pender 20'; Price 82'	Attendance: 2,158

14 September 2014	Avondale United F.C.	1–1	Finn Harps F.C.	Avondale Park
14:00	Long 77'	Report	Funston 52'	Attendance: 250

=== Replays ===
15 September 2014	Dundalk F.C.	1–2	Shamrock Rovers F.C.	Oriel Park
19:45	Hoban 41'	Report	Sheppard 81', 88'	Attendance: 2,016; Referee: David McKeon

15 September 2014	Derry City F.C.	5–0	Drogheda United F.C.	Brandywell
19:45	McEleney 6'; Patterson 60', 81', 90'; Duffy 72'	Report		Referee: T. Connolly

17 September 2014	Finn Harps F.C.	4–1	Avondale United F.C.	Finn Park
19:45	McHugh 11', 60', 65'; McNulty 38'	Report	Long 85'	Referee: Ray Matthews.

== Semi-finals ==
5 October 2014	St. Patrick's Athletic	6–1	Finn Harps F.C.	Richmond Park
13:45	Brennan 21', 65'; Hoare 37'; Byrne 44', 79'; Christy Fagan 71'	Report	Mailey 27'	Referee: D Tomney

5 October 2014	Shamrock Rovers F.C.	1–1	Derry City F.C.	Tallaght Stadium
15:55	Kelly 78'	Report	Patterson 87'	Attendance: 3,000; Referee: Neil Doyle

=== Replay ===
7 October 2014	Derry City F.C.	2–0	Shamrock Rovers F.C.	Brandywell
	Duffy 88'; Patterson 90'	Report		Referee: Paul McLaughlin

== Final ==
2 November 2014	St. Patrick's Athletic	2–0	Derry City	Aviva Stadium
15:30	Fagan 52', 90+4'	Report		Attendance: 17,038; Referee: Padraigh Sutton
