= Irishtown Stadium =

Football stadium in Dublin, Ireland

- Interactive map of Irishtown Stadium
- Former names: Shelbourne Stadium
- Address: Strand Street
- Location: Ringsend/Irishtown, Dublin; Ireland; D04 KN77
- Coordinates: 53.3403°N 6.2197°W
- Operator: Dublin City Council

Construction
- Built: 1950s
- Renovated: 2002–2004

Tenants
- Crusaders Athletic Club (2004–present); St. Patrick's C.Y.F.C. (–present); Liffey Wanderers F.C. Former; Shelbourne F.C. (–1956)

Website
- Irishtown Sports and Fitness Centre

Irishtown Stadium is a multi-purpose stadium in Ringsend/Irishtown, Dublin and part of the local authority's municipal sporting facilities. It was originally built in the 1950s as an association football stadium and was used by Shelbourne F.C. as the club's home ground. However Shelbourne only spent one season, 1955–56, playing competitive first-team matches there.

The stadium is managed by Dublin City Council and was renovated in 2004. Irishtown Stadium features a pavilion which contains a fully equipped gymnasium, an aerobics studio and meeting rooms. There are also track and field facilities, including a 400m running track and long jump pits. Association football facilities include five floodlit, all-weather five-a-side football pitches and a full-sized UEFA–standard astropitch. Its regular tenants/users include two association football clubs – St. Patrick's C.Y.F.C. and Liffey Wanderers F.C. – that play in the Leinster Senior League and Crusaders Athletic Club.

== History ==
In the 1940s, Shelbourne Football Club had their lease on the grounds at Shelbourne Park terminated. Forced to relinquish their home stadium, the club found themselves homeless and began searching for a new location. Charlie Kenny, a director at Shelbourne who lived in Ringsend Park, suggested the club attempt to lease a site near his home to build their own stadium. The site, which had recently been reclaimed from the sea by the local authority through the dumping of waste, was owned by foreshore landlords from the Pembroke and Herbert estates. The landlords agreed to lease 21 acres of the site to the club and a deal was signed on 19 November 1950. The ground was known as Shelbourne Stadium until Shelbourne left the venue in 1956.

After Crusaders Athletic Club obtained a €650,000 sport capital grant to build a new facility, they approached Dublin City Council (DCC) about building an athletics stadium on the site of Shelbourne's old stadium. By 2001, an agreement had been reached on the refurbishment of the venue. With additional funding from DCC, the Dublin Docklands Development Authority and the National Lottery, the ground was redeveloped into Irishtown Stadium at a cost of €6.5 million. Crusaders were able to move into the redeveloped stadium in 2004.

In 2018, Crusaders signed a deal to extend the stadium's clubhouse with construction work commencing the following year. In 2022, Liffey Wanderers played their FAI Cup qualifying round home tie against Salthill Devon at Irishtown Stadium. In July 2022, the extension of the stadium's clubhouse — shared by Crusaders and association football side St. Patrick's C.Y.F.C. — was completed. In July 2023, the stadium was the venue for a live broadcast of the 2023 FIFA Women's World Cup. In August 2023, the stadium hosted a last sixteen FAI Cup tie when St. Patrick's C.Y.F.C. played Wexford F.C. at home.

== Structure and facilities ==
Irishtown Stadium has a sporting pavilion, multiple all-weather five-a-side football pitches and a grass pitch encircled by a Mondo track for athletics. Events on the field can also be viewed from the building.

=== Athletics track ===
The athletics track is an eight lane, 400m synthetic running track with floodlights. Installed in 2004, the track was resurfaced in 2025 in order to restore the stadium's ability to hold competitive athletic events.

=== Five-a-side pitches ===
The stadium has five floodlit, all-weather pitches suitable for five-a-side football.

=== Pavilion and clubhouse ===
The sporting pavilion houses the stadium's changing rooms, gymnasium, aerobics studio and meeting rooms. The clubhouse for Crusaders A.C. and St. Patrick's C.Y.F.C. is located beside the pavilion. The clubhouse contains a 40m indoor track and exercise area as well as a sports massage room, ice bath and recreational space.
