= Sea People (disambiguation) =

The Sea Peoples were a group of tribes hypothesized to have attacked Egypt and other Eastern Mediterranean regions around 1200 BC.

Sea People may also refer to:

- The Sea People, accessory for the Dungeons & Dragons fantasy role-playing game
- People of the Sea, a 1993 novel in the North America's Forgotten Past series
- People of the Sea (film), a 1925 German silent drama film
- Peoples of the Sea, a reconstruction of ancient history by Immanuel Velikovsky in the Ages in Chaos series
- "Sea People", a song by Opus III from the 1992 album Mind Fruit

== See also ==
- Seasiders (disambiguation)
- Orang Laut, several seafaring ethnic groups in Singapore, Malaysia and the Riau Islands
