= Leinster Senior League (association football) =

- Founded: 1896
- Country: (Republic of Ireland) Ireland
- Region: Leinster
- Divisions: 22
- Level on pyramid: 4–13
- Domestic cup(s): Leinster Senior Cup; FAI Intermediate Cup; FAI Junior Cup
- League cup(s): Metropolitan Cup; Charlie Cahill Cup
- Current champions: Malahide United (2nd title) (2025–26)
- Most championships: Shelbourne (12 titles)
- Website: www.lsl.ie

The Leinster Senior League is an association football league organised by the Leinster Football Association. The Leinster Senior League operates 22 divisions, 12 of which are played on Saturdays, with 10 divisions played on Sundays. It also organises 17 different cup competitions. The league's Senior Division forms part of the fourth level of the Republic of Ireland football league system.

Leinster Senior League teams also compete in the Leinster Senior Cup, the FAI Cup, the FAI Intermediate Cup and the FAI Junior Cup. In recent seasons the winners of the Senior Division have also qualified to play in the League of Ireland Cup. The vast majority of its member clubs are based in the Greater Dublin Area.

== History ==
=== Foundation ===
Within a few seasons of the Leinster Football Association having been formed in 1892, the Leinster Senior League was established. Ciarán Priestley highlights a printed notice in the 4 September 2010 edition of The Irish Times. Under the headline "Leinster Football League" there is a report of "a general meeting of the league... held the other evening at 27 D'Olier Street". Priestley also lists Bohemians, Britannia, Dublin University, Leinster Nomads, Phoenix and Montpelier as participants in the first season. The Leinster Senior League website states it was established in 1896. However other sources suggest the league started a little later and was first played for in 1897–98 and that an unidentified British Army regimental team were the inaugural winners while Shelbourne were runners up.^{See Note 1}

=== Modern era ===
Ahead of the 1988–89 season, the league was reorganised with Division 1 and Division 1A replaced by the new Senior Division and Division 1 respectively.

== League pyramid ==
The Leinster Senior Football League (LSL) has four intermediate divisions – Senior, Senior 1, 1A and 1B – with promotion and relegation between them. Below this, the LSL also runs junior ranks – played on a Sunday for a club's first team, as well as Saturday divisions for a club's a second team.

As of November 2024, there is no promotion or relegation system in place between the League of Ireland (Level 1 and 2 of the national league system) and the rest of the national league system. This includes the intermediate provincial leagues (Level 4 of the system), where the Leinster Senior League is located. However, Leinster junior clubs can join the intermediate ranks via promotion from the highest junior division (Major Sunday) to the lowest intermediate division (Senior 1B).

Colour-coding key
Intermediate (levels 4–7)
Junior (levels 8–13)

Pyramid Level	League(s) / division(s)
4	Leinster Senior League; Senior Division 14 clubs – 3 relegations
5	Leinster Senior League; Senior 1 14 clubs – 3 promotions, 3 relegations
6	Leinster Senior League 1A 14 clubs – 3 promotions, 3 relegations
7	Leinster Senior League 1B 14 clubs – 3 promotions, 3 relegations
8	Leinster Senior League; Major Sunday 12 clubs – 3 promotions, 3 relegations (Note: Due to the frequency of club withdrawals at this level, actual number of promotions and relegations can vary greatly.)
9	Leinster Senior League; Major 1 Sunday 10 clubs – 3 promotions, 2 relegations
10	Leinster Senior League; Premier Sunday 10 clubs – 2 promotions, 2 relegations
11–13	Leinster Senior League Premier 1; Amateur Football League (Note: Features teams from Dublin); Athletic Union League; Carlow & District Football League; Combined Counties Football League (Note: Features teams from the Midlands and bordering counties); Drogheda Summer League; Dundalk Summer League; Kildare & District Football League; Kilkenny & District Soccer League; Leinster Football League Development League; Meath & District League; United Churches Football League (Note: Features teams from Dublin); Wexford Football League; Wicklow & District Football League; Source:

== Senior divisions ==
The senior divisions of the Leinster Senior League are played on Sundays.

Senior Sunday

Team	Home town/suburb	Home county	Home ground
Bangor Celtic	Crumlin	County Dublin	The Transport Club
Ballymun United	Ballymun	County Dublin	Ballymun Soccer Complex
Finglas United	Finglas	County Dublin	Larney Park
Inchicore Athletic	Inchicore	County Dublin	Bernard Curtis Park
Kilbarrack United	Kilbarrack	County Dublin	Greendale Road
Killester Donnycarney F.C.	Killester & Donnycarney	County Dublin	Haddon Park
Lucan United	Lucan	County Dublin	O'Hanlon Park, Celbridge
Malahide United	Malahide	County Dublin (Fingal)	Gannon Park
St. Francis F.C.	Baldonnel	County Dublin	John Hyland Park
St. Mochta's F.C.	Porterstown & Clonsilla	County Dublin (Fingal)	Porterstown Road
Tolka Rovers	Glasnevin	County Dublin	Frank Cooke Park
UCD (res.)	Belfield	County Dublin	UCD Bowl
Usher Celtic	Dublin quays	County Dublin	War Memorial Gardens
Wayside Celtic	Kilternan	County Dublin	Jackson Park

Senior 1

Team	Home town/suburb	Home county	Home ground
Arklow Town	Arklow	County Wicklow	Travers Insurances Park
Bluebell United	Bluebell	County Dublin	Capco Park
Crumlin United	Crumlin	County Dublin	Pearse Park
Edenderry Town	Edenderry	County Offaly	Paddy Maloney Park
Glebe North	Balbriggan	County Dublin (Fingal)	Old Market Green
Hartstown Huntstown F.C.	Hartstown & Huntstown	County Dublin (Fingal)	Hartstown Park
Home Farm	Drumcondra	County Dublin	Whitehall Stadium
Kilnamanagh A.F.C.	Kilnamanagh	County Dublin	Ned Kelly Park
Liffey Wanderers	Ringsend	County Dublin	Irishtown Stadium
Maynooth Town	Maynooth	County Kildare	NUI Astro Maynooth
Montpelier F.C.	Arbour Hill	County Dublin	Grangegorman Pitch
Sacred Heart	Tallaght	County Dublin	Joe Maughan Park
Skerries Town	Skerries	County Dublin (Fingal)	Park Lane
St. Patrick's C.Y.F.C.	Irishtown	County Dublin	Irishtown Stadium

Senior 1A

Team	Home town/suburb	Home ground
Ayrfield United	Ayrfield	Blunden Drive
Blackrock College A.F.C.	Blackrock	Stradbrook
Castleknock Celtic	Castleknock, Dublin	Hartstown Park Astro
Drumcondra FC	Drumcondra, Dublin	Baskin Lane
Dublin Bus FC	Ronanstown	Coldcut
Inchicore Athletic	Inchicore, Dublin	Bernard Curtis Park
Larkview Boys	Kimmage, Dublin	Whelan Park
Leixlip United	Leixlip, County Kildare	Leixlip Amenities Sports Centre
Newbridge Town	Newbridge, County Kildare	Station Road, Newbridge
Portlaoise AFC	Portlaoise, County Laois	Portlaoise AFC
St. John Bosco	Drimnagh, Dublin	Brickfield Astro
St. Kevin’s Boys	Santry, Dublin	St. Aidans School Astro
Templeogue United	Templeogue	St McDaras School
Usher Celtic	Islandbridge	War Memorial Gardens

Source: Senior 1B

Team	Home town/suburb	Home ground
Ardmore Rovers	Bray, County Wicklow	Wolfe Tone Community Centre
Ballyfermot United	Ballyfermot	Cold Cut
Drogheda Town FC	Drogheda, County Louth	Marian Park
Dublin University	Trinity College Dublin	College Park
Dunboyne AFC	Dunboyne, County Meath	Dunboyne AFC
Finglas United	Finglas	Larney Park
Hartstown Huntstown	Hartstown/Huntstown	Hartstown Park
Kilmore Celtic	Kilmore, Dublin	Oscar Traynor Centre
Leicester Celtic	Rathfarnham, Dublin	Loreto Park
Oliver Bond Celtic	Dublin 8	Grangegorman Grass
Raheny United	Raheny, Dublin	St. Anne's Park
Rush Athletic	Rush, County Dublin	St. Catherine's Park
Sheriff YC	Sheriff Street, Dublin	Clontarf All Weather Pitch
Tullamore Town	Tullamore, County Offaly	Leah Victoria Park

== Junior leagues ==
This is a selection of teams playing in the lower levels of the Leinster Senior League.

Team	Home town/suburb	Home ground
Beechwood	Milltown, Dublin	Royal Hospital, Donnybrook
Dundrum	Dundrum, Dublin	Meadowbrook Park
Drumcondra	Drumcondra, Dublin	Baskin Lane
Glenville	Palmerstown, Dublin	Palmerstown School
Manortown United	Perrystown	Greentrees Park
Phoenix F.C.	Scribblestown & Ashtown	Scribblestown Pitch
Pioneers	Dublin Airport	ALSAA Sports Complex
Stella Maris	Drumcondra, Dublin	Dublin Port Stadium
T.E.K. United	Blackrock, Dublin	Stradbrook
Terenure College A.F.C.	Terenure	Bushy Park
Transport	Crumlin, Dublin	Windmill Park

== Cup competitions ==
The Charlie Cahill Cup is contested by the top two divisions in the Leinster Senior League. The competition is named after the league’s former chairman, who stepped down in 2009, and who was also president of the Leinster Football Association (LFA) and the Football Association of Ireland (FAI) during his career as a legislator. The first Cahill Cup was held in the 1992–93 season and was won by Cherry Orchard.

The Noel Ryan Cup is contested by the top four teams from each of the league's four Intermediate divisions. Named after one of the founders of Crumlin United, the inaugural cup was held in 2010 and was won by Wayside Celtic.

The Metropolitan Cup is contested by teams in the Leinster Senior League, with the competition first held in 1906. In 1909–10, Bohemians won the cup competition for the first time. In 1919–20, St James's Gate won the competition as part of the club's quadruple. Ashtown Villa won the competition in the 1992–93 season.

== Representative team ==
A Leinster Senior League representative team competes in the FAI Intermediate Interprovincial Tournament against teams representing the Ulster Senior League, the Munster Senior League and Connacht.

== Notes ==
- ^1 This was possibly Sherwood Foresters who were the 1896-97 IFA Cup runners-up, losing to Cliftonville in the final. They were based in the Curragh, County Kildare.
