= Leyland & Chorley Seasiders =

Leyland & Chorley Seasiders is a supporters group that follows English Football League team Blackpool Football Club. Membership is open to any fan of the club who lives in Leyland, Chorley, Bamber Bridge and other surrounding areas.

The group organizes regular travel to Blackpool home and away games. It also organizes a Leyland & Chorley Seasiders Player of the Year Award, voted for by group members from the Blackpool FC squad, and presented at Blackpool FC's Annual Seasonal Awards Evening held at the club's stadium, Bloomfield Road. The winner of the 2006–07 season award was Andy Morrell.

== See also ==
- Yorkshire Seasiders
