= Terenure College A.F.C. =

- Full name: Terenure College A.F.C
- Nickname(s): The 'Nure
- Founded: 1972
- Ground: Terenure College, Dublin, Ireland
- League: Leinster Senior League
Home colours	Away colours

Terenure College A.F.C. is an Irish amateur association football club based in Terenure College, Dublin, Ireland. The club has 3 teams playing in the Leinster Senior League. This south Dublin football club draw players from the local communities of Terenure, Templeogue, and Knocklyon, spanning almost 40 years.

== History ==
On 8 December 1966, almost 107 years after the birth of Terenure College on Dublin's southside, an organised group of pupils of the college, complete with manager, formed a football team, adopted the name Springfield F.C. and played a match against a team called Madonna Y.C. The team continued to play only friendly matches as Springfield F.C., until they entered the Dublin Schoolboys Under 17 & 18 Divisions the following year. This group of Terenure College pupils are unofficially attributed to be the forefathers in forming the catalyst that produced the football club known today as Terenure College Association Football Club.

However, the true origins of the club are traced back to the College School Football Team of 1969 who won the inaugural Leinster Schools Cup Championship, only 3 years following Springfield F.C.'s inception. Subsequent to their Leinster Schools Cup win, the school team of 1969 were invited to participate in the European Schools Championships the following year, hosted in Kaiserslautern in (then) West Germany. Although this Under 18 team did not progress from the group stages of this Under 20 Tournament, they did secure the overall Fair Play Award for the efforts in the tournament.

Upon returning home and completion of the Leaving Certificate examination, the team agreed to stay together after graduating from Terenure College. They assumed the name "Collegians", and entered the Universities & Colleges League, the forerunner of the current UCD Super League. The team played on as "Collegians" until the end of the 1971/72 season, when the name was changed to Terenure College A.F.C. and they subsequently joined the Amateur League Division 2 Sunday. In their first season as Terenure College A.F.C., the pupils won the Leinster Junior Shield by beating Mellowes B.D.S. 5–2 in the final. Further success was achieved in the following season of 1973/74 by winning the Division 2 Sunday title. A feat that was repeated exactly 30 years later.

Terenure College A.F.C most recently reached the final of Leinster Senior League – Vere Deane Cup, losing 2–1 in extra time to Lucan United. Currently Terenure College A.F.C has two teams completing in Prem Saturday and Premier Sunday of the Leinster Senior League.

== Colours and crest ==
Terenure College A.F.C. play in the traditional colours of the college, purple/white/black.

== Pitch ==
Terenure College A.F.C. have had a long affiliation with Terenure College and have been playing their matches on the school grounds since their foundation in 1972. The pitch is affectionately known as "The Lake".

== Honours ==
- Leinster Senior League: 3

Division 2 2004/05
Division 2A 2000/01
Division 2 1972/73

- Leinster Junior Shield winners: 1

1973
