= Glenhest =

Village in County Mayo, Ireland

Glenhest Gleann Hoiste Gleann Oistín
- Village
- Location in Ireland
- Coordinates: 53°56′N 9°26′W
- Country: Ireland
- Province: Connacht
- County: County Mayo
- Time zone: UTC+0 (WET)
  - Summer (DST): UTC-1 (IST (WEST))

Glenhest (Irish: Gleann Hoiste or Gleann Oistín) is a small village in County Mayo, Ireland. It is located near Lough Beltra and the Nephin Mountains. The nearest town is Newport, 9 km to the south-west. Castlebar is 13 km to the south-east (22 km by road).

== Amenities ==
Glenhest has a primary (national) school, officially known as Cloondaff National School, but commonly referred to as Glenhest National School. Two teachers look after the classes from infants to sixth class.

The local Roman Catholic church is dedicated to Saint Joseph and was built in 1838.

== Demographics ==
The electoral division in which the village is located, also called Glenhest, had a population of 248 as of the 2016 census. This was an increase from the 2011 census (which recorded 235 inhabitants) and the 2006 census (228 people).

== See also ==
- List of towns and villages in Ireland
