= Yorkshire Seasiders =

Yorkshire Seasiders is an independent Supporters Group, founded in August 2003, who follow English Football League team Blackpool Football Club, specifically for any fan of the club who lives in Yorkshire.

== Background ==
Their first meeting was at the Pennine Manor Hotel, Huddersfield, in August 2003 with current membership, as at July 2007, of 40. They hold regular meetings, usually in pubs in towns throughout Yorkshire.

The basic aim of the group is to bring together Yorkshire Seasiders Player of the Year Award, voted for by Group members from the Blackpool FC squad. For the 2005–06 season, the club's goalkeeper, Lee Jones (now playing for Darlington F.C.) won the Award, which was presented at Blackpool FC's Annual Seasonal Awards Evening held at the club's stadium, Bloomfield Road. For the 2006–07 season, the winner was striker, Andy Morrell.

== See also ==
- Blackpool F.C.
- Leyland & Chorley Seasiders
