= Dundrum F.C. =

Dundrum
- Full name: Dundrum Football Club
- Founded: 1973
- Ground: Meadowbrook Leisure Centre, Meadowbrook, Dundrum, Dublin
- Chairman: Ray Bennett
- League: Leinster Senior League Non-Intermediate Division 3
- 2008 / 2009: 5th
- Website: dundrumfc.ie
Home colours	Away colours

Dundrum F.C. is an Irish association football team from Dundrum, Dublin. The senior team plays in the Leinster Senior League Non-Intermediate Division 3. The clubs underage teams play in the Dublin & District Schoolboys League and South Dublin Football League. The club also fields a Women's senior team and a Girls' U18 team.

== Ground ==
The club play their home games at Meadowbrook Park, Dundrum. It comprises two full size grass pitches and two seven-a-side pitches. A clubhouse was opened in 2004.
