= Kilbarrack United F.C. =

Irish football club

Coordinates: 53°23′7.9″N 6°9′23.5″W

- Full name: Kilbarrack United Football Club
- Founded: 1970
- Ground: Greendale Road
- Capacity: 1,000
- Chairman: Willie Dunne
- Manager: Ross Carrig
- League: LSL
- Website: www.kilbarrackunitedfc.com
Home colours

Kilbarrack United is an Irish association football club based in Kilbarrack, Dublin. The club plays at Greendale Road. Kilbarrack compete in the LSL.

The club colours are sky blue shirts, navy shorts and sky blue socks.

The club competed in the 2013 FAI Cup, making it to the last 32.

== Honours ==
- FAI Junior Cup
  - Runners-up: 2011–12, 2012–13: 2
- Polikoff Cup
  - Winners: 2017–18 1
- Major Sunday League
  - Winners: 2017–18 1
