= Ballynanty =

Neighbourhood of the city of Limerick, Ireland

Ballynanty Baile Uí Neachtain
- Suburb
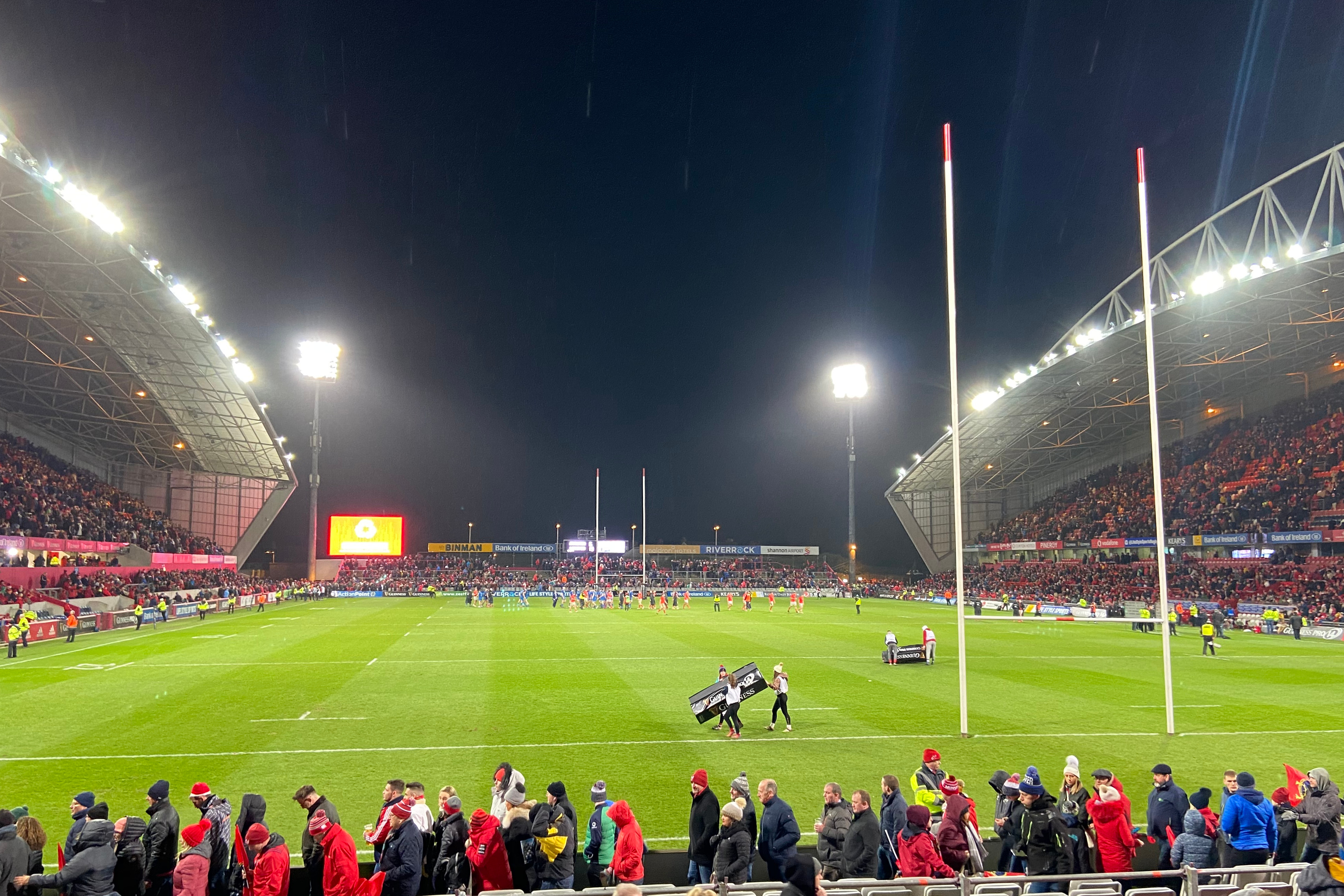
- The northern end of Thomond Park is known as the "Ballynanty End"

- Location in Ireland
- Coordinates: 52.675°N 8.64°W
- Country: Ireland
- Province: Munster
- City: Limerick

Ballynanty (Irish: Baile Uí Neachtain), or Ballynantybeg (Baile Uí Neachtain Beag), is a neighbourhood and electoral district on the north side of Limerick City, Ireland.

== Sport ==
It is home to the North Terrace of Thomond Park stadium, colloquially known as the "Ballynanty End". Ballynanty Rovers is a local association football team.

== Amenities ==
The local Roman Catholic church, St Lelia's Church, was designed by architect Andrew Devane.

The area is also home to Thomond Primary School on Moylish Road in Ballynanty. Thomond Community College (formerly St. Nessan's Community College) is located near Ballynanty, in Moylish Park.

Watch House Cross, near to Ballynanty, houses a Limerick City and County Council library branch, service station and a Tesco branch (formerly Iceland).

== People ==
John Quinn, who has resided in Ballynanty Beg since it was built in the 1950s, became the first resident to hold the Office of Mayor of Limerick City (1992–1993). He represented Ward 4 of the Limerick Electoral District which includes Ballynanty and was initially elected on a Fianna Fáil (FF) ticket in 1979 before joining the newly formed Progressive Democrats (PD) in 1985. He continued to serve on the council until 1999, when he retired from public office.

== See also ==
- List of towns and villages in the Republic of Ireland
