= Pobalscoil Iosolde =

Palmerstown Community School
- Pobalscoil Iosolde

Location
- Kennelsfort Road, Palmerstown, Dublin; Ireland; 53.3485°N 6.3769°W

Information
- Religious affiliation: catholic
- Established: 1982
- Principal: Geraldine Delaney
- Enrollment: approx. 810 (2022)
- Website: pobalscoil-iosolde.ie

Pobalscoil Iosolde (Palmerstown community school) is a secondary level school in Palmerstown, Dublin, Ireland.
