= Skerries Town F.C. =

Association football club in County Dublin

Skerries Town FC
- Full name: Skerries Town Football Club
- Nickname: The Seasiders
- Short name: Skerries Town
- Founded: 1990
- Ground: Park Lane, Skerries
- Manager: Alan Sweeney
- League: Leinster Senior League.
- Website: https://www.skerriestownfc.ie/

Skerries Town FC is an Irish association football club based in Skerries, County Dublin. The club fields senior and underage teams in regional competitions and in the Leinster Senior League. Founded in 1990, they qualified for the FAI Cup in 2003 and 2023.

== History ==
Skerries Town Football Club dates back to the early 20th century; a club operating under the name Skerries Celtic was active from 1932, with local volunteers establishing organised soccer in the town. In 1990, the modern club was established following the merger of Skerries United and Home Celtic United. The same year, a formal schoolboy section was also set up. The schoolboy programme expanded rapidly through local recruitment and coaching initiatives; by the mid-1990s, the club was fielding around 20 youth teams, and players from its ranks were selected for representative panels and national schoolboy squads.

A clubhouse was constructed and officially opened in 1997 by then-President Mary Robinson. In 2003, the Skerries Town Kids Academy was formed to provide coaching for children aged roughly five to seven in a non-competitive environment, and returning coaches strengthened the club's underage structures. The under-17 side moved into the Dublin & District Schoolboys League (DDSL) and achieved league and cup success early in its DDSL tenure. Skerries Town achieved notable cup and youth milestones in the 2000s; In 2003, the senior side recorded a shock win over Monaghan United in the FAI Cup before travelling to Dalymount Park to face Bohemians in the last 16. In 2006, the club drew a record crowd of about 300 for a Leinster Youths Cup semi-final against Shelbourne F.C., a fixture the team lost on penalties. The youth teams continued to win honours, and several players progressed to scholarships abroad and to higher-level clubs.

On the adult front, the club has competed in the Leinster Senior League and won promotion on multiple occasions. Under long-serving manager Alan Sweeney, the senior team earned several promotions and consolidated its position in regional competition, while maintaining a predominantly local squad with an average age in the mid-20s.

In the 2020s, Skerries Town FC has been pushed into a financially precarious position because of an unresolved insurance dispute over structural damage to its clubhouse. The club's engineers attribute the damage to subsidence and drainage failure, while Aviva insists defective mica blocks are to blame and therefore not covered. The stalemate has left the club unable to fund repairs, threatening closure of the clubhouse and potentially the club itself, despite appeals for mediation and political intervention. By January 2026, the structural issues were resolved and the club embarked on a fundraiser to improve facilities. In April 2026, Fingal County Council invested €1.3 million to redevelop pitches used by the club at Skerries Town Park.

== Facilities ==
The club is based at Park Lane, near Dublin Road, and fields senior men's and women's teams as well as juvenile teams for boys and girls. Membership numbers have grown substantially since the 1990s, with the club at times supporting around 750 members and operating a wide range of community and youth football programmes.
