= Sheriff Y.C. =

- Full name: Sheriff Youth Club
- Nickname: The Hoops
- Founded: 1972
- Ground: Fairview Park, Dublin; Clontarf Sports Ground
- League: Athletic Union League
Home colours

Sheriff Youth Club is an Irish association football club based in Sheriff Street, Dublin. Their senior team plays in the Athletic Union League. They have also competed in the FAI Cup, the FAI Junior Cup and the Leinster Senior Cup.

== History ==
In the 2010s Sheriff Y.C. have emerged as one of the most successful junior and amateur teams in the Republic of Ireland. Between 2009 and 2010 and 2014–15 they have won the Athletic Union League Premier A title six times. This included a five in a row sequence between 2011 and 2012 and 2014–15. During this time Sheriff were also regular winners of the two AUL league cups, the Nivea Cup and the Liddy Cup. They also won two FAI Junior Cups and two Leinster Junior Cups. In 2013 Sheriff also won the Tom Hand Memorial Cup, a new cup featuring the winners of the FAI Intermediate Cup and the winners of the FAI Junior Cup. In the final they defeated Avondale United 3–2 at Turners Cross.

In national and provincial senior cup competitions, Sheriff have also held their own. In the 2011 FAI Cup, after defeating College Corinthians and Salthill Devon in the early rounds, Sheriff faced Shelbourne in the round of sixteen. Sheriff pulled off one of the biggest shocks in recent FAI Cup history when they came from 2–0 down to defeat Shels 3–2 at Tolka Park. Allegations were later made that Shelbourne had deliberately lost the match. However it later emerged that Sheriff had fielded an ineligible player and they were subsequently expelled from the competition. Shelbourne were awarded a 3–0 victory and reinstated for the quarter-finals. They eventually reached the final. In the 2013–14 Leinster Senior Cup Sheriff were semi-finalists, losing 2–1 to Longford Town. The club qualified for the FAI Cup again in 2014. In the 2015 FAI Cup, after defeating UCD 3–1 and Athlone Town after a replay and penalties, Sheriff reached the quarter-finals but lost 3–1 to Longford Town.

== Notable players ==
Republic of Ireland women's international

- (Republic of Ireland) Olivia O'Toole

Republic of Ireland U21 international

- (Republic of Ireland) Jason McGuinness

Republic of Ireland U17 international

- (Republic of Ireland) John Lester

== Honours ==
- Athletic Union League
  - Winners: : 2009–10, 2011–12, 2012–13, 2013–14, 2014–15, 2015–16: 6
- FAI Junior Cup
  - Winners: 2011–12, 2012–13, 2015–16: 3
  - Runners-up: 2014–15: 1
- Leinster Junior Cup
  - Winners: 2012–13, 2013–14, 2015–16: 3
  - Runners-up: 2014–15: 1
- Tom Hand Memorial Cup
  - Winners: 2013: 1
