= Ringsend =

Suburb of Dublin, Ireland

Ringsend An Rinn (Irish)
- Inner suburb
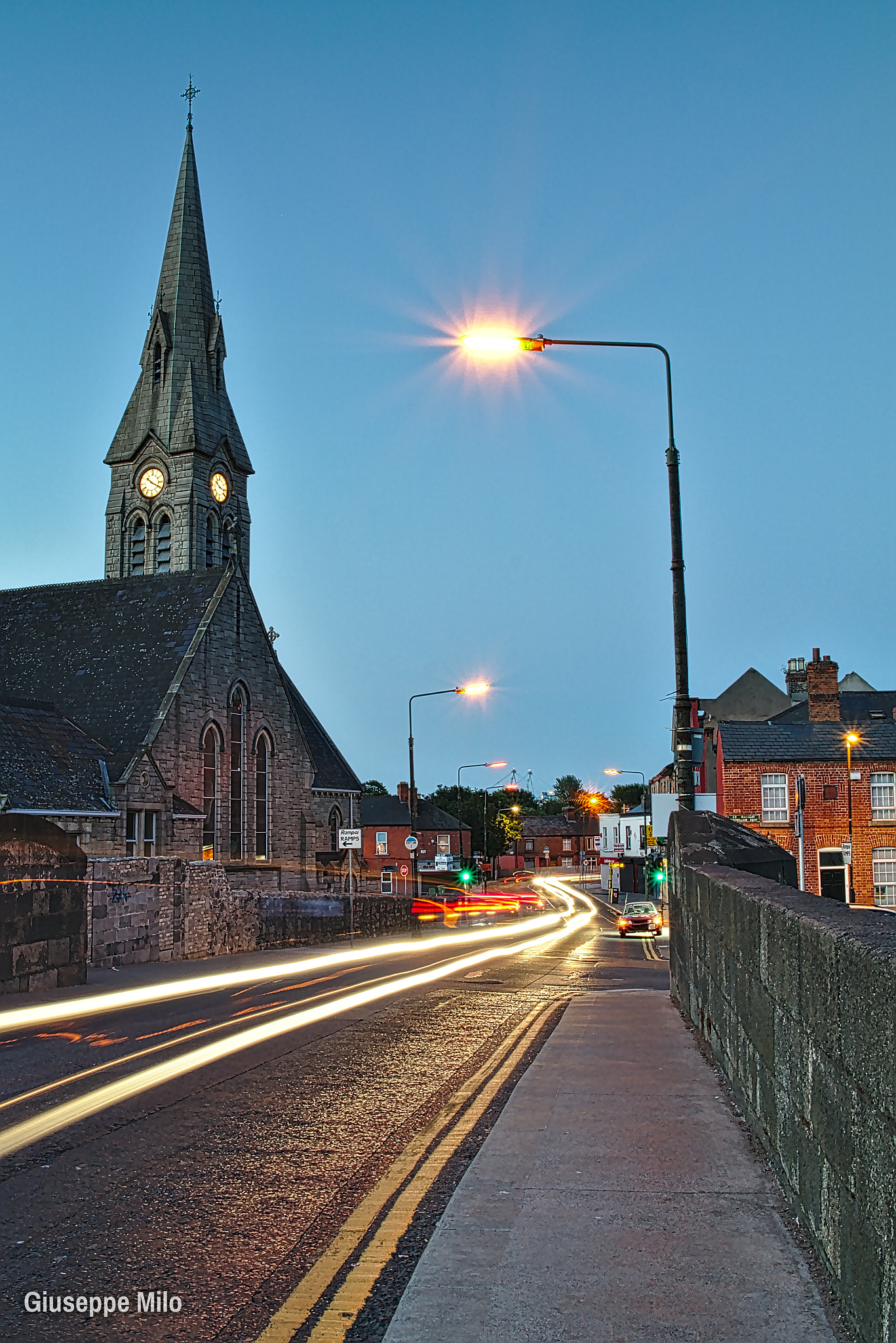
- Bridge Street in Ringsend

- Location in Ireland
- Coordinates: 53°20′31″N 6°13′35″W
- Country: Ireland
- Province: Leinster
- Local authority: Dublin City Council
- Time zone: UTC+0 (WET)
  - Summer (DST): UTC-1 (IST (WEST))
- Eircode (Routing Key): D04
- Area code: 01 (+3531)
- Irish Grid Reference: O177337

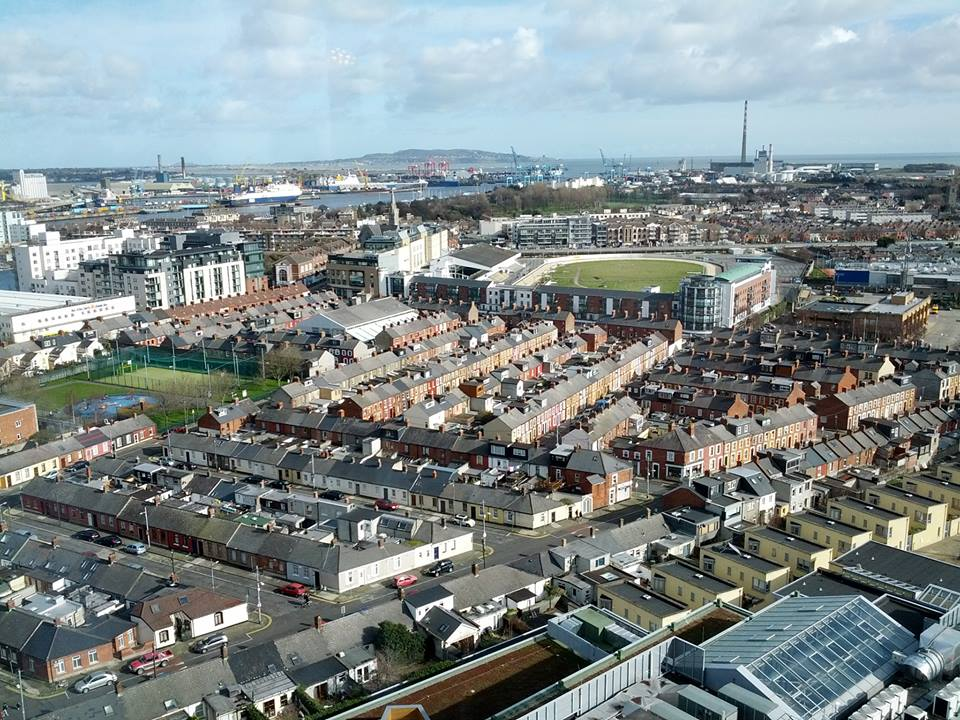
View of Ringsend with South Lotts in foreground; Shelbourne Park and out to Poolbeg can be seen.

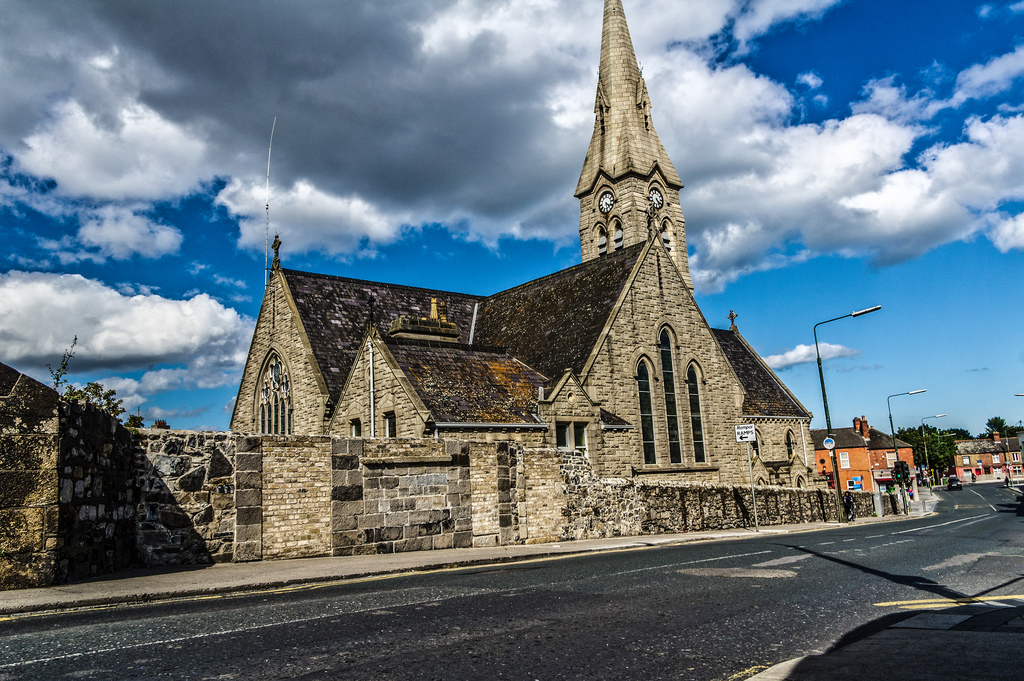
St Patrick's Church in Ringsend

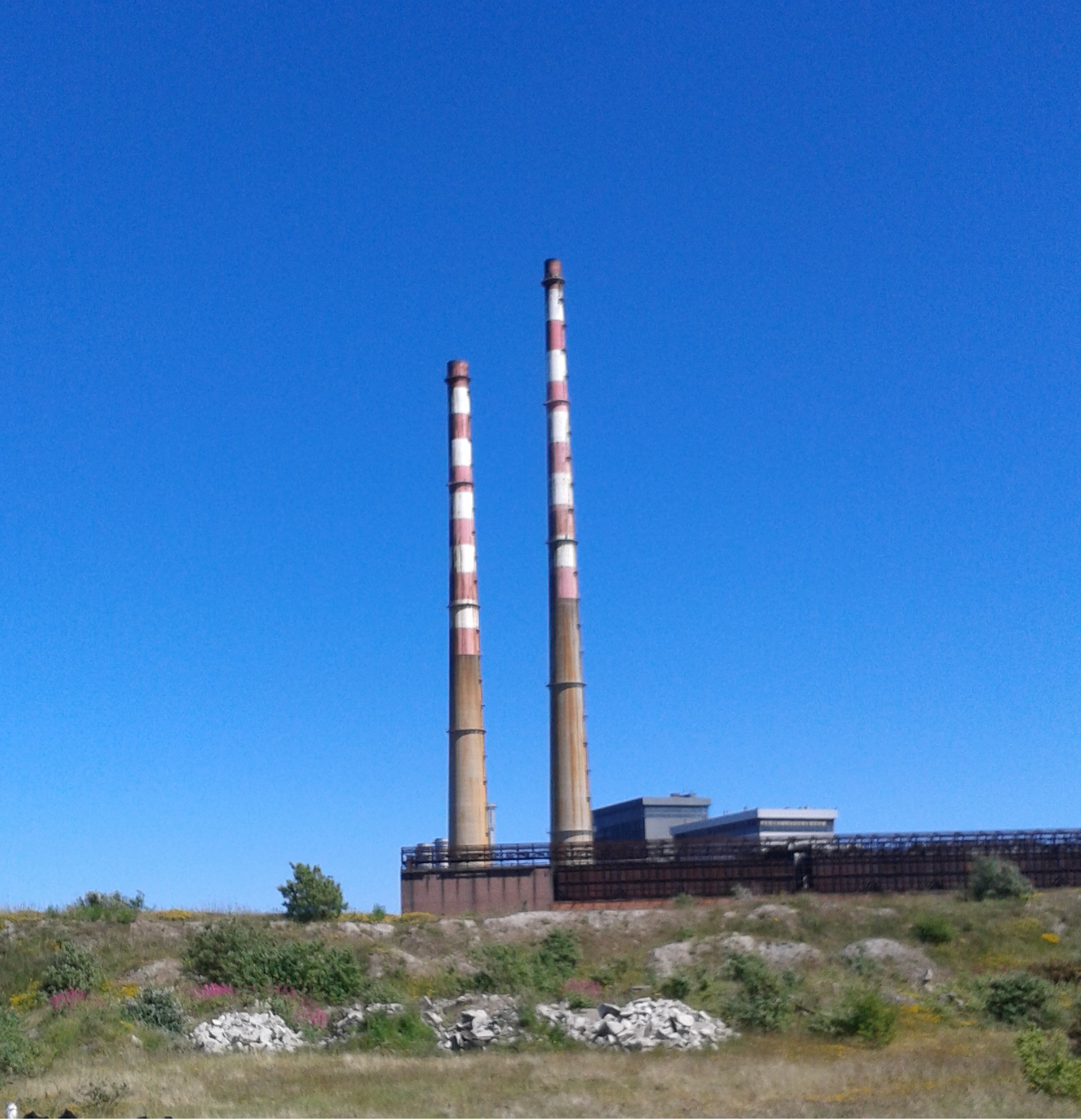
Poolbeg Chimneys. Summer's day in June 2014.

Ringsend (Irish: An Rinn) is a southside inner suburb of Dublin, Ireland. It is located on the south bank of the River Liffey and east of the River Dodder, about two kilometres east of the city centre. It is the southern terminus of the East Link Toll Bridge. Areas included in Ringsend are the south side of the Dublin Docklands, and at the west end is the area of South Lotts and part of the Grand Canal Dock area. Neighbouring areas include Irishtown, Sandymount and the Beggars Bush part of Ballsbridge to the south, and the city centre to the west. A key feature of the area is the chimneys of Poolbeg power station.

Formerly the point where ships arriving from across the Irish Sea would dock, Ringsend went into decline in the 19th and 20th centuries, when the shipping moved to other locations, although there is still some container shipping.

== Name ==
Ringsend was originally a long narrow peninsula separated from the rest of Dublin by the then much broader estuary of the River Dodder. On early maps, its name is given as 'Rin-Aun' meaning the point of the tide. Subsequently it was called "Ring's Ende" and the nearest settlements to it are given the names Merryon (Merrion) and Donny Brook. In addition to it being a centre for transportation from England, Wales and elsewhere, it was well known from early times for having a saltworks there.

Ringsend has long been known colloquially as Raytown, reflecting its history as a fishing village and popularity of the stingray fish, which is sold in local takeaways as battered ray.

== History ==
Ringsend was originally part of the parish of St Mary's, Donnybrook.

At about the same time as the River Dodder was diverted at what is now the junction of Newbridge Avenue and Lansdowne Bridge, Sandymount (formerly known as The Brickfields) came into being. The English having moved the Irish outside the city walls started referring to the area towards the Ringsend peninsula as an "Irishtown." Reclamation of Dodder estuary and Liffey areas, including the building of York and Pidgeon House Roads and the Great South Wall (South Bull Wall), and development in the 16th and 17th centuries, out to the Poolbeg Lighthouse, led to an expansion of the area.

Ringsend has traditionally been identified as a place of shipbuilders and boat builders in the 19th century who owned yards with slipways leading into the Dodder. Among the shipyards was Greg Foley's which was located next door to Ringsend Catholic Church.

=== Oliver Cromwell arrives in Ringsend ===
Oliver Cromwell arrived in Ringsend on August 15, 1649, with 4,000 horses and 8,000 foot-soldiers, and was received with acclamation by the people of Dublin.

Areas of deep water off Ringsend Point were used as staging places where goods were trans-shipped for transport by light boat from here to the city. In 1640 the first Ringsend Bridge over the Dodder was built so that Ringsend and Dublin were linked by road and goods could be transported by packhorse to the city.

It was once within the administration of Pembroke Urban District Council.

=== Ringsend during the Easter Rising ===
Boland's Mill, a once active flour mill which employed many local residents until its closure in 2001, is located in the Grand Canal Dock area; it was a location of considerable action during the Easter Rising. Local man Patrick Whelan (1893–1916) was killed in action on the third floor of Boland's Mill on 26 April 1916, during the Battle of Mount Street. Whelan House, next door to St. Patrick's Church in Ringsend, is named in Whelan's honour. It has been recorded that the most notable figure involved in the 1916 Easter Rising at Boland's Mill bakery in Ringsend was Éamon de Valera who commanded a section of the 3rd Battalion volunteers.

=== Recent times ===
Recent years have seen significant growth in the area, particularly with the Grand Canal Dock Project. A number of high-tech multinationals including Google established major offices in the area adding to the rejuvenation.

In the late 1980s, the Windmill Lane Studios moved to Ringsend and became Ringsend Road Studios, where many prominent musicians, among them U2 and The Chieftains, have recorded. U2 also rehearses and records at The Factory, nearby in Barrow Street.

Thorncastle Street and adjacent Bridge Street were used in the 1999 film Agnes Browne as the location for the market stall and church scenes beside the flat blocks. Ringsend has also been a location for a number of other notable films including In the Name of the Father, Educating Rita (Rita's home was in Ringsend) and The General.

== The Great South Wall and Poolbeg Peninsula ==
Ringsend and the southern part of Dublin Port are also home to the Great South Wall, connecting the Poolbeg Lighthouse to the mainland. The lighthouse lies at the extreme east end of the wall and was constructed in 1767. The stone wall that now stands was constructed over a period of many years and was completed in 1795. The wall and lighthouse are popular walk destinations. The area around Poolbeg also contains Dublin's main power station, with its two huge chimneys for steam – Dublin's tallest structures, the former Pigeon House Fort and a range of industrial buildings.

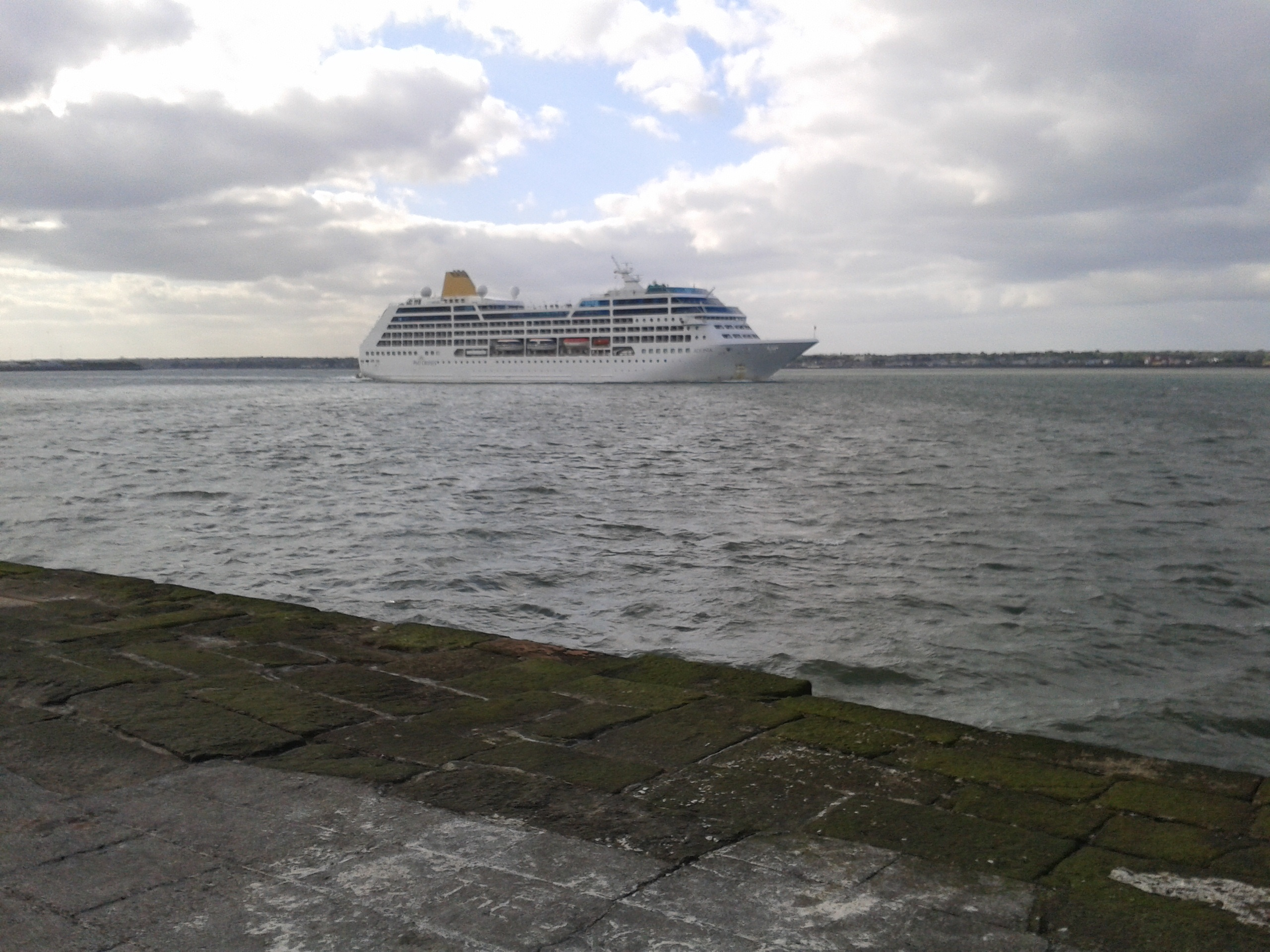
Cruise liner leaving the Dublin port

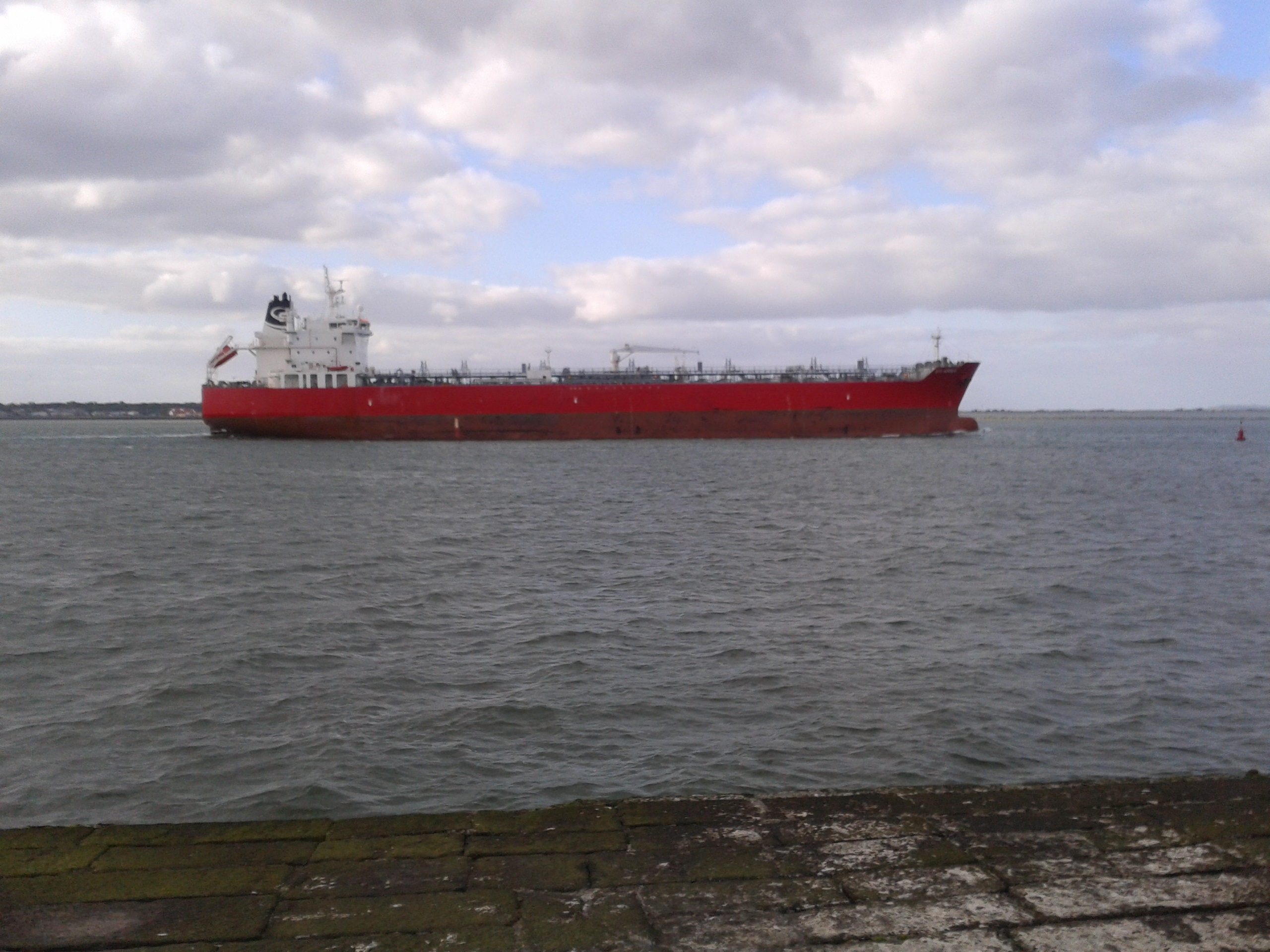
Cargo ship leaving Dublin port

South of the Poolbeg peninsula and the Great South Wall lies the sandy area known as the South Bull.

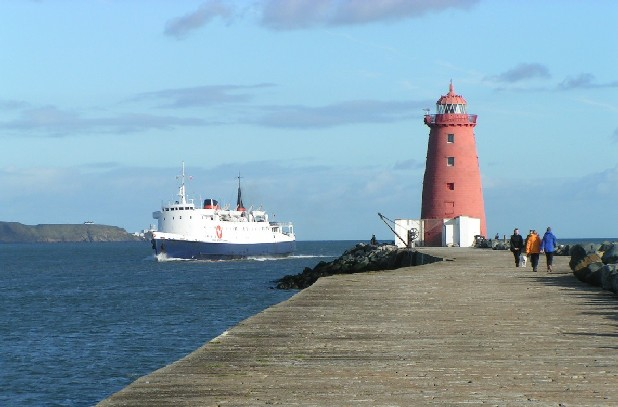
Isle of Man passenger ship, Lady of Mann, visits Dublin in 2004.

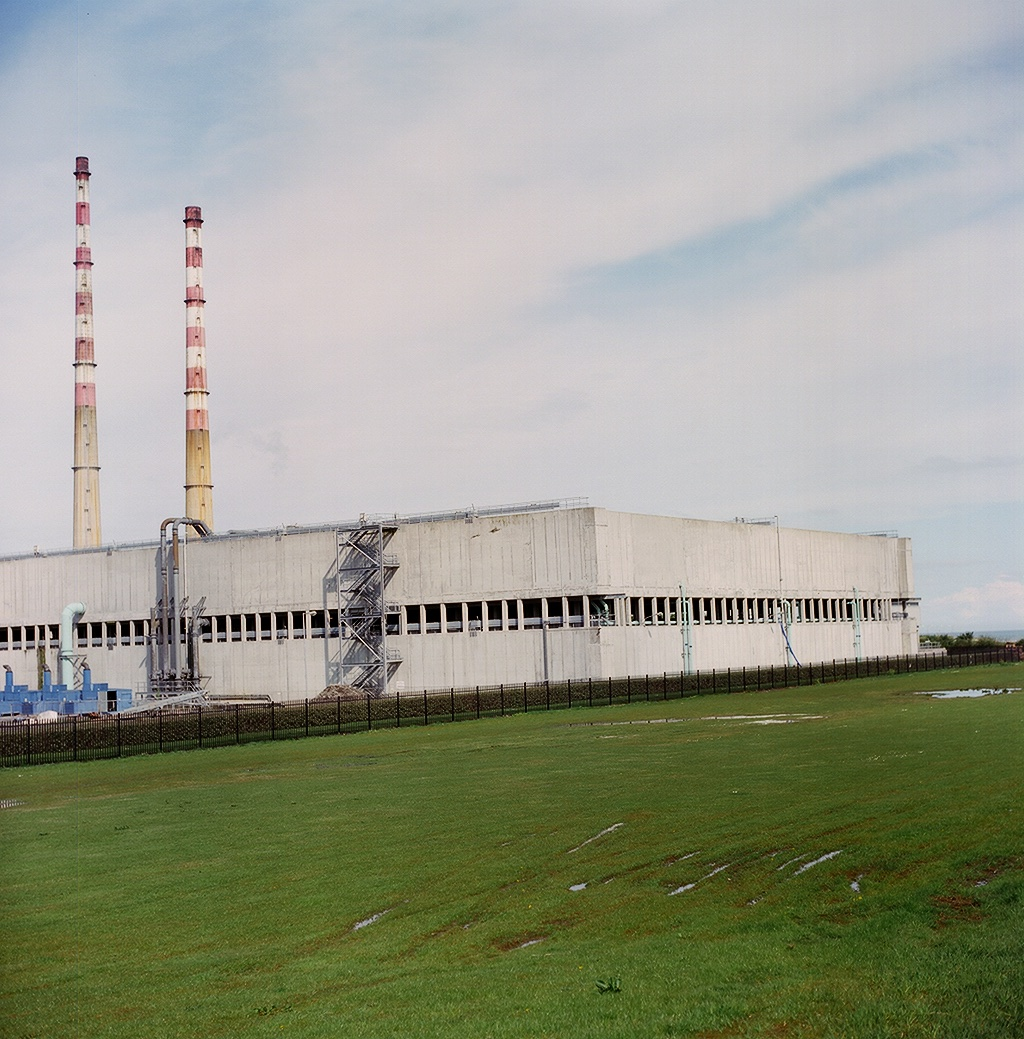
Power Station in Ringsend

=== The chimneys ===
At 207.8 metres and 207.48 metres, the Poolbeg Generating Station chimneys in Ringsend are the tallest structures in Dublin. The Poolbeg chimneys have been defunct since 2010 and were due to be dismantled, however by popular local demand the ESB decided to keep them standing.

== Amenities ==
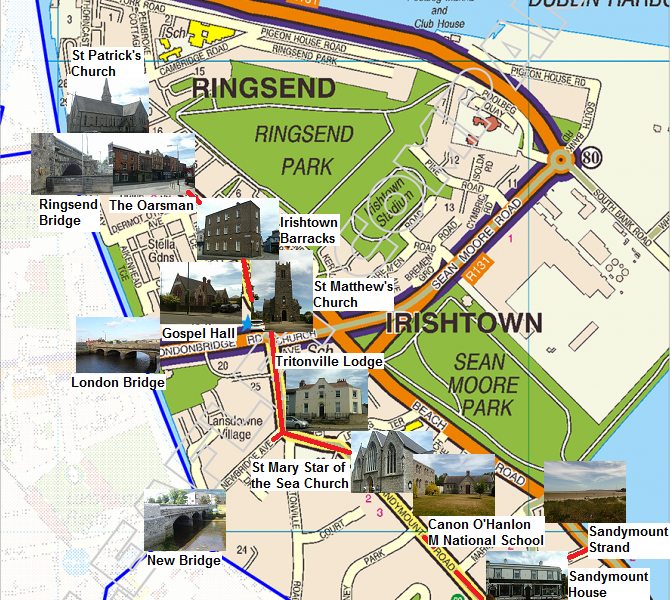
Map of Ringsend (with Irishtown & Sandymount) with notable buildings.

Ringsend has a range of shops, pubs, flats and businesses. It also has a branch of the city's public library system, a Dublin City Council recycling depot and Ringsend Park, a 10.58-hectare grassy area which contains a renovated stadium, formerly "Ringsend Stadium", now "Irishtown Stadium" in honour of the neighbouring area of Irishtown.

Ringsend College is a local Education and Training Board college. Formerly known as Ringsend Technical Institute.

Ringsend was home to one of Ireland's first Scout Groups, founded around 1908 and Ireland's first Sea Scout Group, founded in 1912. The group is called the 1st Port of Dublin (Ringsend) and meets at Focsle, its facility on Pigeon House Road, with the founder of world Scouting Baden Powell visiting Ringsend in 1915 and 1928.

== Religion ==
Ringsend is served by St. Patrick's Roman Catholic Church, on Thorncastle Street, building began in 1858 and it was opened in 1859 by Archbishop Cullen, the parish was constituted in 1905 from Sandymount. St. Mathews Church of Ireland church in Irishtown (originally built between 1704 and 1706), which is in union with Donnybrook parish and serves the Ringsend area.

There was a Methodist Chapel in Ringsend first built in 1840, a replacement chapel was built in 1904. The congregation declined and it closed in 1961. The building was demolished and redeveloped. The World War One memorial was moved to the united Methodist and presbyterian, Christ Church in Sandymount.

== Politics ==
Ringsend is part of the Dáil Éireann constituency of Dublin Bay South, and the Dublin City Council electoral area of South-East Inner City.

== Sport ==
The first major sports club was the Gaelic football team 'Isles of the Sea'. They won the All-Ireland Club competition on three successive occasions and got to keep the original trophy. After a dispute with the GAA, members of the Isles of the Sea club went on to found the association football club Shamrock Rovers. Another association football club, Shelbourne, was founded in the area in 1895. Bath Markievicz Celtic is a schoolboy club whose home pitch is in Ringsend Park. Cambridge Boys FC is a schoolboy club named after Cambridge Avenue and whose home pitch is in Ringsend Park. Liffeys Pearse FC was formed by an amalgamation of Liffey Wanderers and Pearse Rangers. The club's home pitch is in Ringsend Park. St. Patrick's C.Y.F.C. was established in 1936. The club's home pitch is at Irishtown Stadium. There is also a tradition of rowing with two clubs, St. Patrick's and Stella Maris. The Ringsend Regatta takes place twice annually, one for each club. More recently, the Poolbeg Yacht, Boat Club, & Marina has established a centre for water-based sporting activities and hosts an eighteen-race sailing series from the marina to the Dublin Bay area during the summer months each year.

The ESB Swimming Club was established in Ringsend in 1949 as a recreational club for the employees of ESB Networks and still has strong links with ESB Group. The club is now affiliated with the Swim Ireland governing body and has trained many international swimmers, including Olympic athlete Aisling Cooney. ESB Swimming Club is currently based in the SPORTSCO Complex in Dublin 4, having use of their 6-lane 25m pool.

The Clanna Gael Fontenoy GAA club are the local Gaelic football, hurling, and camogie teams.

Shelbourne Park greyhound racing stadium is also in Ringsend.

== People ==
Local residents include Colin Farrell, the actor, Paul Durcan, the poet, the rap duo Versatile and the former Minister for the Environment, Heritage and Local Government and Green Party leader, John Gormley.

Irish revolutionary and socialist James Connolly lived at South Lotts Road. In July 2023 a plaque was unveiled by the Dublin City Council at Connolly's former residence.

Sports people from the area include Jody Byrne, Jimmy Dunne, Bob Fullam, Dermot Gallagher, Val Harris, Daniel Kelly, Abbie Larkin and Fran Rooney.

Other notable people from Ringsend include Louisa Nolan (Military Medal recipient), Daniel Pollen (Prime Minister of New Zealand from 1875 to 1876).

== See also ==
- Dublin Docklands
- Grand Canal Dock
- Irishtown
- Sandymount
- South Lotts
- List of towns and villages in Ireland
