= Athletic Union League (Dublin) =

- Country: (Republic of Ireland) Ireland
- Region: County Dublin
- Divisions: 13
- Level on pyramid: 7
- Domestic cup(s): FAI Junior Cup; Leinster Senior Cup; Leinster Junior Cup; LFA Junior Shield
- League cup(s): Nivea Cup; Liddy Cup
- Current champions: Sheriff Y.C.
- Website: http://www.aul.ie/

The Athletic Union League (AUL) is an association football league featuring junior and amateur teams mainly from the Northside of Dublin with additional teams from south-east Meath. The AUL currently operates thirteen divisions. Its senior division is known as the Premier A. Teams from the AUL also compete in the FAI Junior Cup and the Leinster Senior Cup. The AUL headquarters are at the AUL Complex at Clonshaugh/Swords, County Dublin. The AUL is affiliated to both the Football Association of Ireland and the Leinster Football Association.

== History ==
=== League of Ireland clubs ===
A number of current and former and League of Ireland clubs have played in the AUL at one time of another. At the end of the 1933–34 League of Ireland season, Shelbourne were suspended by the FAI and banned from playing football for one season. After completing their ban, Shelbourne spent the 1935–36 season playing in the AUL before rejoining the League of Ireland in 1936–37. Athlone Town played in the AUL during the 1930s. Athlone were still playing in the league by the 1950s but left to become founding members of the League of Ireland B Division in 1964. Bray Wanderers played in the AUL between 1943–44 and 1954–55 before joining the Leinster Senior League. St Francis joined the AUL in 1968 before they also joined the Leinster Senior League. In more recent seasons Frankfort, who were among the founding members of the League of Ireland, also played in the AUL.

=== Relationship with LSL ===
Although there is no formal promotion and relegation relationship with the Leinster Senior League (LSL), there is a history of teams moving from the AUL to the LSL. Clubs such as Wayside Celtic, St. Patrick's C.Y.F.C., Cherry Orchard, Tolka Rovers, Killester Utd and Portmarnock have played in the AUL before switching to the LSL. Former AUL club Seaview Celtic also left the league to merge with LSL team Portmarnock. At the end of the 2013–14 season four AUL teams – Ballymun United, Corduff, CIE Ranch and Hartstown Huntstown – all switched from the AUL to the LSL.

=== 2010s ===
In the 2010s Sheriff Y.C. have emerged as one of the AUL's strongest teams. Between 2009–10 and 2014–15 they have won the Premier A title six times. This included a five in a row sequence between 2011–12 and 2014–15. During this time Sheriff were also regular winners of the two AUL league cups, the Nivea Cup and the Liddy Cup. They also won two FAI Junior Cups and two Leinster Junior Cups. In 2013 Sheriff also won the Tom Hand Memorial Cup, a new cup featuring the winners of the FAI Intermediate Cup and the winners of the FAI Junior Cup. In the final they defeated Avondale United 3–2 at Turners Cross.

The 2010s saw the loss of clubs such as St. Kevin's, Collinstown F.C. and Kilbarrack United to the Leinster Senior League. These teams all played in the 2015–16 season of the AUL Premier A.

=== Relationship with UCFL ===
In August 2024, the league announced they would combine their top division, which played games on Saturdays, with the top division of the United Churches Football League (UCFL). The newly created Premier Division consisted of 12 teams, six from the AUL and six from the UCFL, competing in a home-and-away format. Clubs remained as members of their respective leagues (either AUL or UCFL) and abided by their respective rules and regulations. The founding teams were:

AUL	UCFL
Broombridge United	Blackforge
Blanchardstown Athletic	Harding
Ely Woodlawn	Livorno Carpenterstown
Howth Celtic	Malahide United
St Columban's	ROC Celtic
Valley Park United	Shelbourne A.F.C.

In August 2025, the combined division was expanded to the second tier of both leagues; Division 1.

On 8 April 2026, the two leagues issued a joint statement announcing they would move to fully shared divisions from the 2026–27 season onwards. This change would include division structures, rulebooks and other league operations.

== League structure ==
A promotion and relegation system operates within the AUL structure itself. The league originally had a high of 14 divisions, with a Premier A, B and C plus multiple Saturday and Sunday divisions.

After the partnership with the UCFL, a new joint Saturday division was created in August 2024 which expanded to a second division in August 2025.

== Teams ==
As of the 2015–16 season, the teams contesting the league included:

Premier A teams

Team	Home town/suburb	Home ground
Baldoyle Grange United F.C.	Baldoyle	Brookstone Road
Beggsboro A.F.C.	Cabra, Dublin	Kilkiernan Road
Collinstown F.C.	Lucan, Dublin	Ballyowen Park
East Wall Bessborough F.C.	East Wall	Alfie Byrne Road
Finglas United F.C.	Finglas	Larney Park
O'Devaney Dunard F.C.	Cabra, Dublin	AUL Complex
Kilbarrack United	Kilbarrack	Greendale Open Space
Sandyhill Shangan F.C.	Ballymun	Coultry Park
St. Kevin's Boys F.C.	Santry	Shanowen Road
St. Paul's Artane F.C.	Artane, Dublin	Ribh Road/Lein Road
Sheriff Y.C.	Sheriff Street	Fairview Park, Dublin
Trinity Donaghmede F.C.	Donaghmede	Fr. Collins Park/Donaghmeade Park
