= Leinster Football Association =

Association football organization in the Irish province of Leinster

- Formation: 1892
- Headquarters: National Sports Campus
- Location(s): Abbotstown; Dublin 15; Ireland
- Region served: Leinster
- President: David Moran (as of June 2025)
- General Secretary: Peter Doyle (as of 2022)
- Parent organization: Football Association of Ireland
- Affiliations: Irish Football Association (1892–1921)
- Website: www.leinsterfa.ie

The Leinster Football Association (LFA) is the governing body for association football in the Irish province of Leinster. It is responsible for organizing the Leinster Senior Cup and the Leinster Senior League as well as numerous other leagues and cup competitions for junior and youth teams. It was founded in 1892 and is the oldest football association in what is now the Republic of Ireland.

Outside of the United Kingdom, only the national football associations of Denmark and the Netherlands are older. It was originally affiliated to the Belfast–based Irish Football Association, but following the partition of Ireland in 1921, it seceded from the IFA and subsequently played a leading role in the establishment of the Dublin–based Football Association of Ireland. It remains closely associated with the FAI and even shares a headquarters.

== History ==
=== Early years ===
The LFA was founded on 27 October 1892 at a meeting in the Wicklow Hotel on Exchequer Street, Dublin. Representatives of five football clubs – Dublin University, Bohemians, Leinster Nomads, Montpelier and St. Helen's School – attended the meeting. Rev. Canon Morley of St. Helen's School took the chair and Dudley T. Hussey of Bohemians was appointed the first honorary secretary of the association. Shortly after the LFA became affiliated to the Irish Football Association who promptly donated £50 to the new association. The LFA soon organized their own cup competition, the Leinster Senior Cup which was first played for in 1892–93. The inaugural final saw Leinster Nomads defeat Dublin University 2–1. Within a few seasons the Leinster Senior League was also established. Ciarán Priestley highlights a printed notice in the 4 September 1894 edition of The Irish Times. Under the headline "Leinster Football League" there is a report of "a general meeting of the league... held the other evening at 27 D'Olier Street". Priestley also lists Bohemians, Britannia, Dublin University, Leinster Nomads, Phoenix and Montpelier as participants in the first season. However other sources suggest the league started a little later and was first played for in 1896–97 and that an unidentified British Army regimental team where the inaugural winners while Shelbourne were runners up.

=== Split from IFA ===
Clubs affiliated to the LFA regularly competed in competitions organised by the IFA. Dublin University had competed in the Irish Cup since 1884. Bohemians and Shelbourne both won the Irish Cup and, along with Tritonville, also played in the Irish Football League. St James's Gate and UCD also won the IFA Intermediate Cup while Frankfort were finalists. Chapelizod and Shamrocks Rovers both won the IFA Junior Cup and Olympia and Jacobs were runners-up. However, during the 1900s and 1910s relations between the LFA and the IFA gradually began to deteriorate. Neal Garnham identifies four main areas that contributed to this. These included disputes over the gate money from Irish Cup games, most notably after the 1908 Irish Cup final between Bohemians and Shelbourne. There were also disagreements when it came to organizing British Home Championship games. The LFA accused the IFA of favouring Belfast over Dublin, both with the selection of players and choice of match venue for Ireland games. The LFA also favoured playing games on Sundays while the IFA were opposed to this idea. In addition the LFA were staunch advocates of amateur and junior football while in contrast the IFA was focused predominantly on the professional and senior game.

As a result of the disruption caused by the First World War and then the Irish War of Independence, the two bodies were effectively separated from 1915 onwards. The Irish Football League was suspended between 1915 and 1918 and the senior teams of both Bohemians and Shelbourne competed in the Leinster Senior League while their northern counterparts competed in the Belfast & District League. The 1919–20 and 1920–21 seasons saw a brief return to some all-Ireland competitions. However, in February 1921 an incident involving the waving of the Irish Tricolour, the flag of the Irish Republic, during an international between Ireland and France served only to push the two associations further apart. During the Irish War of Independence teams from Belfast and Dublin also grew increasingly reluctant to visit the other city. In March 1921 Shelbourne and Glenavon met in the 1920–21 Irish Cup semi-final. After a scoreless draw was played out at a neutral ground in Belfast, the replay was due to be played in Dublin. However, when the Glenavon players expressed concerns about travelling south, the IFA requested that Shelbourne return to Belfast. However Shelbourne refused and received the backing of the LFA. This episode led directly to the LFA deciding to disaffiliate from the IFA. This decision was confirmed at a meeting on 8 June 1921. In September 1921, the LFA and the new League of Ireland subsequently founded the Football Association of Ireland.

=== Modern era ===
In February 2009, the LFA sold their headquarters at 43 Parnell Square to Maurice Lyons, a solicitor and one of the founders of Mount Merrion F.C.

== Representative games ==
Within a few a years of the LFA forming, a Leinster XI began to play an Ulster XI, selected initially by the IFA and later by the County Antrim FA, in a regular series of representative matches. Ciarán Priestley identifies one of the earliest such games as taking place in Belfast on 9 December 1893. According to the Peter Byrne, these games were a valuable source of income for the early LFA. Since 1999–2000 a Leinster XI has played in an annual fixture against a Scottish Amateur Football Association XI. The winners were originally awarded the Alan R. MacKay Trophy. However, since 2014 they were awarded the Graham Harkness Memorial Trophy. A combined Leinster & Munster team finished as runners up in the 2011 UEFA Regions' Cup. They lost 2 – 1 to a team representing the Braga Football Association.

== Cup competitions ==
- Leinster Senior Cup
- LFA President's Cup
- Leinster Junior Cup
- LFA Metropolitan Cup – the league cup of the Leinster Senior League
- LFA Junior Shield (Note: For teams in "Division 3 or lower" in their respective leagues)
- LFA Over 35's Cup

== Affiliated leagues ==
As of October 2022, the leagues affiliated to the Leinster FA included:

- Leinster Senior League
  - Senior Division
- Leinster Football League
- Athletic Union League (Dublin)
- Amateur Football League (Note: Over-35s league. Features teams from Dublin, Kildare, Meath & Louth.)
- Carlow & District Football League
- Combined Counties Football League (Note: Features teams from the Midlands and bordering counties)
- Kildare & District Football League
- Kilkenny & District Soccer League
- North East Football League
- UCD Super League
- United Churches Football League (Note: Features teams from Dublin)
- Wexford Football League
- Wicklow & District Football League

Women's

- Eastern Women's Football League
- Wexford and District Women's League

Youth

- Dublin and District Schoolboys'/Girls' League (DDSL) {7–18 years old}
- North Dublin Schoolboys/girls League (NDSL) {7–19 years old}

=== Former affiliates ===
Former affiliated leagues include:

- Dundalk & District Junior League (also known as the Dundalk Summer League)
- Kildare Underage League
- North Louth League

== See also ==
- Irish Universities Football Union
- Connacht Football Association
- Munster Football Association
- Women's Football Association of Ireland
- Galway Football Association
