= 2020 Munster Senior League =

Munster Senior League
- Season: 2020-21

Munster Senior League is an independent football league formed in Cork, Ireland in 1922-23, and now affiliated with the Munster Football Association, Football Association of Ireland, UEFA and FIFA.

== Premier Division ==
Pos	Team	Pld	W	D	L	SF	SA	Diff	Pts	Qualification or Relegation
1	Ringmahon Rangers	1	1	0	0	5	0	+5	3	Champions
2	Avondale United	1	1	0	0	2	1	+1	3	
3	Carrigaline United	1	1	0	0	1	0	+1	3	
4	College Corinthians	1	1	0	0	1	0	+1	3	
5	Cobh Wanderers	0	0	0	0	0	0	+0	0	
6	UCC	0	0	0	0	0	0	+0	0	
7	Midleton	1	0	0	1	1	2	-1	0	
8	Douglas Hall	1	0	0	1	0	1	-1	0	
9	Rockmount	1	0	0	1	0	1	-1	0	Relegation to First Division
10	St Marys	1	0	0	1	0	5	-5	0	Relegation to First Division

== First Division ==
Pos	Team	Pld	W	D	L	SF	SA	Diff	Pts	Qualification or Relegation
1	Everton	1	1	0	0	7	0	+7	3	Promotion to Premier Division
2	Castleview	1	1	0	0	6	1	+5	3	Promotion to Premier Division
3	Blarney United	1	1	0	0	3	1	+2	3	
4	Leeds	1	0	1	0	3	3	+0	1	
5	Bandon	1	0	1	0	3	3	+0	1	
6	Mayfield United	1	0	1	0	2	2	+0	1	
7	Kinsale	1	0	1	0	2	2	+0	1	
8	Ballinhassig	1	0	0	1	1	3	-2	0	
9	Leeside	1	0	0	1	1	6	-5	0	Relegation to Second Division
10	Park United	1	0	0	1	0	7	-7	0	Relegation to Second Division

== Second Division ==
Pos	Team	Pld	W	D	L	SF	SA	Diff	Pts	Qualification or Relegation
1	Riverstown	1	1	0	0	6	2	+4	3	Promotion to First Division
2	Wilton United	1	1	0	0	4	0	+4	3	Promotion to First Division
3	Tramore Athletic	1	1	0	0	4	1	+3	3	Qualification to Promotion Play-offs
4	Innishvilla	1	1	0	0	2	0	+2	3	Qualification to Promotion Play-offs
5	Lakewood Athletic	1	1	0	0	2	1	+1	3	Qualification to Promotion Play-offs
6	Macroom	1	1	0	0	1	0	+1	3	Qualification to Promotion Play-offs
7	Kilworth Celtic	0	0	0	0	0	0	+0	0	
8	Pearse Celtic	1	0	0	1	1	2	-1	0	
9	Casement Celtic	1	0	0	1	0	1	-1	0	
10	Carrigtwohill United	1	0	0	1	0	2	-2	0	
11	Fermoy	1	0	0	1	1	4	-3	0	
12	Youghal United	1	0	0	1	2	6	-4	0	
13	Buttevant	1	0	0	1	0	4	-4	0	

Play-Offs

Play-Off Semi-Finals
3rd placed team
6th placed team
4th placed team
5th placed team

Play-Off Final
