= 2011–12 FAI Intermediate Cup =

Tournament details
- Country: Ireland
- Teams: 94

Final positions
- Champions: Avondale United
- Runners-up: Cherry Orchard

Tournament statistics
- Matches played: 103

The 2011–12 FAI Umbro Intermediate Cup was the 85th season of the tournament's existence. 94 clubs competed to win the title, and it was Avondale United who were the victors after they beat Cherry Orchard 2–1 for the second successive season in the final after extra time in Tallaght Stadium to gain their fifth Intermediate Cup title. The 16 teams that reached the fourth round qualified for the 2012 FAI Cup.

== First round ==
Intermediate teams from the Leinster Senior League, Munster Senior League and Ulster Senior League enter at this stage. In this round teams from the Leinster Senior League play each other, teams from the Munster Senior League play each other, and teams from the Ulster Senior League play each other. The draw was made on 16 September 2011 with ties to be played on the weekend of 9 October 2011.

=== Ulster ===
9 October 2011	Drumkeen United	12–0	Killea	Drumkeen

9 October 2011	Cockhill Celtic	6–1	Swilly Rovers	Charlie O'Donnell Sports Grounds

9 October 2011	Buncrana Hearts	0–2	Kildrum Tigers	Castle Park, Buncrana

Byes

- Bonagee United
- Fanad United
- Letterkenny Rovers

=== Munster ===
9 October 2011	Bandon	2–4 (a.e.t.)	Blarney United	Town Park, Bandon.

9 October 2011	Lakewood Athletic	scr − w/o	Avondale United

9 October 2011	Mayfield United	4–0	Midleton	Mayfield Park

9 October 2011	College Corinthians	3–2	Crosshaven	Corinthians Park

9 October 2011	UCC	6–0	Passage	The Farm

9 October 2011	Castleview	2–2 (a.e.t.) (5–6 p)	Cork Institute of Technology	O'Sullivan Park

9 October 2011	Everton A.F.C.	2–1	Rockmount	Everton Park

Byes

- Ballincollig A.F.C.
- Ballinhassig A.F.C.
- Carrigaline United A.F.C.
- Cobh Wanderers
- Crofton Celtic F.C.
- Douglas Hall A.F.C.
- Fermoy A.F.C.
- Glasheen F.C.
- Leeds A.F.C.
- Mallow United
- Ringmahon Rangers F.C.
- St. Mary's
- Temple United F.C.
- Tramore Athletic
- Youghal United F.C.

=== Leinster ===
9 October 2011	Kilnamanagh A.F.C.	0–7	Tolka Rovers	Treepark Road

9 October 2011	Firhouse Clover F.C.	3–2	Bluebell United	Tallaght I.T.

9 October 2011	Lucan United F.C.	3–0	TEK United F.C.	Airlie Heights, Lucan

9 October 2011	Tymon Celtic F.C.	2–1	Sacred Heart F.C.	Tymonville Open Space

9 October 2011	Garda	2–5	Pegasus F.C.	St. Raphael's Park

9 October 2011	St. Joseph's Glasthule	3–2	Drumcondra	Tivoli Terrace South

9 October 2011	Whitehall Rangers A.F.C.	4–2	Ballyoulster United F.C.	Paddy Mahony Park

9 October 2011	Phoenix F.C. Navan Road	2–0	Newtown Rangers	Martin Savage Park

9 October 2011	Arklow Town	1–2	Mount Merrion YMCA	Lamberton

9 October 2011	Lissadel United	5–2	St. Francis	Pearse Park, Crumlin

9 October 2011	St. Joseph's Seniors	2–1	Beggsboro	Pearse Park, Sallynoggin

9 October 2011	Dublin Bus	1–4	Killester United	Cloverhill Road

9 October 2011	Confey	2–5	Portmarnock	St Catherine's Park, Leixlip

9 October 2011	Glenville	1–0	Drogheda Town	Oakcourt Avenue, Palmerstown

9 October 2011	CYM Terenure	1–2 (a.e.t.)	Verona	CYM Sports Club

9 October 2011	Templeogue United	0–4	Cherry Orchard	Tymon Park

9 October 2011	Parkvilla	2–3	Celbridge Town	Claremont Stadium, Navan

9 October 2011	Belgrove	6–0	St. James's Gate	St. Paul's College

9 October 2011	Broadford Rovers	0–2	Malahide United	Stonemasons Way, Ballinteer

9 October 2011	Glebe North	0–1	Dunboyne	Market Green, Balbriggan

Byes

- Ballyfermot United
- Bangor Celtic
- Crumlin United
- Edenderry Town
- Glenmore Dundrum
- Greystones
- Leixlip United
- Newbridge Town
- Peamount Moyle Park
- Postal United
- Rathcoole Boys
- St. Mochta's
- St. Patrick's C.Y.
- Skerries Town
- UCD Reserves
- Wayside Celtic

== Second round ==
The draw was made on 12 October 2011 with ties to be played on the weekend of 30 October 2011. In this round teams from the Leinster Senior League play each other, teams from the Munster Senior League play each other, and teams from the Ulster Senior League play each other.

=== Ulster ===
30 October 2011	Cockhill Celtic	1–1 (2–3 Pens)	Kildrum Tigers	Charlie O'Donnell Sports Grounds

30 October 2011	Letterkenny Rovers	4–0	Fanad United	Leckview Park

30 October 2011	Bonagee United	1–7	Drumkeen United	Dry Arch Park

Munster

30 October 2011	College Corinthians	4–1	Cork Institute of Technology	Corinthians Park

30 October 2011	Avondale United	3–1	Leeds	Avondale Park

30 October 2011	Blarney United	4–3 AET	UCC	O'Shea Park

30 October 2011	Cobh Wanderers	3–1	Tramore Athletic	Old Church Park

30 October 2011	Carrigaline United	3–0	St. Mary's	Ballea Park

30 October 2011	Ringmahon Rangers	1–3	Douglas Hall	Ringmahon Park

30 October 2011	Mayfield United	4–1	Temple United	Mayfield Park

30 October 2011	Youghal United	0–0 (5–3 Pens)	Temple United	Adrath Park

30 October 2011	Ballinhassig	2–6	Everton	Gortnalougha

30 October 2011	Mallow United	3–3 (2–4 Pens)	Crofton Celtic	Town Park

30 October 2011	Glasheen	4–2	Ballincollig	Glasheen Park

=== Leinster ===
30 October 2011	Tymon Celtic	3–4	Tolka Rovers	Tymonville Open Space

30 October 2011	Lucan United	1–0	Lissadel United	Airlie Heights, Lucan

30 October 2011	Skerries Town	2–4	Rathcoole Boys	Park Lane

30 October 2011	Whitehall Rangers	2–2 (2–4 Pens)	Ballyfermot United	Paddy Mahony Park

30 October 2011	St. Mochta's	1–2	Firhouse Clover	Porterstown Road

30 October 2011	Bangor Celtic	0–1	Crumlin United	Nutgrove NS Grounds

30 October 2011	Verona	3–1	Leixlip United	Verona Sports and Leisure Club, Blanchardstown

30 October 2011	Edenderry Town	2–4	UCD Reserves	Fr Paul Park

30 October 2011	Greystones	3–2	Portmarnock	Archfield

30 October 2011	St. Joseph's Glasthule	0–4	Belgrove	Tivoli Terrace South

30 October 2011	Glenmore Dundrum	3–5	Mount Merrion YMCA	Moreen Park

30 October 2011	Glenville	1–3	Cherry Orchard	Oakcourt Avenue, Palmerstown

30 October 2011	Phoenix F.C. Navan Road	1–0	St. Joseph's Boys	Martin Savage Park

30 October 2011	Killester United	0–0 (4–3 Pens)	Newbridge Town	Hadden Park

30 October 2011	Pegasus	3–4 AET	Wayside Celtic	Belfield

30 October 2011	Postal United	2–3	Dunboyne	Andy Moore Park

30 October 2011	Malahide United	2–0	Celbridge Town	Gannon Park

30 October 2011	St. Patrick's C.Y.	4–2	Peamount Moyle Park	Irishtown Stadium

== Third round ==
The draw was made on 2 November 2011 with ties to be played on the weekend of 4 December 2011. In this round teams from the Leinster Senior League, Munster Senior League, Ulster Senior League play each other. The 16 winners of the Third Round ties will progress to the Fourth Round and also qualify for the 2012 FAI Cup.

4 December 2011	Douglas Hall	1–0	Glasheen	Pigeon Hill

4 December 2011	Ballyfermot United	0–3	Crumlin United	Blackditch Road

4 December 2011	Tolka Rovers	2–3	St. Patrick's C.Y.	Frank Cooke Park

4 December 2011	Crofton Celtic	1–2	Verona	CIT

4 December 2011	Mayfield United	2–1	UCD Reserves	Mayfield Park

16 December 2011	Youghal United	0–2	Avondale United	Adrath Park

4 December 2011	Wayside Celtic	1–4	Killester United	Jackson Park

4 December 2011	College Corinthians	2–0	Letterkenny Rovers	Corinthians Park

4 December 2011	Phoenix F.C. Navan Road	1–1	Firhouse Clover	Martin Savage Park

7 January 2012 Replay	Firhouse Clover	3–4	Phoenix F.C. Navan Road	Tallaght I.T.

4 December 2011	Cobh Wanderers	1–2	Lucan United	Oldchurch Park

4 December 2011	Mount Merrion YMCA	1–2	Cherry Orchard	MM Grounds, Glenabbey Road

4 December 2011	Dunboyne	0–0	Kildrum Tigers	Summerhill Road, Dunboyne

18 December 2011 Replay	Kildrum Tigers	2–1	Dunboyne	Station Road Park

4 December 2011	Rathcoole Boys	1–1	Everton	Frank Cox Park

18 December 2011 Replay	Everton	3–0	Rathcoole Boys	Everton Park

4 December 2011	Malahide United	1–1	Belgrove	Gannon Park

18 December 2011 Replay	Belgrove	0–6	Malahide United	St. Paul's College

4 December 2011	Drumkeen United	3–1	Carrigaline United	Drumkeen

4 December 2011	Greystones	2–2	Blarney United	Archfield

18 December 2011 Replay	Blarney United	1–0	Greystones	O'Shea Park

== Fourth round ==
The draw was made on 6 December 2011 at FAI Headquarters, Abbotstown by the FAI Domestic Committee. Ties are to be played on the weekend of 29 January 2012.

29 January 2012	Drumkeen United	0–2	Verona	Drumkeen

29 January 2012	Phoenix F.C. Navan Road	1–1	Lucan United	Martin Savage Park

12 February 2012 Replay	Lucan United	2–3 (a.e.t.)	Phoenix F.C. Navan Road	Airlie Heights, Lucan

29 January 2012	Malahide United	3–1	Douglas Hall	Gannon Park

29 January 2012	Cherry Orchard	2–0	Mayfield United	Le Fanu Park

12 February 2012	Killester United	0–0	Crumlin United	Hadden Park

February 2012 Replay	Crumlin United	0–2	Killester United	Pearse Park

29 January 2012	Everton	3–0	St. Patrick's C.Y.	Everton Park

29 January 2012	College Corinthians	2–1	Kildrum Tigers	Corinthians Park

27 January 2012	Blarney United	0–2	Avondale United	O'Shea Park

== Quarter-final ==
The draw was made on 7 February 2012 at FAI Headquarters, Abbotstown by the FAI Domestic Committee. Ties will be played on the weekend of 4 March 2012.

3 March 2012	Avondale United	4–1	College Corinthians	Avondale Park

4 March 2012	Cherry Orchard	3–0	Malahide United	Le Fanu Park

4 March 2012	Everton	2–2	Phoenix F.C. Navan Road	Everton Park

18 March 2012 Replay	Phoenix F.C. Navan Road	1–2	Everton	Martin Savage Park

4 March 2012	Killester United	0–0	Verona	Hadden Park

18 March 2012 Replay	Verona	2–0	Killester United	Verona Sports and Leisure Club, Blanchardstown

== Semi-final ==
The draw was made on 6 February 2012 at the FAI Headquarters, Abbotstown, by FAI President Paddy McCaul and former Drogheda United, Shamrock Rovers, Derry City and Shelbourne star Mick Neville. Ties will be played on the weekend of 8 April 2012.

7 April 2012	Avondale United	1–1	Everton	Avondale Park

21 April 2012 Replay	Everton	0–4	Avondale United	Everton Park

8 April 2012	Cherry Orchard	0–0	Verona	Le Fanu Park

22 April 2012 Replay	Verona	1–2	Cherry Orchard	Verona Sports and Leisure Club, Blanchardstown

== Final ==
13 May 2012	Avondale United	2–1 (a.e.t.)	Cherry Orchard	Tallaght Stadium
3pm	Long 90+3'; Cahill 113'	Report	McCarthy 66'
