= 2013–14 FAI Intermediate Cup =

Tournament details
- Country: Ireland

Final positions
- Champions: Avondale United
- Runners-up: UCD Reserves

The 2013–14 FAI Umbro Intermediate Cup was the 87th season of the FAI Intermediate Cup. Intermediate clubs from the Leinster Senior League, the Munster Senior League and the Ulster Senior League entered the competition. Avondale United finished as winners after they defeated UCD Reserves 3–0 in the final in Turners Cross. As a result Avondale United also became only the second club after Distillery to win the cup four consecutive seasons. They also became the first club to win the FAI Intermediate Cup seven times, making them the competition's most successful club.

== First round ==
In the first round the tournament is regionalised with clubs from each provincial league playing each other. The draw was made on 7 September 2013.

=== Ulster ===
22 September 2013	Fanad United	2 - 2 (a.e.t.) (1 - 4 p)	Bonagee United	Tragh-a-Lough

Byes:

- Cockhill Celtic
- Drumkeen United
- Kildrum Tigers
- Letterkenny Rovers
- Swilly Rovers

=== Munster ===
22 September 2013	Avondale United	9 - 0	Crofton Celtic	Avondale Park

22 September 2013	Rockmount	5 - 0	CIT	Rockmount Park

22 September 2013	Midleton	4 - 1	Crosshaven	Knockgriffin

22 September 2013	Leeside	0 - 1	Everton	Inchigeela

22 September 2013	Kinsale	2 - 4	College Corinthians	Madden Park

22 September 2013	Ballincollig	2 - 0	Ballinhassig	Landing Field

22 September 2013	Bandon	2 - 3	Wilton United	Town Park, Bandon

29 September 2013	Douglas Hall	4 - 0	Glasheen	Moneygourney

Byes:

- Blarney United
- Carrigaline United
- Casement Celtic
- Castleview
- Fermoy
- Leeds
- Mallow United
- Mayfield United
- Ringmahon Rangers
- St. Mary's
- Temple United
- Tramore Athletic
- UCC
- Youghal United

=== Leinster ===
22 September 2013	Broadford Rovers	1 - 1 (a.e.t.) (4 - 3 p)	Peamount/Moyle Park	Stonemasons Way, Ballinteer

22 September 2013	St. Joseph's Boys	2 - 4 (a.e.t.)	Bangor Celtic	Pearse Park, Sallynoggin

22 September 2013	Killester United	7 - 0	Rathcoole Boys	Haddon Park

22 September 2013	Confey	0 - 1	Drumcondra	St. Catherine's Park, Leixlip

22 September 2013	Mount Merrion	0 - 7	Tolka Rovers	MM Grounds

22 September 2013	Malahide United	3 - 2	Dublin Bus	Gannon Park

22 September 2013	Wayside Celtic	1 - 2	Swords Celtic	Jackson Park

22 September 2013	Glebe North	3 - 1	Verona	Market Green, Balbriggan

22 September 2013	Lucan United	1 - 5	St. Mochta's	Airlie Heights, Lucan

22 September 2013	Phoenix F.C. Navan Road	6 - 1	Edenderry Town	Martin Savage Park

22 September 2013	Kilnamanagh	0 - 6	UCD Reserves	Treepark Road

22 September 2013	Templeogue United	3 - 4	Bluebell United	Tymon Park

22 September 2013	Cherry Orchard	8 - 1	CYM Terenure	Le Fanu Park

22 September 2013	Wicklow Rovers	2 - 4	St. Francis	Station Road, Wicklow

22 September 2013	St. James Gate	2 - 2 (a.e.t.) (3 - 4 p)	Newtown Rangers	Iveagh Grounds

22 September 2013	Pegasus/St. James Athletic	0 - 1 (a.e.t.)	Arklow Town	Belfield Park

22 September 2013	Dublin University	2 - 1	Ballyfermot United	College Park

22 September 2013	Crumlin United	9 - 0	Glenmore/Dundrum	Pearse Park

22 September 2013	Parkvilla	1 - 3	Sacred Heart	Claremont Stadium

28 September 2013	T.E.K. United	3 - 1	Celbridge Town	Deansgrange

Byes:

- Beggsboro
- Belgrove/Home Farm
- Drogheda Town
- Dunboyne
- Firhouse/Clover
- Garda
- Glenville
- Greystones
- Greystones United
- Leixlip United
- Newbridge Town
- Portmarnock
- Ratoath Harps
- St. Patrick's C.Y.F.C.
- Skerries Town
- Tymon Celtic

== Second round ==
The Second round is also regionalised with clubs from each provincial league playing each other.

=== Ulster ===
27 October 2013	Drumkeen United	4 - 5 (a.e.t.)	Cockhill Celtic	Drumkeen

27 October 2013	Bonagee United	2 - 6	Letterkenny Rovers	Dry Arch Park

27 October 2013	Swilly Rovers	2 - 0	Kildrum Tigers	Swilly Park

=== Munster ===
26 October 2013	UCC	3 - 0	Midleton	The Farm
14:30

26 October 2013	Mayfield United	5 - 1	Wilton United	Mayfield Park
14:30

26 October 2013	Ballincollig	0 - 1	Casement Celtic	Landing Field
14:30

26 October 2013	Mallow United	3 - 3 (a.e.t.) (2 - 4 p)	Carrigaline United	Town Park
14:30

27 October 2013	Temple United	0 - 6	College Corinthians	Temple Park
10:45

7 November 2013	Rockmount	4 - 1	Everton	Rockmount Park

9 November 2013	Youghal United	2 - 3	Leeds	Adrath Park

9 November 2013	Blarney United	2 - 4	Tramore Athletic	O'Shea Park

9 November 2013	St. Mary's	1 - 0	Fermoy	St. Mary's Park

9 November 2013	Ringmahon Rangers	4 - 3	Castleview	Ringmahon Park

10 November 2013	Douglas Hall	0 - 2	Avondale United	Moneygourney

=== Leinster ===
24 October 2013	Drogheda Town	0 - 1	Drumcondra	Marian Park
19:45

24 October 2013	Malahide United	0 - 0 (a.e.t.) (4 - 2 p)	Bangor Celtic	Gannon Park
19:45		Report

25 October 2013	Glebe North	1 - 2	Phoenix F.C. Navan Road	Market Green
19:45		Report

25 October 2013	St. Francis	4 - 0	Beggsboro	John Hyland Park
19:45		Report

25 October 2013	Garda	0 - 1	Greystones United	St. Raphael's
19:45

25 October 2013	St. Patrick's C.Y.F.C.	5 - 0	Sacred Heart	Ringsend Astro
19:45		Report

25 October 2013	Newbridge Town	0 - 5	Crumlin United	Station Road, Newbridge
19:45		Report

26 October 2013	Arklow Town	0 - 4	Bluebell United	Bridgewater Park
19:30

27 October 2013	Glenville	1 - 0	Newtown Rangers	Palmerstown C.S.
11:00

27 October 2013	Dublin University	6 - 0	Tymon Celtic	College Park
11:00

27 October 2013	UCD Reserves	3 - 0	Dunboyne	Belfield Park
11:00

27 October 2013	Firhouse Clover	0 - 1	Leixlip United	Tallaght IT
11:00

27 October 2013	Celbridge Town	1 - 2	St. Mochta's	St. Patrick's Park
11:00

27 October 2013	Swords Celtic	6 - 3	Ratoath Harps	Balheary
14:30

27 October 2013	Skerries Town	3 - 0	Portmarnock	Park Lane
14:30

27 October 2013	Killester United	2 - 0	Broadford Rovers	Haddon Park
14:30		Report

1 November 2013	Belgrove/Home Farm	2 - 0	Cherry Orchard	Whitehall Stadium
19:30

10 November 2013	Greystones	1 - 1 (a.e.t.) (2 - 4 p)	Tolka Rovers	Archfield

== Third round ==
The draw for the third round was made on 5 November 2013 by the FAI Domestic Committee.

30 November 2013	Mayfield United	1 - 0	Greystones United	Mayfield Park

29 November 2013	St. Patrick's C.Y.F.C.	5 - 3	Glenville	Ringsend Astro
		Report

30 November 2013	UCC	4 - 0	Swords Celtic	The Farm

30 November 2013	Leeds	0 - 2	Malahide United	Leeds Park

30 November 2013	Phoenix F.C. Navan Road	2 - 0	St. Mary's	Martin Savage Park

30 November 2013	Ringmahon Rangers	1 - 2	Tolka Rovers	Ringmahon Park

1 December 2012	Killester United	0 - 2	Drumcondra	Haddon Park
		Report

1 December 2012	Dublin University	1 - 2	St. Mochta's	College Park

1 December 2012	Belgrove/Home Farm	3 - 1	College Corinthians	Whitehall Stadium

1 December 2013	Rockmount	0 - 2	Avondale United	Rockmount Park

1 December 2013	Tramore Athletic	1 - 4	Carrigaline United	Tramore Park

1 December 2013	Casement Celtic	0 - 2	Bluebell United	Casement Park

1 December 2013	Crumlin United	0 - 0	Cockhill Celtic	Armagh Road
		Report

15 December 2013 Replay	Cockhill Celtic	2 - 1	Crumlin United	St. Mary's Park
		Report

1 December 2013	Skerries Town	1 - 5	Leixlip United	Pearse Park

1 December 2013	Swilly Rovers	1 - 6	UCD Reserves	Swilly Park

8 December 2013	Letterkenny Rovers	1 - 1	St. Francis	Leckview Park

15 December 2013 Replay	St. Francis	1 - 1 (a.e.t.) (5 - 4 p)	Letterkenny Rovers	John Hyland Park
		Report

== Fourth round ==
The draw for this round was made on 4 December 2013 by the FAI Domestic Committee. The 16 teams that reach the fourth round also qualified for the 2014 FAI Cup.

24 January 2014	Belgrove/Home Farm F.C.	2 - 0	St. Francis	Whitehall Stadium
19:30		Report

24 January 2014	Leixlip United	3 - 0	Phoenix F.C. Navan Road	Leixlip Amenities Centre
19:45

24 January 2014	Tolka Rovers	2 - 0	Drumcondra	Frank Cooke Park
19:45		Report

25 January 2014	Mayfield United	1 - 0	UCC	Mayfield Park
14:00

26 January 2014	UCD Reserves	3 - 0	Bluebell United	Belfield Park
11:00		Report

26 January 2014	St. Mochta's	2 - 0	Cockhill Celtic	Porterstown Road
12:00		Report

26 January 2014	Malahide United	0 - 3	Avondale United	Gannon Park
14:00

26 January 2014	Carrigaline United	1 - 1	St. Patrick's C.Y.F.C.	Ballea Park
14:00		Report

9 February 2014 Replay	St. Patrick's C.Y.F.C.	3 - 2	Carrigaline United	Ringsend Astro
14:00

== Quarter-finals ==
The draw for the quarter-final was made on 4 February 2014 by the FAI Domestic Committee.

28 February 2014	Tolka Rovers	5 - 2	St. Mochta's	Frank Cooke Park

1 March 2014	Mayfield United	0 - 3	St. Patrick's C.Y.F.C.	Mayfield Park

2 March 2014	UCD Reserves	2 - 0	Leixlip United	Belfield Park

2 March 2014	Belgrove/Home Farm F.C.	0 - 1	Avondale United	Whitehall Stadium

== Semi-finals ==
The draw for the quarter-final was made on 5 March 2014 by the FAI Domestic Committee.

29 March 2014	St. Patrick's C.Y.F.C.	0 - 0	UCD Reserves	Ringsend Astro
		Report

13 April 2014 Replay	UCD Reserves	5 - 0	St. Patrick's C.Y.F.C.	Belfield Park
11:00		Report

30 March 2014	Tolka Rovers	0 - 2	Avondale United	Frank Cooke Park
13:30		Report

== Final ==
11 May 2014	Avondale United	3 - 0	UCD Reserves	Turners Cross
1pm	Ian Stapleton; Graham McCarthy (pen); Danny Long	Report		Referee: Pat Murphy
