= Pat Goggin =

Irish footballer (1940–2025)

Personal information
- Full name: Patrick Goggin
- Date of birth: 1940
- Place of birth: North Mall, Cork, Ireland
- Date of death: 14 January 2025 (aged 84)
- Place of death: Wilton, Cork, Ireland
- Position: Midfielder

Youth career
- Glasheen

Senior career*
Years	Team	Apps	(Gls)
1960–1966	Cork Hibernians		
1966–1977	Tramore Athletic		
- * Club domestic league appearances and goals

Patrick Goggin (1940 – 14 January 2025) was an Irish footballer. A midfielder, his career spanned four decades and saw him line out in the League of Ireland with Cork Hibernians before later transferring to Tramore Athletic.

== Career ==
Goggin's footballing career began as a schoolboy with Glasheen, with whom he won the under–15 league and the Munster minor cup. Believing he was not good enough to progress to senior level with Glasheen, he transferred to junior club St Michael's in the Cork AUL. Goggin joined Cork Hibernians and won a Munster Senior Cup title in his debut season in 1960–61. He also lined out in the 1963 FAI Cup final defeat by Shelbourne. Goggin claimed a Dublin City Cup title in his final season with the club.

Goggin transferred to Tramore Athletic for the 1966–67 seasons and spent 11 years with the club. During that time he won two Munster Senior League titles, as well as being FAI Intermediate Cup runners-up in 1967. The last six years of Goggin's career were spent with Blackpool Celtic and Hillington in the Cork AUL.

== Personal life and death ==
Goggin was in ill health for much of his later life. After overcoming stomach cancer in the late 1990s, he died at Cork University Hospital on 14 January 2025, at the age of 84.

== Honours ==
Cork Hibernians

- Dublin City Cup: 1965–66

Tramore Athletic

- Munster Senior League: 1966–67, 1973–74
