= Athletic Union League =

Athletic Union League may refer to:

- Athletic Union League (Dublin), association football league in the Republic of Ireland
- Cork Athletic Union League, association football league in the Republic of Ireland
