= Avondale United F.C. =

Avondale United F.C. may refer to:

- Avondale United F.C. (Cork), a Republic of Ireland association football club.
- Avondale United F.C., a New Zealand association football club that after a merger was renamed Lynn-Avon United.
