= West Cork League =

- Founded: 1978
- Country: (Republic of Ireland) Ireland
- Confederation: Munster Football Association
- Divisions: Premier Division; Championship Division; WCL Womens 7s Tournament
- Number of clubs: 19 (2024–25)
- Level on pyramid: 7 & 8
- League cup: Beamish Cup (Note: Previously known as the Flor Crowley Cup and the MyGaff.ie Cup)
- Current champions: Drinagh Rangers (11th title) (2025–26)
- Website: www.westcorkleague.com

The West Cork League (WCL) is an association football league open to amateur and junior clubs from West Cork. The top tier, the Premier Division, is on the seventh level of the Republic of Ireland football league system. It is affiliated to both the Munster Football Association and the Football Association of Ireland.

The league operates a winter schedule, beginning in early September.

== History ==
The West Cork League (WCL) was formed in 1978 by Mick Lynch and Michael Holland with the involvement of Denis Kelleher, Sean Lally and Jimmy Dunne. Before the league's creation, the only option for clubs from West Cork — including Bandon A.F.C. and Clonakilty A.F.C. — was to play in the Cork Athletic Union League. The founding members of the league included Crookstown, Castletown Celtic, Kileady, Ballinhassig, Our Ladies Hospital and Brinny. Drinagh Rangers was founded in 1983 and joined the league the same year. They were followed by Dunmanway Celtic (later renamed Togher Celtic) in 1983–1984, Bunratty in 1987 and Bay Rovers in 1990.

In 1990, discussions were held with the Cork Athletic Union League about a possible merger but the two leagues could not reach an agreement. Instead, the WCL joined the Munster Senior League (MSL) in 1991 as an associate member. The WCL also became an affiliate of the Munster FA and the Football Association of Ireland (FAI), inheriting the rules of both associations. Beamish began sponsoring all three divisions of the league in 1992. The brewery also took over sponsorship of the Flor Crowley Cup and the Carling League Cup. In 1993, after two years under the Munster Senior League, the WCL left the arrangement, forming their own council and ceasing to be an associate member. The mid-1990s saw the league's membership double and by 1997 the WCL featured approximately 23 clubs. The decade also brought the addition of underage leagues, shortly followed by an under–18 league, and a women's league. After a period of inactivity, the Ladies League was revived in 2004–05 with the following seven teams: Bandon — who won the league and cup double — Bay Rovers, Clonakilty Ladies, Crookstown, Drinagh, Dunmanway and Lyre.

Bunratty United won promotion to the Premier Division in 2017–18 after winning the O'BrienWaterServices.com Division 1 title. This was also the final season of the WCL Division 2 before it was merged into the WCL Championship.

Drinagh Rangers have been the most successful club since the turn of the century, winning 11 Premier Division titles (and finishing in the top 2 on 18 occasions) and 4 Beamish Cups, with the club's B team also winning the Division 2 title in the 2018–19 season and 2019–20 season.

A number of changes to the league setup were made in advance of the 2018–19 season; Division 1 was renamed to the "Championship Division", a promotion/relegation playoff between the Premier Division and the Championship was added and promotion playoffs were introduced to the Championship to determine which team would qualify for the promotion/relegation playoff. This season also saw the return of the Under-18 division and a new mini-league for the Division 2 trophy, contested by the clubs that finish in the bottom half of the WCL Championship.

== League pyramid ==
In the West Cork League, clubs are currently permitted to field two teams in the same division of the league. A system of promotion and relegation applies between the Premier Division and the Championship Division. In the event of two or more clubs being equal in points, the clubs must playoff to decide the championship or relegation. As of 2025, the WCL first division is known as the 'PremierHiSpecCars.com Premier Division' and the second division is known as the 'O'BrienWaterServices.com Championship' for sponsorship purposes. The below format has been agreed for the 2024–25 season:

Pyramid Level	League(s) / division(s)
7	WCL Premier Division 8 clubs – 1 or 2 relegations
8	WCL Championship Division 11 clubs – 1 or 2 promotions

== Representative team ==
In 2005–06 the West Cork League representative team reached the final of the Oscar Traynor Cup but lost 5–0 to the Athletic Union League (Dublin). In 2015 the West Cork League representative team featured Cork GAA player Colm O'Driscoll.

== 2025–26 teams ==
Premier HiSpecCars.com Premier Division

- Bunratty
- Clonakilty Soccer Club
- Drinagh Rangers
- Drinagh Rangers B
- Dunmanway Town
- Lyre Rovers
- Togher Celtic
- Ardfield AFC

== List of winners ==
=== Premier Division ===
Season	Winner	Runners-up
2025–26	Drinagh Rangers	Clonakilty Soccer Club
2024–25	Clonakilty Soccer Club	Drinagh Rangers
2023–24	Clonakilty Soccer Club	Drinagh Rangers
2022–23	Drinagh Rangers	Dunmanway Town
2021–22	Drinagh Rangers	Dunmanway Town
2020–21	Cancelled Due To COVID	
2019–20	Drinagh Rangers	Dunmanway Town
2018–19	Dunmanway Town	Ballydehob
2017–18	Drinagh Rangers	Lyre Rovers
2016–17	Dunmanway Town	Drinagh Rangers
2015–16	Riverside Athletic	Drinagh Rangers
2014–15	Drinagh Rangers	Clonakilty AFC
2013–14	Skibbereen	Drinagh Rangers
2012–13	Drinagh Rangers	Dunmanway Town
2011–12	Dunmanway Town	Skibbereen
2010–11	Bunratty United	Skibbereen
2009–10	Skibbereen	Drinagh Rangers
2008–09	Drinagh Rangers	Dunmanway Town
2007–08	Skibbereen	Clonakilty AFC
2006–07	Drinagh Rangers	Skibbereen
2005–06	Crossmahon	Bantry Gunners
2004–05	Drinagh Rangers	Crossmahon (Note: After play-off)
2003–04	Drinagh Rangers	Crossmahon
2002–03	Drinagh Rangers	Bunratty United
2001–02	Bunratty United	Drinagh Rangers
2000–01	Timoleague	Bunratty United
1999–2000	Bunratty United	
1998–99	Timoleague	
1997–98	Bunratty United	
1996–97	Bunratty United	
1995–96	Crossmahon	
1994–95	Togher Celtic	

=== Division 1 (Championship) ===
Season	Winner	Runners-up
2025-26	Ardfield	Bunratty United
2024–25	Baltimore	Lyre Rovers
2023–24	Castletown Celtic	Drinagh Rangers B
2022–23	Sullane	Beara United
2021–22	Bunratty United	Castletown Celtic
2020–21	Cancelled due to COVID	
2019–20	Spartak Mossgrove	Mizen AFC
2018–19	Durrus	Mizen AFC
2017–18	Bunratty United	Clonakilty Town
2016–17	Spartak Mossgrove	Lyre Rovers
2015–16	Ballydehob	Bay Rovers
2014–15	Bunratty United	Leeside
2013–14	Mizen AFC	Clonakilty Town
2012–13	Crookstown	Cloughduv
2011–12	Togher Celtic	Sullane
2010–11	Bay Rovers	Crookstown
2009–10	Molaga Celtic	Droumree Dynamos
2008–09	Togher Celtic	Bunratty United
2007–08	Aultagh Celtic	Ardfield
2006–07	Crookstown	Clonakilty AFC
2005–06	Dunmanway Town	Skibbereen B
2004–05	Old Chapel Celtic	Lyre Rovers
2003–04	Bantry Gunners	Durrus
2002–03	Dunmanway Town	Sullane
2001–02	Ballydehob	Ilen Celtic
1993–94	Ballinhassig AFC	

=== Division 2 ===
Season	Winner	Runners-up
2021–present	Merged With Division 1	
2020–21	Cancelled Due To COVID	
2019–20	Drinagh Rangers B	Castletown Celtic
2018–19	Drinagh Rangers B	Baltimore
2017–18	Lyre Rovers B	Sullane
2016–17	Clonakilty Town	Durrus
2015–16	Lyre Rovers	Spartak Mossgrove
2014–15	Ballydehob	Bay Rovers
2013–14	Kilmichael Rovers	Bunratty United
2012–13	Mizen AFC	Castletown Celtic
2011–12	Lyre Rovers	Rosscarbery
2010–11	Sullane	Cloughduv
2009–10	Baltimore	Crookstown
2008–09	Molaga Celtic	Rosscarbery
2007–08	Castletown Celtic	Droumree Dynamos
2006–07	Ardfield	Rosscarbery
2005–06	Clonakilty AFC	Aultagh Celtic
2004–05	Courtmacsherry	Castlelack
2003–04	Lyre Rovers	Bay Rovers
2002–03	Caheragh Celtic	Lissarda
2001–02	Gurrane Celtic	Bantry Gunners

=== Beamish Cup ===
Season	Winner	Runners-up
2025-26	Drinagh Rangers	Ardfield
2024–25	Clonakilty Soccer Club	Ardfield
2023–24	Clonakilty Soccer Club	Drinagh Rangers
2022–23	Dunmanway Town	Bunratty United
2021–22	Lyre Rovers	Clonakilty Soccer Club
2020–21	Dunmanway Town	Clonakilty Soccer Club
2019–20	Dunmanway Town	Clonakilty Town
2018–19	Togher Celtic	Drinagh Rangers
2017–18	Drinagh Rangers	Lyre Rovers
2016–17	Drinagh Rangers	Bay Rovers
2015–16	Crookstown	Dunmanway Town
2014–15	Dunmanway Town	Crookstown
2013–14	Drinagh Rangers	Crookstown
2012–13	Riverside Athletic	Clonakilty AFC
2011–12	Rosscarbery	Skibbereen
2010–11	Bunratty United	Mizen AFC
2009–10	Bunratty United	Drinagh Rangers
2008–09	Ballydehob	Ardfield
2007–08	Clonakilty AFC	Bunratty United
2006–07	Drinagh Rangers	Aultagh Celtic
2005–06	Bantry Gunners	Bunratty United
2004–05	Leeside	Ardfield
2003–04	Dunmanway Town	Gurrane Celtic
2002–03	Dunmanway Town	Timoleague
2001–02	Crossmahon	Drinagh Rangers

=== Trophies won by club ===
The following list displays the number of trophies won by each West Cork club since the turn of the century:

Club	No. of Trophies
Drinagh Rangers	30
Bunratty United	15
Dunmanway Town	14
Crookstown	8
Skibbereen	8
Ballydehob	7
Clonakilty Soccer Club	7
Bantry Gunners	6
Castletown Celtic	6
Drinagh Rangers B	6
Togher Celtic	6
Ardfield	6
Mizen AFC	5
Lyre Rovers	5
Bay Rovers	4
Durrus	4
Molaga Celtic	3
Clonakilty AFC	3
Leeside	3
Clonakilty Town	3
Baltimore	2
Crossmahon	2
Kilmichael Rovers	2
Riverside Athletic	2
Courtmacsherry	2
Spartak Mossgrove	2
Sullane	2
Gurrane Celtic	1
Aultagh Celtic	1
Lyre Rovers B	1
Old Chapel Celtic	1
Castlelack	1
Rosscarbery	1
Dunmanway Town B	1
Caheragh Celtic	1

== List of defunct clubs ==
The following displays a list of clubs who have become defunct or have left the West Cork League:

Club
Ballydehob
Bantry Gunners
Belgooly
Bridge Side Celtic
Caheragh Celtic
Clonakilty AFC
Clonakilty Town
Cloughduv
Crookstown
Crossmahon
Droumree Dynamos
Durrus
Gurrane Celtic
Harbour United
Ilen Celtic
Knockavilla
Leeside
Molaga Celtic
Old Chapel Celtic
Pike Rovers
Rosscarbery
Sullane F.C.
Timoleague
