= MUFC (disambiguation) =

Manchester United F.C. (MUFC) is an association football club in Manchester, England

MUFC may also refer to:

== Association football clubs ==
- Madura United F.C., Indonesia
- Mahindra United F.C., India
- Maidenhead United F.C., England
- Maidstone United F.C., England
  - Maidstone United F.C. (1897), predecessor of the current club
- Malahide United F.C., Ireland
- Mallow United F.C., Ireland
- Malut United F.C., Indonesia
- Manchester 62 F.C., Gibraltar, formerly "Manchester United F.C." in their honour
- Manly United FC, Australia
- Maritzburg United F.C., South Africa
- Mathare United F.C., Kenya
- Melaka United F.C., Malaysia
- Minnesota United FC, United States
- Mitsubishi Urawa F.C., a former name of Urawa Red Diamonds, Japan
- Monaghan United F.C., Ireland
- Muangthong United F.C., Thailand

== Australian rules football clubs ==
- Melbourne University Football Club, Victoria, Australia

== Other uses ==
- Mandela United Football Club, Winnie Mandela's protection detail in the late 1980s
- Maritime Underwater Future Capability, a Royal Navy project

== See also ==
- Manchester United F.C. Reserves and Academy, the reserves and academy of Manchester United Football Club
