= Josh Honohan =

Irish footballer

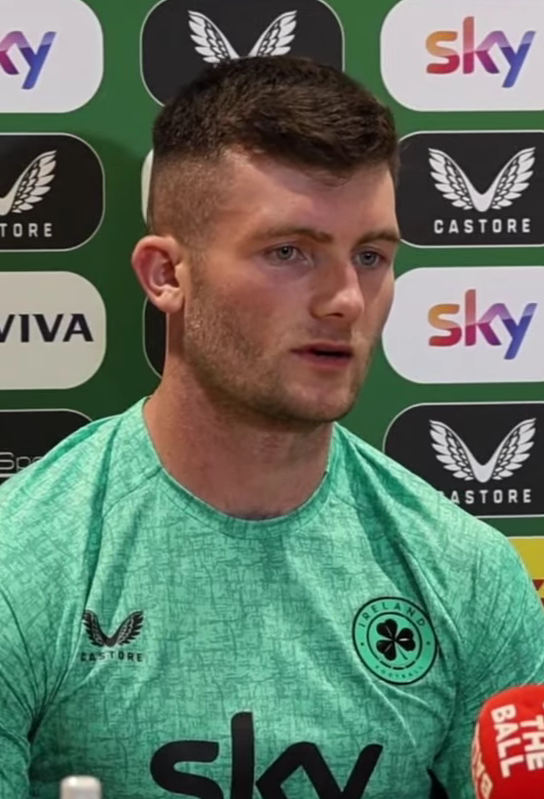
- Honohan in 2025

Personal information
- Full name: Joshua Phillip Honohan
- Date of birth: 28 March 2001 (age 25)
- Place of birth: Carrigaline, County Cork, Ireland
- Positions: Centre-back; left-back; wing-back

Team information
- Current team: Lincoln City
- Number: 23

Youth career
- –2018: Carrigaline United
- 2018–2021: Cork City

Senior career*
| Years | Team | Apps | (Gls) |
| 2019–2023 | Cork City | 59 | (2) |
| 2024–2025 | Shamrock Rovers | 67 | (7) |
| 2026– | Lincoln City | 1 | (0) |
- * Club domestic league appearances and goals as of 21:09, 8 September 2026 (UTC)

Joshua Phillip Honohan (born 28 March 2001) is an Irish professional footballer who plays as a defender for EFL Championship club Lincoln City.

== Career ==
=== Youth career ===
A native of Carrigaline, County Cork, Honohan attended St Francis College Rochestown, and began playing football with local side Carrigaline United before joining the academy of Cork City in 2018, where he spent a year at under 17 level, followed by another year at under 19 level, before signing his first professional contract with the club in August 2019.

=== Cork City ===
Honohan made his senior debut for Cork City on 30 August 2019, coming off the bench in the 76th minute of a 4–2 defeat at home to Sligo Rovers in the League of Ireland Premier Division, in newly appointed manager Neale Fenn's first game in charge of the club. 3 days later he made his first start for the club, in a 2–1 defeat at home to Waterford at Turners Cross. His progress at first team level stalled in 2020 however due to injury and the season being halved due to COVID-19, as the club were relegated to the League of Ireland First Division. He made 8 appearances in all competitions in 2021. On 22 July 2022, he scored the first senior goal of his career, in a 1–0 win away to Wexford at Ferrycarrig Park. Honohan became a mainstay in the team in 2022 as he featured 21 times in all competitions, scoring twice as his side won the 2022 League of Ireland First Division to gain promotion. Following their promotion back to the top flight, in December 2022 Honohan signed a new contract with the club for the 2023 season. Honohan featured 39 times in all competitions in the 2023 season, scoring 2 FAI Cup goals, in a season which ended on 10 November 2023, when the side lost the 2023 League of Ireland Premier Division Play-off 2–1 to Waterford at Tallaght Stadium, resulting in relegation back to the League of Ireland First Division.

=== Shamrock Rovers ===
On 16 November 2023, Honohan signed for Shamrock Rovers. He made his debut for the club on 9 February 2024 in the 2024 President of Ireland's Cup, scoring his sides second goal in a 3–1 win over St Patrick's Athletic. On 24 October 2024, he scored the first European goal of his career, opening the scoring after 3 minutes in a 4–1 win away to Larne at Windsor Park in the 2024–25 UEFA Conference League. Honohan had an impressive first season with the club, as he featured 50 times in all competitions, scoring 3 goals as he helped the club reach the UEFA Conference League knockout stages for the first time. He was voted into the 2024 PFAI Premier Division Team of the Year by his fellow professionals across the league. On 1 September 2025, Rovers turned down a bid in the region of €625,000 for Honohan from EFL League One club Lincoln City. On 9 November 2025, he featured in the 2025 FAI Cup final as his side defeated his former club Cork City 2–0 at the Aviva Stadium to complete the league and cup double. He was voted into the PFAI Premier Division Team of the Year for the second season running by his fellow players in the league, for his performances in 2025.

=== Lincoln City ===
On 18 December 2025, it was confirmed Honohan had signed for EFL League One club Lincoln City which would become official on 1 January 2026, with the transfer fee believed to be in the region of €500,000. On the move becoming official, Lincoln City confirmed he has picked up a load-related injury towards the back end of Shamrock Rovers's season and they wouldn't rush him into first team involvement. He did not return from injury in time to make his debut before the end of the 2025–26 season, as the club won promotion to the EFL Championship by winning EFL League One. He made his debut on 25 August 2026 in the EFL Cup, starting the game against Blackpool.

== International career ==
Honohan was called up to the Republic of Ireland U21 squad for the first time in October 2021 for their game away to Montenegro U21, but was not capped. In March 2025, he was in Heimir Hallgrímsson's provisional senior Republic of Ireland squad for their UEFA Nations League games against Bulgaria. On 14 May 2025, he received his first full senior call up to the Republic of Ireland national team for their friendly fixtures against Senegal and Luxembourg in June.

== Career statistics ==
As of match played on 8 September 2026

Appearances and goals by club, season and competition
| Club | Season | League | | | National Cup (Note: Includes FAI Cup) | | League Cup (Note: Includes League of Ireland Cup & EFL Cup) | | Europe | | Other | | Total | |
| Club | Season | Division | Apps | Goals | Apps | Goals | Apps | Goals | Apps | Goals | Apps | Goals | Apps | Goals |
|---|---|---|---|---|---|---|---|---|---|---|---|---|---|---|
| Cork City | 2019 | LOI Premier Division | 2 | 0 | 0 | 0 | 0 | 0 | 0 (Note: Appearance(s) in the UEFA Europa League) | 0 | 0 (Note: Appearance(s) in the Munster Senior Cup) | 0 | 2 | 0 |
| Cork City | 2020 | LOI Premier Division | 0 | 0 | 0 | 0 | – | | – | | 2 | 0 | 2 | 0 |
| Cork City | 2021 | LOI First Division | 7 | 0 | 1 | 0 | – | | – | | – | | 8 | 0 |
| Cork City | 2022 | LOI First Division | 17 | 2 | 2 | 0 | – | | – | | 2 | 0 | 21 | 2 |
| Cork City | 2023 | LOI Premier Division | 33 | 0 | 4 | 2 | – | | – | | 2 (Note: 1 appearance in the Munster Senior Cup & 1 appearance in the 2023 League of Ireland Promotion/Relegation Division play-off) | 0 | 39 | 2 |
| Cork City | Total | | 59 | 2 | 7 | 2 | – | | 0 | 0 | 6 | 0 | 72 | 4 |
| Shamrock Rovers | 2024 | LOI Premier Division | 35 | 1 | 1 | 0 | – | | 13 (Note: 4 appearance in the UEFA Champions League; 3 appearances in the UEFA Europa League; 6 appearances, 1 goal in the UEFA Conference League) | 1 | 1 (Note: Appearance in the President of Ireland's Cup) | 1 | 50 | 3 |
| Shamrock Rovers | 2025 | LOI Premier Division | 32 | 6 | 4 | 0 | – | | 10 (Note: 2 appearances in the 2024–25 UEFA Conference League campaign; 8 appearances, 1 goal in the 2025–26 UEFA Conference League campaign) | 1 | 0 (Note: Appearance(s) in the Leinster Senior Cup) | 0 | 46 | 7 |
| Shamrock Rovers | Total | | 67 | 7 | 5 | 0 | – | | 23 | 2 | 1 | 1 | 96 | 10 |
| Lincoln City | 2025–26 | EFL League One | 0 | 0 | – | | – | | – | | – | | 0 | 0 |
| Lincoln City | 2026–27 | EFL Championship | 1 | 0 | 0 | 0 | 2 | 0 | – | | – | | 3 | 0 |
| Lincoln City | Total | | 1 | 0 | 0 | 0 | 2 | 0 | – | | – | | 3 | 0 |
| Career total | | | 127 | 9 | 12 | 2 | 2 | 0 | 23 | 2 | 7 | 1 | 173 | 14 |

== Honours ==
Shamrock Rovers

- League of Ireland Premier Division: 2025
- FAI Cup: 2025

Lincoln City

- EFL League One: 2025–26
