= Leeside A.F.C =

Leeside AFC
- Full name: Leeside Association Football Club
- Founded: 1968
- Ground: Leeside Ground; Little Island, Cork
- Chairman: (Republic of Ireland) Barry Cotter
- Manager: (Republic of Ireland) John Gettings
- League: Munster Senior League 2nd Division
- Website: http://www.leesideafc.ie

Leeside A.F.C. is an Irish football club from Little Island, Cork currently playing in the Munster Senior League.

The club also have teams in the Cork Schoolboy League, Cork Woman's and Schoolgirl League and Cork Youth League.

== History ==
Leeside was founded in 1968 under the name Island Albion. Jimmy O'Sullivan was amongst the club's co-founders. The formation of a club arose from challenge games that were played between different areas of the parish; St. Lappan's, Clash and Glounthaune. Players from these games came together to found a club that would enter the 1968–69 season of the Cork Athletic Union League. Island Albion played at Church Road until 1971 when the club began to encounter financial problems as well as struggles in fielding a team.

Although Island Albion withdrew from the Cork Athletic Union League (AUL) for the 1971–72 season, the challenge matches between St Lappan's, Clash and Glounthaune continued. In 1971, amidst growing popularity, Island Albion returned under the name of Little Island Athletic. Tony Dunlea and Martin O'Neill helped in re-establishing the club while they played on a field that was owned by then player Bill Cogan.

The youth setup was the key to the clubs success in the 80s. They went the 1989–1990 season unbeaten, beating Coachford 4–1 on penalties in the cup final and gaining promotion to the premier division for the first time.

On 4 January 2024, Leeside A.F.C. underwent a name change to become Leeside United. In August 2024, the club opened the Martin O'Neill Astro, an all-weather pitch named after one of the club's founders.

== Notable former players ==
Republic of Ireland under-21 internationals

- Cathal O'Sullivan

== Honours ==
- Munster Senior League
  - Division 2 - Winners 2024
- Cork Athletic Union League
  - Premier A - Winners 1998
  - Division 1b - Winners 1991,1997
  - Division 2 - Winners 1986
  - County Cup - Winners 1991,1994,1997
  - Presidents Cup Winners 1985
