= Premier Division =

Premier Division may refer to

== Association football ==
- Antigua and Barbuda Premier Division
- Barbados Premier Division
- Bermudian Premier Division
- Gibraltar Premier Division
- Premier Division of the Isthmian League, England
- Liga Indonesia Premier Division
- League of Ireland Premier Division, Republic of Ireland
- Premier Division of the Leicestershire Senior League, England
- Premier Division of the North West Counties Football League, England
- Premier Division of the Northern Counties East Football League, England
- Northern Premier League Premier Division, England
- Premier Division of the Oxfordshire Senior Football League, England
- Scottish Football League Premier Division (1975–1998)
- South African Premier Division
- Santiago South Premier Division
- Premier Division of the South West Peninsula League, England
- Premier Division of the Wessex Football League, England
- West Cork League, Premier Division, Wales
- Premier Division of the Western Football League, England

== Other sports ==
- Premier Division (shinty), Scotland
- Premier Division of the British Hockey League, ice hockey
- Premier Division of the Malaysia Hockey League, field hockey
- Premier Division of the Currie Cup, rugby union, South Africa
- A former name for Division I (US bandy)
