= Murphy's Irish Stout =

Beer brewed in Cork, Ireland

- Type: Stout
- Distributor: Heineken N.V.
- Origin: Ireland
- Alcohol by volume: 4%
- Colour: Black
- Flavour: Black Coffee
- Variants: Murphy's Stout 3.5%
- Website: murphys.com

Murphy's Irish Stout (often simply Murphy's) is a stout brewed at the Murphy's Brewery in Cork, Ireland. It is owned and distributed by the Dutch multinational brewing company Heineken N.V.

== Flavour profile ==
It is brewed to be less heavy and less bitter than its chief competitor Guinness. Its flavour is evocative of caramel and malt, and is described as "a distant relative of chocolate milk". The resemblance to milk extends beyond flavour to texture: Murphy's is free from any hint of carbonation, and is delivered "black as strong cappuccino" with an inch of foam – the head – on top. The water of the River Lee in Cork allegedly gave Murphy's its quality.

== History ==
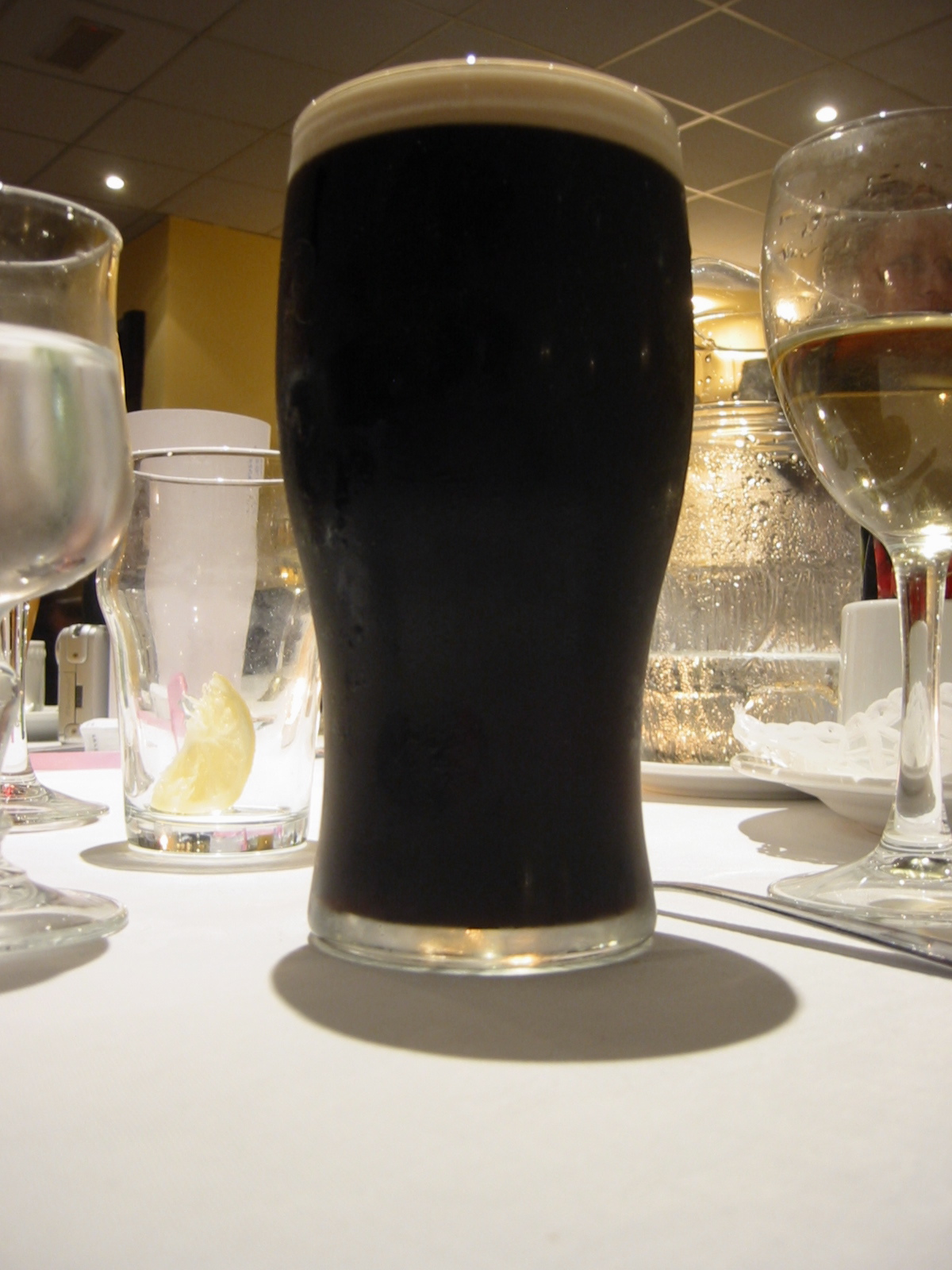
A pint of Murphy's

After years as a solely local stout, the acquisition of the brewery by Heineken in 1983, with a consequent expansion in distribution and international television advertising, exposed Murphy's to the international drinking community. In 1988, Whitbread acquired the distribution and brewing rights for Murphy's in the UK, where it was brewed in the Magor brewery at Magor in Wales. In 2000, these rights went to Interbrew when they acquired Whitbread Brewing Company.

=== Widget ===
In addition to being distributed in kegs, Murphy's is also available in a can. To simulate the appearance and texture of the tap version, cans of Murphy's contain a nitrogen widget, which increases the creaminess of the head when poured.

== Sales ==
Export volumes peaked in the mid-1990s and domestic volume peaked around 2000. The brand is suffering in its native Ireland due to a declining market for stout. It holds a 5 per cent share of the Irish stout market, although this is largely a result of its 28 per cent share of its native Cork market. Murphy's has a limited presence in Ireland outside of Cork. In 2011, 60,000 hectolitres of Murphy's were sold in Ireland.

=== Overseas markets ===
Murphy's was launched on draught in the United Kingdom in 1989. Cans were launched in 1992. It is now rarely found on draught in the UK, although is stocked by many major supermarkets in cans. In the UK it is brewed at Heineken's Tadcaster plant in North Yorkshire for the home market and some export markets. According to Euromonitor International, Murphy's sold 25,000 hl in the UK in 2011. Murphy's held less than five percent of the British stout market in 2016. In 2026, British pub chain, Wetherspoon began selling Murphy's.

Popular export markets include Norway and Italy. In New York the importer is United States Beverage (USB), which is a premium imported/craft beer sales and marketing company located in Stamford, Connecticut.

== Advertising ==
In 1992 Whitbread commissioned well known film director Alan Parker to create a series of adverts shot in and around Cork. The campaign "like the Murphy's I'm not bitter" was successful and marked the peak of the brands success in Great Britain. In 1997 an anime television advertisement was created for Murphy's called "Last Orders". It was created by Production I.G (the creators of Ghost in the Shell), and directed by Hiroyuki Kitakubo. The 60-second film features six fierce samurai who rush through a post-futuristic megalopolis to make it on time for the last orders at their favourite pub. It was the first anime style commercial film ever aired in the UK and Ireland.

=== Sponsorship ===
Murphy's Irish Stout is the main sponsor of the Cork Athletic Union League, an association football league featuring amateur and junior clubs from County Cork. They were also the title sponsor of the Irish Open golf tournament from 1994 to 2002.
