= Ger Canning =

Irish sports commentator

- Born: 10 May 1951 (age 74); Cork, Ireland
- Occupation: Sports commentator
- Employer: Raidió Teilifís Éireann (RTÉ)

Ger Canning is an Irish sports commentator with Raidió Teilifís Éireann (RTÉ).

== Career ==
Ger Canning was born in Cork on 10 May 1951. He was a secondary school teacher at South Presentation school in Cork City when he began his broadcasting career with Cork Local Radio in 1978.

Two years later in 1980 he joined the national broadcaster, Radio Telefís Éireann, as a member of the station's sports department. As a fluent Irish-speaker his first All-Ireland final commentary was on RTÉ 2 in 1981, because the station then had a policy of using the two channels for commentaries in both English and Irish. After Michael O'Hehir's retirement due to ill-health in 1985, Canning became the main Gaelic games commentator on RTÉ television. Micheál Ó Muircheartaigh took over O'Hehir's duties as a radio commentator. To date Canning has broadcast nearly 75 All-Ireland finals (including three in Irish).

Canning commentated on every All-Ireland senior hurling final from 1985 to 2016.

Canning has worked on many sporting events for RTÉ, including:

- Soccer, including five World Cups
- Six Olympic Games
- Basketball
- International rules football
- Greyhound racing
- Olympic hockey qualifying
- League Of Ireland
- National Hurling League
- National Football League (Ireland)

He was assigned commentary duties for the 1985 European Cup Final, before which he witnessed the Heysel Stadium disaster. He was assigned commentary duties for the UEFA Euro 2020.

== Other interests ==
Canning played association football for University College Cork A.F.C. and College Corinthians and played minor and junior Gaelic football for St Finbarr's.

He has lectured in Radio Broadcasting at Colaiste Stiofan Naofa in Cork.
