= Munster Senior League Senior Premier Division =

Association football competition in Ireland

- Country: (Republic of Ireland) Ireland
- Region: Munster
- Number of clubs: 10
- Level on pyramid: 3
- Domestic cup(s): Munster Senior Cup; FAI Cup; FAI Intermediate Cup
- League cup(s): O'Connell Cup (Premier Division only); Keane Cup; Donie Forde Cup; Beamish Cup
- Current champions: Midleton F.C. (5th title) (2024–25)
- Most championships: Cobh Ramblers (15 titles)
- Website: Munster Senior League

The Munster Senior League Senior Premier Division is the top division of the Munster Senior League. It is organised by the Munster Football Association. Together with the Leinster Senior League Senior Division, it forms the third level of the Republic of Ireland football league system. Clubs from this division play in the Munster Senior Cup, the FAI Cup, and the FAI Intermediate Cup. The League Cup for teams in the Senior Premier Division is called the O'Connell Cup. In the past, the winners of the Senior Division were also invited to play in the League of Ireland Cup until the competition's demise. University College Cork A.F.C. were the league's final representative in 2020.

== 2024-25 teams ==
2024-25 Senior Premier Clubs

Team	Home town/suburb	Home ground
Avondale United	Carrigaline/Ballintemple, Cork	Avondale Park
Cobh Wanderers	Cobh, County Cork	Oldchurch Park
College Corinthians	Douglas, Cork	Corinthians Park
Douglas Hall	Douglas, Cork	Moneygourney
Leeds AFC	Ballyvolane, Cork	Leeds Park
Midleton	Midleton, County Cork	Knockgriffin Park
Ringmahon Rangers	Blackrock, Cork	Ringmahon Park
Rockmount	Whitechurch, County Cork	Rockmount Park
St. Mary's AFC	Whites Cross, Cork	St. Mary's Park
UCC	University College Cork	The Mardyke/The Farm

== History ==
=== Early years ===
The original Munster Football Association was founded in 1901 and it is believed that a Munster League was founded within a few years. The 1909–10 season saw six teams representing the Highland Light Infantry, the Royal Welch Fusiliers, the Durham Light Infantry, the Sherwood Foresters, the King's Regiment and Haulbowline all playing in the Munster League First Division. In the Munster Cup the Highland Light Infantry lost 1–0 to the Royal Welsh Fusilers in the final played at Turner's Cross. However this league was effectively disbanded during the First World War and Irish War of Independence era. In 1921 Harry Buckle, a former Ireland international, settled in Cork and began working for the Ford Motor Company. Finding little or no association football activity in the city, Buckle initially founded Fordsons F.C. and then helped found the County Cork–based South Munster League for the team to play in. In addition to playing and coaching with the new club, Buckle also served as president of the Tipperary/Limerick based – North Munster League and helped reform the Munster Football Association. By 1922–23 the South Munster League and North Munster Leagues had effectively merged to become the Munster Senior League. Barrackton United of the South Munster League became the first post–First World War Munster Senior League champions after defeating Cahir Park F.C. of the North Munster League in a play-off.

== List of winners by season ==
Year	Winner	Runner-up
2025–26	Ringmahon Rangers	College Corinthians
2024–25	Midleton	Ringmahon Rangers
2023–24	Midleton	College Corinthians
2022–23	Rockmount	Ringmahon Rangers
2021–22	Rockmount	Carrigaline United
2020–21	Seasons not completed due to Covid-19	
2019–20	Seasons not completed due to Covid-19	
2018-19	UCC	Rockmount
2017-18	Midleton	UCC
2016–17	UCC	Cobh Wanderers
2015–16	Avondale United	UCC
2014–15	Rockmount	College Corinthians
2013–14	Avondale United	UCC
2012–13	Avondale United	UCC
2011–12	Avondale United	Rockmount
2010–11	Rockmount	Douglas Hall
2009–10	Avondale United	Rockmount
2008–09	Avondale United	Rockmount
2007–08	Rockmount	Avondale United
2006–07	Rockmount	Avondale United
2005–06	Rockmount	Castleview
2004–05	Castleview	Avondale United
2003–04	Avondale Utd	St. Mary's
2002–03	College Corinthians	Avondale United
2001–02	Rockmount	Cobh Wanderers
2000–01	College Corinthians	Cobh Wanderers
1999–2000	Rockmount	Cobh Wanderers
1998–99	Everton	College Corinthians
1997–98	College Corinthians	Glasheen
1996–97	College Corinthians	Temple United
1995–96	Avondale United	Everton A.F.C.
1994–95	College Corinthians	Avondale United
1993–94	Everton A.F.C.	Avondale United
1992–93	Avondale United	St. Mary's
1991–92	Midleton	Avondale United
1990–91	Midleton	Cork City B
1989–90	Tramore Athletic	Midleton
1988–89	Tramore Athletic	Avondale United
1987–88	Avondale United	Tramore Athletic
1986–87	Crofton Celtic	College Corinthians
1985–86	Limerick City B	Avondale United
1984–85	Cobh Ramblers	Tramore Athletic
1983–84	Cobh Ramblers	Tramore Athletic
1982–83	Cobh Ramblers	Glasheen
1981–82	Cobh Ramblers	Clonmel Town
1980–81	Cobh Ramblers	Everton A.F.C.
1979–80	Cobh Ramblers	Tramore Athletic
1978–79	Crofton Celtic	UCC
1977–78	Cobh Ramblers	UCC
1976–77	Cobh Ramblers	Crosshaven
1975–76	Cobh Ramblers	Wembley
1974–75	Crosshaven	Tramore Athletic
1973–74	Tramore Athletic	Crosshaven
1972–73	Wembley	Ringmahon Rangers
1971–72	Cobh Ramblers	Ringmahon Rangers
1970–71	Ringmahon Rangers	Wembley
1969–70	Ringmahon Rangers	Wembley
1968–69	Ringmahon Rangers	Cobh Ramblers
1967–68	Ringmahon Rangers	Tramore Athletic
1966–67	Tramore Athletic	Ringmahon Rangers
1965–66	Ringmahon Rangers	Cobh Ramblers
1964–65	Ringmahon Rangers	Limerick B
1963–64	Ringmahon Rangers	Cobh Ramblers
1963–64	Ringmahon Rangers	Cobh Ramblers
1962–63	Cork Hibernians B	Glasheen
1961–62	Glasheen	Ringmahon Rangers
1960–61	Tycor Athletic	Cork Hibernians B
1959–60	Tycor Athletic	Glasheen
1958–59	Albert Rovers	Cobh Ramblers
1957–58	Tycor Athletic	Glasheen
1956–57	Cobh Ramblers	AOH
1955–56	Evergreen United B	Albert Rovers
1954–55	Albert Rovers	Limerick B
1953–54	Albert Rovers	Cobh Ramblers
1952–53	AOH	Pike Rovers
1951–52	Pike Rovers	AOH
1950–51	AOH	Cobh Ramblers
1949–50	AOH	Rockville
1948–49	Freebooters	Rockville
1947–48	Rockville	Cobh Ramblers
1946–47	Rockville	Greenmount Rangers
1945–46	Richmond Celtic	Blackrock
1944–45	unfinished	
1943–44	Cobh Ramblers	Coastal Defence
1942–43	AOH	Cork Bohemians
1941–42	St Kevin's	Cork Bohemians
1940–41	Cork Bohemians	unconfirmed
1939–40	Grattan United	Cork Bohemians
1938–39	Grattan United	Cobh Ramblers
1937–38	Cork Bohemians	Cobh Ramblers
1936–37	Evergreen United	Cobh Ramblers
1935–36	Cobh Ramblers	Steampacket
1934–35	Cobh Ramblers	Steampacket
1933–34^{(Note 1)}	Fermoy	Tramore Rookies
1932–33	Waterford	Cobh Ramblers
1931–32	Cork B	Cobh Ramblers
1930–31	Cork Bohemians	Cork B
1929–30	Fordsons B	Cobh Ramblers
1928–29	Fordsons B	Cobh Ramblers
1927–28	Waterford Celtic	Cork Celtic
1926–27	Barrackton United	Fordsons B
1925–26	Cobh Ramblers	Fordsons B
1924–25	Shandon	Cobh Ramblers
1923–24	Fordsons	Barrackton United
1922–23	Barrackton United	Cork Bohemians
1921–22	Barrackton United	Cahir Park

=== Notes ===
- ^1 Title was shared
