= St. Mary's A.F.C. (Cork) =

- Full name: St. Mary's Association Football Club
- Founded: 1948
- Ground: Kilcully Park
- League: Munster Senior League; Cork Athletic Union League
- Website: http://www.stmarysafc.com/
Home colours	Away colours

St. Mary's A.F.C. is an Irish association football club based in Kilcully Park, near Glanmire and Blackpool, Cork. Their senior men's team currently plays in the Munster Senior League Senior Premier Division. The club has previously played in the Cork Athletic Union League. They have also competed in the FAI Cup, the FAI Intermediate Cup and the Munster Senior Cup.

== History ==
=== Early years ===
St. Mary's A.F.C. was formed in 1948 as a single youth team based in Gurranabraher, taking their name from the Cathedral of St Mary and St Anne. In 1948–49 the club entered a team in the Munster Youth League. The following season, 1949–50, saw the formation of schoolboy and junior teams and the club also entered the Munster Junior League. 1949–50 also saw the club win its first trophy, the Munster Youth Cup, after defeating Clonmel Town 2–1 in the final at Turners Cross.

=== Junior level ===
In 1955–56 St. Mary's joined the Cork Athletic Union League and in their first season won the league's main league cup, the AOH Cup, after defeating Fermoy 4–2 in the final after extra time. During the late 1960s, 1970s and early 1980s, St. Mary's developed into one of the Cork AUL's strongest teams, winning the league title on six occasions and winning the AOH Cup five times. In 1971–72 they also reached the final of the FAI Junior Cup but lost to Talbot (Dublin).

=== Intermediate level ===
In 1986–87 St. Mary's joined the Munster Senior League and in 1988–89, after winning the MSL second level division, they were promoted to the Premier Division. During the mid-1980s St. Mary's also moved away from their original Cork city base to their current home at Kilcully Park.

== Notable former players ==
Republic of Ireland U21 internationals

- (Republic of Ireland) Leon Ayinde

== Honours ==
- Munster Senior League Senior Premier Division
  - Runners-up: 1992–93, 2003–04: 2
- Munster Senior League Senior First Division
  - Winners: 1988–89, 2023-24: 2
- MSL JUNIOR premier league
  - Winners: 2005/06 super cup & junior league cup winners
  - TEAM OF THE Year 2005/06
- Cork Athletic Union League
  - Winners: 1965–66, 1970–71, 1974–75, 1981–82, 1982–83, 1985–86: 6
  - Runners-up: 1971–72, 1973–74, 1975–76, 1976–77, 1977–78, 1980–81, 1984–85: 7
- AOH Cup
  - Winners: 1955–56, 1965–66, 1972–73, 1974–75, 1976–77: 5
  - Runners-up: 1969–70, 1970–71, 1975–76: 3
- FAI Junior Cup
  - Runners-up: 1971–72: 1
- Munster Junior Cup
  - Winners: 1950–51, 1957–58, 1966–67, 1971–72: 1
  - Runners-up: 1965–66, 1969–70: 2
- Munster Youth Cup
  - Winners: 1949–50, 1984–85: 2
  - Runners-up: 1952–53, 1979–80: 2
