= Bandon A.F.C. =

- Full name: Bandon Association Football Club
- Founded: 1970; 56 years ago
- Ground: Town Park; Bandon, County Cork
- Chairman: Richard O'Regan
- Manager: Sean Holland
- League: Munster Senior League; Senior First Division
- Website: www.bandonafc.ie
| Home colours | Away colours |

Bandon A.F.C. is an Irish football club based in Bandon, County Cork. Their senior men's team competes in the Munster Senior League.

The club also have teams in the Cork Schoolboy League, Cork Woman's and Schoolgirl League and Cork Youth League.

The club colours are white and black.

Bandon has qualified for the FAI Cup on multiple occasions, including in 2013 and 2016.

== History ==
Association football, or soccer, was played in Bandon as early as the turn of the 20th century. However, it was around 1950 that a team was entered into a league. The club was known as Bandon A.F.C. and joined the AUL at Division 3, lasting from 1950 to 1955. Between 1955 and 1970, soccer was non-existent in the town.

In 1970, Bandon A.F.C. was resurrected by Con Waugh, Donal Crowley and Tom Griffin. The three men organised a public meeting to elect a committee for the club. The committee decided to enter a team in the Cork Athletic Union League (AUL) under the Bandon A.F.C. name. The club's first competitive game took place later that year in the Saxone Cup.

Bandon had to withdraw their team from Division 1 in the Cork AUL in the 1987–88 season and were automatically relegated as a result.

In 1997, the club entered a women's team into the Cork Ladies League.

2013 saw a series of firsts for the club. In the league, the senior men's team were promoted to the Senior Premier Division, the top tier of the Munster Senior League (MSL), for the first time. The men's team also made it to the second round of the FAI Cup for the first time and were drawn against League of Ireland side Shelbourne F.C. who beat them 0–3. Despite their first season in the Munster top flight ending in relegation, the club bounced back to win the 2014–15 MSL Senior First Division. In 2016, the club again qualified for the FAI Cup and managed a draw against Ringmahon Rangers in the first round. However, Bandon were knocked out on penalties in the replay.

Manager Richie Holland stepped down in July 2019. Sean Holland, Richie's brother, was appointed as his replacement.

== Honours ==
Munster Senior League

- Division 1
  - Winners: 2014–15
  - Runners-up: 2012–13
- Division 2
  - Runners-up: 2010–11

See full list of club honours here
