= Little Island, Cork =

Civil parish near Cork city, Ireland

Little Island An tOileán Beag
- Civil Parish
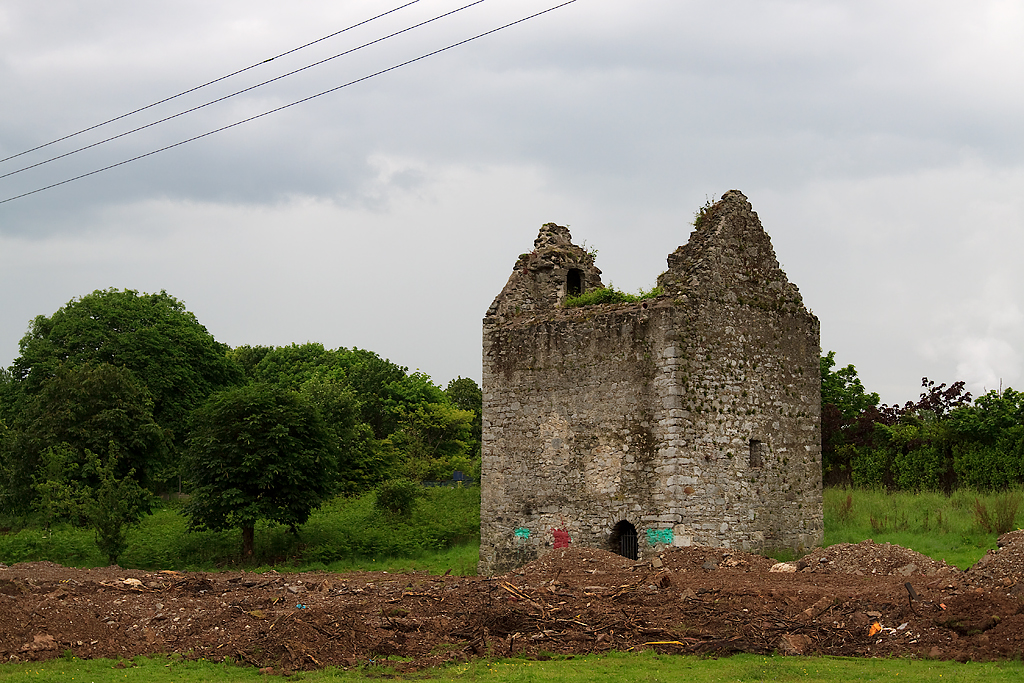
- 15th or 16th century tower house, known locally as Wallingstown Castle

- Location in Ireland
- Coordinates: 51°54′00″N 08°21′00″W
- Country: Ireland
- Province: Munster
- County: County Cork

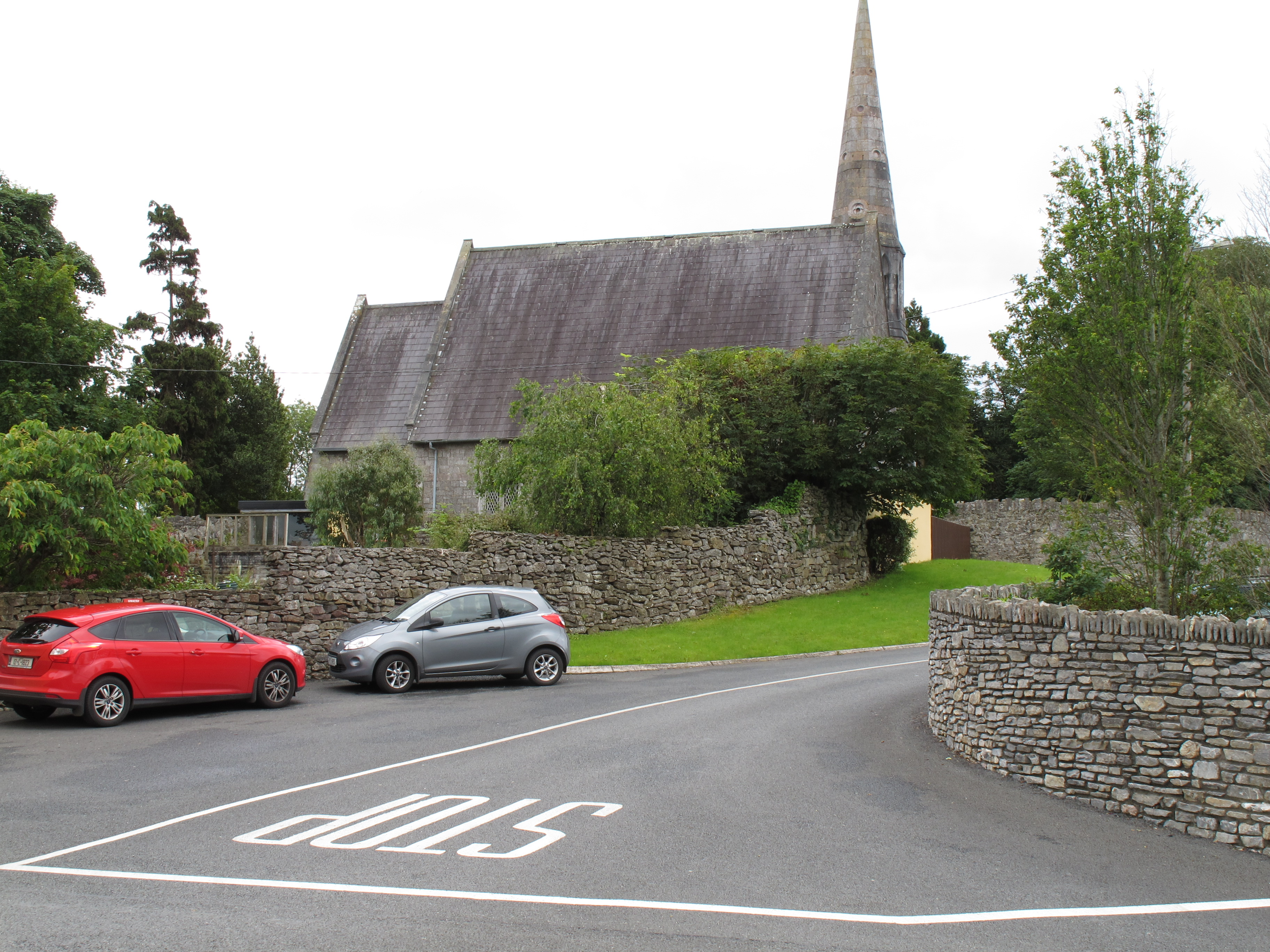
St Lappan's Church of Ireland Church dates to 1856 and is named for Saint Lappan of Cork

Little Island, County Cork, is a civil parish and mainly industrial area to the east of Cork city in Ireland. It is no longer an island since the northern channel separating it from the mainland has filled over. To the west and south is Lough Mahon, part of Cork Harbour; across a channel to the east is Fota Island. Little Island is within the Dáil constituency of Cork North-Central.

== History ==
The parish of Little Island dates to at least the seventh century, and tidal mills have been excavated dating to c. 630 AD. By the fourteenth century, the parish was known as De Insula, meaning "of the island". Henry Purdon, MP for Charleville, lived here in the eighteenth century. The current Church of Ireland parish church was built in 1865 in the Gothic Revival style. A limestone quarry on Little Island was the source of thousands of tons of limestone annually, which were used in the construction of public buildings nationally, including Cork's City Hall and Holy Trinity Church, as well as Newfoundland's first legislature, the Colonial Building in St. John's.

Ancient protected structures, as recorded on the Record of Monuments and Places, include examples of fulacht fiadh, middens, corn-drying kilns, the remains of a medieval church and graveyard, and the 15th or 16th century tower house known locally as Wallingstown Castle.

== Development ==
A number of Cork's pharmaceutical companies are based on the island. The main drainage wastewater treatment plant for Cork City was also opened in the area in 2004.

Since the 1990s, development has grown, with retail and commercial spaces opened at Little Island Business Park and East Gate Retail Park. As of 2017, the Little Island Business Association reported that there were approximately one thousand businesses operating in the area. Over seven thousand people were employed in the area, which was described as one of Ireland's "industrial powerhouses" as of April 2018.

Cork Golf Club and Leeside A.F.C are also based on the island.

== Transport ==
The N25 Cork-Rosslare road is built on the infilled channel between Little Island and Glounthaune. The R623 is an area loop road from the N25.

The Cork-Cobh railway line skirts the island to the north and west. It includes Little Island railway station, which opened on 10 November 1859. It has direct rail services to Cork, Glounthane, Cobh, Carrigtwohill and Midleton.

== Townlands ==
The townlands of Little Island include Ballytrasna, Carrigrenan, Castleview, Clashavodig, Courtstown, Harper's Island, and Wallingstown.
