= Kinsale A.F.C. =

- Kinsale A.F.C. logo
- Full name: Kinsale Association Football Club
- Founded: 1935
- Ground: Madden Park; Kinsale, Ireland
- Coordinates: 51.6986391°N 8.497700399999985°W
- League: Munster Senior League Senior Division 2
- 2024–25: Senior Second Division, 9th of 12
- Website: www.kinsaleafc.net
colours

Kinsale Association Football Club is a soccer club situated in the town of Kinsale, near the historical site of Charles Fort and within approximately 18 miles from Cork City, Ireland. Their senior men's team competes in the Munster Senior League and, as of May 2025, plays in the Senior Second Division, the fifth tier on the Irish football pyramid.

== History ==
Kinsale A.F.C. was founded in 1935.

== Grounds ==
Following discussions with the local council in 1985, the club obtained facilities in Charles Fort in Kinsale. The club now has two pitches. The grounds were renamed Madden Park after the Honorary President, Mr. Paddy Madden.

== Club background ==
As well as the men's team that compete in the Munster Senior League, there is also a junior programme, founded in 1998, which has 300 participants in U7, U8, U9, U10, U11, U13, U14, U15, and U16 categories. Originally playing in the West Cork League, the underage boys are now part of the Cork Schoolboys League. The girls teams play in the Cork Women's and Schoolgirls Soccer League.

The club caters for boys and girls aged 5 to 19.

== Recent success ==
Some Kinsale players have represented Cork Athletic Union League in the Oscar Traynor Inter-League Cup. These include;

- Derek McCarthy
- Stephen O'Donovan
- Pat O'Regan
- Michael Bradfield
- Derek Varian

All of whom received winners medals with in 2009. Additionally, in the same year, Derek Varian and Derek McCarthy represented the Ireland national team at Junior level.

== Honours ==
- Cork Athletic Union League
  - Winners: 2002–03, 2003–04, 2004–05, 2005–06, 2009–10, 2010–11: 6
  - Runners-up: 2006–07, 2008–09: 2
