= Rockmount A.F.C. =

Association football club, County Cork, Ireland

Coordinates: 51°59′4.7″N 8°30′54.5″W

- Full name: Rockmount Association Football Club
- Founded: 1924; 102 years ago
- Ground: Rockmount Park, Whitechurch, County Cork
- League: Munster Senior League; Cork Athletic Union League
- Website: rockmountafc.ie
Home colours	Away colours

Rockmount Association Football Club is an Irish association football club based in Whitechurch, County Cork.

Their senior men's team currently plays in the Munster Senior League. They are the current Munster Senior League and FAI Intermediate Cup Champions having won both titles back to back in the 2021–22 and 2022–23 seasons respectively. They have also competed in the FAI Cup, the League of Ireland Cup, the FAI Intermediate Cup and the Munster Senior Cup. They have previously played in the Cork Athletic Union League. The club also fields teams in various junior and youth leagues. Their schoolboy section regularly fields up to ten teams in the Cork Schoolboy's League.

== History ==
=== Early years ===
Rockmount A.F.C. was formed in 1924 in the Commons Road area of Cork city. The club was named in honour of a local big house, called Rockmount House, after the owner agreed to help with the purchase of jerseys for the club. In 1924–25, Rockmount joined the Cork City Minor League. In 1926–27 Rockmount also competed in the Munster Junior League and won the club's first trophy – the Munster Youth Cup. Other members of the Munster Junior League included Cork Bohemians, Fordsons, Cobh Ramblers and Mallow United plus two clubs who shared their name with future League of Ireland clubs, Cork Celtic and Cork City. Although success in the league was not forthcoming, Rockmount won the Munster Junior Cup in 1929–30 and again in 1932–33. However, in 1935 the club suspended all activities.

Rockmount A.F.C. was revived in 1951–52, initially as a schoolboy team. In 1955–56, a junior team was also entered in the Cork Athletic Union League. Rockmount finished as runners up in the Cork AUL in 1959–60, 1965–66 and 1967–68 before they won the title in 1975–76. In 1967–68 they also won the Cork AUL's main league cup competition, the AOH Cup. In the final they defeated Everton 2–1 in a replay after the first game finished 3–3.

=== Provincial level ===
Rockmount later joined the Munster Senior League and during the 2000s and 2010s they emerged as one of the league's strongest teams, regularly winning the Senior Premier Division title. They won their first title in 1999–2000 and in 2014–15 they won their sixth. Rockmount have been Munster Senior Cup finalists on four occasions, each time losing out to League of Ireland opponents. In both 1997–98 and 2001–02 they lost out to Cork City. In 2008–09 they lost 2–1 to Waterford United. In the quarter-finals of the 2015–16 cup Rockmount drew 1–1 with Cork City before winning the tie 4–3 on penalties. In the semi-final they defeated Ringmahon Rangers 2–1 but then lost the final to Cobh Ramblers by the same score. In June 2026, the club began construction of a new artificial turf pitch with spectator facilities.

=== National cups ===
In 1986–87 Rockmount were FAI Cup quarter-finalists. In the round of 32 they defeated Monaghan United 3–1 away from home. In the round of sixteen they took two games to defeat Mervue United. After a 2–2 draw, Rockmount won the replay 1–0. In the quarter-finals they lost 2–0 to Dundalk. Rockmount were also quarter-finalists in the 2004 FAI Cup. In the round of sixteen they again knocked out Monaghan United, this time defeating them 2–0. In the quarter-finals they held Waterford United to a 2–2 draw at Waterford RSC before losing the replay 2–1. Rockmount have been FAI Intermediate Cup cup finalists on five occasions. In 1998–99 in their first final, they defeated Garda F.C. 2–0 at Turners Cross. Between 2002 and 2003 and 2004–05 they played in three successive finals. In the 2002–03 final they lost to 2–1 to Belgrove at Whitehall Stadium after a replay. In 2003–04 they won the cup for a second time after defeating Bluebell United in the final at Richmond Park. However, in 2004–05 they failed to retain the cup and lost 1–0 in the final to Wayside Celtic at the Carlisle Grounds. In 2007–08 Rockmount won the cup for a third time following a 2–0 win at Turners Cross over fellow Munster Senior League club, Douglas Hall. After winning the Munster Senior League title in 2014–15, Rockmount were invited to participate in the 2016 League of Ireland Cup. In the first round they lost 4–0 to Waterford United at the Waterford RSC.

== Ground ==
Rockmount play their home games at Rockmount Park in Whitechurch, County Cork, about 12 kilometres north of Cork city centre. They previously played home games at rented facilities in Kilcully, before moving to their current home in 1983. Rockmount Park features four pitches. An all weather pitch was opened in 2010.

== Notable former players ==
Republic of Ireland international

- (Republic of Ireland) Roy Keane
- (Republic of Ireland) Caoimhín Kelleher

Republic of Ireland U21 international

- (Republic of Ireland) Shane O'Connor
- Denis O’Sullivan

== Honours ==
- Munster Senior League
  - Winners: 1998–99, 2000–01, 2001–02, 2005–06, 2006–07, 2009–10, 2010–11, 2014–15, 2021–22, 2022-23: 10
  - Runners up: 2004–05, 2007–08, 2008–09, 2011–12, 2018-19: 5
- FAI Intermediate Cup
  - Winners: 1998–99, 2003–04, 2007–08, 2021–22, 2022-23: 5
  - Runners up: 2002–03, 2004–05: 2
- Munster Senior Cup
  - Winners: 2019-20: 1
  - Runners up: 1997–98, 2001–02, 2008–09, 2015–16: 4
- FAI Tom Hand Memorial Cup
  - Winners: 2021-22: 1
- Munster Junior Cup
  - Winners: 1929–30, 1932–33: 2
- Munster Youth Cup
  - Winners: 1926–27: 1
  - Runners up: 1988–89: 1
- Cork Athletic Union League
  - Winners: 1975–76: 1
  - Runners up: 1959–60, 1965–66, 1967–68: 3
- AOH Cup
  - Winners: 1967–68: 1
