= University College Cork A.F.C. =

UCC A.F.C.
- Full name: University College Cork A.F.C.
- Nicknames: The Academicals; The Acas
- Founded: 1952
- Ground: The Mardyke; The Farm
- Owner: University College Cork
- League: FAI National League; Munster Senior League; Cork Athletic Union League; FAI College & Universities Football League
- Website: soccer.ucc.ie
Home colours	Away colours

University College Cork Association Football Club is an Irish association football club based in Cork. It was founded in 1952 by students at University College Cork. Its senior men's team plays in the third national tier FAI National League and in the regional Munster Senior League Senior Premier Division. They have also previously competed in the Collingwood, Crowley and Harding Cups, the FAI Intermediate Cup, FAI Cup and FAI Junior Cup. As of 2023, UCC A.F.C. was also fielding teams in the Munster Senior League, the Cork Athletic Union League, and the FAI College & Universities Football League.

== History ==
=== Intervarsity ===
UCC A.F.C. is affiliated to the Irish Universities Football Union and competes in three annual intervarsity competitions – the Collingwood Cup, the Crowley Cup and the Harding Cup. UCC A.F.C. first won the Collingwood Cup in 1974. Then, during the 1990s, they won it twice in a row – 1990 and 1991. The club won it again in 2000 and then between 2002 and 2005 retained it four times in a row. In 2011, with a team managed by John Caulfield, UCC won the Collingwood Cup again. In 2015, UCC A.F.C. had one of its most successful intervarsity seasons. In addition to winning the senior Collingwood Cup, they also won the Crowley Cup, the reserve team competition, and the Harding Cup, featuring teams made up of freshers or first year students. UCC A.F.C. actually entered two teams in both the Crowley Cup and the Harding Cup. In February 2015 UCC A.F.C. hosted the Harding Cup. The UCC freshers team defeated teams representing Dublin City University, NUI Galway and University of Limerick over three consecutive days to claim the cup. In the final played at The Mardyke on 8 February, UCC defeated Limerick 1–0. Later in the same month the UCC senior team won the Collingwood Cup. In the quarter finals they defeated defending champions Maynooth University, managed by Ger O’Brien, 7–6 on penalties. In the semi-final they defeated NUI Galway 1–0. The final, which was played at Eamon Deacy Park on 26 February, saw UCC defeat Dublin University 3–1. In March UCC completed an Intervarsity treble when they also won the Crowley Cup. In 2015 they completed an Intervarsity treble – winning the Collingwood Cup, the Crowley Cup and the Harding Cup.

=== MSL and National Cups ===
In addition to Intervarsity wins, UCC A.F.C. has had some success in the Munster Senior League. In 2011–12, they won the Senior First Division and as a result were promoted to the Senior Premier Division. In 2013–14,2016–17 and 2018–19 they were the Senior Premier Division champions. As a result, they qualified to compete in the 2015 League of Ireland Cup. After knocking out League of Ireland First Division teams Wexford Youths and Cobh Ramblers in early rounds, they reached the quarter-finals where they were defeated by the holders, Dundalk, at The Mardyke.

Following the club's MSL Premier Division win in 2017, they qualified for the 2018 League of Ireland Cup, losing 4–1 to Premier Division side Waterford in the first round at the RSC. In July 2025, they faced St Patrick's Athletic in the 2025 FAI Cup, losing 8–0 at Richmond Park.

=== FAI National League ===
In 2025, the club was announced as one of the 15 teams participating in the inaugural season of the FAI National League, the third tier of the Irish football system.

== Squad ==
Note: Flags indicate national team as defined under FIFA eligibility rules; some limited exceptions apply. Players may hold more than one non-FIFA nationality. Squad correct as of May 2026.

No.	Pos.	Nation	Player
—	GK	IRL	Robert Barry
—	GK	IRL	Kacper Reszka
—	DF	IRL	Garvan Twomey
—	DF	IRL	Shane O'Neill
—	DF	IRL	Ross Cunningham
—	DF	IRL	John O'Donovan
—	DF	NGR	Oluwafisayo Tonade
—	DF	IRL	Ronan Murphy
—	DF	IRL	Daniel McCarthy
—	DF	NGR	Ramsey Miller
—	DF	WAL	Samuel Bailey
—	MF	GER	Elias Zippel

No.	Pos.	Nation	Player
—	MF	IRL	Darragh Bowdren
—	MF	IRL	Evan Lynch
—	MF	IRL	Ronan O'Shea
—	MF	IRL	Noah Sowinski
—	MF	IRL	D.O'Brien
—	MF	IRL	Éanna Fitzgerald
—	FW	IRL	Conor O'Sullivan
—	FW	IRL	Conor O'Sullivan
—	FW	IRL	Emmanuel Olawuni
—	FW	IRL	Derry Howard
—		ESP	Jorge Ismael García Díaz
—		IRL	Finn Bond-Smith

== Home grounds ==
UCC A.F.C. play their home games at two grounds. Their traditional home has been The Mardyke. However they also played at the UCC Sports Grounds at Curraheen Road, Bishopstown. This ground is commonly referred to as The Farm.

== Quarry Cup ==
The club hosts an annual tournament known as the Quarry Cup as a means to raise funds. It is a knockout competition featuring nine-a-side teams made up of University College Cork students playing forty minute games.

== Honours ==
- Munster Senior League Senior Premier Division
  - Winners:2016–17, 2018–19 : 2
  - Runners-up: 1977–78, 1978–79, 2012–13: 3
- Munster Senior League Senior First Division
  - Winners: 2011–12
- Collingwood Cup
  - Winners: 1974, 1978, 1986, 1990, 1991, 2000, 2002, 2003, 2004, 2005, 2011, 2015, 2017, 2019 : 14
- Crowley Cup
  - Winners: 1996, 2000, 2009, 2015 : 4
- Harding Cup
  - Winners: 1995, 1993, 1989, 1982, 1981, 1972, 1995, 2015: 8
- Corinthian Cup
  - Winners: 2009–10
- City Challenge Cup
  - Winners: 2018–19

== Notable former players ==
- (Republic of Ireland) Ger Canning – RTÉ sports commentator
- (Republic of Ireland) John Meyler – Cork GAA hurler
- (Republic of Ireland) Sean McLoughlin – Hull City FC footballer

== Notable former managers ==
- (Republic of Ireland) John Caulfield

== Related teams ==
- College Corinthians A.F.C. was founded in 1971 by former players no longer eligible to play for UCC A.F.C. after they graduated. They play in the Munster Senior League.
- UCC Diaspora F.C. is based in the London Borough of Wandsworth and was also founded by former UCC A.F.C. players. It fields three teams in the Wimbledon & District Football League.
- UCC United FC is a team founded by staff and employees of University College Cork as opposed to students. They play in the Cork Business & Shipping League. In 2012–13 they were winners of the CBSL First Division and in 2014–15 they won the CBSL Premier Cup. In the 2017 – 18 season, they were crowned Champions of the CBSL Premier Division.
