= Cork Athletic Union League =

- Founded: 1947
- Country: (Republic of Ireland) Ireland
- Confederation: Munster Football Association
- Divisions: Premier; Premier A League 1 League 1A; League 2 League 2A; League 3 League 3A
- Number of clubs: 70 (2016–17)
- Level on pyramid: 7–11
- Domestic cup: FAI Junior Cup
- League cup(s): AOH Cup; Linnane League Cup; City Challenge Cup; County Cup; St Michael's Cup; Saxone Cup; President’s Cup; Corinthians Cup
- Most championships: Temple United (9)

The Cork Athletic Union League, also known as the Cork AUL, is an association football league featuring amateur and junior clubs from County Cork. Its top division, the Premier League, is a seventh level division in the Republic of Ireland football league system. The Cork AUL is currently sponsored by Murphy's Irish Stout. It is affiliated to the Munster Football Association. Clubs in the Cork AUL also compete in the FAI Junior Cup. Three League of Ireland clubs – Cobh Ramblers, Cork Hibernians and Albert Rovers – were originally members of the Cork AUL.

== History ==
=== Inaugural season ===
The Cork Athletic Union Football League, originally known as the Cork City and County Athletic Union Junior League, was founded in 1947. Its founding members included two future members of the League of Ireland, Cobh Ramblers and Albert Rovers and the inaugural champions, Mortonville. The other eleven original members were Maymount Rovers, Prospect Rovers, Grattan, Ballinlough, Clapton Celtic, Green Rovers, Blackrock, Mountview, Marine Services, Cork Spinning and Ladyswell Brewery.

Leeside A.F.C. joined the Cork Athletic Union League (AUL) for the 1968–69 season.

=== Munster Senior League ===
In addition to Cobh Ramblers, Cork Hibernians and Albert Rovers joining the League of Ireland, a number of current Munster Senior League clubs were also originally members of the Cork AUL before switching from junior to intermediate football. Five of the Cork AUL's most successful clubs – Temple United, Kinsale, St. Mary's, Wembley and Castleview – all subsequently joined the MSL. Other clubs to switch from the Cork AUL to the MSL include Avondale United, Mallow United, Tramore Athletic, College Corinthians, Ringmahon Rangers, Everton and Rockmount.

=== 2020s ===
In August 2025, three new teams were added to the league. Sullane F.C. from Ballyvourney joined for the first time along with Inch United from Killeagh and Mallow Town. In addition, Grattan United, Glenthorn Celtic, Los Zarcos and Mogeely F.C. entered reserve sides.

== League pyramid ==
The league's management committee decides the number of divisions and number of teams in each division. No club may have two teams in any one division of the league. A system of promotion and relegation applies in all divisions and is decided by the management committee before the start of each season. The below format has been agreed for the 2025–26 season:

County Level	League(s) / division(s)
1	Cork AUL Premier League 8 clubs – 2 or 3 relegations
2	Cork AUL Premier A League 6 clubs – 2 or 3 promotions, 0 relegations
3	Cork AUL League 1 8 clubs – 3 promotions, 1 relegation
4	Cork AUL League 2 10 clubs – 2 promotions, 1 relegation
5	Cork AUL League 3 14 clubs – 4 promotions

== Cup competitions ==
In its inaugural season, 1947–48 the Cork AUL featured three league cup competitions, the City Challenge Cup, the Saxone Cup and the Miniature Cup. The Cork AUL's main league cup is the AOH Cup which was presented to the league in 1951 by the Ancient Order of Hibernians.

Clubs in the Cork AUL also compete in the FAI Junior Cup. In 1973–74 St. Michael's of Tipperary won the competition while playing in the Cork AUL. Six other Cork AUL clubs – Castleview, Blackrock, Douglas, Everton, St. Mary's and Temple United – have all been finalists. Between 1961–62 and 1965–66 Cork AUL clubs were runners-up in four out of five seasons.

== Representative team ==
The senior Cork AUL representative team competes in the Oscar Traynor Trophy against other representative teams of similar junior leagues. They have won the competition on two occasions, in 1965–66 and again in 2008–09. They were also runners-up in 1994–95.

FAI Oscar Traynor Trophy

Season	Champions	Runners-up
1965–66	Cork AUL	Leinster Junior League
1994–95	Athletic Union League (Dublin)	Cork AUL
2008–09	Cork AUL	Athletic Union League (Dublin)

== Sponsors ==
The main sponsors of the Cork AUL are Murphy's Irish Stout. Other sponsors include the Evening Echo.

== Clubs ==
Murphy's Irish Stout Premier League (as of 2025)

Club	Home town/suburb	Home ground
Castleview A	Mayfield, Cork	O'Sullivan Park
City Wanderers	Bishopstown	MTU Cork City
Coachford A	Coachford	
Donoughmore Athletic	Donoughmore	Fr. Condon Memorial Field
Grattan United A		O'Neill Park
Knocknaheeny Celtic	Knocknaheeny	
UCC	Cork	The Farm
Village United	Mayfield, Cork	Silverheights Park

== List of winners by season ==
Season	Champions	Runners-up
1947–48	Mortonville	Cobh Ramblers
1948–49	Maymount Rovers	Green Rovers
1949–50	St Finbarr's Celtic	Mortonville
1950–51	Crosshaven	
1951–52	Crosshaven	Collins
1952–53	Wembley	Mallow United
1953–54	Wembley	Fermoy
1954–55	Transport	Wembley
1955–56	Wembley	Blackrock
1956–57	Fermoy	Wembley
1957–58	Fermoy	Blackrock
1958–59	Ringmahon Rangers	Wembley
1959–60	Ringmahon Rangers	Rockmount
1960–61	Ringmahon Rangers	Castleview
1961–62	Castleview	
1962–63	Wembley	Castleview
1963–64	Blackrock	St Michael's (Cork)
1964–65	Wembley	Ringmahon Rangers
1965–66	St. Mary's	Rockmount
1966–67	Everton	Wembley
1967–68	Castleview	Rockmount
1968–69	Castleview	Ringmahon
1969–70	Crosshaven	
1970–71	St. Mary's	Wembley
1971–72	Crosshaven	St. Mary's
1972–73	Castleview	Wembley
1973–74	St. Michael's (Tipp)	St. Mary's
1974–75	St. Mary's	Castleview
1975–76	Rockmount	St. Mary's
1976–77	Castleview	St. Mary's
1977–78	Crofton Celtic	St. Mary's
1978–79	Castleview	Midleton
1979–80	Casement Celtic	Cobh Ramblers
1980–81	Casement Celtic	St. Mary's
1981–82	St. Mary's	Casement Celtic
1982–83	St. Mary's	Ballincollig
1983–84	Douglas Hall	Ballincollig
1984–85	Temple United	St. Mary's
1985–86	St. Mary's	Douglas Hall
1986–87	Temple United	Waterloo
1987–88	Temple United	Ballincollig
1988–89	Temple United	Avondale United
1989–90	Temple United	Ballincollig
1990–91	Ballincollig	Greenmount Rangers
1991–92	Temple United	Castleview
1992–93	Temple United	Ballincollig
1993–94	Temple United	Castleview
1994–95	Temple United	Mayfield United
1995–96	Greenmount Rangers	Coachford
1996–97	Greenmount Rangers	
1997–98	Greenmount Rangers	Coachford
1998–99	Greenmount Rangers	Leeside
1999–2000	Blarney United	Leeside
2000–01	Greenmount Rangers	Coachford
2001–02	Blarney United	Leeside
2002–03	Kinsale	Blarney United
2003–04	Kinsale	Blarney United
2004–05	Kinsale	Maymount Celtic
2005–06	Kinsale	Villa United
2006–07	Grattan United	Kinsale
2007–08	Grattan United	Park United
2008–09	Wilton United A	Kinsale A
2009–10	Kinsale	Leeside
2010–11	Kinsale	Wilton United
2011–12	Park United A	Killumney United
2012–13	Coachford A	Park United A (Note)
2013–14	Park United A	Killumney United
2014–15	Grattan United A	Glenthorn Celtic A
2015–16	Park United A	Village United
2016–17	Grattan United A	Pearse Celtic A
2017-18	Grattan United A	Glenthorn Celtic A
2018-19	Knocknaheeney Celtic A	Coachford
2019-20		

== List of winners by club ==
Club	Titles	Seasons
Temple United	9	1984–85, 1986–87, 1987–88, 1988–89, 1989–90, 1991–92, 1992–93, 1993–94, 1994–95
Kinsale	6	2002–03, 2003–04, 2004–05, 2005–06, 2009–10, 2010–11
St. Mary's	6	1965–66, 1970–71, 1974–75, 1981–82, 1982–83, 1985–86
Castleview	5	1961–62, 1967–68, 1972–73, 1976–77, 1978–79
Greenmount Rangers	5	1995–96, 1996–97, 1997–98, 1998–99, 2000–01
Wembley	5	1952–53, 1953–54, 1955–56, 1962–63, 1964–65
Crosshaven	4	1950–51, 1951–52, 1969–70, 1971–72
Grattan United	3	2006–07, 2007–08, 2014–15
Park United	3	2011–12, 2013–14, 2015–16
Ringmahon Rangers	3	1958–59, 1959–60, 1960–61
Blarney United	2	1999–2000, 2001–02
Casement Celtic	2	1979–80, 1980–81
Fermoy	2	1956–57, 1957–58
Ballincollig	1	1990–91
Blackrock	1	1963–64
Crofton Celtic	1	1977–78
Coachford	1	2012–13
Everton	1	1966–67
Douglas Hall	1	1983–84
Maymount Rovers	1	1948–49
Mortonville	1	1947–48
Rockmount	1	1975–76
St Finbarr's Celtic	1	1949–50
St. Michael's	1	1973–74
Transport	1	1954–55
Wilton United	1	2008–09
