= Munster Senior Cup (association football) =

- Organiser(s): Munster Football Association
- Founded: 1901
- Region: Munster
- Current champions: Cork City F.C.
- Most championships: Cork City (20)

The Munster Senior Cup is an association football cup competition organized by the Munster Football Association. Entrants include League of Ireland clubs such as Cork City, Cobh Ramblers and Waterford who are affiliated to the MFA, as well as clubs from the Munster Senior League.

== History ==
Like the Munster Football Association itself, the Munster Senior Cup was originally inaugurated in 1901. It was initially dominated by British Army regimental teams. Among the early winners were the Royal Engineers, one of the pioneering teams of association football in England. They had played in the first FA Cup Final in 1871–72 before winning it for the first time in 1875. During the First World War/Irish War of Independence era there were no competitions, but the cup was revived in 1922–23. Since 1922 clubs playing in the League of Ireland have dominated the winners' list and the competitions two most successful clubs have been Cork City and Waterford. However, in recent times Munster Senior League clubs have been regular finalists and in 2013–14 Douglas Hall were winners.

== List of finals ==
Season	Winner	Score	Runners-up	Venue
1901–02	6th Prov. Battalion	1-0	Awbeg Rovers	Buttevant
1902–03	Royal Engineers			
1903–04	Cork Celtic ^{(Note 1)}			
1904–05	Manchester Regiment			
1905–06	3rd Dragoon Guards			
1906–07 ^{(Note 2)}				
1907–08	Royal Field Artillery			
1908–09	Royal Welsh Fusiliers			
1909–10	Royal Welsh Fusiliers	1–0	Highland Light Infantry	Turners Cross
1910–11	Rifle Brigade			
1911–12	North Staffordshire Regiment			
1912–13	King's Own Yorkshire Light Infantry			
1913–14	Rifle Brigade			
1922–23	Fordsons		Shandon	
1923–24	Fordsons		Barrackton United	
1924–25	Cobh Ramblers		Cork City ^{(Note 3)}	
1925–26	Fordsons		Cork Bohemians	
1926–27	Cork Bohemians	2–1	Cahir Park	Victoria Cross
1927–28	Cork Bohemians		Barrackton United	
1928–29	Fordsons		Fermoy	
1929–30	Fordsons B		Cork Bohemians	
1930–31	Cork Bohemians		Cork B	
1931–32	Cork Bohemians		Barrackton United	
1932–33	Cork Bohemians		Waterford	
1933–34	Cork		Southern Rovers	
1934–35	Waterford		Cobh Ramblers	
1935–36	Southern Rovers		Grattan United	
1936–37	Cork		Cobh Ramblers	
1937–38	Limerick		Cork	
1938–39	Cork City	4–0	Limerick	The Mardyke
1939–40 ^{(Note 2)}				
1940–41	Cork United		Evergreen United	
1941–42	St. Kevin's		Dunlop	
1942–43	Cork Bohemians		Richmond Celtic	
1943–44	Cobh Ramblers		Coastal Defence	
1944–45	Cork United B		Blackrock	
1945–46	Waterford		Cork United	
1946–47	Cork United		Waterford	
1947–48	Waterford		Cork United	
1948–49	Limerick		Waterford	
1949–50	Albert Rovers ^{(Note 4)}		Cork Athletic	
1950–51	Cork Athletic		Limerick	
1951–52	Evergreen United		Waterford	
1952–53	Cork Athletic		Limerick	
1953–54	Limerick		Albert Rovers	
1954–55	Cork Athletic		Waterford	
1955–56	Waterford		Cork Athletic	
1956–57	Waterford		Evergreen United	
1957–58 ^{(Note 2)}				
1958–59	Limerick		Evergreen United	
1959–60	Cork Celtic		Waterford	
1960–61	Cork Hibernians		Waterford	
1961–62	Cork Celtic		Limerick	
1962–63	Limerick		Cork Hibernians	
1963–64	Cork Celtic		Limerick	
1964–65	Cork Hibernians		Cork Celtic	
1965–66	Waterford		Cobh Ramblers	
1966–67	Waterford		Cork Hibernians	
1967–68	Cork Hibernians		Limerick	
1968–69	Cork Hibernians		Waterford	
1969–70	Cork Hibernians		Waterford	
1970–71	Cork Hibernians		Limerick	
1971–72	Cork Celtic		Waterford	
1972–73	Cork Hibernians		Limerick	
1973–74	Cork Celtic		Limerick	
1974–75	Cork Hibernians		Cork Celtic	
1975–76	Waterford		Cork Hibernians	
1976–77	Limerick		Cork Celtic	
1977–78	Cork Alberts ^{(Note 4)}		Limerick	
1978–79	Cobh Ramblers		Limerick	
1979–80	Cork United ^{(Note 4)}		Crosshaven	
1980–81	Waterford		Tramore Athletic	
1981–82	Cork United ^{(Note 4)}		Waterford	
1982–83	Cobh Ramblers		Clonmel Town	
1983–84	Limerick City	1–0	Cobh Ramblers	St Colman's Park
1984–85	Limerick City	2–2	Cobh Ramblers	St Colman's Park
1985–86	Waterford United	4-0	Wembley	Turner's Cross
1986–87	Waterford United	2-1	Limerick City	Kilcohan Park
1987–88	Cork City	1-0	Cobh Ramblers	Turner's Cross
1988–89	Limerick City	1-0	Cork City	Rathbane
1989–90	Cork City	3-0	Tramore Athletic	Turner's Cross
1990–91	Cork City	3-0	Limerick City	
1991–92	Cork City	6-1	Everton	
1992–93	Cork City	3-1	Fermoy	
1993–94	Cork City	2-2	Cobh Ramblers	
1994–95	Limerick	2-1	Cork City	
1995–96	Waterford Crystal	1-0	Cork City	
1996–97	Cork City	2-0	Cobh Wanderers	
1997–98	Cork City	1–0	Rockmount	
1998–99	Cork City		Waterford United	
1999–2000	Cork City	5-0	Cobh Ramblers	
2000–01	Cork City	3-0	College Corinthians	
2001–02	Cork City	2-0	Rockmount	
2002–03	Cork City	1-0	Waterford United	
2003–04	Cork City	2–0	Carrick United	Ozier Park
2004–05	Cork City	2-0	Avondale United	
2005–06	Limerick	0-0	Cobh Ramblers	
2006–07	Waterford United	2–0	Passage	Turners Cross
2007–08	Cork City	1–0	Cobh Ramblers	St Colman's Park
2008–09	Waterford United	2–1	Rockmount	Turners Cross
2009–10	Waterford United	3–1	Midleton	Waterford RSC
2010–11	Carrick United	1-0	Limerick	
2011–12	Limerick	1–0	Cork City	Jackman Park
2012–13	Waterford United	3-0	Avondale United	
2013–14	Douglas Hall	2–1	Limerick	Turners Cross
2014–15	Limerick	1–0	Avondale United	Askeaton
2015–16	Cobh Ramblers	2–1	Rockmount	Turners Cross
2016–17	Cork City	4-2	Wilton United	Turners Cross
2017–18	Cork City	5-0	St Mary’s	Turners Cross
2018–19	Cork City	3-1	Midleton	Turners Cross
2019–20	Rockmount	2-0	Cork City	Turners Cross
2020–21	-	-	-	-
2021–22	Cobh Ramblers	1-0	Cork City	Turners Cross
2022–23	Cobh Ramblers	3-1	Cork City	Turners Cross
2023–24	Waterford	2-1	Kerry	Turners Cross
2024–25	Cobh Ramblers	2-0	Rockmount	Turners Cross
2025–26	Cork City	2-1	Rockmount	Turners Cross

== List of winners by club ==
Club	Titles	Seasons
Cork City ^{(Note 3)}	20	1987–88, 1989–90, 1990–91, 1991–92, 1992–93, 1993–94, 1996–97, 1997–98, 1998–99, 1999–2000, 2000–01, 2001–02, 2002–03, 2003–04, 2004–05, 2007–08, 2016–17, 2017–18, 2018–19, 2025-2026
Waterford	16	1934–35, 1945–46, 1947–48, 1955–56, 1956–57, 1965–66, 1966–67, 1975–76, 1980–81, 1985–86, 1986–87, 2006–07, 2008–09, 2009–10, 2012–13, 2023–24
Limerick	13	1937–38, 1948–49, 1953–54, 1958–59, 1962–63, 1976–77,1983–84, 1984–85, 1988–89, 1994–95, 2005–06, 2011–12, 2014–15
Cobh Ramblers	8	1924–25, 1943–44, 1978–79, 1982–83, 2015–16, 2021–22, 2022–23, 2024–25
Cork Hibernians	8	1960–61, 1964–65, 1967–68, 1968–69, 1969–70, 1970–71, 1972–73, 1974–75
Fordsons/Cork	7	1922–23, 1923–24, 1925–26, 1928–29, 1929–30, 1933–34, 1936–37
Cork Bohemians	6	1926–27, 1927–28, 1930–31, 1931–32, 1932–33, 1942–43
Evergreen United/Cork Celtic	6	1951–52, 1959–60, 1961–62, 1963–64, 1971–72, 1973–74
Albert Rovers ^{(Note 4)}	4	1949–50, 1977–78, 1979–80, 1981–82
Cork United	3	1940–41, 1944–45, 1946–47
Cork Athletic	3	1950–51, 1952–53, 1954–55
Rifle Brigade	2	1910–11, 1913–14
Royal Welsh Fusiliers	2	1908–09, 1909–10
3rd Dragoon Guards	1	1905–06
6th Prov. Battalion	1	1901–02
Carrick United	1	2010–11
Cork Celtic ^{(Note 1)}	1	1903–04
Cork City ^{(Note 3)}	1	1938–39
Douglas Hall	1	2013–14
King's Own Yorkshire Light Infantry	1	1912–13
Manchester Regiment	1	1904–05
North Staffordshire Regiment	1	1911–12
Rockmount	1	2019-20
Royal Engineers	1	1902–03
Royal Field Artillery	1	1907–08
St. Kevin's	1	1941–42
Southern Rovers	1	1935–36
Waterford Crystal	1	1995–96

Notes

- ^1 This was not the same Cork Celtic that later played in the League of Ireland.
- ^2 Although the competition was played for in 1906–07, 1939–40, and 1957–58, no finals were played.
- ^3 Apart from the 1984 club named Cork City, two earlier clubs named Cork City have also been finalists.
- ^4 Albert Rovers also won the cup playing as Cork Alberts and Cork United. An earlier club also named Cork United were finalists and winners during the 1940s.
