= Avondale United F.C. (Cork) =

- Full name: Avondale United Football Club
- Founded: 1972
- Ground: Avondale Park, Carrigaline; Beaumont Park, Ballintemple; Bessboro Cross, Blackrock
- Coordinates: 51°49′21″N 8°22′46″W (Carrigaline)
- League: Munster Senior League; Cork Athletic Union League; Cork Schoolboys League; Cork City & County Youths League
- Website: www.avondaleunited.com
Home colours	Away colours

Avondale United F.C. is an Irish association football club based in Cork, Ireland. Originally formed in the Ballintemple area of Cork city, the club's main grounds are at Avondale Park in Carrigaline. The club's senior team play in the Munster Senior League Senior Premier Division. They also regularly compete in the FAI Cup, the FAI Intermediate Cup and the Munster Senior Cup. Avondale has won the FAI Intermediate Cup a record eight times and have been Munster Senior League champions on eight occasions. After winning the 2012–13 Munster title, they were also invited to play in the 2014 League of Ireland Cup. The club also fields reserve, intermediate, junior, youth and schoolboy teams in the Munster Senior League, the Cork Schoolboys League and the Cork City & County Youths League.

== History ==
Avondale United was formed in Ballintemple in 1972 with one junior team. They originally played in the Cork Athletic Union League and remained members of this league until 1989. Youth and schoolboys sides were added in 1973–74 and 1974–75 respectively and in 1977–78 Avondale joined the Munster Senior League. The club originally played on privately rented pitches or public spaces until they secured a long term lease on Beaumont Park. This ground is now the headquarters of the club's schoolboys section.

In 1986, Avondale purchased land in Carrigaline and developed the grounds into Avondale Park. After finishing runners up to Limerick City reserves in the 1985–86 Munster Senior League, Avondale won their first Senior Premier Division title in 1987–88.

In addition to winning an assortment of intermediate, junior, youth and schoolboy honours, Avondale has also enjoyed success at senior level, both nationally and provincially. They were quarter-finalists in the 1994–95 and 2014 FAI Cups. They have also been Munster Senior Cup finalists on three occasions.

Avondale were in the First Division of the Munster Senior League when John Caulfield was appointed player/manager in 2002. He subsequently led them to the First Division title and, over the next five years, Senior Premier Division and FAI Intermediate Cup trophies.

Avondale United became the first club from Cork to win back-to-back FAI Intermediate Cups in 2007, beating Bangor Celtic 1–0 in the 2006–07 final. The 2013–14 final saw Avondale win the cup for the fourth successive time, equalling a seventy two-year-old record held by Distillery. The victory also meant that between 2006 and 2014, Avondale reached the final on seven occasions, winning six of them.

In October 2024, the club voted to sell its grounds in Carrigaline, Avondale Park, for proposed residential development.

== Home grounds ==
Originally based in Ballintemple, in 1986 the club moved to Avondale Park in Carrigaline. The adult and youth teams are based at Avondale Park.

Prior to the 1986 move to Carrigaline, the Blackrock Community Association made a pitch in Beaumont Park in Ballintemple available to the club. The club now holds a ninety nine-year lease on this venue. This ground is used as the club's schoolboy headquarters. In later years, the club also used another private ground at Bessboro Cross, Blackrock.

== Notable former players ==
Republic of Ireland international

- (Republic of Ireland) Damien Delaney

Republic of Ireland U21 international

- (Republic of Ireland) Eoghan O'Connell

Others

- (Republic of Ireland) Tom Cashman – Cork GAA hurler and manager
- (Republic of Ireland) Simon Zebo – Ireland rugby union international
- (Republic of Ireland) Alan Kelly (referee)

== Notable former managers ==
- (Republic of Ireland) John Caulfield

== Honours ==
- FAI Intermediate Cup
  - Winners: 1977–78, 2005–06, 2006–07, 2010–11, 2011–12, 2012–13, 2013–14, 2018–19: 8
  - Runners-up: 2009–10: 1
- Munster Senior League Senior Premier Division
  - Winners: 1987–88, 1992–93, 1995–96, 2003–04, 2008–09, 2009–10, 2011–12, 2012–13, 2013-14: 9
  - Runners-up: 1985–86, 1988–89, 1991–92, 1993–94, 1994–95, 2005–06, 2007–08: 7
- Munster Senior League Senior First Division
  - Winners: 2002–03: 1
- Munster Senior Cup
  - Runners-up: 2004–05, 2012–13, 2014–15: 3
