= Tramore Athletic F.C. =

- Full name: Tramore Athletic Football Club
- Founded: 1948
- Ground: Tramore Park
- Coordinates: 51.8762°N 8.446°W
- League: Munster Senior League; Cork Athletic Union League
Home colours	Away colours

Tramore Athletic F.C. is an Irish association football club based in Douglas, Cork. As of 2025, the club's senior men's team was playing in the Junior 2nd Division of the Munster Senior League structure. The club has previously played in the Cork Athletic Union League. They have also entered teams in the FAI Cup, the FAI Intermediate Cup, the FAI Youth Cup and the Munster Senior Cup

== History ==
Tramore Athletic F.C. was formed in 1948 following a split within Evergreen United. This resulted in the club's youth players breaking away from Evergreen to form Tramore Athletic. The club was founded during a meeting at O'Connell's Corner House Pub in Turners Cross. The founding members came from Turners Cross, Douglas and Blackrock so decided to name the club after the Tramore River which passes through the three communities.

Having started out as a schoolboy club, Tramore Athletic became founding members of the Cork Schoolboys League shortly after the club's formation. They won their first ever trophy in 1954 after winning an under–14 league title. Tramore Athletic also joined the Cork Athletic Union League and in 1956–57 and 1957–58 won the league's third level and second level division titles in successive seasons. 1957–58 also saw the club come to national prominence for the first time when they won the FAI Youth Cup after defeating Johnville 2–0 in the final at Turners Cross. Encouraged by this national success, Tramore Athletic entered a team in the Munster Senior League for the first time in 1959.

Over subsequent decades Tramore Athletic has several successes at both provincial and national levels, winning four Munster Senior League Senior Premier Division titles and contesting seven FAI Intermediate Cup finals. They also won the FAI Youth Cup on two further occasions. Dave Barry and Kieran O'Regan both featured in the side which beat Home Farm in 1979–80. O'Regan also scored in the 3–0 win over Athlone Town in 1981–82. In addition to competing in the FAI Youth Cup and FAI Intermediate Cup, Tramore Athletic have also occasionally competed in the FAI Cup.

Tramore Athletic made it to the final of the 1987–88 FAI Intermediate Cup against Fanad United in Dalymount Park. The club also made it to the last sixteen of the FAI Cup the same season, beating Avondale United.

== Notable former players ==
Republic of Ireland internationals

- (Republic of Ireland) Chiedozie Ogbene
- (Republic of Ireland) Kieran O'Regan

Republic of Ireland U23 international

- (Republic of Ireland) Graham Cummins

League of Ireland XI representatives

- (Republic of Ireland) Dave Barry
- (Republic of Ireland) Donal Leahy

League of Ireland manager

- (Republic of Ireland) Noel O'Mahony

Cork inter-county Gaelic footballers

- (County Cork) Dave Barry
- (County Cork) Jimmy Kerrigan
- (County Cork) Paul Kerrigan
- (County Cork) Derek Kavanagh

== Honours ==
- Munster Senior League
  - Winners: 1966–67, 1973–74, 1988–89, 1989–90: 4
  - Runners-up: 1967–68, 1974–75, 1979–80, 1983–84, 1984–85, 1987–88: 6
- FAI Intermediate Cup
  - Winners: 1978–79, 1980–81, 1986–87: 3
  - Runners-up: 1966–67, 1979–80, 1981–82, 1987–88: 4
- FAI Youth Cup
  - Winners: 1957–58, 1979–80, 1981–82: 3
  - Runners-up: 1961–62, 1976–77: 2
- Munster Senior Cup
  - Runners-up: 1980–81, 1989–90: 2
