= Munster Football Association =

Association football provincial organisation, Ireland

- Formation: originally 1901 reformed 1922
- Type: Not-for-profit
- Legal status: CLG
- Headquarters: Turners Cross
- Location(s): Cork; Ireland
- Region served: Munster
- Affiliations: Football Association of Ireland (1922–present); Irish Football Association (1901–1914)
- Website: munsterfootball.ie

The Munster Football Association (Irish: An Cumann Peile na Mumhan; also known as the Munster FA and the MFA), is the governing body for association football in the Irish province of Munster. It is affiliated to the Football Association of Ireland and is responsible for organising the Munster Senior Cup and the Munster Senior League as well as numerous other leagues and cup competitions for junior teams. There are 13 leagues and approximately 800 teams affiliated with the MFA.

== History ==
The Munster Football Association (MFA) was founded in October 1901 and affiliated to the Belfast-based Irish Football Association. Other sources refer to a founding date of 24 August 1901. In the 1901–02 season the Munster Senior Cup was introduced. According to David Toms there were many civilian and British Army teams based throughout the province, most notably in Cork and Waterford, but also in Limerick and County Tipperary. However the original MFA organising committee was dominated by the British Army, and it fell into abeyance following the outbreak of the First World War. In March 1922 the MFA was re-established with the help of the Dublin–based Football Association of Ireland. One of the prime movers in reforming the association was a former Ireland international and then Fordsons player, Harry Buckle, who became its vice president and chairman.

In 1929, the Munster FA acquired Turners Cross after GAA club Nemo Rangers were forced to close the ground due to costs. In order to provide a long-term home for the MFA and Cork soccer, the FAI negotiated a 98-year lease on Turners Cross with the land's owner Helena O'Sullivan.

In February 2025, the Munster FA redesigned their crest.

== Representative games ==
Munster began playing representative games in as early as 1905. In that year they played an Ulster XI in Cork, losing 3-1. A combined Leinster & Munster team finished as runners up in the 2011 UEFA Regions' Cup. They lost 2–1 to a team representing the Braga Football Association.

== Cup competitions ==
- Munster Senior Cup
  - Since 1901–02
  - Open to League of Ireland and Intermediate clubs
- Munster Junior Cup
  - Since (at least) 1922–23
  - Open to Junior clubs from the top two divisions/tiers of each league
- Munster Youth Cup
  - Since 1925–26
  - Open to all under-18 and under-17 teams
- Munster Junior Shield
  - Since (at least) 2024–25
  - Open to Junior clubs from the third division/tier and below of each league
- Munster League Champions Trophy
  - Since 2011–12
  - Open to Junior league winners of the top division from each Munster FA affiliated league

== Affiliated leagues ==
Men's

- Munster Senior League
  - Senior Premier Division
- Clare District Soccer League
- Cork Athletic Union League
- Cork Business League
- Kerry District League
- Limerick Desmond Football League
- Limerick District League
- Waterford & District Junior League
- West Cork League
- West Waterford, East Cork (WWEC) League
- Tipperary Southern and District League
- North Tipperary and District League

Women's

- Cork Womens & Schoolgirls Soccer League (CWSSL)
- Limerick Desmond Ladies
- Limerick Womens Schoolgirls Soccer League (LWSSL)
- Tipperary Senior Ladies
- Waterford District Womens League

Youth

- Cork Youth League (16–19 years old)
- North Tipperary Schoolboys League/North Tipperary Schoolchildren’s Football League (5–15 years old)

== See also ==
- Irish Universities Football Union
- Connacht Football Association
- Leinster Football Association
- Women's Football Association of Ireland
- Galway Football Association
