= Midleton F.C. =

Irish football club

Coordinates: 51.916352°N 8.187170°W

- Full name: Midleton Football Club
- Nickname: The Magpies
- Founded: 1973
- Ground: Knockgriffin Park
- Chairman: Shane Mackessy
- Manager: Graham Cummins
- League: Munster Senior League Senior Premier Division
- 2024–25: 1st
- Website: www.midletonfc.com
Home colours	Away colours

Midleton Football Club is an Irish association football (soccer) club based in Midleton, County Cork. Their senior men's team currently plays in the Senior Premier Division of the Munster Senior League.

== History ==
The club was founded on 10 June 1973 at Fr Murphy's Youth Club. A chairman and secretary were elected at the meeting. The club started playing at Rosary Place and initially wore yellow and blue. Midleton F.C. joined the Cork Athletic Union League in September of that year. They finished second in 1978–79.

Midleton were named as FAI/Aviva Club of the Year in 2011–12 and were promoted to the Premier Division of the Munster Senior League and won it the following year. They have qualified for the FAI Cup on several occasions which includes reaching the Third Round of the 2011 FAI Cup.

In May 2025, Midleton secured the 2024/25 Munster Senior League Premier Division title, and their fifth overall, at home to St. Mary's.

== Ground ==
The club grounds are Knockgriffin Park, located in the northwest of Midleton. The club first played at the ground in 1979. The land was bought with money raised from selling Billy Woods to Coventry City in 1991.

== Honours ==
Munster Senior League

- Senior Premier Division
  - Winners (5): 1990–91, 1991–92, 2017–18, 2023–24, 2024–25
- Beamish Senior Cup
  - Winners (1): 2015–16
- FAI/Aviva Club of the Year
  - Winners (1): 2011–12
- Pop Keller Cup
  - Winners (2): 2007–08, 2009–10

== Notable players ==
- Billy Woods
- Ben Dumigan
