= College Corinthians A.F.C. =

Irish football club

- Full name: College Corinthians; Association Football Club
- Founded: 1971
- Ground: Corinthians Park, Castletreasure, Donnybrook, Douglas, Cork
- Coordinates: 51°51′33″N 8°26′26″W
- League: Munster Senior League; Cork Schoolboys League; Cork Women's and Schoolgirls Soccer League
- Website: www.collegecorinthians.com
Home colours	Away colours

College Corinthians A.F.C. is an Irish association football club based in Douglas, Cork. Their senior men's team play in the Munster Senior League Senior Premier Division. They also regularly compete in the FAI Cup, the FAI Intermediate Cup and the Munster Senior Cup. Corinthians also fields a reserve team and an over 35 team in the lower divisions of the Munster Senior League. In addition the club operates a large youth and schoolboy section and enters teams in the Cork Schoolboys League and schoolgirl teams in the Cork Women's and Schoolgirls Soccer League.

== History ==
College Corinthians was founded in 1971 by five former University College Cork A.F.C. players who were no longer eligible to play for the club after graduating from the university. Corinthians still maintains links with UCC. It is not uncommon for players to play schoolboy football with Corinthians, then play youth football with UCC before returning to Corinthians to play senior football. Shortly after their founding, the club joined the Munster Senior League. In 1994, the club started its schoolboy section. Corinthians had one of their most successful seasons in 1994–1995 when the senior men's team won their first Munster Senior League Senior Premier Division title and also reached the FAI Intermediate Cup final. In addition, their senior women's team reached the FAI Women's Cup final for the second time. In 1997–1998, the senior men's team repeated the feat, winning their third Munster league title and reaching the FAI Intermediate Cup final for a second time.

== Home grounds ==
Corinthians established Corinthians Park in Castletreasure, Donnybrook, in 1990. Before then they played their home games at The Farm, UCC AFC's grounds in Bishopstown.

== Notable former players ==
Republic of Ireland men's international
- (Republic of Ireland) David Meyler
- (Republic of Ireland) Adam Idah
- (Republic of Ireland) Chiedozie Ogbene
Republic of Ireland U21 men's internationals
- (Republic of Ireland) Brian Lenihan
- (Republic of Ireland) Eoghan O'Connell
- (Republic of Ireland) Adam Idah
Republic of Ireland U23 men's international
- (Republic of Ireland) Graham Cummins
Republic of Ireland women's international
- (Republic of Ireland) Megan Connolly
Others
- (Republic of Ireland) Ger Canning – RTÉ sports commentator

== Honours ==
Senior Men's Team

- FAI Intermediate Cup (1) 2024–25
- Munster Senior League Senior Premier Division (5): 1994–95, 1996–97, 1997–98, 2000–01, 2002–03
- Munster Senior League Senior First Division (1): 2010–11
- Munster Senior Cup (0): (runners-up in 2000–01)

Senior Women's Team

- FAI Women's Cup (0): (runners-up in 1992–93, 1994–95)
- Women's Munster Senior Cup (1): 2014–15

Schoolboys

- SFAI Under 15 Evans National Cup (1): 2017–18
