= Carrigaline United A.F.C. =

Irish football club

Coordinates: 51°49′00″N 8°24′16″W

- Full name: Carrigaline United Association Football Club
- Founded: 1972
- Ground: Ballea Park
- Chairman: Willie Walsh (as of 2022)
- League: Munster Senior League Senior First Division
- Website: cuafc.ie
Home colours	Away colours

Carrigaline United Association Football Club is an Irish association football (soccer) club based in Carrigaline, County Cork. As of the 2025–2026 season, the club's men's team was playing in the Senior Premier Division of the Munster Senior League.

Carrigaline United have qualified for the FAI Cup on several occasions, including in 2006, 2008 and 2009. The club's colours are yellow and blue.

== History ==
Carrigaline United A.F.C. was founded in 1972. They originally played at the Pottery Field, which later became the site of the Carrigaline Court Hotel. The club moved to Ballea Park, which opened on 29 June 1985. A new clubhouse, with a bar and changing rooms, was opened in March 2004 and an all-weather pitch was added in June 2012.

In 2011, a "Football for All" program was established, allowing access to team sport for young people aged 6–18 with disabilities and neurodivergence.

Carrigaline United made their first FAI Cup appearance in 2006, reaching the last 32 of the competition. They have qualified for the FAI Cup on several occasions since, including in 2008 and 2009.

The club competed in the FAI Intermediate Cup in 2022, making it to the quarter-finals. Carrigaline men's team finished second in the 2024–2025 Senior First Division of the Munster Senior League and were promoted to the Senior Premier Division.

== Ground ==
The club grounds are Ballea Park, located in the west of Carrigaline.

== Notable players ==
- Stephen Carroll
- Aaron Drinan
- Shane Griffin
- Josh Honohan
- Mark O'Mahony
