= Mallow United F.C. =

Mallow United
- Full name: Mallow United Football Club
- Founded: 11 November 1926 (99 years ago)
- Ground: Town Park, Mallow, County Cork
- League: Munster Senior League
- 2024–25: Senior Second Division, 2nd of 12
Home colours	Away colours

Mallow United Football Club (Irish: Cumann Peile Magh Eala Aontaithe) is an Irish football club based in Mallow, County Cork. Their senior men's team competes in the Munster Senior League.

The club also fields youth teams in the Cork Schoolboys League, Cork Youth League and Cork Women's & Schoolgirls Soccer League (CWSSL). Mallow qualified for the FAI Cup in 1990.

== History ==
=== 1926–1935 ===
==== Founding of the club ====
Mallow United Football Club was formed at a meeting held in the Central Hotel, Mallow on 11 November 1926. Originally named Mallow Association Football Club, the attendees chose the club colours of red and black and set the annual membership fee at two shillings and sixpence (2/6) with a weekly charge of threepence (3d). The club also decided to affiliate and enter teams into the Munster Junior Cup.

F.G. Ward of Bridge Street was elected as the club's first chairman and W.J. Robinson of Spa Square was appointed secretary and treasurer. Also present at this meeting were: F.J. Farley, J. O'Keeffe, L. Ward, (all of Bridge Street); G. Grogan, C. Davis, D. Sheehan (all of Main Street); G.A. Robinson, J. Hartnett, (both of Spa Walk); D. Burns, F. Mahony (both of Ballydaheen); F. Clune of Fair Street; L. Kennan of Humes Lane and G. Byrne of Bank Place. The group decided to delay the appointment of a selection committee and team captain until the club had formed a team.

==== First recorded fixtures ====
The second meeting was held at 119 Main Street on 24 November 1926. At the meeting, arrangements were made for the club's first match; to be played against Sunnyside Rovers. The players selected for the inaugural fixture were: G. Robinson, J. Hartnett, W. Robinson, F. Mahony, C. Davis, D. Burns. G. Kennedy, P. McDermott, W. Conway, F.G. Ward and T. Crowley with F.G. Ward chosen as team captain.

Mallow United were drawn against Glenview in the FAI Junior Cup and played the match on 20 January 1927. The Mallow team consisted of G.A. Robinson, F. Mahony, W.J. Robinson. W. Conway, F.G. Ward (captain) C. Davis (vice-captain), D. Burns, G.Kennedy, J.C. Kelly, P. McDermott and J. Hartnett.

Mallow's 1st round Munster Junior Cup match on 20 February 1927 was against Sunnyside Rovers with Mallow losing the game with a score of 5 goals to 2. The team line up for the game was G.A. Robinson. G. Kennedy, W.J. Robinson. F.O'Mahony, C. Davis, J. Matthews, F.G.Ward (Captain) D. Burns, J.J. McDermott, W. Conway and R. Lenihan. The three substitutes listed for the match were J.J. Hartnett, E. Hanley and A. Callaghan.

By this time, the committee had appointed Major Godfrey, Dr. E. F. O' Connor and Mr. G. Kennedy as team coaches. The committee was also active in trying to secure the Fair Field as a playing pitch from Mr. W. Priestley.

==== Earliest league campaigns ====
The earliest recorded team to take part in the Munster Junior League was the team that played Central United on Sunday 30 September 1928. The Munster Junior League was made up of the following teams: Cork Bohemians, Fordsons, Bridewell, Barracton, Cork City, Cork Celtic, G.S.R. Fermoy, Cobh Ramblers, Southern Rovers, Gratton Rangers, Springfield, Burtonville, Tramways, Dwyers, Bellville, Ardfallen, Central United, Glenview, Rockmount, and Victoria Celtic.

After only one year in football the Mallow United decided to step up from Junior football and enter the Munster Senior League. This indeed was a major step for a club that was founded only the year before, but reflected the ambition of the club. The League had the following members: Barrackton United, Bohemians, Cahir Park, Cobh Ramblers, Cork Celtic, Cork City, Fermoy, Waterford Celtic, and Mallow.

Mallow found the going tough from the start of the season and failed to make an impression and after one season dropped back down to Junior football where they were later to join the North Munster League. Surprisingly it would be another sixty years before the North Cork town would play senior football again when Mallow United would once again join the Munster Senior League. The league was won by Waterford Celtic with Cork Celtic as runners-up.

==== Windsor Park ====
Further evidence of the ambition of the club committee is illustrated by the decision to embark on a trip north to Belfast to play Craigavad F.C. Arrangements for the trip were made by Mr. William Girvan who worked for a manufacturing stationery company Wm Ritchie & Sons Ltd of Elder St., Edinburgh. In the course of his business trips south he would call to Robinsons Bros, Grocers, Main Street, Mallow. W.J. Robinson was Hon. Secretary of Mallow United while his brother G.A. Robinson was Hon. Treasurer.

Mallow traveled north and played this historic match at Windsor Park. Coming so close to the political strife of the time, the fixture was an example of sport winning over political divisions. A return match was arranged for Easter Monday 1928 in the Town Park in Mallow. Craigavad F.C. traveled to Mallow on Easter Sunday and stayed in the Central Hotel. For the Mallow United v Craigavad match in March 1928 the team was: Sonny O'Neill, Bill Robinson, Fred Ward, Jimmy Wrixon, Chris Davis, Paddy Waters, Jack Golden, Sonny O'Riordan, George Byrne, Matt Culloty, Joe Weir.

=== Departure and return ===
Mallow United departed Intermediate football at the end of the 2024–25 season but returned for the 2026–27 season.

== Honours ==
- Munster Senior League
  - Junior First Division Champions 07/08
  - Junior Super Cup Winners 08/09
