= Munster Senior League (association football) =

- Country: (Republic of Ireland) Ireland
- Region: Munster
- Divisions: Senior Premier Division; Senior First Division; Senior Second Division
- Number of clubs: 62 (2015–16)
- Domestic cup(s): Munster Senior Cup; FAI Cup; FAI Intermediate Cup; FAI Junior Cup
- League cup(s): Keane Cup; Donie Forde Cup; Beamish Cup
- Current champions: Midleton F.C.
- Most championships: Cobh Ramblers (15 titles)
- Website: Munster Senior League

The Munster Senior League (MSL) is an association football league organised by the Munster Football Association. The league consists of three senior divisions and is responsible for a further six divisions as well as various cup competitions. Its Senior Division lies at the third level of the Republic of Ireland football league system. Munster Senior League teams also compete in the Munster Senior Cup, the FAI Cup, the FAI Intermediate Cup and the FAI Junior Cup. In recent seasons the winners of the Senior Division have qualified to play in the League of Ireland Cup.

Despite including the word 'Munster' and referencing senior football in its title, as of 2024, the league is considered to be at intermediate level with all participating clubs based solely in County Cork. However, in the past it has included clubs from County Limerick, County Waterford, County Kerry and County Tipperary.

== History ==
=== Early years ===
The original Munster Football Association was founded in 1901 and it is believed that a Munster League was founded within a few years. The 1909–10 season saw six teams representing the Highland Light Infantry, the Royal Welch Fusiliers, the Durham Light Infantry, the Sherwood Foresters, the King's Regiment and Haulbowline all played in the Munster League First Division. A Munster Intermediate League featured the reserve teams of all these British Army regiments plus teams representing the Royal Engineers, the Royal Field Artillery and the Royal Army Service Corps. In the Munster Cup the Highland Light Infantry lost 1–0 to the Royal Welsh Fusiliers in the final played at Turner's Cross. Cahir Park F.C. was founded in 1910 in County Tipperary and by 1912–13 were the Munster Senior League second division champions. However these leagues were effectively disbanded during the First World War and Irish War of Independence era.

=== Reformed ===
In 1921 Harry Buckle, a former Ireland international, settled in Cork and began working for the Ford Motor Company. Finding little or no association football activity in the city, Buckle initially founded Fordsons F.C. and then helped found the County Cork–based South Munster League for the team to play in. In addition to playing and coaching with the new club, Buckle also served as president of the Tipperary/Limerick based – North Munster League and helped reform the Munster Football Association. By 1922–23 the South Munster League and North Munster Leagues had effectively merged to become the Munster Senior League. Barrackton United of the South Munster League became the first post–First World War Munster Senior League champions after defeating Cahir Park F.C. of the North Munster League in a play-off.

== League pyramid ==
The Munster Senior League has three league sections: the Senior League (3 intermediate divisions), the Junior League (5 junior divisions) and the Floodlit League (over 35s division).

The Junior League consists of reserve teams that belong to the Senior League clubs. However, as of 2024, three clubs had their main team competing in the Junior League; Ballincollig AFC, Brideview United and Crosshaven AFC. The most recent member is Brideview United of Tallow, having joined in August 2024 after the demise of the West Waterford East Cork junior league. Brideview are also the only non-Cork club in the Munster Junior League. At the end of the 2024–25 season, Crosshaven joined the Senior League with Wilton United and Mallow United leaving the senior ranks.

As of November 2024, there is no promotion or relegation system in place between the League of Ireland First Division (Level 2 of the national league system) and the intermediate provincial leagues (Level 3 of the system), which includes Munster. Additionally, while any junior club in Munster can apply to join the intermediate ranks if they feel they are capable, there is no formal promotion or relegation between the junior leagues and the Munster intermediate ranks.

The divisions of the league are decided by the Management Committee each season, based on the number of clubs available and on any vacancies that may have arisen in the off-season. As such, the number of teams in each division may vary. Below is the format for the 2024–25 season, which employs 3rd place playoffs for relegation & promotion.

Colour-coding key
Intermediate (levels 3–6)
Junior (level 7)

Pyramid Level	League(s) / division(s)
3	Munster Senior League; Senior Premier Division 10 clubs – 2 or 3 relegations
4	Munster Senior League; Senior First Division 10 clubs – 2 or 3 promotions, 2 or 3 relegations
5	Munster Senior League; Senior Second Division 12 clubs – 2 or 3 promotions
6	None
7	Multiple Junior Leagues including Junior Premier Division, Junior First, Second, Third & Fourth Divisions

== Teams ==
=== Intermediate Leagues ===
2024-25 Senior Premier Clubs

Team	Home town/suburb	Home ground
Avondale United	Carrigaline/Ballintemple, Cork	Avondale Park
Cobh Wanderers	Cobh, County Cork	Oldchurch Park
College Corinthians	Douglas, Cork	Corinthians Park
Douglas Hall	Douglas, Cork	Moneygourney
Leeds AFC	Ballyvolane, Cork	Leeds Park
Midleton	Midleton, County Cork	Knockgriffin Park
Ringmahon Rangers	Blackrock, Cork	Ringmahon Park
Rockmount	Whitechurch, County Cork	Rockmount Park
St. Mary's AFC	Whites Cross, Cork	St. Mary's Park
UCC	University College Cork	The Mardyke/The Farm

2024-25 Senior First Division Clubs

Team	Home town/suburb	Home ground
Bandon AFC	Bandon, County Cork	Town Park
Blarney United	Blarney	O'Shea Park
Carrigaline United	Carrigaline	Ballea Park
Castleview AFC	Cork	O'Sullivan Park
Everton AFC	Togher, Cork City	Everton Park
Lakewood Athletic	Ballincollig	Lakewood Sports and Social Club
Leeside United	Little Island, Cork	Little Island Sports Complex
Mayfield United	Mayfield	Lotamore Grounds
Riverstown	Glanmire	The Cliff
Wilton United	Wilton, Cork	Pat Bowdren Park

2024–25 Senior Second Division Clubs

Team	Home town/suburb	Home ground
Ballinhassig	Ballinhassig	Gortnaglough
Buttevant	Buttevant	Abbeyview
Carrigtwohill United	Carrigtwohill	Ballyadam
Fermoy FC	Fermoy	Carrig Park
Kanturk AFC	Kanturk	Gurteenard
Kinsale AFC	Kinsale	Madden Park
Macroom FC	Macroom	Murrayfield
Mallow United AFC	Mallow	Town Park
Park United	Mitchelstown	Brigown Park
Passage AFC	Passage West	Rockenham
Temple United	Cork	Temple Park
Youghal United	Youghal	Ardrath Park

=== Selected others ===
This is a selection of teams playing in the lower levels of the Munster Senior League.

Team	Home town/suburb	Home county	Home ground
Mallow United	Mallow	County Cork	Town Park
Tramore Athletic	Douglas	County Cork	Tramore Park
Wilton United	Wilton	County Cork	Pat Bowdren Park

== Cup competitions ==
=== Donie Forde Trophy ===
First held in 2005–06 and named after the former MFA secretary, the competition consists of a straight knockout between the top four from the MSL Senior Premier Division and the top four from the Senior First Division.

== Representative team ==
A Munster Senior League representative team competes in the FAI Intermediate Interprovincial Tournament against teams representing the Ulster Senior League, the Leinster Senior League and Connacht.

== 2024-25 season ==
=== Senior Premier Division ===
End of Season Table

Pos	Team	Pld	W	D	L	Pts	Qualification or Relegation
1	Midleton (C)	18	13	4	1	43	Champions
2	Ringmahon Rangers	18	11	4	3	37	
3	Avondale United	18	9	5	4	32	
4	College Corinthians	18	6	6	6	24	
5	St. Mary's FC	18	5	5	8	20	
6	Rockmount AFC	18	5	5	8	20	
7	Cobh Wanderers	18	5	5	8	20	
8	UCC (O)	18	5	4	9	19	Playoff with First Division
9	Douglas Hall (R)	18	5	4	9	19	Relegation to First Division
10	Leeds AFC (R)	18	4	2	12	14	Relegation to First Division

(C) Champions; (O) Play-off winners; (R) Relegated

Table at Christmas

Pos	Team	Pld	W	D	L	Pts	Qualification or Relegation
1	Midleton	9	7	1	1	22	Champions
2	Avondale United	8	6	1	1	19	
3	Ringmahon Rangers	7	6	1	0	19	
4	Rockmount AFC	8	4	1	3	13	
5	College Corinthians	8	3	1	4	10	
6	Douglas Hall	8	3	0	5	9	
7	UCC	9	2	2	5	8	
8	Leeds AFC	9	2	1	6	7	
9	St. Mary's FC	8	1	3	4	6	Relegation to First Division
10	Cobh Wanderers	8	1	1	6	4	Relegation to First Division

=== Senior First Division ===
End of Season Table

Pos	Team	Pld	W	D	L	Pts	Qualification or Relegation
1	Mayfield United (C)	18	13	3	2	42	Promotion to Premier Division
2	Carrigaline United	18	10	6	2	36	Promotion to Premier Division
3	Castleview AFC	18	8	6	4	30	Playoff with Premier Division
4	Bandon AFC	18	8	4	6	28	
5	Riverstown	18	7	3	8	24	
6	Wilton United	18	5	7	6	22	
7	Blarney United	18	6	4	8	22	
8	Everton AFC (O)	18	4	5	9	17	Playoff with Second Division
9	Leeside AFC (R)	18	4	5	9	17	Relegation to Second Division
10	Lakewood Athletic (R)	18	1	5	12	8	Relegation to Second Division

(C) Champions; (O) Play-off winners; (R) Relegated

Table at Christmas

Pos	Team	Pld	W	D	L	Pts	Qualification or Relegation
1	Mayfield United	10	6	2	2	20	Champions/Promotion to Premier Division
2	Carrigaline United	10	5	4	1	19	Promotion to Premier Division
3	Bandon AFC	18	5	3	3	18	
4	Riverstown	11	5	1	5	16	
5	Blarney United	11	4	3	4	15	
6	Castleview	8	4	2	2	14	
7	Wilton United	10	2	5	3	11	
8	Leeside United	9	2	3	4	9	
9	Everton AFC	9	2	2	5	8	Relegation to Second Division
10	Lakewood Athletic	11	1	3	7	6	Relegation to Second Division

=== Senior Second Division ===
End of Season Table

Pos	Team	Pld	W	D	L	Pts	Qualification or Relegation
1	Passage AFC (C)	22	18	2	2	56	Promotion to First Division
2	Mallow United	22	18	1	3	55	Promotion to First Division
3	Ballinhassig AFC	22	14	3	5	45	Playoff with First Division
4	Fermoy FC	22	13	1	8	40	
5	Youghal United	22	11	5	6	38	
6	Carrigtwohill United	22	10	3	9	33	
7	Park United	22	9	2	11	29	
8	Kanturk AFC	22	7	3	12	24	
9	Kinsale AFC	22	5	4	13	19	
10	Temple United	22	3	7	12	16	
11	Macroom FC	22	3	6	13	15	
12	Buttevant	22	2	1	19	7	No Formal Relegation to Junior Leagues

(C) Champions; (O) Play-off winners

Table at Christmas

Pos	Team	Pld	W	D	L	Pts	Qualification or Relegation
1	Passage AFC	10	8	1	1	25	Champions/Promotion to First Division
2	Mallow United	10	7	1	2	22	Promotion to First Division
3	Fermoy FC	11	6	1	4	19	
4	Youghal United	11	5	4	2	19	
5	Ballinhassig	9	5	2	2	17	
6	Kanturk AFC	11	4	1	6	13	
7	Park United	10	4	1	5	13	
8	Temple United	9	3	3	3	12	
9	Kinsale AFC	11	3	2	6	11	
10	Carrigtwohill United	8	3	1	4	10	
11	Buttevant	10	1	1	8	4	
12	Macroom FC	10	0	4	6	4	
