= 2012–13 Leinster Senior Cup =

Leinster Football Association Senior Cup

Tournament details
- Country: Ireland
- Teams: 39

Final positions
- Champions: Shamrock Rovers
- Runner-up: St. Patrick's Athletic

Tournament statistics
- Matches played: 38

The 2012–13 Leinster Senior Cup, was the 112th staging of the Leinster Senior Cup association football competition.

39 teams entered the 2012–13 competition including the 11 Leinster based League of Ireland teams who entered the competition at the Fourth round stage. A further 15 Intermediate teams and 13 Junior teams entered the competition at the First and Second Round stage.

Shamrock Rovers are the defending champions.

== Participating teams ==
The teams taking part in the 2013 Leinster Senior Cup are:

Club	League	Rank
Arklow Town 'A'	Leinster Senior League Senior Division	Intermediate
Arklow Town 'B'	Wicklow & District League Premier Division	Junior
Athlone Town	League of Ireland First Division	Senior
Bangor Celtic	Leinster Senior League Senior Division	Intermediate
Belgrove/Home Farm	Leinster Senior League Senior 1	Intermediate
Bluebell United	Leinster Senior League Senior Division	Intermediate
Bohemians	League of Ireland Premier Division	Senior
Bray Wanderers	League of Ireland Premier Division	Senior
Clontarf Athletic	United Churches League Premier Division	Junior
Crumlin United	Leinster Senior League Senior Division	Intermediate
Drogheda United	League of Ireland Premier Division	Senior
Duleek	Meath & District League Premier Division	Junior
Dundalk	League of Ireland Premier Division	Senior
Edenderry Town	Leinster Senior League Senior Division	Intermediate
Evergreen	Kilkenny & District League Premier Division	Junior
Firhouse Clover	Leinster Senior League Senior Division	Intermediate
Galty Celtic	Leinster Football League Division 3	Junior
Glebe North Athletic	Leinster Senior League Senior Division	Intermediate
Liffey Celtic	Kildare & District League Senior Division	Junior
Longford Town	League of Ireland First Division	Senior
Malahide United	Leinster Senior League Senior Division	Intermediate
New Oak Boys	Carlow & District League Premier Division	Junior
Newbridge Town	Leinster Senior League Senior 1	Intermediate
Our Lady of Victory	Amateur Football League Premier Division	Junior
Phoenix F.C. Navan Road	Leinster Senior League Senior Division	Intermediate
Ratoath Harps	Leinster Senior League Senior 1B	Intermediate
Shamrock Rovers	League of Ireland Premier Division	Senior
Shamrock Rovers (Wexford)	Wexford Football League Premier Division	Junior
Shelbourne	League of Ireland Premier Division	Senior
Sheriff Y.C.	Athletic Union League Premier A	Junior
St. Kevin's Boys	Athletic Union League Premier A	Junior
St. Patrick's Athletic	League of Ireland Premier Division	Senior
St. Patrick's C.Y.F.C.	Leinster Senior League Senior Division	Intermediate
Tolka Rovers	Leinster Senior League Senior Division	Intermediate
UCD	League of Ireland Premier Division	Senior
Wayside Celtic	Leinster Senior League Senior Division	Intermediate
Wexford Youths	League of Ireland First Division	Senior
Willow Park	Combined Counties Football League Senior Division	Junior
Woodview Celtic	Meath & District League Premier Division	Junior

== First round ==
10 Intermediate clubs and 6 Junior clubs were entered into this round by a draw. Byes were given to 12 other clubs. Winners progress to the Second Round.

8 November 2012	Malahide United	1 – 3	St. Kevin's Boys	Gannon Park

November 2012	New Oak Boys	1 – 4	Woodview Celtic	Burrin Road, Carlow

November 2012	Belgrove/Home Farm	1 – 5	Tolka Rovers	St. Paul's College

11 November 2012	Bluebell United	0 – 1	Evergreen	Caplo Park

November 2012	Our Lady of Victory	0 – 8	Wayside Celtic	Markievicz Park, Ballyfermot

November 2012	Firhouse Clover	3 – 1	Arklow Town 'A'	Tallaght I.T.

November 2012	Newbridge Town	0 – 1	Glebe North Athletic	Station Road

November 2012	Shamrock Rovers (Wexford)	1 – 3	Crumlin United	Father Murphy Park, Enniscorthy

Byes:

- Edenderry Town
- Bangor Celtic
- St. Patrick's C.Y.F.C.
- Ratoath Harps
- Phoenix F.C. Navan Road
- Sheriff Y.C.
- Duleek
- Galty Celtic
- Clontarf Athletic
- Willow Park
- Liffey Celtic
- Arklow Town B

== Second round ==
10 Intermediate clubs and 10 Junior clubs were placed in the draw for the Second Round. The winners of these 10 matches will proceed to the Third Round.

6 December 2012	Sheriff Y.C.	2 – 1	Phoenix F.C. Navan Road	Clontarf Road Complex
18:45

7 December 2012	Glebe North Athletic	0 – 3	Willow Park	Market Green, Balbriggan
19:45

9 December 2012	Bangor Celtic	3 – 1	Edenderry Town	Iveagh Grounds
11:00

9 December 2012	Tolka Rovers	2 – 1	Evergreen	Frank Cooke Park
14:00

14 December 2013	Arklow Town 'B'	v	Liffey Celtic	Lamberton
19:45

15 December 2012	Clontarf Athletic	3 – 1	Galty Celtic	Baskin Lane
14:00

16 December 2012	Wayside Celtic	v	Crumlin United	Jackson Park
14:00

3 January 2013	Ratoath Harps	3 – 1	Duleek	Skryne Road, Ratoath

6 January 2013	Firhouse Clover	3 – 2	Woodview Celtic	Tallaght I.T.

20 January 2013	St. Kevin's Boys	3 – 0 (a.e.t.)	St. Patrick's C.Y.F.C.	Shanowen Road, Whitehall

== Third round ==
5 Intermediate clubs and 5 Junior clubs made it to the draw for the Third Round. The 5 winners will go on to the Fourth Round.

1 February 2013	Bangor Celtic	3 – 2 (a.e.t.)	Clontarf Athletic	Iveagh Grounds

1 February 2013	Sheriff Y.C.	11 – 1	Liffey Celtic	Clontarf Road Complex

8 February 2013	Tolka Rovers	3 – 1	Firhouse Clover	Frank Cooke Park

14 February 2013	Ratoath Harps	1 – 3	Wayside Celtic	Skryne Road, Ratoath

24 February 2013	Willow Park	1 – 2	St. Kevin's Boys	Kilmacuagh Avenue, Athlone

== Fourth round ==
The 3 Intermediate teams and the 2 Junior teams that won their Third Round matches were placed in the draw for the Fourth Round along with the 11 Leinster based Senior League of Ireland teams. The draw took place on 28 January 2013.

20 February 2013	Sheriff Y.C.	0 – 2 (a.e.t.)	Dundalk	Clontarf Road Complex
20:00	Anthony Murphy (red card) 45+1' ??? (red card)	Report	Patrick Hoban 92' 119'

24 February 2013	Bohemians	1 – 2 (a.e.t.)	UCD	Dalymount Park
13:00	David Scully 88'	Report	Gary Burke 87'; Ciaran Nangle og' (120+1)	Referee: Paul Tuite

25 February 2013	St. Patrick's Athletic	3 – 1	Bangor Celtic	Richmond Park
19:45	Kenny Browne 20' 44'; Seán Gannon 84'	Report	Michael Fox 3'	Attendance: 416; Referee: Ray Harvey

27 February 2013	Shamrock Rovers	1 – 0	Wexford Youths	Tallaght Stadium
20:00	Ciarán Kilduff 6'; Karl Sheppard (penalty missed) 17'	Report		Referee: Neil Doyle

2 April 2013	Longford Town	2 – 1	St. Kevin's Boys	Flancare Park
19:45	??? 54' ??? 78'		Al Murphy 29'

9 April 2013	Drogheda United	1 – 2 (a.e.t.)	Wayside Celtic	Hunky Dorys Park
19:45 BST	Declan O'Brien 84'	Report	Thomas O'Hanlon 37'; Darren Lacey 102'	Attendance: 100; Referee: ???

30 April 2013	Shelbourne	3 – 1	Athlone Town	Tolka Park
19:45	Sean Brennan 18' 59'; Ian Ryan 50'	Report	Ryan Coombes 20'	Attendance: 184; Referee: Simon Rogers

14 May 2013	Bray Wanderers	4 – 1	Tolka Rovers	Carlisle Grounds
19:45	Daire Doyle 12'; Ismahil Akinade 16' 36' pen' (72)	Report	Sean Skelly 63'; Paul Tancred (red card) 71'; Peter Rogers (red card) 77'	Attendance: ??? Referee: Darragh Keegan

== Quarter-finals ==
The draw for the quarter-finals was made on 24 April 2013 in Abbotstown, Dublin.

4 June 2013	St. Patrick's Athletic	2 – 0 (a.e.t.)	Longford Town	Richmond Park
19:45	Anto Flood 96'; Conan Byrne 113'	Report		Attendance: ??? Referee: Rob Harvey

4 June 2013	Shelbourne	2 – 1	UCD	Tolka Park
20:00	Mark Leech 29'; Dean Kelly 80'	Report	Colm Crowe 33'	Attendance: 140; Referee: Adriano Reale

15 July 2013	Shamrock Rovers	4 – 1	Dundalk	Tallaght Stadium
20:00	Karl Sheppard 30'; Mark Quigley 45+1'; Eamon Zayed 59'; Thomas Stewart 67'	Report	Ciarán O'Connor 51'	Referee: Ben Connolly (Dublin)

18 August 2013	Wayside Celtic	1 – 0	Bray Wanderers	Jackson Park
14:30	Ross Zambra 90'

== Semi-finals ==
19 August 2013	Shelbourne	1 – 2	St. Patrick's Athletic	Tolka Park
20:00	Garreth O'Connor 42'		Christy Fagan 19'; Christy Fagan 64'	Attendance: ??? Referee: Rob Harvey

2 September 2013	Wayside Celtic	0 – 3	Shamrock Rovers	Jackson Park
19:45		Report	Gary McCabe 18'; Billy Dennehy 31'; Karl Sheppard 53'

== Final ==
20 October 2013	St. Patrick's Athletic	0 – 1	Shamrock Rovers	Richmond Park
19:45		Report	James Chambers 20'	Attendance: 600; Referee: Ben Connolly

== See also ==
- 2013 Leinster Senior Cup Final
