= List of St Patrick's Athletic F.C. seasons =

The following is a list of St Patrick's Athletic F.C. seasons.

== Seasons ==
Season	League of Ireland									FAI Cup^{[B]}	Shield/ League Cup^{[C]}	Setanta Sports Cup	President's Cup	Leinster Senior Cup	Europe^{[D]}		League Top goalscorer(s)^{[E]}	
Season	Division^{[A]}	P	W	D	L	F	A	Pts	Pos	FAI Cup^{[B]}	Shield/ League Cup^{[C]}	Setanta Sports Cup	President's Cup	Leinster Senior Cup	Europe^{[D]}		Name	Goals
2000–01	Premier	33	14	11	8	54	41	53	5th	R3	W							
2001–02	Premier	33	20	8	5	59	29	53 ^{1}	3rd	R2	QF							
2002–03	Premier	27	8	9	10	27	33	33	7th	QF	N/A				UEFA Intertoto Cup	R2		
2003	Premier	36	10	16	10	48	48	46	7th	RU	W						Aidan O'Keeffe	10
2004	Premier	36	11	9	16	38	49	42	8th	R3	Grp							
2005	Premier	33	7	11	15	26	36	32	10th	R3	QF						Robbie Doyle	7
2006	Premier	30	9	10	11	32	29	37	7th	RU	R2						Paul Keegan & Trevor Molloy	6
2007	Premier	33	18	7	8	54	29	61	2nd	QF	R2	SF			UEFA Cup	1st QR	Mark Quigley	15
2008	Premier	33	20	6	7	48	24	66	2nd	SF	R2	Grp			UEFA Cup	R1	Mark Quigley	15
2009	Premier	36	13	4	19	29	46	43	7th	QF	R2	Grp			UEFA Europa League	Play-Off	Ryan Guy	6
2010	Premier	36	16	9	11	55	33	57	5th	SF	QF	RU		R1			Vinny Faherty	8
2011	Premier	36	17	12	7	62	35	63	4th	SF	QF	R1		W	UEFA Europa League	3rd QR	Danny North	15
2012	Premier	30	15	10	5	44	22	55	3rd	RU	QF	R1		QF	UEFA Europa League	3rd QR	Christy Fagan	13
2013	Premier	33	21	8	4	56	20	71	1st	QF	QF	R1		RU	UEFA Europa League	1st QR	Anthony Flood	10
2014	Premier	33	19	8	6	66	37	65	3rd	W	R2	SF	W	W	UEFA Champions League	2nd QR	Christy Fagan	20
2015	Premier	33	18	4	11	52	34	58	4th	R3	W		RU	SF	UEFA Europa League	1st QR	Chris Forrester	11
2016	Premier	33	13	6	14	45	41	45	7th	SF	W			R4	UEFA Europa League	2nd QR	Conan Byrne	11
2017	Premier	33	9	12	12	45	52	39	8th	R2	QF			SF			Kurtis Byrne	10
2018	Premier	36	15	5	16	51	47	50	5th	R2	R2			RU			Jake Keegan	9
2019	Premier	36	14	10	12	29	35	52	5th	R2	R2			W	UEFA Europa League	1st QR	Mikey Drennan	6
2020	Premier	18	5	6	7	14	17	21	6th	R1							Georgie Kelly	3
2021	Premier	36	18	8	10	56	42	62	2nd	W							Matty Smith	11
2022	Premier	36	18	7	11	57	37	61	4th	R1			RU		UEFA Europa Conference League	3rd QR	Eoin Doyle	14
2023	Premier	36	19	5	12	59	42	62	3rd	W				R4	UEFA Europa Conference League	1st QR	Chris Forrester	13
2024	Premier	36	17	8	11	51	37	59	3rd	R2			RU	W	UEFA Conference League	Play-Off	Jake Mulraney	7
2025	Premier	36	13	13	10	42	32	52	5th	SF				RU	UEFA Conference League	3rd QR	Mason Melia	13
2026	Premier	36	17	9	10	55	31	60	3rd	QF				RU			Ryan Edmondson & Aidan Keena	10

^{1} Deducted 15 points for fielding ineligible players.

== Key ==
Champions	Runners-up	Promoted	Relegated

Division shown in bold when it changes due to promotion or relegation. Top scorers shown in bold are players who finished the season as top scorer of their division.

Key to league record:

- P = Played
- W = Games won
- D = Games drawn
- L = Games lost
- F = Goals for
- A = Goals against
- Pts = Points
- Pos = Final position

Key to divisions:

- Premier = LOI Premier Division

Key to rounds:

- DNQ = Did not qualify
- QR = Qualifying Round
- PR = Preliminary Round
- R1 = First Round
- R2 = Second Round
- R3 = Third Round
- R4 = Fourth Round
- R5 = Fifth Round
- Grp = Group Stage
- QF = Quarter-finals
- SF = Semi-finals
- RU = Runners-up
- W = Winners
