= List of Bohemian F.C. seasons =

This is a list of seasons played by Bohemian F.C. in the League of Ireland.

== Seasons ==
Season	League of Ireland									FAI Cup	League Cup	Leinster Senior Cup	Europe		Other Competitions	
Season	Division	P	W	D	L	F	A	Pts	Pos	FAI Cup	League Cup	Leinster Senior Cup	Europe		Other Competitions	
2002-03	Premier	27	15	9	3	47	27	54	1st	SF	No competition	Competition abandoned	Did not qualify			
2003	Premier	36	18	10	8	58	37	64	2nd	SF	QF		Champions League	QR2		
2004	Premier	36	15	15	6	51	30	60	3rd	R3	RU		UEFA Cup	QR1		
2005	Premier	33	13	6	14	42	47	45	6th	QF	R2		Intertoto Cup	R1		
2006	Premier	30	9	5	16	29	34	29	9th	R3	SF		Did not qualify			
2007	Premier	33	16	10	7	35	17	58	3rd	SF	RU		Did not qualify			
2008	Premier	33	27	4	2	55	13	85	1st	W	QF		Intertoto Cup	R1		
2009	Premier	36	24	5	7	62	21	77	1st	QF	W		Champions League	QR2		
2010	Premier	36	19	10	7	50	29	67	2nd	SF	R2	QF	Champions League	QR2	Setanta Sports Cup	W
2011	Premier	36	17	9	10	39	27	60	5th	SF	R2	RU	Europa League	QR2	Setanta Sports Cup	R1
2012	Premier	30	9	9	12	35	38	36	7th	QF	R2	R4	Europa League	QR1	Setanta Sports Cup	QF
2013	Premier	33	7	8	18	27	47	29	10th	R2	QF	R4	Did not qualify			
2014	Premier	33	9	13	11	40	41	40	7th	QF	SF	QF	Did not qualify			
2015	Premier	33	15	8	10	49	42	53	5th	R3	QF	SF	Did not qualify			
2016	Premier	33	12	5	16	30	37	41	8th	R3	R2	W	Did not qualify			
2017	Premier	33	14	5	14	36	40	47	5th	R1	R2	QF	Did not qualify			
2018	Premier	36	13	9	14	52	45	48	6th	SF	QF	R4	Did not qualify		Scottish Challenge Cup	QF
2019	Premier	36	17	9	10	47	28	60	3rd	SF	SF	SF	Did not qualify		Scottish Challenge Cup	R3
2020	Premier	18	12	1	5	23	12	37	2nd	QF	No competition	Competition abandoned	Europa League	QR1		
2021	Premier	36	14	10	12	61	47	52	5th	RU	No competition	No competition	Europa Conference League	QR3		
2022	Premier	36	12	10	14	45	46	46	6th	QF	No competition	No competition	Did not qualify			
2023	Premier	36	16	10	10	53	50	58	6th	RU	No competition	W	Did not qualify			
2024	Premier	36	10	12	14	39	43	-4	8th	SF	No competition	R4	Did not qualify			
2025	Premier	36	16	6	14	48	39	9	4th	R4	No competition	SF	Did not qualify			
