= 2012–13 Leinster Senior League Senior Division =

Irish football league season

In the 2012–13 season, the Leinster Senior League Senior Division – an Irish regional football league – was won by Crumlin United F.C.

== Final table ==
Pos.	Team	Pld	W	D	L	GF	GA	GD	Pts	Qualification or Relegation
1	Crumlin United	26	16	7	3	43	25	+18	55	Champions
2	Cherry Orchard	26	16	6	4	50	31	+19	54	
3	Bangor Celtic	26	14	5	7	48	34	+14	47	
4	Bluebell United	26	14	5	7	48	40	+8	47	
5	Tolka Rovers	26	12	7	8	58	39	+19	42	
6	Glebe North Athletic	26	11	5	10	51	41	+10	38	
7	Wayside Celtic	26	10	5	11	45	32	+13	35	
8	Mount Merrion YMCA	26	10	4	12	42	39	+3	34	Demoted to LSL 1A
9	Malahide United	26	9	7	10	40	46	-6	34	
10	Phoenix F.C. Navan Road	26	7	8	11	32	39	-7	29	
11	St. Patrick's C.Y.F.C.	26	8	4	14	31	50	-19	28	
12	Firhouse Clover	26	6	7	13	28	46	-18	25	
13	Edenderry Town	26	5	9	12	22	34	-12	24	Relegation to LSL Senior 1
14.	Arklow Town	26	2	6	18	24	66	-42	12	Relegation to LSL Senior 1

== Results ==
Home/Away	ARK	BAC	BLU	CRU	CHO	EDT	FIC	GNA	MLU	MTM	PNR	StP	TKR	WAC
Arklow Town	-	1-4	0-1	0-2	0-2	1-1	0-1	1-1	0-3	0-4	1-1	3-3	2-3	0-0
Bangor Celtic	1-1	-	1-2	2-0	1-2	3-0	3-1	1-1	1-4	3-2	0-3	3-0	2-2	2-0
Bluebell United	5-1	2-3	-	4-2	3-1	1-0	2-1	2-1	2-1	1-3	2-2	1-1	5-3	1-1
Crumlin United	2-1	0-0	2-0	-	3-3	0-0	2-1	2-0	4-1	1-1	2-2	2-1	1-1	1-0
Cherry Orchard	4-1	1-3	3-1	0-2	-	2-0	0-0	2-1	3-1	1-0	0-0	3-0	1-1	1-0
Edenderry Town	3-0	1-0	2-1	1-2	1-2	-	1-1	2-1	3-0	0-1	0-0	1-1	0-2	1-3
Firhouse Clover	2-0	0-1	1-1	1-2	2-2	2-0	-	1-2	2-2	0-2	3-1	0-2	0-5	1-8
Glebe North Athletic	6-1	3-2	2-3	0-1	0-2	1-1	2-0	-	2-3	1-2	2-2	4-1	2-3	2-0
Malahide United	4-2	1-3	0-2	1-1	2-2	1-1	2-1	1-3	-	2-2	2-0	1-0	2-1	0-0
Mount Merrion YMCA	4-2	2-3	3-1	0-2	2-4	1-0	2-2	0-3	3-0	-	1-1	1-2	3-1	3-1
Phoenix F.C. Navan Road	2-1	1-3	1-2	1-2	0-2	1-1	1-2	1-2	2-0	2-1	-	0-2	1-4	2-1
St. Patrick's C.Y.	2-1	0-1	0-1	0-2	2-4	4-2	1-1	1-2	3-2	1-0	1-3	-	2-1	1-4
Tolka Rovers	6-0	3-1	4-1	4-0	4-1	0-0	0-1	4-4	2-2	1-0	0-2	2-0	-	0-2
Wayside Celtic	1-2	1-1	1-1	0-3	1-2	3-0	2-1	2-3	1-2	2-1	2-0	5-0	4-1	-
