= 2011–12 Leinster Senior League Senior Division =

The 2011–12 Leinster Senior League Senior Division

== Final Table ==
Pos.	Team	Pld	W	D	L	GF	GA	GD	Pts	Qualification or Relegation
1	Crumlin United	26	16	8	2	45	17	+28	56	Champions
2	Bluebell United	26	16	4	6	54	31	+23	52	
3	Tolka Rovers	26	12	10	4	56	35	+21	46	
4	Phoenix F.C. Navan Road	26	13	5	8	44	26	+18	44	
5	St. Patrick's C.Y.F.C.	26	13	5	8	53	41	+12	44	
6	Cherry Orchard	26	12	5	9	42	34	+8	41	
7	Firhouse Clover	26	11	7	8	42	39	+3	40	
8	Wayside Celtic	26	12	4	10	42	41	+1	40	
9	Glebe North Athletic	26	9	9	8	40	48	-8	36	
10	Bangor Celtic	26	7	8	11	29	35	-6	29	
11	Mount Merrion YMCA	26	6	4	16	34	44	-10	22	
12	Arklow Town	26	5	6	15	37	57	-20	21	
13	Newbridge Town	26	4	6	16	25	63	-38	18	Relegation to LSL Senior 1
14	Belgrove	26	3	5	18	22	54	-33	14	Relegation to LSL Senior 1

== Results ==
Home/Away	ARK	BAC	BEL	BLU	CRU	CHO	FIC	GNA	MTM	NET	PNR	StP	TKR	WAC
Arklow Town	-	1-2	0-0	0-2	1-2	1-3	3-4	1-3	1-1	1-2	1-2	1-5	3-3	1-2
Bangor Celtic	2-2	-	2-0	0-1	1-4	0-0	0-0	2-4	1-2	3-0	0-0	1-2	0-1	1-2
Belgrove	2-4	2-3	-	0-4	0-1	0-2	0-0	0-1	0-3	0-2	1-5	2-4	1-2	1-2
Bluebell United	1-2	2-1	2-0	-	1-4	5-1	3-1	2-2	1-0	2-1	3-1	3-3	3-0	1-0
Crumlin United	1-1	0-0	3-0	0-0	-	0-0	1-1	6-0	1-0	1-1	3-2	4-0	1-0	0-3
Cherry Orchard	5-0	0-1	2-1	2-1	2-0	-	4-2	0-0	3-1	3-3	2-1	0-2	1-1	2-0
Firhouse Clover	2-3	3-1	2-0	2-1	1-2	2-1	-	2-0	3-1	3-1	1-1	2-0	1-5	0-0
Glebe North Athletic	1-1	1-1	0-1	4-3	0-2	3-1	2-2	-	2-0	1-1	2-2	3-1	0-3	2-2
Mount Merrion YMCA	1-3	3-0	1-1	0-2	2-2	2-1	2-1	3-4	-	5-0	0-4	0-1	1-2	0-1
Newbridge Town	1-4	0-0	4-3	1-3	0-1	0-3	1-2	1-2	2-2	-	0-2	0-0	1-3	2-1
Phoenix F.C. Navan Road	3-0	2-1	0-1	2-4	0-1	2-0	2-0	2-0	2-1	3-0	-	0-1	0-0	4-0
St. Patrick's C.Y.F.C.	3-1	1-3	2-2	3-4	0-2	1-0	2-1	4-1	1-0	4-0	1-1	-	3-3	6-2
Tolka Rovers	2-1	1-2	2-2	0-0	1-1	4-2	3-3	1-1	3-2	6-0	0-1	2-1	-	3-3
Wayside Celtic	2-0	1-1	1-2	1-0	0-2	1-2	0-1	4-1	2-1	5-1	3-0	3-2	1-5	-
