= Leinster Senior League Senior Division =

- Founded: 1896
- Country: (Republic of Ireland) Ireland
- Region: Leinster
- Number of clubs: 14
- Level on pyramid: 4
- Domestic cup(s): Leinster Senior Cup; FAI Intermediate Cup
- League cup(s): Metropolitan Cup; Charlie Cahill Cup
- Current champions: Malahide United (2nd title) (2025–26)
- Most championships: Shelbourne (12 titles)
- Website: LSL.ie/Senior Sunday

The Leinster Senior League Senior Division is the top division of the Leinster Senior League. Also referred to as Senior Sunday the division is organised by the Leinster Football Association. Together with the Munster Senior League Senior Premier Division, it forms the fourth level of the Republic of Ireland football league system. Established in 1896, it is the oldest association football league in the Republic of Ireland.

Clubs from this division play in the Leinster Senior Cup and the FAI Intermediate Cup, through which they can qualify for the FAI Cup. In recent seasons the winners of the Senior Division have also been invited to play in the League of Ireland Cup. Shelbourne have won the most titles.

From 1896–97 until 1964–65, the league was the de facto second-level league in what is now the Republic of Ireland. Initially the Irish Football League was the top level. Then for one season, 1920–21, the Leinster Senior League was briefly the top-level league. However, this status was short-lived and ended with the establishment of the League of Ireland in 1921–22. The Leinster Senior League remained a second-level league until 1964–65, when it was effectively replaced by the League of Ireland B Division. With the establishment of the A Championship in 2008, it became a fourth-level league. However, since the demise of the A Championship in 2011, it has reverted to third-level status.

== 2024–25 teams ==
Senior Sunday

Team	Home town/suburb	Home county	Home ground
Bangor Celtic	Crumlin	County Dublin	The Transport Club
Ballymun United	Ballymun	County Dublin	Ballymun Soccer Complex
Finglas United	Finglas	County Dublin	Larney Park
Inchicore Athletic	Inchicore	County Dublin	Bernard Curtis Park
Kilbarrack United	Kilbarrack	County Dublin	Greendale Road
Killester Donnycarney F.C.	Killester & Donnycarney	County Dublin	Haddon Park
Lucan United	Lucan	County Dublin	O'Hanlon Park, Celbridge
Malahide United	Malahide	County Dublin (Fingal)	Gannon Park
St. Francis F.C.	Baldonnel	County Dublin	John Hyland Park
St. Mochta's F.C.	Porterstown & Clonsilla	County Dublin (Fingal)	Porterstown Road
Tolka Rovers	Glasnevin	County Dublin	Frank Cooke Park
UCD (res.)	Belfield	County Dublin	UCD Bowl
Usher Celtic	Dublin quays	County Dublin	War Memorial Gardens
Wayside Celtic	Kilternan	County Dublin	Jackson Park

== Promotion and relegation ==
Each season, three teams are relegated from the division. Three teams are then promoted to the Senior Division from the division below. While a promotion and relegation system operates within the Leinster Senior League structure itself, there is no formal promotion and relegation relationship with the League of Ireland. Teams can only be "promoted" by sending an application to the FAI.

In the past successful and prominent members of the Leinster Senior League have regularly been invited and/or elected to join the League of Ireland. Current League of Ireland clubs Bohemians, Shelbourne, Shamrock Rovers, Sligo Rovers, St Patrick's Athletic and Bray Wanderers are all former Leinster Senior League champions. While Bohemians and Shelbourne were founding members of the League of Ireland, Shamrock Rovers, Sligo Rovers and St Patrick's Athletic were all effectively "promoted" to the League of Ireland after winning the Leinster Senior League Senior Division title. Incidentally both Rovers and St Pats won successive Leinster Senior League and League of Ireland titles in 1921-22 and 1922-23 and 1950–51 and 1951–52 respectively.

- Current League of Ireland clubs Athlone Town, Dundalk, Longford Town and UCD are also former members of the Leinster Senior League
- Former League of Ireland clubs Drumcondra, Dolphins, Reds United, St James's Gate and Cabinteely have all been Leinster Senior League champions who were then "promoted" or elected to the League of Ireland.
- Shelbourne United, Brideville, Bray Unknowns, Transport, Bray Wanderers, Home Farm and St Francis are all former Leinster Senior League champions who were elected to the League of Ireland several seasons after winning the Leinster title.
- Jacobs, Brideville, Transport and St James's Gate all dropped out of the League of Ireland to play in the Leinster Senior League. All four subsequently won the Senior Division. Brideville and Gate both later rejoined the League of Ireland.

== Reserve Teams ==
Throughout its history the Leinster Senior League Senior Division has regularly featured the reserve teams of League of Ireland teams. The reserve teams of Shelbourne, Bohemians, Shamrock Rovers, St Patrick's Athletic, Brideville, Drumcondra and Dolphins have all been Senior Division champions in their own right. The reserve teams of Cabinteely and UCD currently play in the lower levels of the Leinster Senior League.

== History ==
=== Foundation ===
A few years after the Leinster Football Association was formed in 1892, the Leinster Senior Football League was established. While the league's official website states that the league was founded in 1896, Ciarán Priestley highlighted a printed notice in the 4 September 1894 edition of The Irish Times. Under the headline "Leinster Football League", the notice reported of "a general meeting of the league... held the other evening at 27 D'Olier Street". Priestley lists Bohemians, Britannia, Dublin University, Leinster Nomads, Phoenix and Montpelier (Note: A short-lived Dublin club, sometimes spelt "Montpellier", that was founded in 1889 by former players from Beechmount in Belfast.) as participants in the league's first season. However, other sources suggest the league started a little later and was first played for in 1897–98 with an unidentified British Army regimental team (Note: This was possibly Sherwood Foresters. Based in the Curragh, County Kildare, Foresters were runners-up to Cliftonville in the 1896–97 IFA Cup final.) winning the inaugural title while Shelbourne were runners-up.

=== Bohemians and Shelbourne era ===
Up until the 1920s the league was dominated by Bohemians and Shelbourne. These two clubs still remain the league's two most successful teams based on titles they won in this era. Even when Bohemians and Shelbourne joined the Irish Football League in 1902 and 1904 respectively, their reserve teams continued to win titles regularly. Initially only St James's Gate and British Army regimental teams challenged the Bohemians/Shelbourne duopoly. During the First World War the Irish Football League was suspended and the senior teams of both Bohemians and Shelbourne rejoined the Leinster Senior League. Meanwhile, their northern counterparts competed in the Belfast & District League. The 1919–20 saw a return to an all-Ireland league. However further disruption caused by the Irish War of Independence meant this was short-lived and at the end of this season Bohemians and Shelbourne withdrew from the Irish Football League permanently. They subsequently rejoined the Leinster Senior League and for the 1920–21 season. The league now briefly became the top level league in what is now the Republic of Ireland. 1920–21 also saw Shelbourne United emerge as champions, becoming only the fourth civilian team to win the title.

=== 1920s ===
The 1921–22 season saw the establishment of the League of Ireland and this had a considerable impact on the Leinster Senior League. All eight founding League of Ireland members – Shelbourne, Bohemians, St James's Gate, Jacobs, Olympia, Dublin United, Frankfort and YMCA – had all spent the previous season playing in the Leinster Senior League. The emergence of the League of Ireland thus created a number of vacancies in the Senior Division and among the clubs who filled them were Shamrock Rovers. For the 1921–22 season Rovers were joined in the Senior Division by Bohemians B, St James's Gate B, Bray Unknowns, Midland Athletic, Pioneers, Brooklyn, Shelbourne United, Merrion, Glasnevin, CYMS and Richmond. With a team that included John Joe Flood, William Glen, Bob Fullam and Dinny Doyle, Rovers won the Senior Division and reached the 1921–22 FAI Cup final. The 1922–23 season saw the League of Ireland expand to twelve teams. After Frankfort and YMCA dropped out, six new teams – Shamrock Rovers, Midland Athletic, Pioneers, Shelbourne United, Athlone Town and Rathmines Athletic – were invited to join. Once again the Leinster Senior League provided most of the League of Ireland's newest members. Further vacancies in the Senior Division were now created and among the clubs who subsequently filled them were Brideville, Dolphins, Dundalk and Drumcondra. Like Shelbourne United and Shamrock Rovers before them, Bray Unknowns, Brideville, Drumcondra and Dolphins all won the Leinster Senior League title and were then invited to join the League of Ireland. Brooklyn were also elected to the League of Ireland for the 1923–24 season. Dundalk joined the Leinster Senior League in 1922–23. They were runners up in 1923–24 and then finished third in 1925–26 before making their League of Ireland debut in 1926–27. While playing in Leinster Senior League, Drumcondra also won an FAI Intermediate Cup / FAI Cup double in 1926–27.

=== 1930s ===
During the 1930s three more Leinster Senior League champions made the step up to the League of Ireland. These included Sligo Rovers, Brideville and Reds United. At the end of the 1931–32 League of Ireland season Brideville dropped out. However 1932–33 saw them win their second Leinster Senior League title. 1932–33 also Sligo Rovers join the Leinster Senior League. In their first season they finished third. During the season they had twice beaten the champions Brideville and also defeated Bohemians B. In 1933–34 Sligo Rovers achieved a treble, winning the Leinster Senior League, the FAI Intermediate Cup and the LFA Metropolitan Cup. On the back of this success, they joined the League of Ireland for the 1934–35 season. The following season, 1935–36 saw Brideville return to the League of Ireland along with the 1934–35 Leinster Senior League champions, Reds United. During the late 1930s and 1940s the Leinster Senior League's most successful team was Distillery. They won the title five times during period. However unlike some of their contemporaries, Distillery never moved up the League of Ireland.

=== St Patrick's Athletic era ===
During the late 1940s and 1950s the strongest team in the Leinster Senior League was St Patrick's Athletic. During this period they won the league title on six occasions. This included four successive titles between 1947–48 and 1950–51. In 1947–48 St Pat's completed a treble after also winning both the FAI Intermediate Cup and Leinster Senior Cup. The 1948–49 season would see St Pat's win a Leinster Senior League / FAI Intermediate Cup. In 1950–51 a young Shay Gibbons helped St Pat's win the Leinster Senior League title for a fourth time. St Pat's were subsequently invited to join the 1951–52 League of Ireland and went on to win their first League of Ireland title at their first attempt. With St Pat's first team now in the League of Ireland, their reserve team won two further Leinster Senior League titles in 1955–56 and 1956–57.

=== 1980s ===
Bluebell were one of the strongest teams in the division during the 1980s, winning the league four times and finishing as runners-up on four occasions during the decade. Ahead of the 1988–89 season, the league was reorganised with Division 1 replaced by the new Senior Division.

=== Millennium ===
At the turn of the century, the league was dominated by four teams with only Crumlin United, Cherry Orchard, Wayside Celtic and Bangor Celtic winning the title. After 14 seasons, Bluebell United broke the dominance by becoming the 2014–15 Leinster Senior League champions, ending their own 27-year wait for a Charlie Beahan Cup.

== List of winners by club ==
- Brackets indicate a victory for the club's reserve team.

Team	Titles	Seasons won
Shelbourne	12	1902–03, 1903–04, (1906–07), (1907–08), (1908–09), (1910–11), 1915–16, 1916–17, 1918–19, (1923–24), (1942–43), (1943–44)
Bohemians	8	1899–1900, 1900–01, 1901–02, (1904–05), (1912–13), (1913–14), 1917–18, (1931–32)
Bluebell United	7	1981–82, 1983–84, 1985–86, 1986–87, 2014–15, 2015–16, 2017–18
Crumlin United	7	2007–08, 2009–10, 2011–12, 2012–13, 2013–14, 2018–19, 2021–22
Cherry Orchard	6	1993–94, 1994–95, 1996–97, 2000–01, 2001–02, 2006–07
St. James Gate	6	1909–10, 1911–12, 1914–15, 1919–20, 1987–88, 1988–89
T.E.K. United	6	1964–65, 1965–66, 1968–69, 1970–71, 1974–75, 1977–78
St. Patrick's Athletic	6	1947–48, 1948–49, 1949–50, 1950–51, (1955–56), (1956–57)
Wayside Celtic	5	1997–98, 2002–03, 2003–04, 2005–06, 2010–11
Distillery (Dublin)	5	1935–36, 1937–38, 1938–39, 1940–41, 1941–42
St. Francis	4	1989–90, 1991–92, 1992–93, 1995–96
Jacobs	4	1952–53, 1953–54, 1954–55, 1967–68
Drumcondra	4	1927–28, (1928–29), (1945–46), (1951–52)
Bray Wanderers	3	1957–58, 1958–59, 1959–60
Pegasus	3	1975–76, 1978–79, 1980–81
Shamrock Rovers/B	3	1921–22, (1924–25), (1939–40)
St. Mochta's F.C.	3	2016–17, 2022–23, 2024–25
British Army^{See; Note 1}	3	1897–98, 1898–99, 1905–06
Malahide United	2	2019–20, 2025–26
Bangor Celtic	2	2004–05, 2008–09
Hammond Lane	2	1979–80, 1982–83
Rialto	2	1969–70, 1972–73
Home Farm	2	1960–61, 1963–64
Transport	2	1946–47, 1962–63
Brideville	2	(1925–26), 1932–33
Dolphin	2	1929–30, (1930–31)
Lucan United	1	2023–24
Newbridge Town	1	1998–99
Glanmire Celtic	1	1990–91
St. Mary's (Athlone)	1	1984–85
Aer Lingus	1	1976–77
CYM Terenure	1	1973–74
St. Brendan's	1	1971–72
Glebe North Athletic	1	1966–67
Workman's Club (Dunleary)	1	1961–62
Bradmola	1	1944–45
Fearon's Athletic	1	1936–37
Reds United	1	1934–35
Sligo Rovers	1	1933–34
Bendigo	1	1926–27
Shelbourne United	1	1920–21
Bray Unknowns	1	1922–23

== List of winners by season ==
Season	Winner	Runners-up
2025–26	Malahide United	Kilbarrack United
2024–25	St. Mochta's F.C.	Kilbarrack United
2023–24	Lucan United	St. Mochta's F.C.
2022–23	St. Mochta's F.C.	Maynooth Town
2021–22	Crumlin United	St. Mochta's F.C.
2020–21	Competition not held due to Coronavirus pandemic	
2019–20	Malahide United	St. Mochta's F.C.
2018–19	Crumlin United	Killester United
2017–18	Bluebell United	Crumlin United
2016–17	St. Mochta's F.C.	Bluebell United
2015–16	Bluebell United	Firhouse Clover
2014–15	Bluebell United	Drumcondra F.C.
2013–14	Crumlin United	Tolka Rovers
2012–13	Crumlin United	Cherry Orchard
2011–12	Crumlin United	Bluebell United
2010–11	Wayside Celtic	Bluebell United
2009–10	Crumlin United	Bluebell United
2008–09	Bangor Celtic	Tolka Rovers
2007–08	Crumlin United	Bangor Celtic
2006–07	Cherry Orchard	Bangor Celtic
2005–06	Wayside Celtic	Malahide United
2004–05	Bangor Celtic	Belgrove F.C.
2003–04	Wayside Celtic	Belgrove F.C.
2002–03	Wayside Celtic	Glenmore Dundrum
2001–02	Cherry Orchard	Dublin Bus F.C.
2000–01	Cherry Orchard	Wayside Celtic
1999-2000		
1998-99	Newbridge Town	Cherry Orchard
1997-98	Wayside Celtic	Cherry Orchard
1996-97	Cherry Orchard	
1995-96	St. Francis	Cherry Orchard
1994-95	Cherry Orchard	Ashtown Villa
1993-94	Cherry Orchard	Glanmire Celtic
1992-93	St. Francis	Glanmire Celtic
1991-92	St. Francis	Ballyfermot United
1990-91	Glanmire Celtic	St. Francis
1989-90	St. Francis	St. James Gate
1988–89	St. James Gate	Bluebell United
1987–88	St. James Gate	Bluebell United
1986–87	Bluebell United	T.E.K. United
1985–86	Bluebell United	T.E.K. United
1984–85	St. Mary's (Athlone)	Bluebell United
1983–84	Bluebell United	Dun Leary Celtic
1982–83	Hammond Lane	Bluebell United
1981–82	Bluebell United	St. Joseph's Boys
1980-81	Pegasus	Railway Union
1979-80	Hammond Lane	AIB
1978-79	Pegasus	Bray Wanderers
1977-78	T.E.K. United	Workman's Club (Dunleary)
1976-77	Aer Lingus	Bluebell United
1975-76	Pegasus	Parkvilla
1974-75	T.E.K. United	CYM Terenure
1973-74	CYM Terenure	Transport
1972-73	Rialto	T.E.K. United
1971-72	St. Brendan's	T.E.K. United
1970–71	T.E.K. United	St. James Gate
1969-70	Rialto	
1968-69	T.E.K. United	Jacobs
1967-68	Jacobs	Transport
1966-67	Glebe North Athletic	T.E.K. United
1965-66	T.E.K. United	Belgrove
1964-65	T.E.K. United	Transport
1963-64	Home Farm	
1962-63	Transport	
1961-62	Workman's Club (Dunleary)	Ormeau
1960-61	Home Farm	Shelbourne Reserves
1959-60	Bray Wanderers	Chapelizod
1958-59	Bray Wanderers	
1957-58	Bray Wanderers	
1956-57	St Patrick's Athletic Reserves	Workman's Club (Dunleary)
1955-56	St Patrick's Athletic Reserves	
1954-55	Jacobs	
1953-54	Jacobs	Longford Town
1952-53	Jacobs	
1951-52	Drumcondra Reserves	
1950-51	St. Patrick's Athletic	
1949-50	St. Patrick's Athletic	
1948-49	St. Patrick's Athletic	
1947-48	St. Patrick's Athletic	Transport
1946-47	Transport	
1945-46	Drumcondra Reserves	
1944-45	Bradmola	Drumcondra Reserves
1943-44	Shelbourne Reserves	
1942-43	Shelbourne Reserves	
1941-42	Distillery (Dublin)	
1940-41	Distillery (Dublin)	
1939-40	Shamrock Rovers B	
1938-39	Distillery (Dublin)	
1937-38	Distillery (Dublin)	
1936-37	Fearon's Athletic	
1935-36	Distillery (Dublin)	
1934-35	Reds United	
1933-34	Sligo Rovers	Distillery (Dublin)
1932-33	Brideville	Bohemians Reserves
1931-32	Bohemians Reserves	
1930-31	Dolphin	
1929-30	Dolphin	
1928-29	Drumcondra Reserves	Edenville
1927-28	Drumcondra	
1926-27	Bendigo	
1925-26	Brideville	
1924-25	Shamrock Rovers B	
1923-24	Shelbourne Reserves	Dundalk GNR
1922-23	Bray Unknowns	
1921-22	Shamrock Rovers	
1920-21	Shelbourne United	
1919-20	St. James Gate	
1918-19	Shelbourne	
1917-18	Bohemians	Shelbourne
1916-17	Shelbourne	
1915-16	Shelbourne	
1914-15	St. James Gate	
1913-14	Bohemians Reserves	
1912-13	Bohemians Reserves	
1911-12	St. James Gate	
1910-11	Shelbourne Reserves	
1909-10	St. James Gate	
1908-09	Shelbourne Reserves	
1907-08	Shelbourne Reserves	
1906-07	Shelbourne Reserves	
1905-06	British Army	
1904-05	Bohemians Reserves	
1903-04	Shelbourne	
1902-03	Shelbourne	
1901-02	Bohemians	
1900-01	Bohemians	
1899-1900	Bohemians	
1898-99	British Army	
1897-98	British Army^{See Note 1}	Shelbourne
