= 2006 FAI Cup =

Tournament details
- Country: Republic of Ireland
- Teams: 42

Final positions
- Champions: Derry City
- Runners-up: St Patrick's Athletic

Tournament statistics
- Matches played: 49
- Goals scored: 134 (2.73 per match)

The FAI Cup 2006 was the 86th staging of The Football Association of Ireland Challenge Cup or FAI Cup. This season's competition was the last to be sponsored by Carlsberg. It officially kicked off in late April, when twenty clubs from the junior and intermediate leagues battled it out for the chance to face League of Ireland opposition in the second round. The ten winners of those ties were joined in the second round by the 22 League of Ireland clubs. The competition ran until early December, with the final taking place on Sunday, December 3.

== First round ==
Matches played on the weekend of Saturday, 23 April 2006.

Tie no	Home team	Score	Away team
1	Waterford Crystal	4–1	Garda AFC
2	Castlebar Celtic	5–1	Fairview CYM
3	Ashtown Villa	2–2	Wayside Celtic
4	Tolka Rovers	1–3	Carrigaline United
5	College Corinthians	2–2	Blarney United
6	Brendanville	0–1	Douglas Hall
7	Malahide United	1–1	Fanad United
8	Athenry	0–0	Bangor Celtic
9	Killester United	6–1	St. Mochta's
10	Crumlin United	0–0	Avondale United

== Second round ==
Matches played on the weekend of Sunday, 28 May 2006.

Tie no	Home team	Score	Away team
1	Longford Town	2–1	Cork City
2	Athlone Town	2–1	Galway United
3	Bohemians	3–1	Waterford Crystal
4	Bray Wanderers	2–2	Kildare County
replay	Kildare County	0–1	Bray Wanderers
5	Waterford United	5–0	Douglas Hall
6	Limerick	0–0	Drogheda United
replay	Drogheda United	0–1	Limerick
7	Dundalk	1–0	Cobh Ramblers
8	Blarney United	1–3	Derry City
9	Bangor Celtic	1–3	Shelbourne
10	Carrigaline United	0–4	Sligo Rovers
11	Kilkenny City	0–2	UCD
12	Dublin City	0–0	Monaghan United
replay	Monaghan United	2–4	Dublin City
13	Finn Harps	1–0	Crumlin United
14	Castlebar Celtic	0–2	Shamrock Rovers
15	Malahide United	0–2	St Patrick's Athletic
16	Wayside Celtic	0–1	Killester United

== Third round ==
Matches played on the weekend of Sunday, 27 August 2006.

Tie no	Home team	Score	Away team
1	Shamrock Rovers	1–1	Bohemians
replay	Bohemians	0–2	Shamrock Rovers
2	Waterford United	1–1	Longford Town
replay	Longford Town	1–0	Waterford United
3	UCD	3–1	Limerick
4	St Patrick's Athletic	2–0	Dundalk
5	Finn Harps	0–0	Athlone Town
replay	Athlone Town	3–2	Finn Harps
6	Sligo Rovers	2–1	Bray Wanderers
7	Shelbourne	0–1	Derry City
8	Killester United	w/o	Dublin City

== Quarter-finals ==
Matches played on the weekend of Sunday, 1 October.

29 September 2006

St Patrick's Athletic	4–1	Longford Town
Molloy 3', 61', 78' (pen.); Foley 26' (pen.)		Martin 69'

Richmond Park, Dublin

30 September 2006

Athlone Town	1–2	Shamrock Rovers
Sheridan 38'		Rowe 82'; Clarke 90'

St. Mel's Park, Athlone

30 September 2006

Sligo Rovers	0–0	Killester United

The Showgrounds, Sligo

1 October 2006

Derry City	2–0	UCD
Farren 65' pen McHugh 67'

The Brandywell, Derry

=== Replay ===
Killester United	3–4 (a.e.t.)	Sligo Rovers
Keogh 19', 77'; Lacey 51'		Bellew 11'; Hughes 44'; Peers 67'; McTiernan 102'

== Semi-finals ==
27 October 2006

Shamrock Rovers	0–2	St Patrick's Athletic
		Keegan 18'; Molloy (?)

Tolka Park, Dublin

29 October 2006

Sligo Rovers	0–0	Derry City

The Showgrounds, Sligo

=== Replay ===
31 October 2006

Derry City	5–0	Sligo Rovers
McCourt 33'; Farren 39' (pen.), 46'; Martyn 42', 90+1'

The Brandywell, Derry

== Final ==
The final was the last at the old Lansdowne Road.

3 December 2006
15:15

Derry City	4–3 (a.e.t.)	St Patrick's Athletic
M. Farren 25'; C. Delaney 84'; P. Hutton 106'; S. Brennan 109' (o.g.)	Report	D. Mulcahy 19'; T. Molloy 74' (pen.); S. O'Connor 103'

Lansdowne Road, Dublin
Attendance: 16,022
Referee: Damien Hancock

Winner of FAI Cup 2006

Derry City
4th Title
