= 2007 FAI Cup =

FAI Ford Cup

Tournament details
- Country: Ireland

Final positions
- Champions: Cork City
- Runners-up: Longford Town

The FAI Cup 2007 was the 87th staging of The Football Association of Ireland Challenge Cup or FAI Cup. The competition was sponsored by Ford, their first year sponsoring the FAI Cup after replacing Carlsberg as the main sponsor.

The 2007 FAI Ford Cup officially kicked off in late April, when twenty clubs from the junior and intermediate leagues battled it out for the chance to face eircom League of Ireland opposition in the second round.

The ten winners of those ties were joined in the second round by the 22 eircom League of Ireland clubs.

The competition ran until early December, with the final taking place on 2 December 2007.

== First round ==
Matches played on the weekend of Sunday, 22 April 2007.

Tie no	Home team	Score	Away team
1	Phoenix F.C.	5–1	College Corinthians
2	Cherry Orchard	2–0	Villa F.C.
3	Mayfield United	0–1	St. Mochta's
4	Celbridge Town	1–0	Killester United
5	Drogheda Town	0–1	St. John Bosco
6	Fanad United	2–0	Bangor Celtic
7	Kildrum Tigers	1–2	Malahide United
8	Douglas Hall	2–1	Crumlin United
9	Salthill Devon	1–0	Avondale United
10	Tolka Rovers	3–1	Belgrove

== Second round ==
Matches played on the weekend of Sunday, 17 June 2007. The draw took place on Thursday, 31 May 2007 and was made by Emma Byrne and Paddy McCaul, and televised live on RTÉ One.

Tie no	Home team	Score	Away team
1	Longford Town	1–0	Celbridge Town
2	Fanad United	1–0	St. John Bosco
3	Dundalk	3–0	Athlone Town
4	Limerick 37	1–1	Wexford Youths
replay	Wexford Youths	0–1	Limerick 37
5	Phoenix	0–4	St Patrick's Athletic
6	Salthill Devon	0–4	UCD
7	Bray Wanderers	7–0	St. Mochta's
8	Kildare County	0–1	Kilkenny City
9	Tolka Rovers	2–2	Waterford United
replay	Waterford United	4–1	Tolka Rovers
10	Derry City	2–0	Monaghan United
11	Galway United	2–2	Finn Harps
replay	Finn Harps	0–0	Galway United
Finn Harps won 4–2 on penalties
12	Douglas Hall	4–1	Cobh Ramblers
13	Shamrock Rovers	2–3	Sligo Rovers
14	Drogheda United	0–1	Bohemians
15	Malahide United	2–1	Cherry Orchard
16	Shelbourne	0–1	Cork City

== Third round ==
Matches played on the weekend of Sunday, 19 August 2007. The draw took place on Thursday, 5 July 2007 and was made by David Flood and Steve Staunton, and televised live on RTÉ One.

Tie no	Home team	Score	Away team
1	Finn Harps	0–1	Derry City
2	Limerick 37	1–1	Douglas Hall
replay	Douglas Hall	0–1	Limerick 37
3	Dundalk	1–2	UCD
4	Waterford United	1–1	Sligo Rovers
replay	Sligo Rovers	2–2	Waterford United
Waterford United won 4–3 on penalties
5	Bray Wanderers	1–2	St Patrick's Athletic
6	Longford Town	2–0	Fanad United
7	Malahide United	0–1	Bohemians
8	Cork City	5–1	Kilkenny City

== Quarter-finals ==
Matches to be played weekend of Sunday, 23 September. The draw took place on Monday, 27 August 2007 and was made by David Flood and Ronnie Whelan, and televised live on RTÉ One.

24 September 2007
19:45

St Patrick's Athletic	1–2	Bohemians
Keith Fahey 57'	Report	Darren Mansaram 25', 64'

Richmond Park, Dublin
Referee: Alan Kelly

21 September 2007
19:45

Derry City	0–1	UCD
	Report	Conor Sammon 60'

The Brandywell, Derry
Attendance: 2,450
Referee: Damien Hancock

22 September 2007
19:30

Longford Town	3–1	Limerick 37
Dessie Baker 71'; David Mooney 81'; Jamie Duffy 90'	Report	John Tierney 85'

Flancare Park, Longford
Referee: Declan Haney

22 September 2007
19:45

Waterford United	1–1	Cork City
Dave Warren 10'	Report	Denis Behan 49'

Regional Sports Centre, Waterford
Attendance: 1,009
Referee: Pat Whelan

=== Replays ===
25 September 2007
19:45

Cork City	4–0	Waterford United
Denis Behan 11', 35', 84'; Liam Kearney 61'	Report

Turner's Cross, Cork
Referee: Pat Whelan

== Semi-finals ==
Matches to be played weekend of Sunday, 28 October. The draw took place on Wednesday, 10 October, and was made by Paddy McCaul and Kevin MacDonald and was televised live on RTÉ One.

26 October 2007
19:35

Bohemians	0–2	Cork City
	Report	Liam Kearney 24', 77'

Dalymount Park, Dublin
Referee: Damien Hancock

28 October 2007
15:15

UCD	0–1	Longford Town
	Report	Robbie Martin 39'

Belfield Park, Dublin
Attendance: 1,250
Referee: Anthony Buttimer

== Final ==
2 December 2007
15:30

Cork City	1–0	Longford Town
Denis Behan 60'

RDS, Dublin
Attendance: ~10,000
Referee: Dave McKeon

Winner of FAI Cup 2007

Cork City
2nd Title

== Player of the Round ==
Round	Name	Position	Club
1	John Lawlor	Defender	Malahide United
2	Brendan Sweeney	Midfielder	Douglas Hall
3	Daryl Kavanagh	Striker	Waterford United
Quarter-Finals	Conor Sammon	Striker	UCD
