= YMCA F.C. =

YMCA F.C. may refer to:

- Dumfries YMCA F.C., a Scottish football club from the town of Dumfries in Scotland
- Horsham YMCA F.C., a football club based in Horsham, West Sussex, England
- Mount Merrion YMCA F.C., a football club based in Mount Merrion, Dublin, Ireland.
- YMCA F.C. (Belfast), a former Irish football club based in Belfast, formed by the members of the Belfast YMCA
- YMCA F.C. (Dublin), an Irish football club based in Sandymount, Dublin
- YMCA F.C. (Brisbane), an Australian football club based in Brisbane
- YMCA FC (Timor-Leste), an East Timorese football club based in Dili
