= Distillery F.C. =

Distillery F.C. may refer to

- Lisburn Distillery F.C. - Active football team based in Lisburn, Northern Ireland
- Distillery F.C. (Dublin) - Defunct football team based in Dublin, Ireland
