= 2015 FAI Cup =

FAI Irish Daily Mail Cup

Tournament details
- Country: Republic of Ireland
- Teams: 40

Final positions
- Champions: Dundalk
- Runners-up: Cork City

Tournament statistics
- Matches played: 39, plus replays

The 2015 FAI Senior Challenge Cup, also known as the 2015 FAI Irish Daily Mail Senior Cup for sponsorship reasons, was the 95th season of the national football competition of the Republic of Ireland. The winners of the competition earned a spot in the first qualifying round of the 2016–17 UEFA Europa League.

A total of 40 teams competed in the 2015 competition, which commenced in March 2015. The teams entered from the 2015 League of Ireland Premier Division and First Division received byes into the second round stage. Four non-league clubs also received byes to the second round. The remaining 12 teams entered at the first round stage. These non-league teams are composed of the sixteen clubs, which reached the fourth round of the 2014–15 FAI Intermediate Cup, and the semi-finalists of the FAI Junior Cup in 2014–15.

Dundalk won the cup after a 1–0 win against Cork City in the final on 8 November.

== Teams ==
Round	Clubs remaining	Clubs involved	Winners from previous round	New entries this round	Leagues entering at this round
First round	40	16	N/A	16	Leinster Senior League; Munster Senior League; Ulster Senior League
Second round	32	32	8	24	League of Ireland
Third round	16	16	16	none	none
Quarter-finals	8	8	8	none	none
Semi-Finals	4	4	4	none	none
Final	2	2	2	none	none

== First round ==
The draw for the First Round of the FAI Cup was made on 7 April 2015 at Abbotstown by FAI President Tony Fitzgerald and Brendan Clarke. 20 intermediate and junior clubs were present in the draw.

24 April	St. Mary's A.F.C.	0–1	Avondale United
19:30		Report	Roy Long (pen.)

25 April	College Corinthians A.F.C.	0–1	Crumlin United
14:00		Report

25 April	Cobh Wanderers FC	2–0	Clonmel Celtic
14:30		Report

25 April	Cockhill Celtic F.C.	1–0	Casement Celtic
17:00		Report

26 April	Killester United	3–0	Dunboyne AFC
14:30		Report

26 April	UCC	0–4	North End United
15:00		Report

26 April	St. Mochta's	5–2	Arklow Town
11:00		Report

26 April	Glenville	0–1	Firhouse Clover
11:00		Report

== Second round ==
The draw for the Second Round of the FAI Cup was made on 6 May 2015 at the Aviva Stadium by Paul McGrath and FAI President Tony Fitzgerald and contained 32 teams, with the 20 League of Ireland teams entering the competition. Ties played on the weekend ending 31 May 2015.

29 May	Tolka Rovers	2–1	Waterford United	Frank Cooke Park, Dublin
		Report

29 May	Dundalk F.C.	5–0	Shelbourne F.C.	Oriel Park
		Report

29 May	Longford Town F.C.	1-1	Finn Harps F.C.	City Calling Stadium/Finn Park
		Report; Report

29 May	Wexford Youths	0–2	Cork City F.C.	Ferrycarrig Park
		Report

29 May	Galway United F.C.	1–0	North End United	Terryland Park
		Report

29 May	Drogheda United F.C.	3–1	Cabinteely F.C.	United Park
		Report

29 May	Saint Patrick's Athletic	2–1	Shamrock Rovers F.C.	Richmond Park
		Report; Report

29 May	Bohemian F.C.	4–1	Firhouse Clover	Dalymount Park
		Report

29 May	Bray Wanderers	3–1	Limerick F.C.	Carlisle Grounds
		Report

30 May	Athlone Town F.C.	3–2	Liffey Wanderers F.C.	Athlone Town Stadium
		Report

30 May	Killester United	3–0	Cobh Ramblers	Hadden Park
		Report

31 May	Sligo Rovers	2–0	Crumlin United F.C.	The Showgrounds
		Report

31 May	University College Dublin	1–3	Sheriff Y.C.	Belfield Bowl
		Report

31 May	Cockhill Celtic F.C.	3–0	St. Mochta's	Charlie O'Donnell Sports Grounds
		Report

31 May	Cobh Wanderers FC	3-3	Avondale United	Oldchurch Park/Avondale Park
		Report; Report

31 May	Edenderry Town F.C.	0–3	Derry City F.C.	Father Paul Park
		Report

== Third round ==
The draw for the third round took place in Sligo on 17 July and was made by Republic of Ireland manager Martin O'Neill and FAI president Tony Fitzgerald. Fixtures were played on the weekend of August 23.

22 August	Cockhill Celtic F.C.	0–2	Longford Town F.C.	Charlie O'Donnell Sports Grounds
		Report

21 August	Tolka Rovers	0–4	Killester United	Frank Cooke Park
		Report

21 August	Galway United F.C.	1–4	Dundalk F.C.	Eamonn Deacy Park
		Report		Attendance: 761; Referee: Robert Rogers

21 August	Derry City F.C.	3–0	Drogheda United F.C.	The Brandywell
		Report

21 August	Sheriff Y.C.	2-2	Athlone Town F.C.	Clontarf Astro/Athlone Town Stadium
		Report; Report

21 August	Bohemian F.C.	0–1	Bray Wanderers	Dalymount Park
		Report

22 August	Cobh Wanderers FC	0–4	Sligo Rovers	Oldchurch Park
		Report

21 August	Cork City F.C.	4–0	Saint Patrick's Athletic	Turners Cross
		Report		Attendance: 1,748; Referee: Paul McLaughlin

== Quarter-final ==
The draw for the quarter-finals of the Irish Daily Mail FAI Cup were made on 23 August with Irish under 21 manager Noel King and FAI Director of Competitions Fran Gavin overseeing proceedings. Ties were played on Friday 11 September. The draw featured 6 League of Ireland Premier Division teams and 2 non-league sides.

Bray Wanderers	2–0	Killester United	Carlisle Grounds
	Report

Derry City F.C.	1–1	Cork City F.C.	The Brandywell
	Report

Longford Town F.C.	3–1	Sheriff Y.C.	City Calling Stadium
	Report

Dundalk F.C.	4–0	Sligo Rovers F.C.	Oriel Park
	Report

== Semi finals ==
The draw was made by former Republic of Ireland international Keith Fahey, who was a member of the St Patrick’s Athletic team that won the trophy in 2014, and Fran Gavin, Director of Competitions at the Football Association of Ireland. The draw was broadcast live on RTE Radio One’s Morning Ireland programme and also on RTE News Now. On Friday 2 October Dundalk defeated Longford Town 2 - 0. Cork City defeated Bray Wanderers 1-0 on Sunday 4 October. The match was broadcast live on RTÉ2.

2 October	Dundalk F.C.	2–0	Longford Town F.C.	Oriel Park
		Report

4 October	Bray Wanderers	0–1	Cork City F.C.	Carlisle Grounds
		Report

== Final ==
8 November 2015	Dundalk	1–0 (a.e.t.)	Cork City	Aviva Stadium
15:30	Richie Towell 107'	Report		Attendance: 25,103; Referee: David McKeon
