= 2008 FAI Cup =

FAI Ford Cup

Tournament details
- Country: Republic of Ireland

Final positions
- Champions: Bohemians
- Runners-up: Derry City

The 2008 FAI Cup, known as the FAI Ford Cup for sponsorship reasons, was the 88th staging of the Football Association of Ireland Challenge Cup. The tournament is the primary domestic cup competition for association football in the Republic of Ireland. This edition featured teams from the League of Ireland Premier Division, First Division and A Championship, as well as teams from the regional leagues of the Republic of Ireland football league system.

The FAI Cup officially kicked off on 30 March 2008, when four clubs from the Intermediate and Junior leagues battled it out in the first round for the opportunity to join 18 A Championship, Intermediate and Junior clubs in the second round. This was the second season that the competition was sponsored by Ford.

The ten winners of the second round ties were joined in the Third Round by 12 Premier Division and 10 First Division clubs.

The competition ran until late November, with the final taking place on Sunday, 23 November 2008 at the RDS.

== First round ==
Fixtures were played on the weekend of Sunday 30 March 2008.

Tie no	Home team	Score	Away team
1	Fanad United	2–0	Carrigaline United
2	Douglas Hall	4–0	Castlebar Celtic

== Second round ==
Fixtures were played on the weekend of Sunday 20 April 2008.

Tie no	Home team	Score	Away team
1	Corduff	0–1^{1}	St. Mary's
2	Avondale United	0–1	Drogheda Town
3	Douglas Hall	1–0	Belgrove
4	Crumlin United	0–0	Liffeys Pearse
replay	Liffeys Pearse	2–0	Crumlin United
5	Salthill Devon	0–1	Rockmount
6	Killester United	2–1	Bangor Celtic
7	Swilly Rovers	1–4	Wayside Celtic
8	St. James Gate	2–3	Carrick United
9	Everton	3–1	Tullamore Town
10	Lissadel United	0–2	Fanad United

^{1}Played on April 13, 2008, as Corduff FC gave up home advantage in tie due to unavailability of side on April 20.

== Third round ==
Matches played on the weekend of Sunday, 8 June 2008. The draw took place on Monday, 12 May 2008 and was made by Giovanni Trapattoni and Marco Tardelli, and televised live on RTÉ Two.

Tie no	Home team	Score	Away team
1	Wexford Youths	0–0	Killester United
replay	Killester United	1–2	Wexford Youths
2	Galway United	1–0	Waterford United
3	Douglas Hall	0–3	Drogheda United
4	Everton	0–2	Carrick United
5	Shelbourne	0–3	Dundalk
6	Rockmount	0–3	Bray Wanderers
7	Monaghan United	0–0	UCD
replay	UCD	0–1	Monaghan United
8	Limerick 37	0–2	Cork City
9	St Patrick's Athletic	2–1	Longford Town
10	Kildare County	3–0	Fanad United
11	Athlone Town	2–1	Finn Harps
12	Derry City	2–0	Liffeys Pearse
13	Sporting Fingal	2–0	Cobh Ramblers
14	Bohemians	3–0	Drogheda Town
15	Shamrock Rovers	2–1	Sligo Rovers
16	St Mary's	0–1	Wayside Celtic

== Fourth round ==
Matches played on the weekend of Sunday, 17 August 2008. The draw took place on Monday, 7 July 2008 and televised live on RTÉ Two.

Tie no	Home team	Score	Away team
1	Bray Wanderers	0–0	Dundalk
replay	Dundalk	1–3	Bray Wanderers
2	Shamrock Rovers	0–1	Cork City
3	Galway United	4–1	Athlone Town
4	Carrick United	1–3	Sporting Fingal
5	Wayside Celtic	1–0	Monaghan United
6	Derry City	6–0	Kildare County
7	Bohemians	1–0	Drogheda United
8	Wexford Youths	1–3	St Patrick's Athletic

== Quarter-finals ==
Matches were played on the weekend of Sunday, 14 September 2008. The draw took place on Monday, 25 August 2008 and was made by Turlough O'Connor and FAI President David Flood, and televised live on RTÉ Two.

11 September 2008
19:45 IST

Sporting Fingal	3–3	St. Patrick's Athletic
Hynes 6'; P. Byrne 18'; James 90' (pen.)	Report	Quigley 35', 42' (pen.); Dempsey 44'

Morton Stadium, Dublin
Attendance: 1,932
Referee: D. McKeon

12 September 2008
19:45 IST

Galway United	1–1	Bray Wanderers
McCulloch 45'	Report	Myler 64'

Terryland Park, Galway
Attendance: 2,234
Referee: A. Kelly

13 September 2008
19:30 IST

Cork City	1–1	Derry City
Murphy 36'	Report	Morrow 83' (pen.)

Turners Cross, Cork
Attendance: 4,258
Referee: R. Winter

14 September 2008
15:00 IST

Wayside Celtic	1–6	Bohemians
Callaghan 60'	Report	Kelly 13'; J. Byrne 19', 55' (pen.); McGuinness 52'; Fenn 77'; Crowe 81'

Carlisle Grounds, Bray
Attendance: 1,784
Referee: Ian Stokes

=== Quarter-final replays ===
16 September 2008
19:45 IST

Bray Wanderers	0–2	Galway United
	Report	Keane 37'; O'Shea 53'

Carlisle Grounds, Bray
Attendance: 1,596
Referee: A. Kelly

26 September 2008
19:45 IST

St. Patrick's Athletic	2–0	Sporting Fingal
Quigley 42'; Fitzpatrick 61'	Report

Richmond Park, Dublin
Attendance: 1,149
Referee: D. Hancock

30 September 2008
19:45 IST

Derry City	0–0 (a.e.t.)	Cork City
	Report
Penalties
	5–3

The Brandywell, Derry
Attendance: 3,275
Referee: R. Winter

== Semi-finals ==
Matches were played on the weekend of Sunday, 26 October 2008. The draw took place on Monday, 29 September 2008 and was made by John Ryan and David Flood, and televised live on RTÉ Two.

24 October 2008
19:35 IST

St. Patrick's Athletic	1–3	Bohemians
Fahey 53'	Report; Report2	Brennan 14'; Deegan 16'; Heary 42'

Richmond Park, Dublin
Attendance: 4,879
Referee: D. McKeown

26 October 2008
15:15 GMT

Galway United	0–1	Derry City
	Report; Report2	Farren 64'

Terryland Park, Galway
Attendance: 2,857
Referee: A. Kelly

== Final ==
The 2008 FAI Cup final took place on Sunday 23 November 2008 at the RDS, Dublin.

23 November 2008
15:00 UTC

Bohemians	2–2 (a.e.t.)	Derry City
Crowe 64'; J. Byrne 70' (pen.)	Report	Morrow 60', 76'
Penalties
Brennan (penalty scored); O'Donnell (penalty scored); Deegan (penalty scored); Rossiter (penalty missed); Kalonas (penalty scored)	4–2	(penalty scored) Farren; (penalty scored) McHugh; (penalty missed) Deery; (penalty missed) Higgins

RDS, Dublin
Attendance: 10,281
Referee: Anthony Buttimer
