= Reds United F.C. =

Reds United
- Full name: Reds United Football Club
- Nickname(s): Reds
- Ground: Glenmalure Park; Milltown, Dublin
- League: League of Ireland; Leinster Senior League
Home colours

Reds United Football Club was an Irish association football club, originally formed in Ringsend, Dublin. Reds United were active in the mid-1930s and played in the Leinster Senior League, the League of Ireland and the FAI Cup. The club was formed by former members of Shelbourne after the latter club was suspended from the League of Ireland at the end of the 1933–34 season.

Reds United played just one season, 1935–36, in the League of Ireland. Together with YMCA, Frankfort and Rathmines Athletic, they are one of only four clubs to have played just one season in the top level of the League of Ireland.

== History ==
=== Shelbourne / FAI dispute ===
In early 1934, Shelbourne were fined by the Football Association of Ireland for allegedly poaching players from nearby clubs. When Shelbourne refused to pay the fine they were threatened with suspension. In March 1934 Shelbourne informed the FAI by letter that they had applied for membership of the Irish Football Association. They also withdrew from the League of Ireland Shield. At the time the relationship between the two rival Irish national associations was at an all-time low. In June 1934 the FAI responded by suspending Shelbourne for one year. They also banned members of the club's management committee from managing any other club affiliated to the FAI. Shelbourne were banned from the League of Ireland and their place was awarded to Waterford.

=== Leinster Senior League ===
With Shelbourne now suspended from any footballing activity a number of former Shelbourne members and players based in Ringsend got together, formed a new club, Reds United and successfully applied to join the Leinster Senior League. In 1934–35, with a team that included John Joe Flood, Reds United finished as Leinster Senior League champions and, together with Brideville, were subsequently elected to the 1935–36 League of Ireland. Reds United also competed in the 1934–35 FAI Cup. In the first round they drew 3–3 with Bohemians but lost the replay 4–3.

=== League of Ireland ===
Reds United made their League of Ireland debut with a 2–0 win at The Mardyke against Cork. With a team that included Willie Ouchterlonie and Tommy "Netler" Doyle, an ex-Shamrock Rovers player, they finished the 1935–36 season in a respectable fourth place, behind Bohemians, Dolphin and Cork. Reds United were also quarter-finalists in the 1935–36 FAI Cup. At the end of the 1935–36 season, however, they resigned their place in the league to make way for a returning Shelbourne. Having completed their one-year ban Shelbourne, had spent the 1935–36 season playing in the Athletic Union League. With the support of Shamrock Rovers, they had also managed to successfully appeal their ban from the League of Ireland.

=== Junior club ===
There is some evidence to suggest that after leaving the League of Ireland, Reds United may have continued to function as a junior club in some capacity. Two Shamrock Rovers players active in the mid-1940s, Tommy Godwin and Ossie Nash played junior football with a Reds United.

== Home grounds ==
Reds United played their home League of Ireland games at Glenmalure Park, the home of Shamrock Rovers. However they played their home games against Rovers at Dalymount Park.

== Honours ==
- Leinster Senior League: 1
  - 1935-36

== Notable former players ==
=== Ireland internationals ===
The following Reds United players represented Ireland at full international level.

- (Republic of Ireland) John Joe Flood
- (Republic of Ireland) Tommy Godwin

=== Goalscorers ===
- (Scotland) Willie Ouchterlonie (20) – the third highest scorer in the 1935–36 League of Ireland
