= 1934–35 FAI Cup =

1935 FAI Cup
Tournament details
- Country: Ireland

Final positions
- Champions: Bohemian (2nd title)
- Runners-up: Dundalk

Tournament statistics
- Matches played: 21
- Goals scored: 70 (3.33 per match)

The FAI Cup 1934/35^{[A]} was the fourteenth edition of Ireland's premier cup competition, The Football Association of Ireland Challenge Cup or FAI Cup. The tournament began on 13 January 1935 and concluded on 14 April with the final held at Dalymount Park, Dublin. An official attendance^{[B]} of 22,000 people watched Bohemians defeat Dundalk in a high-scoring finale.

== First round ==
Tie no	Home team	Score	Away team	Date
1	Distillery	1-1	Butchers (Cork)	13 January 1935
replay	Butchers (Cork)	0-0	Distillery	16 January 1935
replay(2)	Distillery	3-0	Butchers (Cork)	23 January 1935
2	Reds United	3-3	Bohemians	19 January 1935
replay	Bohemians	4-3	Reds United	23 January 1935
3	Cork	0-0	B&I	20 January 1935
replay	Cork	3-0	B&I	23 January 1935
4	Dolphin	1-0	Bray Unknowns	20 January 1935
5	Drumcondra	3-0	Tramore Rookies	20 January 1935
6	Shamrock Rovers	0-1	Dundalk	20 January 1935
7	St James's Gate	1-1	Sligo Rovers	20 January 1935
replay	Sligo Rovers	3-1	St James's Gate	23 January 1935
8	Waterford	4-2	UCD	20 January 1935

== Second round ==
Tie no	Home team	Score	Away team	Date
1	Bohemians	5-2	Waterford	9 February 1935
2	Distillery	1-2	Dundalk	9 February 1935
3	Drumcondra	0-2	Dolphin	10 February 1935
4	Sligo Rovers	5-1	Cork	10 February 1935

== Semi-finals ==
2 March 1935

Dolphin	1–1	Bohemians
Paterson(pen)		Ellis

Dalymount Park, Dublin

24 March 1935

Dundalk	2–0	Sligo Rovers
Gaughran; O'Neill

Dalymount Park, Dublin

=== Replay ===
6 March 1935

Bohemians	2–1	Dolphin
Ellis; Farrell		Watt

Dalymount Park, Dublin

== Final ==
14 April 1935

Bohemians	4–3	Dundalk
Menton 1'; Jordan 26' 27'; Horlacher 35'		O'Neill 15'; McCourt 31'; T. Godwin 71'

Dalymount Park, Dublin
Attendance: 22,000

Winner of FAI Cup 1934–35
Bohemians
2nd Title

== Notes ==
A. From 1923 to 1936, the FAI Cup was known as the Free State Cup.

B. Attendances were calculated using gate receipts which limited their accuracy as a large proportion of people, particularly children, attended football matches in Ireland throughout the 20th century for free by a number of means.
