= 2023–24 Leinster Senior Cup =

2023-24 Leinster Senior Cup
Leinster Football Association Senior Cup

Tournament details
- Country: Republic of Ireland
- Dates: 12 August 2023 – 8 October 2024
- Teams: 30

Final positions
- Champions: St Patrick's Athletic
- Runners-up: St Mochta's

Tournament statistics
- Matches played: 41
- Goals scored: 164 (4 per match)

The 2024 PTSB Leinster Senior Cup was the 120th edition of the Leinster Football Association's primary competition. It included all Leinster based League of Ireland clubs from the Premier Division and First Division, as well as a selection of intermediate and amateur level sides. The competition began on the weekend of 12 August 2023. A new group stage was added after the third round with all League of Ireland clubs entering the competition.

== Round 1 ==
12 August 2023	Hardwicke	2–3	Evergreen	Dublin Port
				Stadium: Dublin Port Stadium

13 August 2023	New Oak Boys	3–0	Dynamo Dublin	Carlow
				Stadium: Burren Road

13 August 2023	Clara Town	4–3	Montpelier	Clara
				Stadium: Lissanisky

13 August 2023	Quay Celtic	2–1	North End United	Dundalk
				Stadium: Clancy Park

== Round 2 ==
15 September 2023	St Peter's	w/o	Clonmullion	Bray
				Stadium: Little Bray Community Centre

15 September 2023	Malahide United	3–2	Quay Celtic	Malahide
				Stadium: Gannon Park

17 September 2023	Clara Town	2–2 (a.e.t.) (5–4 p)	New Oak Boys	Clara
				Stadium: Lissanisky

17 September 2023	Gorey Rangers	8–0	Sandyhill Shangan	Gorey
				Stadium: Ramstown

17 September 2023	Evergreen	3–2	Trim Celtic	Kilkenny
				Stadium: Evergreen Park

== Round 3 ==
6 October 2023	Usher Celtic	4–3	Kilbarrack United	Islandbridge
				Stadium: War Memorial Gardens

22 October 2023	Clara Town	1–4	St. Mochta's	Clara
				Stadium: Lissanisky

22 October 2023	Evergreen	2–1	Finglas United	Kilkenny
				Stadium: Evergreen Park

26 October 2023	Maynooth University Town	3–2	Clonmullion	Maynooth
				Stadium: NUI Maynooth Astro

1 December 2023	Malahide United	2–2 (a.e.t.) (5–4 p)	Gorey Rangers	Malahide
				Stadium: Gannon Park

== Round 4 Group Stage ==
=== Group A ===
Team	Pld	W	D	L	GF	GA	GD	Pts
Drogheda United	3	3	0	0	9	4	+5	9
Dundalk	3	1	1	1	4	3	+2	4
Bohemians	3	1	1	1	2	3	–1	4
Malahide United	3	0	0	3	3	8	–5	0

=== Matchday 1 ===
21 January 2024	Malahide United	1–3	Dundalk	Malahide
	Alan O'Shaughnessy 42'		Ryan O'Kane 2'; Hayden Muller 19'; Archie Davies 61'	Stadium: Gannon Park; Referee: Owen Murphy

22 January 2024	Drogheda United	3–1	Bohemians	Drogheda
	Evan Weir 18'; Frantz Pierrot 21'; Mark O'Brien 79'		Hugh Smith 73'	Stadium: Weavers Park; Attendance: 626; Referee: Robert Harvey

=== Matchday 2 ===
28 January 2024	Malahide United	0–1	Bohemians	Malahide
			Rhys Brennan 82'	Stadium: Gannon Park; Attendance: 372; Referee: Daryl Carolan

2 February 2024	Dundalk	1–2	Drogheda United	Dundalk
	Eoin Kenny 55'		Warren Davis 66'; Warren Davis 90+3'	Stadium: Oriel Park; Attendance: 2,061; Referee: Alan Patchell

=== Matchday 3 ===
5 February 2024	Malahide United	2–4	Drogheda United	Malahide
	Karl Sheppard 55'; Gavin Murphy 74'	Report	Matthew O'Brien 14' (pen.); Killian Cailloce 56'; Bridel Bosokani 84'; Bridel Bosokani 90+2'	Stadium: Gannon Park; Referee: Daniel Murphy

5 February 2024	Dundalk	0–0	Bohemians	Dundalk
		Report		Stadium: Oriel Park; Attendance: 400 (Est.); Referee: Rob Harvey

=== Group B ===
Team	Pld	W	D	L	GF	GA	GD	Pts
Maynooth University Town	3	2	0	1	8	4	+4	6
Athlone Town	3	1	1	1	3	3	0	4
Shamrock Rovers	3	1	1	1	3	5	–2	4
Longford Town	3	1	0	2	1	3	–2	3

=== Matchday 1 ===
22 January 2024	Maynooth University Town	2–3	Athlone Town	Maynooth
	Alex Fitzgibbon 38'; Evan Murphy 68'		Dean Ebbe 61' (pen.); Dylan Gavin 80'; Shane Forbes 90+4'	Stadium: NUI Maynooth Astro; Referee: Mark Houlihan

22 January 2024	Shamrock Rovers	2–0	Longford Town	Citywest
	Matthew Britton 8'; Cian Dillon 62'	Report		Stadium: Roadstone Academy; Referee: Robert Dowling

=== Matchday 2 ===
30 January 2024	Athlone Town	0–1	Longford Town	Athlone
			Conor Crowley 44'	Stadium: Athlone Town Stadium; Referee: Declan Toland

31 January 2024	Shamrock Rovers	1–5	Maynooth University Town	Citywest
	Ryan Ritchie 68'		Callum Warfield 18'; Alex Fitzgibbon 40'; Callum Warfield 43'; Conor Delahunty 76'; Luke Scanlon 90+1'	Stadium: Roadstone Academy; Referee: Oliver Moran

=== Matchday 3 ===
5 February 2024	Maynooth University Town	1–0	Longford Town	Maynooth
	Patrick O'Sullivan 83'			Stadium: NUI Maynooth Astro; Referee: Robert Dowling

6 February 2024	Athlone Town	0–0	Shamrock Rovers	Athlone
				Stadium: Athlone Town Stadium; Referee: Marc Lynch

=== Group C ===
Team	Pld	W	D	L	GF	GA	GD	Pts
Bray Wanderers	3	2	1	0	3	0	+3	7
Evergreen	3	1	1	1	6	4	+2	4
Shelbourne	3	1	1	1	8	7	+1	4
Wexford	3	0	1	2	4	10	–6	1

=== Matchday 1 ===
8 February 2024	Wexford	4–4	Shelbourne	Carlow
	Cian Curtis 15'; Thomas Oluwa 17'; Thomas Oluwa 62'; Thomas Oluwa 84'		Cian Doyle 48'; Sean Cummins 68'; Sean Cummins 68'; Cillian Kavanagh 80'	Stadium: IT Carlow; Referee: Gavin Colfer

26 January 2024	Evergreen	0–0	Bray Wanderers	Kilkenny
				Stadium: Evergreen Park; Referee: Jason Moore

=== Matchday 2 ===
30 January 2024	Shelbourne	4–1	Evergreen	Drumcondra
	Charles McGee 27'; Daniel Bergin 45+1' (pen.); Tyreik Sammy 85'; Dylan Atanda 90+5'		Ify Nzewi 24'	Stadium: Tolka Park; Referee: Mark Houlihan

31 January 2024	Bray Wanderers	1–0	Wexford	Whitehall
	Thomas Morgan 18'	Report		Stadium: Whitehall Stadium; Referee: Gavin Colfer

=== Matchday 3 ===
3 February 2024	Evergreen	5–0	Wexford	Kilkenny
	Mikey Drennan 6'; David Grincell 10'; Ethan Phelan 12'; Dillon Lawless 18'; Mikey Drennan 26'			Stadium: Evergreen Park; Referee: Gavin Colfer

5 February 2024	Bray Wanderers	2–0	Shelbourne	Bray
	Shane Griffin 25'; Christian Magerusan 28'	Report		Stadium: Carlisle Grounds; Attendance: 600 (Est.); Referee: Rob Hennessy

=== Group D ===
Team	Pld	W	D	L	GF	GA	GD	Pts
St Mochta's	3	2	1	0	8	2	+6	7
St Patrick's Athletic	3	1	2	0	8	6	+2	5
UCD	3	1	0	2	2	6	–4	3
Usher Celtic	3	0	1	2	1	6	-5	1

=== Matchday 1 ===
20 January 2024	St Mochta's	3–0	UCD	Clonsilla
	Dean Casey 33'; Jake Donnelly 48'; Jake Donnelly 63'			Stadium: Porterstown Road; Referee: Andrew Cleary

22 January 2024	Usher Celtic	3–3	St Patrick's Athletic	Grangegorman
	Jimmy McHugh 44'; Gary Gannon 65' (pen.); Gary Gannon 75' (pen.)	Report	Chris Forrester 41'; Cian Kavanagh 46' (pen.); Mason Melia 63'	Stadium: TUD Grangegorman; Attendance: 300 (Est.); Referee: Alan Patchell

=== Matchday 2 ===
26 January 2024	UCD	1–0	Usher Celtic	Belfield
	Alex Dunne 90+1'	Report		Stadium: UCD Bowl; Attendance: 150 (Est.); Referee: Robert Dowling

3 February 2024	St Mochta's	2–2	St Patrick's Athletic	Clonsilla
	Liam Brady 30'; Gareth McCaffrey 42' (pen.)	Report	Cian Kavanagh 7'; Cian Kavanagh 24' (pen.); Arran Pettifer (red card) 41'	Stadium: Porterstown Road; Attendance: 350 (Est.); Referee: Paul Norton

=== Matchday 3 ===
3 February 2024	UCD	1–3	St Patrick's Athletic	Belfield
	Danny Norris 75'	Report	Ruairí Keating 50'; Ruairí Keating 55'; Brandon Kavanagh 89'	Stadium: UCD Bowl; Attendance: 250 (Est.); Referee: Rob Hennessy

27 February 2024	St Mochta's	3–0	Usher Celtic	Clonsilla
	Gareth McCaffrey 16'; Gareth McCaffrey 52'; Dean Casey 69'			Stadium: Porterstown Road; Referee: Daryl Carolan

== Quarter Finals ==
Six League of Ireland sides reached the Quarter Finals, joined by two Leinster Senior League outfits.

19 March 2024	Drogheda United	4–0	Athlone Town	Drogheda
	Adam Foley 1'; Adam Foley 20'; Adam Foley 30'; Emre Topçu 53'			Stadium: Weavers Park; Referee: Mark Moynihan

19 March 2024	St Mochta's	2–0	Dundalk	Clonsilla
	Dean Casey 29'; Dean Casey 33'			Stadium: Porterstown Road; Referee: Daniel Murphy

24 March 2024	Maynooth University Town	4–1	Shelbourne	Maynooth
	Cillian Duffy 48'; Patrick O'Sullivan 65'; Callum Warfield 67'; Patrick O'Sullivan 80'		Daragh Murtagh 7'	Stadium: NUI Maynooth Astro; Referee: Oliver Moran

27 May 2024	Bray Wanderers	0–3	St Patrick's Athletic	Bray
		Report	Alfie Taylor 28'; Dan McHale 72'; Jason Folarin 83'	Stadium: Carlisle Grounds; Attendance: 600 (Est.); Referee: Robert Dowling

== Semi Finals ==
Two League of Ireland sides reached the Semi Finals, joined by two Leinster Senior League outfits.

5 August 2024	St Mochta's	2–2 (a.e.t.) (5–3 p)	Drogheda United	Clonsilla
	Dean Casey 30'; Liam Brady 82'; Ciaran Grogan (red card) 78'		Jack Keaney 61'; Bridel Bosakani 77'	Stadium: Porterstown Road; Attendance: 272; Referee: Alan Patchell
	Penalties
	Conor Dunne (penalty scored); Gareth McCaffrey (penalty scored); Sean Heaney (penalty scored); Dean Casey (penalty scored); Aaron Robinson (penalty scored)		Jack Keaney (penalty scored); Killian Cailloce (penalty scored); Warren Davis (penalty missed); Andrew Quinn (penalty scored)

17 September 2024	St Patrick's Athletic	3–1	Maynooth University Town	Inchicore
	Luke Turner 4'; Michael Noonan 37' (pen.); Michael Noonan 65'	Report	Jordan Mooney 26'	Stadium: Richmond Park; Attendance: 650 (Est.); Referee: Daniel Murphy

== Final ==
8 October 2024	St Patrick's Athletic	2–1	St Mochta's	Inchicore
	Michael Noonan 25'; Kian Leavy 63'	Report	Gareth McCaffrey 90+3' (pen.)	Stadium: Richmond Park; Attendance: 1,500 (Est.); Referee: Alan Patchell
