= Willie Ouchterlonie =

Scottish footballer

Willie Ouchterlonie was a Scottish footballer who played as a striker. He was born in Dundee.

Ouchterlonie, whose brother Kinnaird was also a footballer, began his career with local side Osborne before joining Dundee United in September 1932. After scoring forty league goals in fifty-one matches, Ouchterlonie was surprisingly released in April 1934, going on to join Raith Rovers. He later played for Portadown F.C. in Northern Ireland as well as a season at Reds United in the League of Ireland before having spells with Barrow and Wrexham before a one-game return to Tannadice in January 1940 where he scored twice.

He stood 5 ft 8 1/2 in (1.74 m) tall.
