= Distillery F.C. (Dublin) =

Distillery
- Full name: Distillery Football Club
- Ground: Rutland Avenue
- League: Leinster Senior League; Athletic Union League

Distillery Football Club was an Irish association football club originally based on Distillery Road in Drumcondra, Dublin. The club was active during the 1930s and 1940s, fielding teams in both the Leinster Senior League and the Athletic Union League. They also competed in the FAI Cup, the FAI Intermediate Cup, the FAI Junior Cup and the Leinster Senior Cup, winning the three latter trophies. Despite their successes at intermediate and junior level, unlike their contemporaries Sligo Rovers and St Patrick's Athletic, Distillery never joined the League of Ireland.

== History ==
=== Intermediate success ===
Distillery first came to national prominence when they won the 1930–31 FAI Junior Cup. During the late 1930s and early 1940s they developed into the leading intermediate club team in Ireland, winning the Leinster Senior League on five occasions and the FAI Intermediate Cup four times in row between 1938–39 and 1941–42. This latter achievement remained unequalled for seventy two years until Avondale United completed a four in a row in 2013–14. In 1941–42 Distillery also won the Leinster Senior Cup after defeating Bray Unknowns 4–1 in the final. As a result, they became the first non–League of Ireland club to defeat a League of Ireland club in the final. The 1941–42 season saw the club achieve a quartet, winning the League Senior League, the Leinster Senior Cup, the FAI Intermediate Cup and the FAI Junior Cup. Tommy Eglington was a member of their 1941–42 FAI Junior Cup winning team.

=== FAI Cup ===
Distillery made their first appearance in the FAI Cup in the 1934–35. In the round of sixteen they defeated Butchers (Cork) 3–0 after two replays before losing 2–1 to Dundalk in the quarter-finals; the match had a tragic sequel as left-back Samuel Beattie died after a clash of heads. An inquest returned a verdict of accidental death, with a rider specifically exculpating the other player involved.

In 1937–38 they were FAI Cup semi-finalists. In the round of sixteen they defeated Cobh Ramblers 2–1 before knocking out their neighbours Drumcondra 4–0 in the quarter-finals. In the semi-finals they drew 2–2 with St James's Gate before losing 3–2 in a replay. Gate subsequently went on to win the cup. Distillery were quarter-finalists again in 1938–39 and 1939–40 and also played in the 1940–41, 1941–42 and 1942–43 competitions.

== Ground ==
The club played at Rutland Avenue.

== Notable former players ==
Dual Ireland internationals

- (Ireland) (Republic of Ireland) Tommy Eglington

Shamrock Rovers players

- (Republic of Ireland) Tommy Eglington
- (Republic of Ireland) Sonny Molloy
- (Republic of Ireland) Joe Ward

== Honours ==
- Leinster Senior League
  - Winners:1935–36, 1937–38, 1938–39, 1940–41, 1941–42: 5
  - Runners up: 1933–34: 1
- Leinster Senior Cup
  - Winners: 1941–42: 1
- FAI Intermediate Cup
  - Winners: 1938–39, 1939–40, 1940–41, 1941–42: 4
- FAI Junior Cup
  - Winners: 1930–31, 1941–42: 2
