= Iveagh Grounds =

Sports facility in Drimnagh / Crumlin, Dublin, Ireland

- Pneumonia Park
- Interactive map of Iveagh Grounds
- Location: Crumlin Road; Drimnagh; Dublin 12; Ireland
- Coordinates: 53°19′46.5″N 6°18′23.8″W
- Owner: Trinity College Dublin

Construction
- Built: 1920s
- Opened: 1928

Tenants
- St James's Gate F.C. (1928–present); St James Gaels GAA; St James's Gate Hockey Club; St James's Gate Bowling Club; Guinness Ladies Hockey Club; Guinness Rugby Club; Bangor Celtic F.C. (–2019); St. John Bosco F.C.; Guinness Snooker

The Iveagh Grounds is a multi-purpose sports facility based in Drimnagh, and part of the townland of Crumlin. It is the home base of several sports clubs and teams who are associated with the Guinness Athletic Union, including St James's Gate F.C. and St James Gaels GAA.

It is named after Edward Guinness, 1st Earl of Iveagh, who purchased the site and then donated it to the athletics union. Other clubs that play at the Iveagh Grounds include a field hockey club and a rugby union club. As well as St James's Gate, two other association football clubs — Bangor Celtic F.C. and St. John Bosco F.C. — have also played their home games at the Iveagh Grounds. In 2017, Trinity College Dublin purchased the grounds for €2 million.

== History ==
In 1905 John Lumsden, the chief medical officer at the St James's Gate Brewery, the home of Guinness, founded the St James's Gate Athletic and Cycling Union. This was later renamed the Guinness Athletic Union. From about 1912 Lumsden started campaigning for a permanent sports ground for the union. However, initially the Guinness board were reluctant to finance one. St James's Gate F.C. was the most prominent member of the union; however, by the early 1920s the membership had almost doubled and its activities had expanded to include tennis, cricket and handball branches. In 1926 St James's Gate Rugby Football Club was founded and 1928 saw the arrival of St James's Gate Hockey Club. This expansion highlighted the need for a permanent home base. In 1922 a twenty-five-acre site on the Crumlin Road owned by a Mr. Begg was identified as a possible candidate. Begg had been offered £5,000 by the Dolphin's Barn Brick Company but he eventually sold the site to Edward Guinness, 1st Earl of Iveagh because "he did not like the idea of having a quarry in front of his house". Iveagh subsequently donated the site to the Guinness Athletic Union (GAU) who named the grounds after him. He also established a board of trustees, that included Lumsden, and donated a further £20,000 to develop and manage the site. However the 1st Earl of Iveagh died before work on the site was completed, so the Iveagh Grounds were officially opened on 14 April 1928 by Rupert Guinness, 2nd Earl of Iveagh and his wife Gwendolen Guinness, Countess of Iveagh.

In 1930, the ground hosted an FAI Cup semi-final match between Shamrock Rovers and Fordsons.

In 2017, the sale of the Iveagh Sports Grounds to Trinity College Dublin was agreed.
