= 1935–36 League of Ireland =

League of Ireland
- Season: 1935–36
- Champions: Bohemians (5th title)
- Matches: 132
- Goals: 605 (4.58 per match)
- Top goalscorer: Jimmy Turnbull (37 goals)

The 1935–36 League of Ireland was the fifteenth season of the League of Ireland. Dolphin were the defending champions.

Bohemians won their fifth title.

== Overview ==
Two teams were elected to the League: Brideville, who returned after a three-year absence, and Reds United.

== Teams ==
Locations of the 1935–36 League of Ireland teams

Team	Location	Stadium
Bohemians	Dublin (Phibsborough)	Dalymount Park
Bray Unknowns	Bray	Carlisle Grounds
Brideville	Dublin (The Liberties)	Harold's Cross Stadium
Cork	Cork (Mardyke)	Mardyke
Dolphin	Dublin (Dolphin's Barn)	Dolphin Park
Drumcondra	Dublin (Clonturk)	Clonturk Park
Dundalk	Dundalk	Athletic Grounds
Reds United	Dublin (Milltown)	Glenmalure Park
St. James's Gate	Dublin (Crumlin)	St. James's Park
Shamrock Rovers	Dublin (Milltown)	Glenmalure Park
Sligo Rovers	Sligo	The Showgrounds
Waterford	Waterford	Kilcohan Park

== Table ==
Pos	Team	Pld	W	D	L	GF	GA	GD	Pts
1	Bohemians	22	17	2	3	73	27	+46	36
2	Dolphin	22	15	3	4	66	38	+28	33
3	Cork	22	14	3	5	61	38	+23	31
4	Reds United	22	12	1	9	45	47	−2	25
5	Waterford	22	9	5	8	58	53	+5	23
6	Shamrock Rovers	22	10	2	10	61	58	+3	22
7	Dundalk	22	9	3	10	43	39	+4	21
8	Sligo Rovers	22	9	3	10	48	47	+1	21
9	Drumcondra	22	9	2	11	45	53	−8	20
10	St James's Gate	22	8	3	11	47	42	+5	19
11	Brideville	22	4	3	15	35	64	−29	11
12	Bray Unknowns	22	1	0	21	23	99	−76	2

Source: www.rsssf.com

== Results ==
Home \ Away	BOH	BRY	BRI	CFC	DOL	DRU	DUN	RED	SHM	SLI	STG	WAT
Bohemians	—	8–2	5–0	4–1	2–3	3–0	2–0	6–1	5–2	7–0	4–1	5–3
Bray Unknowns	1–2	—	1–2	3–4	1–3	0–4	3–2	0–2	1–4	0–5	0–4	0–3
Brideville	0–2	7–0	—	0–2	4–4	3–5	2–1	2–4	2–5	1–0	3–3	1–2
Cork	1–1	4–1	4–1	—	3–3	4–0	3–1	0–2	4–2	3–3	2–1	3–0
Dolphin	1–2	4–0	6–0	2–5	—	2–1	4–1	3–1	4–0	2–1	3–2	2–2
Drumcondra	2–2	6–1	3–2	2–1	1–2	—	2–1	6–4	1–2	0–3	0–5	3–1
Dundalk	0–2	5–0	2–1	3–2	3–1	0–4	—	2–0	1–1	4–0	0–1	5–1
Reds United	2–3	5–0	2–1	2–1	1–4	4–1	1–1	—	3–2	3–2	3–2	0–2
Shamrock Rovers	3–2	9–3	3–1	2–3	1–6	1–1	5–6	1–3	—	3–5	2–0	4–1
Sligo Rovers	2–0	2–0	3–1	2–4	1–3	4–1	1–0	1–2	1–2	—	5–0	2–2
St James's Gate	0–1	5–1	1–1	2–3	2–3	1–0	2–4	4–0	0–3	5–3	—	5–0
Waterford	2–5	9–3	6–0	1–4	4–1	7–2	1–1	3–0	5–4	2–2	1–1	—

Legend: Blue = home team win; Yellow = draw; Red = away team win.

== Top goalscorers ==
Pos	Player	Club	Goals
1	Jimmy Turnbull	Cork	37

== See also ==
- 1935–36 FAI Cup
