= Maynooth Town F.C. =

Irish football club

Coordinates: 53°23′7.2″N 6°36′15.6″W

Maynooth Town
- Full name: Maynooth Town Football Club
- Founded: 1969
- Ground: Rathcoffey Road
- League: Leinster Senior League
- Website: maynoothtownfc.ie
| Home colours | Away colours |

Maynooth Town Football Club, and briefly known as Maynooth University Town F.C. from 2017 to 2022, are an Irish association football club from Maynooth, County Kildare. The club compete in the Leinster Senior League. In 2021, they reached the quarter-finals of the FAI Cup where they lost 4–0 against Bohemians.

The club was formed following a merger between Maynooth St. Mary's and Ballygoran United. After agreeing a 5-year partnership with Maynooth University, the club was known as Maynooth University Town F.C. from 2017 to 2022.

The club won the 2017–18 FAI Intermediate Cup, beating Firhouse Clover 4–1 after extra time. This qualified them for the 2018 FAI Cup, where they made it to the second round. Maynooth were relegated from the Leinster Senior 1 Sunday division at the end of the 2025–26 season.
