= Killester Donnycarney F.C. =

Irish football club

Coordinates: 53°22′32″N 6°12′04″W

- Full name: Killester Donnycarney Football Club
- Nickname: KDFC
- Founded: 2018
- Ground: Hadden Park
- Chairman: Bill Brennan
- Manager: Gary Howlett
- League: Leinster Senior League Senior Sunday Division
- Website: killesterdonnycarneyfc.com
Home colours	Away colours

Killester Donnycarney Football Club is an Irish association football (soccer) club based in Killester, Dublin. Their senior men's team currently plays in the Senior Sunday Division of the Leinster Senior League.

As Killester United, the club qualified for the FAI Cup regularly, reaching the quarter-finals of the cup in 2006 and 2015. They also won the 2006–07 FAI Junior Cup.

== History ==
The club was founded in 2018 by the merger of Killester United and Donnycarney. As Killester United, the club qualified for the FAI Cup in 2006, 2008, 2012, 2015, 2016 and 2017, reaching the quarter-finals of the cup in 2006 and 2015.

Killester Donnycarney were runners-up in the FAI Intermediate Cup in 2019–20, losing to St. Mochta's in the final. They have qualified for the FAI Cup on several occasions, reaching the last sixteen in 2021.

== Ground ==
The club's home ground is Hadden Park, located in Killester. The ground also houses a clubhouse containing a bar and lounge as well as a function room for 200 people.

== Honours ==
- FAI Intermediate Cup
  - Runners-up (1): 2019–20
- FAI Cup
  - Last sixteen (1): 2021
