= Arklow Town F.C. =

Soccer club in County Wicklow, Ireland

Arklow Town
- Full name: Arklow Town Football Club
- Founded: 1948
- Ground: Lamberton, Arklow
- Coordinates: 52.7981°N 6.1714°W
- Chairman: Bryan O'Leary (as of 2018)
- League: Leinster Senior League Senior 1A
- Website: arklowtownfc.ie
Home colours

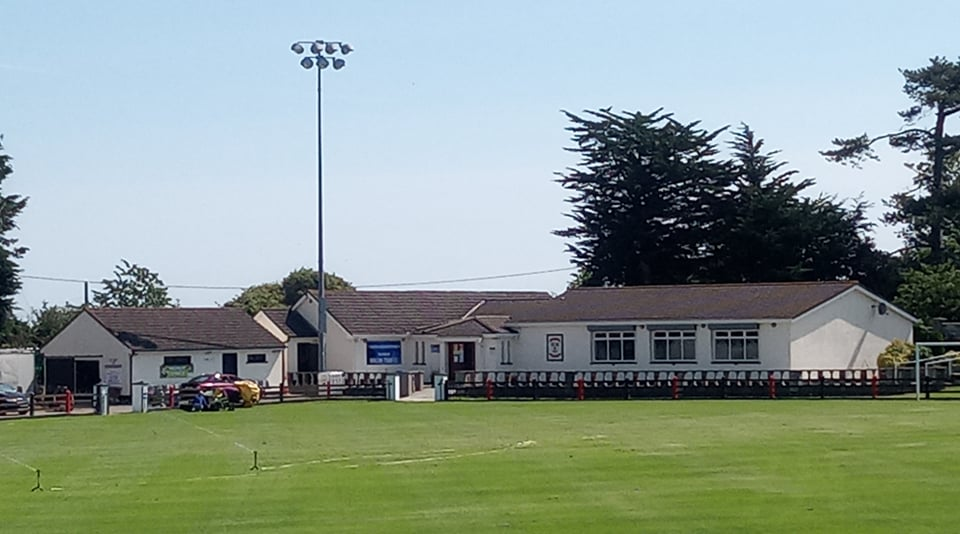
Arklow Town FC clubhouse and pitch, June 2020

Arklow Town Football Club are a football club from Arklow, County Wicklow in Ireland. The club fields a number of senior teams, including in the Leinster Senior League and the Wicklow & District Football League. The club's home ground is at Bridgewater Centre Park in Lamberton, known as "Travers Insurances Park" as of 2022 for sponsorship reasons.

== History ==
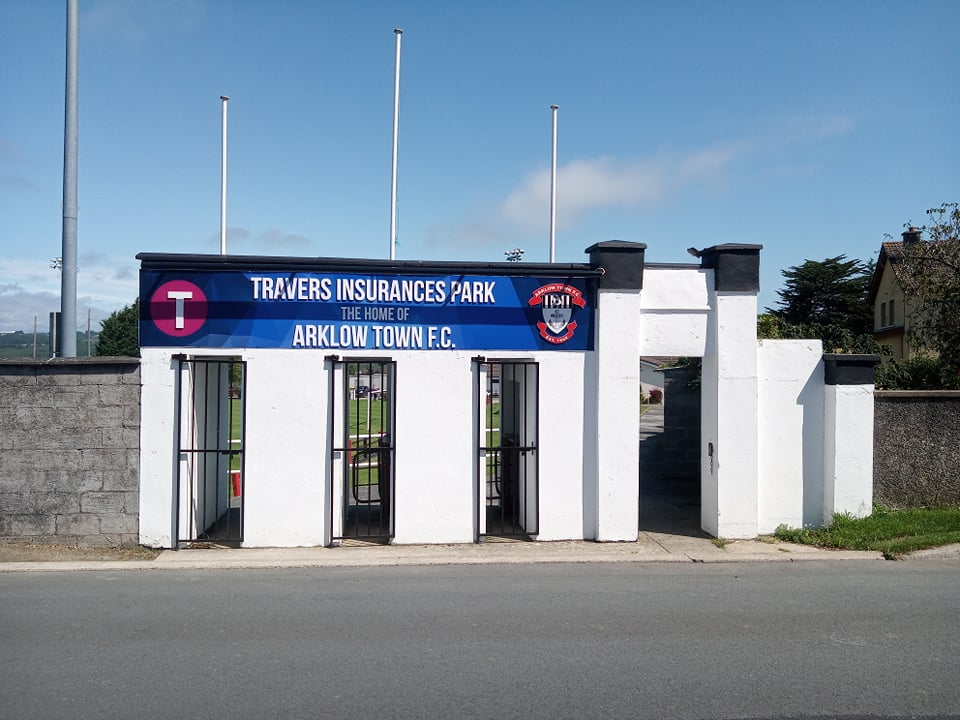
Arklow Town FC front gates, June 2020

Arklow Town Football Club was founded in late 1948 as Arklow United. At the time of their formation, there was no organised matches and the club were limited to practice games and kickabouts that initially took place in Dock Green. The team's first match came against Wicklow Town, an away game which finished in a 5–2 defeat, with both Arklow goals scored by David O'Brien. By December 1950, the club had 24 members and Arklow's first competitive game was played in September 1951, a Wicklow League game against Kilmacanogue. John Keogh scored the club's first competitive goal in the match, who had by then moved into their home ground of Lamberton. The club initially shared the venue with a camogie club and did not obtain a lease on the property until 1970. The club's grass pitch was opened in 1992 and an AstroTurf pitch was officially opened in April 2011. The club marked its 75th anniversary in 2023.

The club played in the 2009 FAI Cup, beating University College Dublin's Leinster Senior League team in the second round, before losing to the UCD first team in the third round.

In May 2010, Arklow Town won the 2009–10 Leinster Senior League Division 1 title and promotion to the Senior Division, the top division of intermediate football in Leinster.

In 2015, the club qualified for the FAI Cup.

== Notable players ==
A number of Arklow Town players have played in a professional league or at senior international level, including:

=== Internationals ===
Republic of Ireland internationals

- (Republic of Ireland) Liam Scales

=== Other ===
- Aaron Barry
- Eric Molloy
- Daire O'Connor
