= Leinster Senior Cup (association football) =

- Organiser(s): Leinster Football Association
- Founded: 1892
- Region: Leinster
- Current champions: Bray Wanderers (1st title)
- Most championships: Bohemians (33 titles)
- Website: http://www.leinsterfa.ie/
- 2026–27 Leinster Senior Cup

The Leinster Senior Cup is an association football cup competition organized by the Leinster Football Association. It is currently contested by LFA affiliated League of Ireland clubs, Leinster Senior League Senior Division clubs and invited teams from the various LFA affiliated junior leagues. Before the introduction of the FAI Cup, it was considered the major cup competition for clubs in what is now the Republic of Ireland. It is also the oldest association football cup competition in the Republic of Ireland.

== History ==
=== Early years ===
After the Leinster Football Association was founded in 1892 it began organizing its own cup competition. The Leinster Senior Cup was first played for in 1892–93. The inaugural final saw Leinster Nomads defeat Dublin University 2–1. After the inaugural win by Nomads, Bohemians and Shelbourne monopolised the cup for the next twenty-four years. For most of this era Bohemians and Shelbourne were members of the Irish Football League.

=== Olympia's Leinster Double ===
After Leinster Nomads, Bohemians and Shelbourne, Olympia became the fourth team to win the Leinster Senior Cup. In 1917–18, with team that included Jack McCarthy and Fran Watters, Olympia won both the Leinster Junior Cup and Leinster Senior Cup. In doing so they also caused one of the biggest upsets in the history of Leinster football. After winning the Leinster Junior Cup, they qualified for the Leinster Senior Cup. After receiving a bye in the first round, Olympia beat St James's Gate in the semi-final. In the final they defeated Shelbourne 1–0 with a goal scored by Fran Watters. According to Peter Byrne this also resulted in a popular giant killing chat – "Remember Olympia once beat Shels". Olympia effectively ended the Bohemians/Shelbourne monopoly and in subsequent seasons the cup was won by Leinster Senior League clubs such as St James's Gate and Dublin United.

=== Non-League of Ireland successes ===
Following the introduction of the League of Ireland in 1921–22, League of Ireland clubs have dominated the competition. However non-League of Ireland clubs, mainly from the Leinster Senior League, have enjoyed some successes. Brideville in 1924–25, Distillery in 1941–42 and St Patrick's Athletic in 1947–48 were all winners. Brideville were losing finalists in 1923–24 as were Glasnevin in 1924–25, Grangegorman in 1946–47, Transport in 1947–48, St Patrick's Athletic in 1950–51 and Longford Town in 1954–55. In the 1946–47 final Mick O'Flanagan scored six goals for Bohemians as they defeated Grangegorman 11–0. Home Farm were winners in 1964–65 after defeating Dundalk 2–1 in the final on 26 December 1964 at Dalymount Park. Home Farm, Distillery in 1941–42 and Wayside Celtic in 1998–99 are the only non-League of Ireland clubs to defeat a League of Ireland club in the final. In more recent times St Francis, Cherry Orchard and St. Patrick's C.Y.F.C. have also been finalists.

=== Decline and revival ===
The 2000–01 competition suffered with fixture rows and was eventually abandoned after the quarter-final draw was made due to the 2001 foot-and-mouth outbreak. The cup was not played again until 2010. The competition was played yearly until the COVID-19 pandemic halted sporting contests in 2020 in Ireland. The Leinster Senior cup returned for the 2022–23 season, with Bohemians winning a record 33rd title.

=== Composition ===
The Leinster Senior Cup in its current format involves three preliminary qualifying rounds, followed by a group stage phase and finally a knock-out phase.

The preliminary rounds feature a combination of junior and intermediate clubs from across the province. They are decided based on the following: the finalists from the previous season's LFA Junior Cup (2), the most recent league winner from each junior league affiliated with the Leinster FA (in the case that the league winner has already qualified through the LFA Junior Cup, the respective league is entitled to submit an alternative entrant) (6), the winners of the four Leinster Senior League Intermediate divisions (4) and the overall winner of the Leinster Senior League junior section (1)

Across three knockout rounds these thirteen sides are reduced down to five clubs, who then enter the competition's group stage. Here they join the eleven League of Ireland clubs based in Leinster (Dundalk F.C, Drogheda United, St Patrick's Athletic, Bohemian F.C., Shelbourne F.C., Shamrock Rovers, UCD AFC, Bray Wanderers, Wexford F.C., Athlone Town and Longford Town), who enter the group stages automatically. Four groups of four teams are created, before the tournament enters its quarter-final, semi-final and final stages.

== List of Leinster Senior Cup finals ==
Season	Winner	Score	Runners-up	Venue
1892–93	Leinster Nomads	2–1	Dublin University	
1893–94	Bohemians	3–0 (Note: After 2–2 draw)	Dublin University	
1894–95	Bohemians	3–1 (Note: After 1–1 draw)	Dublin University	
1895–96	Bohemians	3–1	Athlone Town	Ranelagh Grounds, Athlone
1896–97	Bohemians	3–2	Dundalk (Note: Not the current Dundalk club.)	
1897–98	Bohemians	3–1	Shelbourne	
1898–99	Bohemians	2–1	Richmond Rovers (Dublin)	
1899–1900	Shelbourne	1–0	Freebooters	
1900–01	Shelbourne	2–1	Bohemians	
1901–02	Bohemians	1–0	Tritonville	
1902–03	Bohemians	w/o	Shelbourne	
1903–04	Shelbourne	3–2	Bohemians	
1904–05	Bohemians	1–0	Shelbourne	
1905–06	Shelbourne	3–1	Royal Irish Rifles	
1906–07	Bohemians	4–0 (Note: After 0–0 draw)	Reginald (Dublin)	
1907–08	Shelbourne	3–1	Royal Berkshire Regiment	
1908–09	Shelbourne	3–1	Lancashire Fusiliers	
1909–10	Bohemians	3–0	Inniskilling Fusiliers	
1910–11	Bohemians	1–0	Shelbourne	
1911–12	Bohemians	3–0	Manchester Regiment	
1912–13	Shelbourne	4–0	Bohemians	
1913–14	Shelbourne	2–0 (Note: After two 0–0 draws)	St James's Gate	
1914–15	Bohemians	6–0	Clarence (Dublin)	
1915–16	Bohemians	3–2 (Note: After 0–0 draw)	Shelbourne	
1916–17	Shelbourne	2–0	St James's Gate	
1917–18	Olympia	1–0	Shelbourne	
1918–19	Shelbourne	3–0	St James's Gate	
1919–20	St James's Gate	2–1 (Note: After 0–0 and 1–1 draws)	Bohemians	
1920–21	Dublin United	1–0	St James's Gate	
1921–22	St James's Gate	1–0	Jacobs	
1922–23	Shamrock Rovers	3–1	Bohemians	
1923–24	Shelbourne	2–1	Brideville	
1924–25	Brideville	1–0	Glasnevin (Glasnevin)	
1925–26	Bohemians	2–1 (Note: After 2–2 draw)	Shelbourne	
1926–27	Shamrock Rovers	2–1 (Note: After 2–2 draw)	Bohemians	
1927–28	Bohemians	3–1 (Note: After 0–0 draw)	Shelbourne	
1928–29	Shamrock Rovers	1–0 (Note: After 0–0 draw)	Dundalk	
1929–30	Shamrock Rovers	2–1	Shelbourne	
1930–31	Shelbourne	1–0	Dolphin	
1931–32	Dolphin	3–0	Shelbourne	
1932–33	Shamrock Rovers	2–1	Dolphin	
1933–34	Drumcondra	3–2	Shamrock Rovers	
1934–35	St James's Gate	2–1	Dundalk	
1935–36	Drumcondra	2–0	Dundalk	
1936–37	St James's Gate	2–1	Dundalk	
1937–38	Shamrock Rovers	2–0	Brideville	
1938–39	Drumcondra	2–1	Dundalk	
1939–40	Bohemians	2–0	Shamrock Rovers	
1940–41	St James's Gate	4–2	Bohemians	
1941–42	Distillery (Dublin)	4–1	Bray Unknowns	
1942–43	Drumcondra	4–2	St James's Gate	
1943–44	Drumcondra	3–2	Shamrock Rovers	
1944–45	Drumcondra	2–1	Shelbourne	
1945–46	Shelbourne	4–0	Shamrock Rovers	
1946–47	Bohemians	11–0	Grangegorman	
1947–48	St Patrick's Athletic	3–2	Transport	
1948–49	Shelbourne	5–2	Shamrock Rovers	
1949–50	Drumcondra	4–1	Shelbourne	
1950–51	Dundalk	2–1	St Patrick's Athletic	
1951–52	Transport	3–0	Shelbourne	
1952–53	Shamrock Rovers	2–0 (Note: After 1–1 draw)	Bohemians	
1953–54	Drumcondra	3–1	St Patrick's Athletic	
1954–55	Shamrock Rovers	2–1	Longford Town	Dalymount Park
1955–56	Shamrock Rovers	3–1	St Patrick's Athletic	
1956–57	Shamrock Rovers	2–0	Drumcondra	
1957–58	Shamrock Rovers	1–0 (Note: After 1–1 draw)	Drumcondra	
1958–59	Drumcondra	5–2	Dundalk	
1959–60	Drumcondra	1–0	Transport	
1960–61	Dundalk	1–0	Drumcondra	
1961–62	Drumcondra	1–0	Dundalk	
1962–63	Shelbourne	2–1	Shamrock Rovers	
1963–64	Shamrock Rovers	3–0	St Patrick's Athletic	
1964–65	Home Farm	2–1	Dundalk	
1965–66	Bohemians	3–2	Shelbourne	
1966–67	Bohemians	1–0	Dundalk	
1967–68	Shelbourne	4–0	Drumcondra	
1968–69	Shamrock Rovers	3–0	Bohemians	
1969–70	Athlone Town	4–0	Shelbourne	
1970–71	Dundalk	5–2	Shamrock Rovers	
1971–72	Shelbourne	3–1	Bohemians	
1972–73	Bohemians	3–1	Shamrock Rovers	
1973–74	Dundalk	1–0 (Note: After 0–0 draw)	Bohemians	
1974–75	Bohemians	1–0 (Note: After 1–1 draw)	Shamrock Rovers	
1975–76	Bohemians	4–3	Athlone Town	
1976–77	Dundalk	1–0	Bohemians	
1977–78	Dundalk	1–0	Bohemians	
1978–79	Bohemians	2–1	Shamrock Rovers	
1979–80	Bohemians	2–0	Athlone Town	
1980–81	UCD	2–1	St Patrick's Athletic	
1981–82	Shamrock Rovers	2–1	Dundalk	
1982–83	St Patrick's Athletic	3–2	Drogheda United	Tolka Park
1983–84	Bohemians	1–0	UCD	
1984–85	Shamrock Rovers	2–1	UCD	
1985–86	Bohemians	1–0	Drogheda United	
1986–87	St Patrick's Athletic	1–0	Bohemians	
1987–88	Athlone Town	1–0	St Patrick's Athletic	
1988–89	Bohemians	1–0 (Note: After 1–1 draw)	Bray Wanderers	
1989–90	St Patrick's Athletic	2–0	Bray Wanderers	
1990–91	St Patrick's Athletic	1–0 (Note: After 1–1 draw)	Bohemians	
1991–92	Athlone Town	4–2 (Note: After 0–0 draw)	St Francis	
1992–93	Bohemians	1–0	Shamrock Rovers	
1993–94	Shelbourne	1–0	Dundalk	
1994–95	UCD	2–1	Dundalk	
1995–96	UCD	0–0 (Note: UCD won 5–4 on penalties)	Athlone Town	
1996–97	Shamrock Rovers	1–0	Shelbourne	
1997–98	Bohemians	1–0	Cherry Orchard	
1998–99	Wayside Celtic	2–1	Athlone Town	
1999–2000	St Patrick's Athletic	2–1	Shamrock Rovers	
2000–01	Competition abandoned	(Note: No competition between 2001 and 2009)		
2010	Shelbourne	4–0	Bray Wanderers	Carlisle Grounds
2010–11	St Patrick's Athletic	2–0	Bohemians	Dalymount Park
2011–12	Shamrock Rovers	1–0	St. Patrick's C.Y.F.C.	Tallaght Stadium
2012–13	Shamrock Rovers	1–0	St Patrick's Athletic	Richmond Park
2013–14	St Patrick's Athletic	2–1	Longford Town	City Calling Stadium
2014–15	Dundalk	3–1	Shamrock Rovers	Oriel Park
2015–16	Bohemians	4–0	Wexford Youths	Dalymount Park
2016–17	Shelbourne	4–2 (a.e.t.)	Dundalk	Oriel Park
2017–18	Shelbourne	1–1 (a.e.t.) (Note: Shelbourne won 6–5 on penalties)	St Patrick's Athletic	Tolka Park
2018–19	St Patrick's Athletic	4–0	Athlone Town	Richmond Park
2019–20	Competition abandoned	(Note: Competition abandoned due to COVID-19 pandemic from 2020-2022)		
2022–23	Bohemians	5–0	Usher Celtic	Dalymount Park
2023–24	St Patrick's Athletic	2–1	St Mochta's	Richmond Park
2024–25	Dundalk	2–1	St Patrick's Athletic	Richmond Park
2025–26	Bray Wanderers	2–1	St Patrick's Athletic	Carlisle Grounds

== Performance by club ==
Club	Winners	Runners-up
Bohemians	33	16
Shelbourne	21	15
Shamrock Rovers	19	12
Drumcondra	11	4
St Patrick's Athletic	10	10
Dundalk	9	13
St. James' Gate	5	5
Athlone Town	3	5
UCD	3	2
Bray Wanderers	1	3
Brideville	1	1
Wayside Celtic	1	0
Drogheda United	0	2
Dundalk (Note: Not the current Dundalk club.)	0	1
Longford Town	0	1
Wexford Youths	0	1
Usher Celtic	0	1
St Mochta's	0	1

== Performance by city/town ==
City/town	Winners	Runners-up
Dublin	104	66
Dundalk	9	14
Athlone	3	5
Bray	1	3
Drogheda	0	2
Longford	0	1
Wexford	0	1
