= Wayside Celtic F.C. =

- Full name: Wayside Celtic Football Club
- Founded: 1948
- Ground: Jackson Park
- Capacity: 1,000
- Chairman: Mick Mason
- Manager: Ross Zambra
- League: Leinster Senior League; Dublin & District Schoolboy League; South Dublin Football League
- Website: www.waysidecelticfc.yourclub.ie
Home colours	Away colours

Wayside Celtic F.C. is an Irish association football club based in Kilternan, Dún Laoghaire–Rathdown. They have 3 senior men's teams competing in the Leinster Senior League. They also have over 20 School Boy teams competing in the Dublin and District Schoolboys/Girls League. Since the club's formation in 1948 it has prided itself on being fully amateur.

Wayside's first team play at the highest level of amateur football in Leinster, the Senior Division, and have won the division on five occasions. The club has qualified for the FAI Cup on several occasions, reaching the quarterfinals in the 1995–96 and 2008 seasons.

== History ==
Wayside Celtic Football Club was formed in 1948 by a group of men from the Kilternan area of County Dublin. The club initially played in Stepaside before moving to Golden Ball, Kilternan. They entered the Athletic Union League (AUL), winning Division 3 South in 1953, before entering a team in the Wicklow League, which they won in 1959. After decades in Golden Ball, the club moved to their new home at Jackson Park.

The club first qualified for the FAI Cup in 1990–91, losing 0–1 to St. James's Gate in the first round. By this time, they were playing in the Senior Division, the top division of the Leinster Senior League, and finished third in the 1991–92 season. During the same season, Wayside qualified for the FAI Cup a second time and won their first match in the 1991–92 competition, beating Waterford United 1–0 away. Wayside held Monaghan United to a draw in the second round before losing the replay. The club entered the FAI Cup for the third year running in 1992–93, holding Cobh Ramblers to a scoreless draw at home before losing the away match. They also reached the final of the FAI Intermediate Cup that same season, finishing as runners‐up to Bluebell United. The 1995–96 season saw Wayside reach the quarterfinals of the FAI Cup for the first time as they overcame Cherry Orchard and Waterford United. Wayside also won their first trophy at national level when they secured the 1995–96 FAI Intermediate Cup with victory over Fanad United. Wayside won their first Senior Division title in the Leinster Senior League in 1997–98.

Wayside won the FAI Intermediate Cup for the second time in 2000–01, beating Ashtown Villa in the final. They qualified for the FAI Cup again in 2005. Wayside beat Monaghan United 1–0 in the fourth round of the 2008 FAI Cup to secure their place in the quarterfinals for the first time since 1996. Drawn at home, Wayside opted to play their quarterfinal tie at the Carlisle Grounds in Bray. They lost to eventual winners Bohemians.

After qualifying for the 2010 FAI Cup, Wayside became the first side to claim the Noel Ryan Cup in May 2010, when they beat fellow Leinster Senior League side Crumlin United 1–0 at Richmond Park. They retained the cup in 2011 and won their fifth Leinster Senior League title the same year.

== Club identity ==
The club's crest, originally designed by Billy Kelly, features a tower imagined from the remains of the Ballycorus lead mines, a landmark that can be seen from the grounds of Wayside Celtic.

== Senior teams ==
Wayside Celtic has three senior teams competing in the Leinster Senior League:

2024–2025
Team	League Position	Manager
Senior Sunday	9th	Ross Zambra
Saturday Major	7th	Dan O'Connor
Premier 1 Sunday	4th	Adam Byrne Brendan Mitchell

2023–2024
Team	League Position	Manager(s)
Senior Sunday	9th	Ross Zambra
Saturday Major	8th	Dan O'Connor
Division 3 Sunday	1st - Promotion	Adam Byrne Brendan Mitchell

== Honours ==
FAI Intermediate Cup: 3

- 1995–96, 2000–01, 2004–05

Leinster Senior League: 5

- Premier Division:
  - 1997–98, 2002–03, 2003–04, 2005–06, 2010–11
- Sunday Div 3: 2023-24

Leinster Senior Cup: 1

- 1998–99

LSL Metropolitan Cup: 2

- 2008, 2012

Leinster Junior Cup: 1

- 1989

Wicklow & District Football League: 1

- 1959

== Notable Fixtures ==
Wayside Celtic have come up against professional opposition on a number of occasions. Most often in the FAI Cup and Leinster Senior Cup.

Year	Competition	Stage	Opposition	Score
1992	FAI Cup		Waterford FC	1 - 0
1996	FAI Cup		St Patrick's Athletic	0 - 3
1997	FAI Cup		Finn Harps	2 - 1
2001	FAI Cup		St Patrick's Athletic	1 - 4
2005	FAI Cup		Cobh Ramblers	2 - 1
2005	FAI Cup		Bohemian	2 - 2
2005	FAI Cup	Replay	Bohemian	1 - 2
2008	FAI Cup		Monaghan United	1 - 0
2012	Leinster Senior Cup		Bray Wanderers FC	1 - 0
2013	Leinster Senior Cup	Semi Final	Shamrock Rovers FC	0 - 3
2024	FAI Cup	2nd Round	Wexford FC	1 - 3
2025	FAI Cup	2nd Round	Bray Wanderers FC	0 - 3
