= Jackson Park, Kilternan =

Football stadium

Jackson Park
- Location within Dublin
- Location: Kilternan, Dún Laoghaire–Rathdown, Ireland
- Coordinates: 53.24086°N 6.18669°W
- Surface: Grass
- Field size: 125 x 75 yds
- Public transit: Glenamuck Cottages (Dublin Bus route 63)

Tenant
- Wayside Celtic F.C.

Jackson Park (Irish: Páirc Uí Sheáin) is an association football stadium in the Republic of Ireland based in Kilternan, Dún Laoghaire–Rathdown. It is the home of Wayside Celtic F.C.

== See also ==
- List of association football stadiums in the Republic of Ireland
