= Mount Merrion YMCA F.C. =

Mount Merrion FC
- Full name: Mount Merrion FC
- Nicknames: (Blues); The Spice Boys (Money Men)
- Founded: 1981
- Ground: Nolan, County Dublin, Dublin
- Capacity: 300
- Coach: Harry Bilford
- League: Leinster Senior League
- 2011-12: 12th
Home colours	Away colours

Mount Merrion F.C. is an amateur association football club based in Mount Merrion, Dublin, Ireland. The club plays in the Leinster Senior League. Its training ground is in St. Benildus College in Kilmacud.Top goal scorer Dan Kilbride (422). Most Clean sheets Jonny Phillips (407). Most red cards Curtis Nolan(42). Captain (T.J Fitzsimons). Players of the season 1995 (Anto Reilly)

Mount Merrion FC, formed in 1981, initially played home matches in Marley Park. The senior team's first match was on the AFL against Quinnsworth in Marlay. Mount Merrion lost the match 1–0. Home matches later moved to football pitches at Nolan Stadium, County Dublin. The first team played its home games in Rathcoole for the 2009/10 season and on the Astro Turf surface in the Irishtown Stadium in the 2010/11 season.

== History ==
Football in the Mount Merrion area began in 1974 when a schoolboys club was formed. The club began playing football on the grounds of Mount Anville Convent.

== Location ==
Mount Merrion Youths Football Club is located within Mount Merrion, "a suburban estate in South County Dublin developed on lands once the seat of the Viscounts Fitwilliam".

Mount Merrion is south of the UCD campus, north of Stillorgan, east of Goatstown and west of the N11.

Mount Merrion Youths Football Club's Clubhouse is based in "Deerpark, a 32 acre park in the heart of Mount Merrion."

== Academy ==
Mount Merrion Youths Football Club academy goes from under 4's age group which play on Saturdays in St.Benildus College. Its runs up to Under 21's Leinster Senior League division teams with teams that compete at every age group in between.

There are over 1000 players across all teams and over 65 teams throughout the club.

Mount Merrion Youths Football Club play in the Dublin and District Schoolboys League (DDSL). Upcoming fixtures be found on the DDSL website for MMYFC teams.

Mount Merrion Youths Football Club also has senior teams that compete in Leinster Senior League competitions.

Mount Merrion Youths Football Club also have girls teams that play from under 10 age group to under 16's.

== Pitches ==
Mount Merrion Youths Football Club has over 10 pitches located between Deerpark, St. Benildus College and UCD Nova where all teams train and play.

Photo of pitch used by MMYFC in UCD NOVA

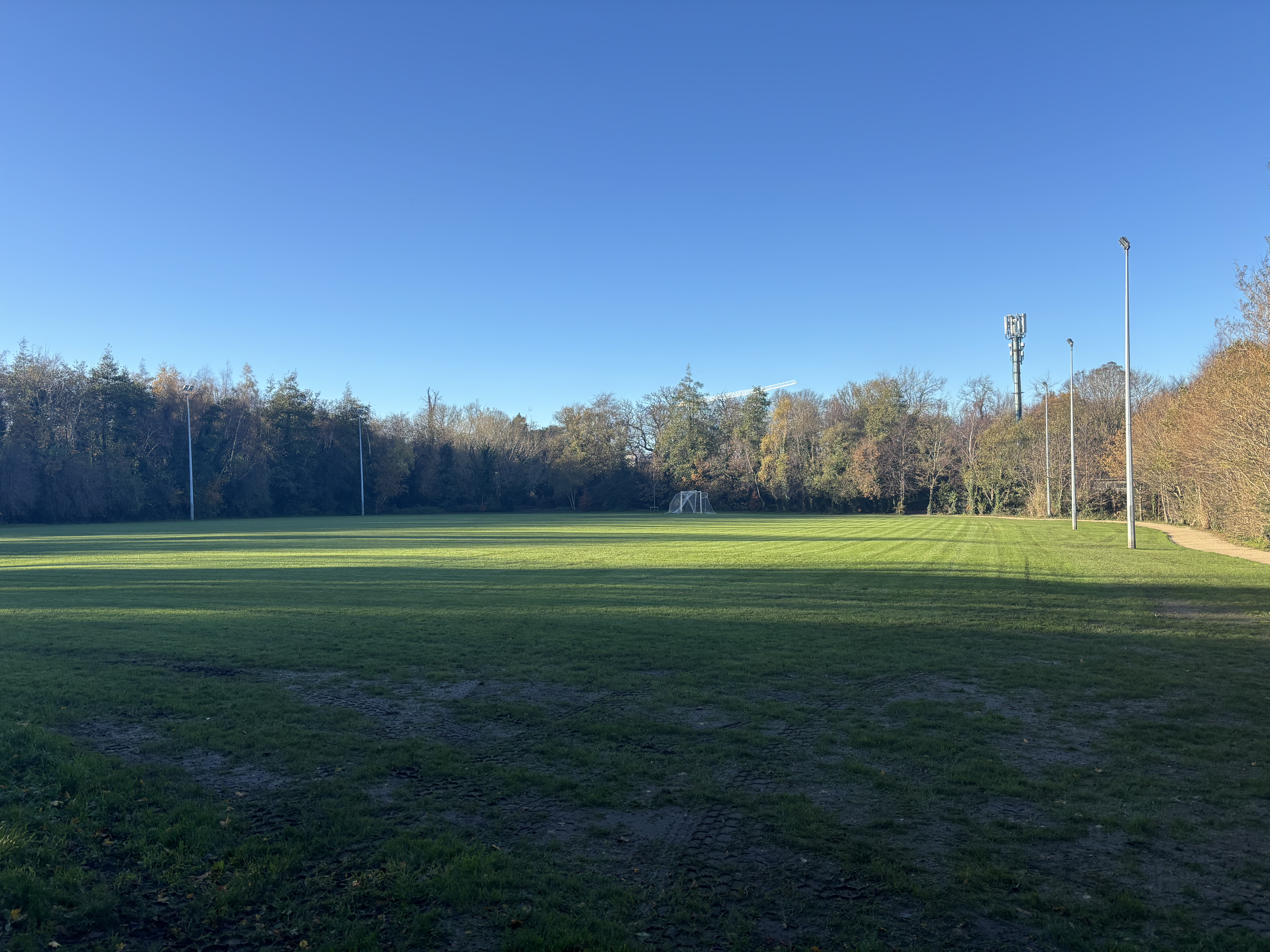

== League Of Ireland Pathway ==
Mount Merrion are linked to UCD AFC's League of Ireland setup through the under 14 and under 15 age groups. This has boosted Mount Merrion's football club by allowing academy players to progress to the next level. This leads to UCD AFC under 17 and under 20 'League of Ireland' underage competitions and then to First Team UCD League of Ireland Football. Currently UCD play in the League of Ireland First Division and finished second this year (2024) reaching the playoffs before losing 2-1 to Bray Wanderers on aggregate.

== Mini World Cup ==
The Mount Merrion Mini World Cup is hosted yearly by Mount Merrion Youths Football Club in Deerpark. It hosts age groups of under 6's up to under 12's. Its played over a week in June and is played by over 600 boys and girls and run by volunteers within the club.

== Football Gear ==
Mount Merrion Youth Football Club use 'O Neill's' as their supplier for all football gear including socks, shorts and tops. Gear can be purchased on the O Neill's website or in the shop in the clubhouse in Deerpark.
