= St. Mochta's F.C. =

Irish soccer (association football) club

Coordinates: 53°22′40.8″N 6°24′17.9″W

- Full name: St. Mochta's Football Club
- Nickname: Saints
- Founded: 1949
- Ground: Porterstown Road
- Manager: Brian McCarthy
- League: Leinster Senior League
- Website: stmochtasfc.com
Home colours

St. Mochta's F.C. is an Irish association football club based in Clonsilla, Dublin. Their senior team play in the Leinster Senior League Senior Division. They also regularly compete in the FAI Cup, the FAI Intermediate Cup, the FAI Junior Cup and the Leinster Senior Cup.

== History ==
St. Mochta's Football Club was established in September 1949, after founder Barth O'Brien suggested the formation of a club to the St. Mochta's branch of the Catholic Young Men's Society (CYMS) during their annual general meeting. O'Brien was asked to form a football section and he sought out young people to determine interest as well as the type of football the club would play, considering that it could mean association football, rugby football, or gaelic football. After a vote from aspiring members, association football, also known as soccer, was chosen.

In its early years, the club played football at Somerton on the same grounds where Castleknock GAA club now play and briefly in Coolmine Lane, close to Coolmine railway station before permanently establishing themselves at Porterstown. In the early 1960s the CYMS became defunct but the club continued on as St. Mochta's.

The club's home ground is known as Porterstown Road.

In 2007, the club qualified for that season's FAI Cup.

== Later years ==
In 2017 the club won the Leinster Senior League Senior Division for the first time. In October 2018, the Football Association of Ireland announced that St. Mochta's would be receiving €20,000 in funds to help fund a full-sized astroturf pitch at the club's Porterstown Road facility. In July 2019, the club celebrated its 70th anniversary with a glamour friendly tie against English League One side Bristol Rovers. Hailed as 'the biggest club the .... side have ever played', the match ended in a 7–0 loss for St. Mochta's. The club were runners up in the 2023–24 Leinster Senior Cup, losing 3–1 to St Patrick's Athletic at Richmond Park on 8 October 2024.

== Notable former players ==
=== Republic of Ireland internationals ===
- (Republic of Ireland) Glen Crowe
- (Republic of Ireland) Mark Kennedy

=== Republic of Ireland U21 internationals ===
- (Republic of Ireland) Stephen Paisley
- (Republic of Ireland) Darius Lipsiuc

=== Others ===
- (Republic of Ireland) Philip Hughes

== Honours ==
- Leinster Senior League Senior Division (3): 2016-17, 2022-23, 2024-25
