= Phoenix F.C. Navan Road =

Association football club in Dublin, Ireland

Phoenix F.C.
- Full name: Phoenix Football Club Navan Road
- Nickname: The Nix
- Founded: 2006
- Ground: Scribblestown, Ashtown
- League: Leinster Senior League
- Website: www.phoenixfcdublin.com
Home colours

Phoenix F.C. is a football club from Fingal in Dublin, Ireland. The club's senior men's team competes in the Leinster Senior League. Phoenix was formed after the amalgamation of Ashtown Villa and Kinvara Ards in 2006 and play at a football complex in Scribblestown. Former players at the club have included ex-Bohemian F.C. player Marc Hughes, ex-Shamrock Rovers player Marc Kenny, and Ciarán O'Donoghue.

Phoenix qualified for the FAI Cup in 2007 and 2014. As Ashtown Villa, the club made it to the quarterfinals of the competition in 1991–92.

== History ==
Phoenix Football Club Navan Road was formed on 1 June 2006 by the amalgamation of Ashtown Villa and Kinvara Ards. Kinvara Ards, who were established in 1982, had previously merged with Kinvara Boys. Ashtown Villa had been formed in 1987 through an amalgamation between Ashtown United and Villa Park Rangers.

Ashtown Villa had previously qualified for the FAI Cup several times, including three seasons in a row from 1990–91 to 1992–93. The club made it to the quarterfinals in 1990–91 after beating both Dundalk and Derry City. In the 1992–93 season, Ashtown Villa finished runners-up in the Charlie Cahill Cup and won Leinster's Metropolitan Cup. In 2000–01, Ashtown finished as runners-up to Wayside Celtic in the FAI Intermediate Cup. They went one better the following season and won the competition, beating Cherry Orchard in the 2001–02 final. The club subsequently qualified for the FAI Cup in 2002 and again in 2006.

In 2007, Phoenix F.C. — managed at the time by Harry Kenny — qualified for the FAI Cup and were drawn at home to St. Patrick's Athletic. The club later qualified for the 2014 FAI Cup. Phoenix's senior men's team played in the Athletic Union League up until 7 June 2024, with their final league game coming against Hardwicke F.C. The team then switched to the Leinster Senior League, playing their first game in the league's Premier Sunday division against Kilcock Celtic on 27 August 2024.

The committee of Ashtown Villa FC had a vision to bring in schoolboy football to the community based on one club operating in Scribblestown at the all-weather facilities which is complemented with two grass pitches and a modern club house.

Phoenix's original home ground was at the Belvedere complex on the Navan Road but, by 2007, they had begun developing a new ground at Scribblestown. The club's playing facilities at Scribblestown Lane consist of two floodlit, artificial turf pitches (one full-size, one 5-a-side), one 7-a-side grass pitch and one 9-a-side grass pitch.

Phoenix also retains their original clubhouse from the 1960s in Martin Savage Park. Dublin City Council provides the club with the use of two full-size grass pitches and one 7-a-side pitch at the same location.

== Honours ==
Ashtown Villa

- FAI Intermediate Cup
  - Winners: 2001–02
  - Runners-up: 2000–01
- LFA Metropolitan Cup
  - Winners: 1992–93

Kinvara Boys

- FAI Junior Cup
  - Winners: 1992–93
