= Bangor Celtic F.C. =

- Full name: Bangor Celtic Football Club
- Nickname: The Celts
- Short name: Bangor
- Founded: 1987
- Ground: The Transport Club
- Chairman: Gerry Carney
- Coach: John Scott
- League: Leinster Senior League Senior Division
- 2012–13: 3rd
Home colours

Bangor Celtic Football Club are an Irish association football club based in Crumlin, Dublin. They play in the Senior Division of the Leinster Senior League.

== History ==
Bangor Celtic were founded in 1987 as a breakaway club from Cashel Villa. They were originally located on Whitehall Road, at the playing field of Good Shepherd School in Rathfarnham. The club first entered the FAI Cup in the 1998–99 season and played their inaugural game in the competition on 10 January 1999. The following season they won their first FAI Cup match, beating Ballymun United away from home. Bangor followed this up with a giant killing by beating League of Ireland Premier Division side Drogheda United away in the second round of the cup. They were eventually knocked out of the competition by Shelbourne, losing 2–3 at home.

By the 21st century, the club were playing their Leinster Senior League games at the Iveagh Grounds in Drimnagh. They won their first Leinster Senior League Senior Division league title in 2005 and their second in 2009. In 2006, they qualified for the FAI Cup, making it to the second round. They also reached the 2006–07 final of the FAI Intermediate Cup but lost to Avondale United. In 2019, Bangor Celtic merged with Greenhills/Greenpark F.C. and left the Iveagh Grounds to move to Greenhills Park in Greenhills.

In 2022, Bangor again qualified for the FAI Cup. They faced Shamrock Rovers and lost 4-0.

Bangor Celtic have been used as a feeder club to League of Ireland Premier Division side Bohemians.

== Merger ==
In July 2019, Bangor Celtic merged with nearby Dublin 12 club Greenhills/Greenpark F.C. The newly merged club was renamed Bangor Greenhills/Greenpark F.C. (Bangor GG F.C. for short), provided with a new club crest, and continued to play in the Leinster Senior League.

The new club decided not to remain at Bangor Celtic's previous base in the Iveagh Grounds and instead moved to Greenhills/Greenpark's ground, Greenhills Park, to demonstrate their commitment to the merger. Greenhills/Greenpark F.C. had itself been the result of a merger, having amalgamated in 2010. The Greenhills/Greenpark youth section of the club, established in 1967 and known as Greenhills Boys A.F.C., was kept separate from the merger.

The merger followed a trend of smaller Dublin football clubs merging to concentrate talent and expand their potential sponsorship pool, in order to better challenge larger junior clubs like Crumlin United and Cherry Orchard. Bangor Celtic's previous sponsors remained on board after the merger.

In 2022, the club returned to its former name of Bangor Celtic F.C. and restored its previous club crest to reflect the change. Greenhills/Greenpark F.C. did likewise.

== Grounds ==
As of June 2025, the club play their Sunday games at the Transport Club, home of fellow Leinster Senior League team Transport F.C., and host their Saturday matches in Beechfield Park, Walkinstown. They have also played at Pearse Park in Crumlin for FAI Cup games.

As of July 2015, the club still use the Good Shepherd School pitch in Rathfarnham for friendlies.

== Notable former players ==
Republic of Ireland U21 internationals

- (Republic of Ireland) Danny Grant

== Honours ==
- Leinster Senior League: 2
  - 2004–05, 2008–09
