= Malahide United F.C. =

Coordinates: 53°26′33.8″N 6°7′38.7″W

Malahide United
- Full name: Malahide United Football Club
- Founded: 1944; 82 years ago (founded); 1970; 56 years ago (reformed)
- Ground: Gannon Park
- League: Leinster Senior League
- Website: malahideunited.ie
Home colours

Malahide United F.C. are a football club from Malahide, Fingal county in Ireland. The club plays at Gannon Park. Malahide compete in the Leinster Senior League.

With over 1,200 registered players as of 2009, the club claims to be one of the largest in Ireland.

== History ==
Malahide United A.F.C. was established in 1944. The club applied to join the Athletic Union League (AUL) in Dublin and became a registered participant by the time the league kicked off in September 1944. Malahide's first pitch was based in Ard Na Mara and the official club colours were originally red and white. The team's first competitive match was against Bray Wanderers which ended in a 9–0 defeat. Malahide won the reverse fixture, beating Bray 5–3 in the final game of the season and denying the Seagulls the title.

In 1951, the club moved to Yellow Walls Road and gained promotion to the AUL second division. Local interest in soccer increased and a second team was established.

The club disbanded in the early 1960s due to insufficient numbers, although by 1969 discussions were held to resurrect the club. This culminated in an application to the Amateur League and the club reformed in 1970. Following the reformation, the club colours were changed to red and black and a new club crest was designed. This new crest was inspired by the crest of Real Madrid.

During the shortened tournament season in 2002, Malahide United reached the second round of the FAI Cup. The club reached the last sixteen of the 2014 FAI Cup. On 31 March 2019, Malahide won the Charlie Cahill Cup, beating Crumlin United 5–4 on penalties. The final was played at Whitehall Stadium and, with no goals in normal time, both sides scored in extra time to bring the game to penalties. In April, Malahide travelled to the Mardyke in Cork for their 2019 FAI Cup qualifying round match against UCC. Malahide won the game 0–2 to progress to the first round of the competition.

In 2022, Malahide United reached the second round of the FAI Cup, losing to Waterford F.C.

== Colours ==
The club's colours were originally red and white but were changed to red with black stripes after the club reformed. The team kit has since been red and black striped shirts, black shorts and black socks. The away kit has: all white shirts, white shorts and white socks.

== Ground ==
The club plays their home games at Gannon Park.

== Former players ==
Republic of Ireland internationals

- (Republic of Ireland) Conor Sammon
- (Republic of Ireland) Jack Moylan

Other internationals

- (Democratic Republic of the Congo) Peter Kioso

Republic of Ireland U21 internationals

- (Republic of Ireland) Lee Desmond
- (Republic of Ireland) Rene Gilmartin
- (Republic of Ireland) Zack Elbouzedi
- (Republic of Ireland) Conor Grant
- (Republic of Ireland) Oisin McEntee
