= Tolka Rovers F.C. =

Football club in Dublin, Ireland

Coordinates: 53°22′43.7″N 6°16′24.3″W

Tolka Rovers
- Full name: Tolka Rovers Football Club
- Founded: 1922
- Ground: Frank Cooke Park
- League: Leinster Senior League
- 2011–12: 4th
Home colours

Tolka Rovers F.C. is an amateur Irish football club based in Glasnevin, Dublin. They play in the Leinster Senior League. They play at Frank Cooke Park and wear red shirts with white sleeves. The club's junior teams play at Johnstown Park.

== History ==
The club was founded in 1922 and had a social hall in Finglas Bridge. It continued into the mid-1930s and reformed in the 1940s. During that period, the club played in 'Doyle's Field', now known as West Park. Tolka Rovers then moved to Clonmell Park, in the Ballymun area of Dublin in 1945. In 1946 the club had moved once again to Blanchardstown after which it had the use of the fields in Finglas with the consent of the County Council. However, Rovers were moved from place to place due to housing development and were unable to establish a permanent home. On the November 19, 1958, the club's board signed a lease with Dublin Corporation for a soccer pitch. Due to financial constraints, they were only able to acquire an 11-month lease at the time, and the board were advised that perhaps we would have a better chance of becoming long-term tenants in Ballygall Road East. The club's board made an application to the Dublin Board of Assistance and duly met the engineer. It was agreed that Tolka Rovers submit a plan of their requirements for a ground and they did so on June 24, 1960. In 1963 after lengthy negotiations, the club was informed that the site in question had been allocated planning permission for apartments.

Once again, Rovers applied to Dublin Corporation for a long-term lease of the pitch in Finglas East, pointing out that they had now spent hundreds of pounds in rent and rates. Unfortunately for the club, there was no hope of accepting the terms offered. They continued to play in Finglas East. Crippled by the costs of the lease, the club was forced to adopt a pragmatic approach and innovatively used nearby residential houses as dressing rooms with permission from the owner.

The club returned to Johnstown Park in 1971. In the meantime, the board were renewing their application for the club premises. They had meetings over the years with Dublin Corporation and were pleased when in December 1974, they were finally granted a site in Fitzmaurice Road. The board knew the time was right for redevelopment and began to set about creating ambitious plans for the club in conjunction with meetings with their architect. They submitted the plans, but eventually had to withdraw them in 1975 due to planning restrictions which would have left the club with very little space for future redevelopment. They continued for a further four years to pursue the ambition of constructing a new complex and on the March 20, 1979 they were given title to the present site. Work then commenced and on the March 10, 1980, the Frank Cooke sports complex was completed.

The complex was official opened on the July 18, 1982 by Jim Tunney, Leas Ceann Comhairle of Dáil Éireann, for a match against League of Ireland side Bohemians. The club has competed regularly since then in the Leinster Senior League and pending their performance in this league, enters the FAI Cup at the early stages. On June 15 2007, Tolka Rovers claimed a famous 2–2 draw in the 2007 FAI Cup Second Round against League of Ireland Premier Division team Waterford United.

== Honours ==
- FAI Junior Cup
  - Winners: 1972–73, 1988–89: 2
  - Runners Up: 1969–70, 1973–74: 2
- FAI Youth Cup
  - Winners: 1986–87, 2002–03: 2
