= Crumlin United F.C. =

Coordinates: 53°19′26.7″N 6°18′50.2″W

Crumlin United
- Nickname: Crumlin Boys
- Founded: 1967
- Ground: Pearse Park; Windmill Road; Crumlin; Dublin 12
- Chairman: Martin Loughran
- Manager: Paddy Kelly
- League: Leinster Senior League Senior Division
- 2013–14: 1st (champions)
- Website: http://www.crumlin-united.ie
Home colours

Crumlin United Football Club is an Irish association football club based in Crumlin, Dublin. Founded in 1967, the club is one of the biggest producers of football talent in Ireland. They are linked with Nottingham Forest. Their main rival is Cherry Orchard. The club currently has teams in the Dublin District Schoolboys League and Leinster Senior League. The club is managed by Martin Loughran, who is also on the Leinster Senior League committee.

The club qualified for the 2009 FAI Cup, reaching the last sixteen.

== FIFA registration case ==
The club successfully initiated a landmark appeal to FIFA in February 2004 in order to receive compensation for the development of Robbie Keane as a schoolboy. The case, though supported by the FAI, was opposed by the FA, the Premier League and the Football League. The compensation of €126,000 by Tottenham Hotspur enabled a new all-weather floodlit pitch to be constructed.

== Leinster Senior League champions ==
In 2007–08 Crumlin United won the Leinster Senior League Senior Division title for the first time. They have since won the same league a further four times in recent seasons. In 2008–09 they also won a league and cup double when they won the FAI Intermediate Cup after a 3–2 win over Bluebell United in the final. This victory was also their first win in this competition. In 2010, the club won the quadruple of the Leinster Senior League, Cahill Cup, Metro Cup and FAI Intermediate Cup.

== Grounds ==
Pearse Park is the home ground of Crumlin United. The ground hosted the 2015 FAI Youth Cup final between Bohemian F.C. and Kilreen Celtic.

In July 2025, the ground hosted an FAI Cup second round match between Bangor Celtic and Cobh Ramblers.

== Honours ==
- Leinster Senior Division: 6
  - 2007–08, 2009–10, 2011–12, 2012–13, 2013–14, 2018–19
- FAI Intermediate Cup: 4
  - 2008–09, 2009–10, 2014–15, 2015–16
- LSL Metropolitan Cup: 3
  - 2004–05, 2009–10, 2018–19
- LSL Charlie Cahill Cup: 4
  - 2004–05, 2005–06, 2009–10, 2014–15

== See also ==
- Category:Crumlin United F.C. players
