= Collingwood Cup =

All-Ireland football tournament

- Organiser(s): Irish Universities Football Union
- Founded: 1914
- Region: Republic of Ireland; Northern Ireland
- Teams: 11
- Current champions: (Republic of Ireland) Maynooth University (4th title)
- Most championships: UCD (49)
- Website: http://www.thirdlevelfootball.ie
- 2018

The Collingwood Cup is an association football cup competition featuring university teams from the Republic of Ireland and Northern Ireland. It is organised by the Irish Universities Football Union, and is the oldest surviving all Ireland association football competition. University College Dublin were the inaugural winners, and later became the cup's most successful team. The competition has been played almost annually since 1914, taking a break during the First World War/Irish War of Independence era and again in 1932 and 1933 due to a dispute between the Irish Football Association and the Football Association of Ireland. In 2014 the Collingwood Cup celebrated its centenary with a dinner that featured Martin O'Neill as a guest speaker. The 2014 final was broadcast live on Setanta Sports and the tournament was sponsored by Eircom.

In 2017, Rustlers became the title sponsor of all Third Level Football Competitions in Ireland including the Collingwood Cup. The 2018 final was live streamed by the Football Association of Ireland; highlights appeared on Eir Sport and on NVTV.

== Regular participants ==
The Collingwood Cup features several clubs/teams that play in leagues and divisions within the Republic of Ireland and Northern Ireland football league systems. The remaining teams play in the College & Universities Football League organised by the Irish Universities Football Union and Colleges Football Association of Ireland.

| Team | League |
|---|---|
| University College Dublin A.F.C. | League of Ireland First Division |
| Queen's University Belfast A.F.C. | NIFL Championship |
| University College Cork A.F.C. | Munster Senior League Senior Premier Division |
| NUI Galway F.C. | Galway & District League |
| Ulster University at Jordanstown Football Club | Northern Amateur Football League |
| Dublin University A.F.C. ^{[Note 1]} | Leinster Senior League |
| Maynooth University | College & Universities Football League |
| Dublin City University | College & Universities Football League |
| Royal College of Surgeons in Ireland | College & Universities Football League |
| Mary Immaculate College, Limerick | College & Universities Football League |
| University of Limerick | College & Universities Football League |

Notes

- ^1 Sports teams that represent Trinity College Dublin are traditionally referred to as Dublin University.

== Format ==
Historically the Collingwood Cup has been played as a straight knockout competition. It is currently played over one week in February, with all games hosted by one of the universities. However, in the past it has also been played using a group stage format. In 1971 the Collingwood Plate was introduced as a consolation tournament for teams knocked out in the early stages. In 2006, when the competition reverted to a straight knockout format, the Plate was replaced with three consolation cups. The Duggan Cup and the Spillane Cup each feature teams knocked out in the first round, while the Farquhar Cup, named after Anthony Farquhar, features the defeated quarter-finalists.

In 2017, it was decided to play the first round of the 2018 competition in a week alternative to the quarter-finals and onwards. It was also decided that the Farquhar Cup would be the sole subsidiary of the Collingwood Cup, with the Spillane Cup becoming the alternative to the Harding Cup for Fresher students, and the Duggan Cup associated with the Crowley Cup.

== History ==
=== Bertram Collingwood ===
Bertram J. Collingwood (1871–1936), a nephew of Lewis Carroll, was appointed professor of physiology and histology at University College Dublin in 1912. Collingwood, an Oxford graduate, was also a keen amateur footballer. He represented New College, Oxford and later played as a right half for Corinthians. Partly inspired by the recently inaugurated Sigerson and Fitzgibbon Cups, similar competitions for Gaelic football and hurling, Collingwood donated a trophy for an intervarsity association football competition.

=== Early years ===
Four teams – University College Dublin, Queen's University Belfast, Dublin University and University College Galway – entered the first Collingwood Cup tournament which was hosted by UCD in February 1914. In the semi-finals played at Prospect Park in Glasnevin, UCD beat Dublin University 5–2 and QUB beat UCG 3–1. The final of the first tournament was played at Dalymount Park and it ended in a victory for UCD over QUB by 2–1. Due to the First World War and Irish War of Independence, it was not until 1920 that the second Collingwood Cup tournament was played. This competition began in Dublin, with UCD defeating Dublin University 8–1 in a match played in Terenure. Both teams then travelled to Belfast to play QUB who eventually emerged as the second winners of the Collingwood Cup. Between 1920 and 1967 UCD and QUB established themselves as the two strongest teams in the competition, winning nearly every tournament between them.

=== UCD/QUB monopoly ===
UCD and QUB dominated the Collingwood Cup between 1943 and 1966. In the mid-1940s University College Galway rejoined the competition and University College Cork made their debut in 1954. In 1955 UCG – with a team featuring nine players from County Galway – caused a major shock by beating UCD in the final. However UCD and QUB quickly reasserted control and they shared all victories between them until Dublin University broke their run with a their win in 1967. From then until 1985, UCD and QUB won the competition more times than anyone else, but the cup was more widely shared than previously. Between 1950 and 1954 UCD won the Collingwood Cup five times in a row. With teams that included Willie Browne and his two brothers, Harold and Raymond, UCD added further titles in 1956 ?, 1958 and 1959. In 1976 Kevin Moran was a member the UCD winning team and

=== UCG / NUI Galway ===
Having played in the inaugural tournament in 1914, University College Galway rejoined the competition in the mid-1940s. In 1955, with a team featuring nine players from County Galway, UCG caused a major shock when they defeated UCD in the final. UCG were winners again three times in four years between 1968 and 1971.

=== Dublin University ===
In 1947 and 1949 Dublin University shared the Collingwood Cup with QUB and UCD respectively. However the club would have to wait until 1967 before it won the Collingwood Cup outright for the first time. In the final at College Park they defeated QUB 1–0 with a penalty scored five minutes from the end. In 1979 with a team featuring Hugo MacNeill and coached by Liam Tuohy, Dublin University won the Collingwood Cup outright for a second time. MacNeill scored twice in the final as Dublin University defeated Maynooth University 2–0.

=== UCC successes ===
University College Cork made their debut in 1954. UCC won the competition for the first time in 1974, a feat they repeated in 1978. However subsequently they only enjoyed sporadic successes. Then during the 1990s they won it twice in a row – 1990 and 1991. However, in the 2000s and the 2010s, UCC have emerged as the most regular challengers to UCD's traditional dominance. UCC were winners again in 2000 and then between 2002 and 2005 they retained it four times in a row. In 2011, with a team featuring Josh O'Shea and Michael McSweeney and managed by John Caulfield, UCC won the Collingwood Cup again. O'Shea, McSweeney and Caulfield all subsequently joined Cork City F.C.. In 2015 UCC A.F.C. enjoyed one of its most successful intervarsity seasons. In addition to winning the senior Collingwood Cup, they also won the Crowley Cup, the reserve team competition, and the Harding Cup, featuring teams made up of freshers or first year students. In February 2015 UCC won the Collingwood Cup. In the quarter-finals they defeated defending champions Maynooth University, managed by Ger O'Brien, 7–6 on penalties. In the semi-final they defeated NUI Galway 1–0. The final, which was played at Eamon Deacy Park on 26 February, saw UCC defeat Dublin University 3–1. In March UCC completed an Intervarsity treble when they also won the Crowley Cup.

=== UUJ ===
Since 1980 Ulster University at Jordanstown have replaced QUB as the main challengers from Northern Ireland. In 1979, when they were still known as Ulster Polytechnic, UUJ won their first senior trophy when they won the Collingwood Plate. In 1980, when the Collingwood Cup was held in Belfast as part of the Irish Football Association's centenary celebrations, Ulster Polytechnic won the tournament for the first time. In the final, played in Jordanstown, they defeated UCG 3–1. Ulster Polytechnic were finalists again in 1987 but lost to QUB. UUJ had a particularly good run in the cup during the 1990s. They were runners–up in 1992, 1994 and 1995, before going on to win the cup twice in a row in 1996 and 1997. In 2001 UUJ won the Collingwood Cup for a fourth time and in 2006 they defeated the hosts, UCC, in the final on penalties. UUJ won the cup for a sixth time in 2008 after defeating the University of Limerick 2–1 in the final.

The 2015 tournament saw UUJ involved in a controversy. On Sunday, 22 February 2015, UUJ were due to play UCD in the first round of the Collingwood Cup. However, on Friday, 19 February, just two days earlier, the Irish Universities Football Union barred them from the competition. UUJ were banned because they planned to field players from Magee College in the team. Ulster University initially wanted to enter a single team featuring players from three of their campuses – Coleraine, Jordanstown and Magee. However, Coleraine opposed this idea and entered the tournament under their own name. Meanwhile, UU decided to enter the tournament as UUJ, while Magee opted not to enter the competition. With the Magee club not involved, UU decided to enter a joint team that included players from both Jordanstown and Magee. However, they were informed by the IUFU that it was against Collingwood Cup rules to select players from more than one campus. As UU refused to comply with the IUFU requests and enter a team that only consisted of players from the Jordanstown campus, the IUFU decided to expel them from the competition. Meanwhile, the team representing Coleraine competed in the tournament, however according to club officials, they did not receive any funding from Ulster University, who do not recognise them as an official university team.

=== Maynooth win ===
In 2014, as part of a scholarship scheme between St Patrick's Athletic and Maynooth University, five St Pat's players – Seán Hoare, Daniel Campbell, Conor Mahoney, Stephen Dunne and Jake Corrigan – were "loaned" to Maynooth. In addition St Pat's captain, Ger O'Brien, and their goalkeeper, Brendan Clarke, managed and coached the team during their Collingwood Cup campaign. As part of their preparations for the tournament, Maynooth played St Pat's first team in a friendly. Seán Hoare captained the Maynooth team and scored the winner as they knocked out the tournament favourites, UCD, in the quarter-final by a 2–1 scoreline. After knocking out UCC in the semi-final, Maynooth faced NUI Galway in the final at the UCD Bowl. This match was broadcast live on Setanta Sports. Maynooth subsequently won 2–1, winning their first ever Collingwood Cup. Seán Hoare was named Player of the Tournament after the game.

== Trophy ==
During the 1930s no trophy or cup was awarded to the winners, as the original cup that Bertram Collingwood had donated had disappeared towards the end of the 1920s. One legend claims that it was thrown into the River Boyne by a QUB team who were travelling south for a tournament they had no chance of winning. They had vowed that the trophy would never return south. Another legend claims that a landlady accepted the cup from a UCD captain in lieu of rent due to her. A new cup was donated in 1940 and was immediately named the Collingwood Cup. This cup remains in use today. The cup disappeared again in 1972 but turned up after three months in a Dublin hotel.

== List of winners by year ==
| Year | Winner | Score | Runners-up | Final venue |
|---|---|---|---|---|
| 2026 | Maynooth University | 2–0 | UL | UL |
| 2025 | Maynooth University | 1–0 | NUI Galway | The Mardyke |
| 2024 | UL | 5–0 | Dublin University | Galway |
| 2023 | UCD | 3–2 | UL | Jordanstown |
| 2022 | UCD | 2–1 | QUB | Oriel Park |
| 2021 | Maynooth University | 1–0 | UCC | The Mardyke |
| 2020 | DCU | 4–1 | UUJ | Dalymount Park |
| 2019 | UCC | 2–1 | UL | Markets Field |
| 2018 | UCD | 2–1 | QUB | The Dub, QUB |
| 2017 | UCC | 2–1 | UCD | Maynooth University |
| 2016 | UCD | 2–1 | University of Limerick | The Mardyke |
| 2015 | UCC | 3–1 | Dublin University | Eamonn Deacy Park |
| 2014 | Maynooth University | 2–1 | NUI Galway | UCD Bowl |
| 2013 | UCD | 1–0 | UCC | Jordanstown |
| 2012 | UCD | 1–0 | Mary Immaculate College | The Bowl, UL |
| 2011 | UCC | 1–0 ^{[Note 8]} | NUI Galway | College Park, Dublin |
| 2010 | UCD | 0–0 ^{[Note 11]} | NUI Galway | Brandywell Stadium |
| 2009 | UCD | 1–0 | NUI Galway | The Mardyke |
| 2008 | UUJ | 2–1 | University of Limerick | Terryland Park |
| 2007 | UCD | 2–0 | UU Coleraine | |
| 2006 | UUJ | 1–1 (4-2 pens) | UU Coleraine | Cork |
| 2005 | UCC | 3–0 | UCD | The Bowl, UL |
| 2004 | UCC | | | |
| 2003 | UCC | | | |
| 2002 | UCC | 0–0 (7–6 Pens) | Dublin University | Terryland Park |
| 2001 | UUJ | | | |
| 2000 | UCC | 1–0 | Magee College | Stark Park Coleraine |
| 1999 | NUI Galway | 5–0 | UUJ | Limerick |
| 1998 | St. Mary's | 3–1 | University of Limerick | Solitude |
| 1997 | UUJ | ^{[Note 9]} | UCC | Cork |
| 1996 | UUJ | 2–1 | Dublin University | Galway |
| 1995 | UCG | 3–2 | QUB | UCD Dublin |
| 1994 | UCD | 2–1 | UUJ | Coleraine |
| 1993 | UCD | 2–0 | Ulster University(UUJ) | UL Limerick |
| 1992 | UCD | 5–4 | Ulster University | Trinity |
| 1991 | UCC | 2–1 | UCD | |
| 1990 | UCC | 2–1 ^{[Note 8]} | Dublin University | The Mardyke |
| 1989 | UCD | 4–0 | Thomond College | |
| 1988 | UCD | | Thomond College | |
| 1987 | UCD | 1–0 | UUJ | Limerick |
| 1986 | UCC | 2–1 | UCD | Shaw's Bridge, Belfast |
| 1985 | QUB | | UCC | Mardyke, Cork |
| 1984 | UCD | | | |
| 1983 | UCD | 1–0 | Thomond College | |
| 1982 | QUB | | Ulster Polytechnic | Coleraine |
| 1981 | UCD | | | |
| 1980 | Ulster Polytechnic | 3–1 | UCG | Jordanstown |
| 1979 | Dublin University | 2–0 | Maynooth University | |
| 1977–78 | UCC^{[Note 7]} | | | |
| 1977 | QUB | | | |
| 1975–76 | UCD^{[Note 6]} | | | |
| 1975 | QUB | | | |
| 1974 | UCC | | | |
| 1973 | UCD | | | |
| 1972 | UCD | | | |
| 1971 | UCG | | | |
| 1970 | UCG | 1–0 | Dublin University | Fahy's Field |
| 1969 | UCD | | | |
| 1968 | UCG | | | |
| 1967 | Dublin University | 1–0 | QUB | College Park, Dublin |
| 1966 | QUB | | | |
| 1965 | QUB | | | |
| 1964 | QUB | | | |
| 1963 | QUB | | | |
| 1962 | QUB | | | |
| 1961 | UCD | | | |
| 1960 | QUB | | | |
| 1959 | UCD | | UCG | |
| 1958 | UCD | | | |
| 1957 | QUB | | | |
| 1956 | UCD | | | |
| 1955 | UCG | | UCD | |
| 1954 | UCD | | | |
| 1953 | UCD | | | |
| 1952 | UCD | | | |
| 1951 | UCD | | | |
| 1950 | UCD | | | |
| 1949 | UCD/Dublin University ^{[Note 5]} | | | |
| 1948 | UCD | | | |
| 1947 | QUB/Dublin University ^{[Note 4]} | | | |
| 1946 | UCD | | | |
| 1945 | UCD | | | |
| 1944 | UCD | | | |
| 1943 | UCD | | | |
| 1942 | QUB | | | |
| 1941 | UCD | | Dublin University | |
| 1940 | QUB | | | |
| 1939 | QUB | | | |
| 1938 | UCD | | | |
| 1937 | UCD | | | |
| 1936 | UCD | | | |
| 1935 | QUB | | | |
| 1934 | QUB | | | |
| 1933 | ^{[Note 3]} | | | |
| 1932 | ^{[Note 3]} | | | |
| 1931 | QUB | | | |
| 1930 | UCD | | | |
| 1929 | QUB | | | |
| 1928 | UCD | | | |
| 1927 | UCD | | | |
| 1926 | QUB/UCD^{[Note 2]} | | | |
| 1925 | UCD | | | |
| 1924 | QUB/UCD^{[Note 1]} | | | |
| 1923 | QUB | | | |
| 1922 | UCD | | | |
| 1921 | UCD | | | |
| 1920 | QUB | | | |
| 1914 | UCD | 2–1 | QUB | Dalymount Park |

Notes

- ^1 UCD and QUB share cup after a draw in the final and a replay is abandoned after 20 minutes due to bad weather.
- ^2 UCD and QUB draw in final, it is believed both teams shared cup. No reports of a replay.
- ^3 No tournament took place in 1932 and 1933 due to a dispute between the IFA and the FAI.
- ^4 QUB and Dublin University share cup after a draw in the final. The teams agreed on sharing the cup for 6 months each.
- ^5 UCD and Dublin University share cup after a draw in the final.
- ^6 Tournament was played in November and December 1975.
- ^7 Tournament was played in December 1977.
- ^8 After extra time.
- ^9 UUJ win on penalties.
- ^10 UCC won 10–9 on penalties.
- ^11 UCD won 4–2 on penalties.

== List of winners by club ==
| Club | Titles | Seasons |
|---|---|---|
| UCD | 49 | 1921, 1922, 1924, 1925, 1926, 1927, 1928, 1930, 1936, 1937, 1938, 1941, 1943, 1944, 1945, 1946, 1948, 1949, 1950, 1951, 1952, 1953, 1954, 1956, 1958, 1959, 1961, 1969, 1972, 1973, 1976, 1981, 1983, 1984, 1987, 1988, 1989, 1992, 1993, 1994, 2007, 2009, 2010, 2012, 2013, 2016, 2018, 2022, 2023 ^{[Note 1]} ^{[Note 2]} |
| QUB | 23 | 1920, 1923, 1924, 1926, 1929, 1931, 1934, 1935, 1939, 1949, 1942, 1947, 1957, 1960, 1962, 1963, 1964, 1965, 1966, 1975, 1977, 1982, 1985 ^{[Note 1]} ^{[Note 3]} |
| UCC | 14 | 1974, 1978, 1986, 1990, 1991, 2000, 2002, 2003, 2004, 2005, 2011, 2015, 2017, 2019 |
| Ulster Polytechnic/UUJ | 6 | 1980, 1996, 1997, 2001, 2006, 2008 |
| UCG/NUI Galway | 6 | 1955, 1968, 1970, 1971, 1995, 1999 |
| Maynooth University | 4 | 2014, 2021, 2025, 2026 |
| Dublin University | 4 | 1947, 1949, 1967, 1979 ^{[Note 2]} ^{[Note 3]} |
| UL | 1 | 2024 |
| DCU | 1 | 2020 |
| St Mary's (Belfast) | 1 | 1998 |

Notes

- ^1 UCD and QUB shared the cup in 1924 and 1926.
- ^2 UCD and Dublin University shared the cup in 1949.
- ^3 QUB and Dublin University shared the cup in 1947.

== See also ==
Similar intervarsity cup competitions are also played in other sports featuring teams representing universities and institutes of technology from the Republic of Ireland and Northern Ireland. These include:

- Ashbourne Cup – camogie
- O'Connor Cup – ladies Gaelic football
- Fitzgibbon Cup – hurling
- Sigerson Cup – men's gaelic football
