= Rustle =

Rustle, rustler, rustlers or rustling may refer to:

== Livestock theft ==
- Cattle rustling, the theft of cattle
- Horse rustling, the theft of horses
- Bee rustling, the theft of bees

== Arts, entertainment and media ==
- Rustlers (1919 film), an American short Western
- Rustlers (1949 film), an American Western
- King City Rustler, and American local weekly newspaper
- Rustler (video game), an action-adventure video game

== Businesses and organisations ==
- Rustlers (convenience food), a range of burgers and hot sandwiches made by Kepak
- Rustler Steak House, an American steakhouse chain
- Rustler Yachts, a British yachtbuilder

== Other uses ==
- Rustle noise, a noise consisting of aperiodic pulses
- Rustler Formation, a geologic formation in Texas
- Rustler Peak, a summit in the U.S. state of Oregon
- Mazda Rustler, a version of the Ford Bantam pickup truck

== See also ==
- Frühlingsrauschen ('Rustle of Spring'), a solo piano piece by Christian Sinding
