= Ulster University F.C. =

Association football club in Northern Ireland

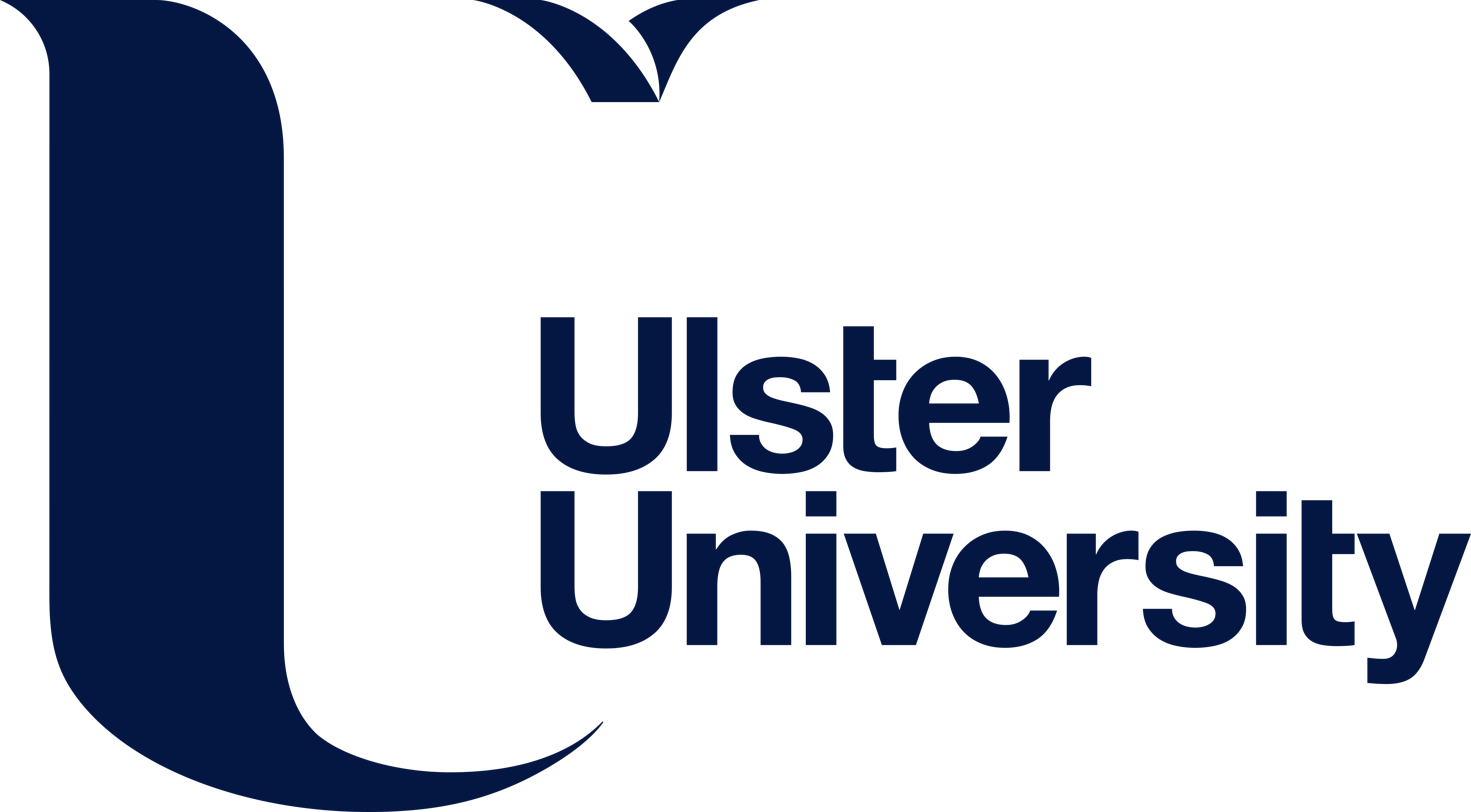
- Full name: Ulster University Football Club
- Nicknames: UU, UUB, Ulster, The Poly
- Founded: 1972
- Ground: Ground share with Nortel FC, Monkstown Avenue, Newtownabbey
- Manager: Billy Youle
- League: Northern Amateur Football League
- Website: http://www.jordanstownfc.com/
Home colours

Ulster University Football Club, referred to simply as Ulster, is a Northern Irish, intermediate football club playing in the Northern Amateur Football League. It is affiliated with Ulster University. The club was formerly known as Ulster University at Jordanstown F.C. or UUJ. The name change occurred following the closure of the Jordanstown Campus.

== History ==
The club was founded as part of Ulster Polytechnic in 1972 and entered the Irish League B Division. The club became UUJ with the amalgamation of the Polytechnic and the New University of Ulster as the University of Ulster in 1984. In 1991, it resigned from the B Division and dropped into the Amateur League. In line with the university's rebrand in October 2014, the club updated its name.

=== Banned from Collingwood ===
On Sunday, 22 February 2015, UU Jordanstown were due to play UCD in the first round of the Collingwood Cup. However, on Friday, 19 February, just two days earlier, the Irish Universities Football Union barred them from the competition. UUJ were banned because they planned to field players from Magee College in the team. Ulster University wanted to enter a single team featuring players from three campuses – Coleraine, Jordanstown and Magee. However, football officials at Coleraine opposed this idea and entered the Collingwood Cup under their own name. Meanwhile, UU decided to enter the tournament as Jordanstown, while Magee opted not to enter the competition. With the Magee club not involved, UU decided to enter a joint team that included players from both Jordanstown and Magee. However, they were informed by IUFU that it was against Collingwood Cup rules to select players from more than one campus. As UU refused to comply with the IUFU requests and enter a team that only consisted of players from the Jordanstown campus, the IUFU opted to expel them from the competition.

== Honours ==
- Northern Amateur Football League 1B: 1
  - 2005–06, 2017–2018
- Northern Amateur Football League 3E: 1
  - 1991–92
- Collingwood Cup: 6
  - 1980, 1996, 1997, 2001, 2006, 2008
- Collingwood Plate: 1
  - 1979
- North/South University League: 3
  - 1979–80, 1990–91, 1991–92
