= List of Grade B+ listed buildings in County Londonderry =

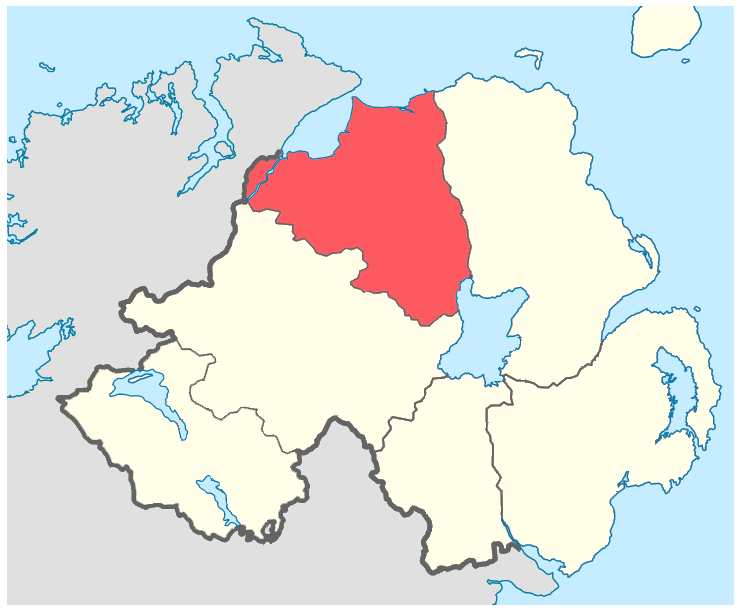
County Londonderry within Ireland

This is a list of Grade B+ listed buildings in County Londonderry, Northern Ireland.

In Northern Ireland, the term listed building refers to a building or other structure officially designated as being of "special architectural or historic interest". Grade B+ structures are those considered to be "buildings which might have merited grade A status but for detracting features such as an incomplete design, lower quality additions or alterations. Also included are buildings that because of exceptional features, interiors or environmental qualities are clearly above the general standard set by grade B buildings. A building may merit listing as grade B+ where its historic importance is greater than a similar building listed as grade B."

Listing began later in Northern Ireland than in the rest of the UK; the first provision for listing was contained in the Planning (Northern Ireland) Order 1972, and the current legislative basis for listing is the Planning (Northern Ireland) Order 1991. Under Article 42 of the Order, the Department of the Environment of the Northern Ireland Executive is required to compile lists of buildings of "special architectural or historic interest". The responsibility for the listing process rests with the Northern Ireland Environment Agency (NIEA), an executive agency within the Department of the Environment.

Following the introduction of listing, an initial survey of Northern Ireland's building stock was begun in 1974. By the time of the completion of this First Survey in 1994, the listing process had developed considerably, and it was therefore decided to embark upon a Second Survey to update and cross-check the original information. As of April 2010, the Second Survey had been completed for 147 of Northern Ireland's 547 council wards, and completion is anticipated by 2016. Information gathered during this survey, relating to both listed and unlisted buildings, is entered into the publicly accessible Northern Ireland Buildings Database. A range of listing criteria, which aim to define architectural and historic interest, have been developed by the NIEA, and are used to determine whether or not to list a building.

Once listed, severe restrictions are imposed on the modifications allowed to a building's structure or its fittings. Listed building consent must be obtained from local authorities prior to any alteration to such a structure. There are approximately 8,500 listed buildings in Northern Ireland, representing 2% of the total building stock. Of these, around 580 are listed at Grade B+.

County Londonderry covers 2,074 square kilometres (801 sq mi), and has a population of around 233,500. The County has 65 Grade B+ listed buildings.

== Listed buildings ==
Building address	Grid Ref. (Note: Sometimes known as OSGB36, the grid reference is based on the British national grid reference system used by the Ordnance Survey.) Geo-coordinates	Type (Note: The type of structure, as identified by the DfC.)	Local authority	Second Survey	Original Survey	HB Number (Note: The "HB Number" is a unique number assigned to each listed building by the DfC.)	Image
Landmore House, Aghadowey, Coleraine		House	Coleraine		B+	HB03/03/032	Upload Photo
Bovagh House, Bovagh, Coleraine		Country House	Coleraine		B+	HB03/03/028	Upload Photo
Presbyterian Church, Church St./Enfield St., Portstewart		Church	Coleraine		B+	HB03/09/001	Upload another image
Bishop's Gate, Mussenden Road, Downhill, Coleraine		School	Coleraine		B+	HB03/12/012	Upload Photo
Mausoleum, Downhill, Coleraine		Memorial	Coleraine		B+	HB03/12/014	Upload another image
Downhill Palace, Downhill		Rectories/ Manses etc	Coleraine		B+	HB03/12/015	Upload another image See more images
Ice House etc, Downhill, Coleraine		Ice House	Coleraine		B+	HB03/12/019	Upload another image
The Granary, Laurel Hill House, Laurel Hill, Coleraine		Farm Buildings	Coleraine		B+	HB03/14/005 B	Upload Photo
St. John's R.C. Church, Kyle's Brae, Coleraine		Church	Coleraine		B+	HB03/15/002	Upload another image See more images
St. Malachy's R.C. Church, Nursery Avenue, Coleraine		Church	Coleraine		B+	HB03/17/016	Upload another image
Town Hall, The Diamond, Coleraine		Town Hall	Coleraine		B+	HB03/18/001	Upload another image See more images
St. Patrick's Church, Church St., Kingsgate St., Coleraine		Church	Coleraine		B+	HB03/18/010	Upload another image See more images
Methodist Church Circular Road, Coleraine		Church	Coleraine		B+	HB03/18/021	Upload another image
Straidarran House, Clagan Road, Claudy BT47 4DB		House	Derry	B+	B1	HB01/01/005	Upload another image
Holy Trinity Church, Cumber Lower, Claudy		Church	Derry		B+	HB01/02/008	Upload Photo
Northern Bank, 11 Main St., Eglinton		Bank	Derry		B+	HB01/03/009	Upload another image
105 Rossdowney Road, Ballyoan BT47 5SU			Derry	B+	B	HB01/05/005	Upload Photo
Star Factory, 79E Foyle Road, Londonderry		Factory	Derry		B+	HB01/17/004	Upload another image
St. Columba's Church, Long Tower St., Londonderry		Church	Derry		B+	HB01/18/003	Upload another image See more images
First Derry Presbyterian Church, Upper Magazine St, Londonderry		Church	Derry		B+	HB01/19/015 A	Upload another image See more images
Northern Bank, 6 Shipquay Place, Londonderry		Bank	Derry		B+	HB01/19/039	Upload another image
Methodist Church, Carlisle Road, Londonderry		Church	Derry		B+	HB01/19/063	Upload Photo
St. Eugene's Cathedral, Francis St., Londonderry		Church	Derry		B+	HB01/21/001	Upload another image See more images
Former Presbyterian Church, Great James St., Londonderry		Church	Derry		B+	HB01/21/009	Upload another image
33 Great James St., Londonderry		House	Derry		B+	HB01/21/010	Upload Photo
Brookhall, 65 Culmore Road, Londonderry BT48 8JE		Country House	Derry	B+	B1	HB01/25/002 A	Upload Photo
Culmore Primary School, 181 Culmore Road, Londonderry BT48 8JH		School	Derry	B+	B	HB01/27/006	Upload Photo
Dogleap Powerhouse, Roe Valley Country Park, 43 Dogleap Road, Largy, Limavady BT49 9NN		Gallery/ Museum	Limavady	B+	B+	HB02/03/008	Upload Photo
Knockan House, 9 Killunaght Road, Dungiven, BT47 4TU		House	Limavady	B+	B	HB02/05/006 A	Upload Photo
Banagher Church of Ireland, Feeny Road, Rallagh, Dungiven		Church	Limavady	B+	B	HB02/05/004	Upload Photo
Ashpark House, 712 Glenshane Road, Feeny BT47 4TG		House	Limavady	B+	B	HB02/05/005 A	Upload Photo
Drumcovit House, 704 Feeny Road, Feeny BT47 4SU		House	Limavady	B+	B1	HB02/05/008 A	Upload Photo
The Old Rectory, Glenshane Road, Dungiven BT47		House	Limavady	B+	B1	HB02/05/003 A	Upload Photo
Pellipar House, Dungiven BT47 4LY		Country House	Limavady	B+	B+	HB02/06/007 A	Upload Photo
Carrick Footbridge. Carrick East Roe Valley Country Park, Limavady BT49 9HA		Bridge	Limavady	B+	B+	HB02/08/009	Upload Photo
Tamlaghtard Rectory, 4 Duncrun Road, Glebe Magilligan, Limavady BT49 0JD		House	Limavady	B+	B1	HB02/09/031	Upload Photo
Thatched House, 326 Seacoast Road, Magilligan, Limavady		House	Limavady	B+	B1	HB02/09/036	Upload Photo
Tamlaght Finlagan Parish Church (C of I), Clooney Road, Ballykelly, Limavady BT49 9HS		Church	Limavady	B+	B+	HB02/10/009 A	Upload another image
Walworth House, 11 Walworth Road, Ballykelly, Limavady BT49 9JU		Country House	Limavady	B+	B1	HB02/10/002	Upload Photo
Aircraft Hangar, Shackleton Barracks, Ballykelly, Limavady		Store	Limavady	B+		HB02/10/027	Upload Photo
Aghanloo Church of Ireland Church, Aghanloo Road, Limavady		Church	Limavady	B+	B+	HB02/11/010 A	Upload another image
2nd Presbyterian Church, Limavady Irish Green Street, Limavady BT49 9AN		Church	Limavady	B+	B	HB02/12/026	Upload Photo
Roe Valley Hospital (Former Workhouse), Benevenagh Avenue, Limavady BT49 OAQ		Hospital Building	Limavady	B+	B	HB02/15/006	Upload Photo
Weddell Bridge, Draperstown		Bridge	Magherafelt		B+	HB08/04/013	Upload Photo
Ballynascreen House, Glebe, Draperstown, Magherafelt		House	Magherafelt		B+	HB08/07/007	Upload Photo
28 Deerpark Road, Old Town, Deerpark, Bellaghy, Magherafelt BT45 8LB		House	Magherafelt	B+	B1	HB08/09/010	Upload Photo
Ballyscullion Park, Ballyscullion, West Bellaghy, Magherafelt		Country House	Magherafelt		B+	HB08/09/011 A	Upload Photo
Moyola Park, Tamniaran, Castledawson, Magherafelt		Country House	Magherafelt		B+	HB08/10/001	Upload Photo
St. Columba's Church, Draperstown, Magherafelt		Church	Magherafelt		B+	HB08/11/001	Upload another image See more images
St. Swithins Church, Church St., Magherafelt		Church	Magherafelt		B+	HB08/15/001	Upload another image See more images
Lissan C. of I. Parish Church, Churchtown, 1 Lissan Road, Cookstown BT80 8EN		Church	Cookstown	B+	B	HB09/03/003	Upload Photo
St Michael's R.C. Church, 9 Clagan Road, Cookstown BT80 9XE		Church	Cookstown	B+	B+	HB09/03/004	Upload another image
Lissan Rectory, 150 Moneymore Road, Cookstown BT80 9UU		Rectories/ Manses etc	Cookstown	B+	B1	HB09/03/001	Upload Photo
Lissan House, Drumgrass Road, Cookstown BT80 9SW		Country House	Cookstown	B+	B1	HB09/03/008 A	Upload Photo
Dunmore, 99 Lough Fea Road, Cookstown BT80 9SR		House	Cookstown	B+	B1	HB09/03/009	Upload Photo
Former Common Barn, 3 Springhill Road, Moneymore, Magherafelt BT45 7NG		Factory	Cookstown	B+	B	HB09/06/022	Upload Photo
1-3 High Street, Moneymore, Magherafelt BT45 7PB		Public House	Cookstown	B+	B+	HB09/06/004 A	Upload Photo
5-7 High Street, Moneymore, Magherafelt BT45 7PB		Shop - Terrace	Cookstown	B+	B+	HB09/06/004 B	Upload Photo
9 High Street, Moneymore, Magherafelt BT45 7PB		House - Terrace	Cookstown	B+	B+	HB09/06/004 C	Upload Photo
11 High Street, Moneymore, Magherafelt BT45 7PB		Shop - Terrace	Cookstown	B+	B+	HB09/06/004 D	Upload Photo
13 High Street, Moneymore, Magherafelt BT45 7PB		House - Terrace	Cookstown	B+	B+	HB09/06/004 E	Upload Photo
6 High Street, Moneymore, Magherafelt BT45 7PD		Assembly Room	Cookstown	B+	B+	HB09/06/008 B	Upload Photo
24 Cookstown Road, Moneymore, Magherafelt BT45 7QF		Rectories/ Manses etc	Cookstown	B+	B1	HB09/06/034	Upload Photo
Coagh Bridge over Ballinderry River at S end of Bridgend Road, Cookstown		Bridge	Cookstown	B+	B	HB09/07/001	Upload another image
New Bridge, Cloghog Road / Lower Grange Road, Cookstown		Bridge	Cookstown	B+	B	HB09/07/006	Upload Photo
