= UUC =

UUC may refer to:

- The Coleraine campus of the University of Ulster
- The Ulster Unionist Council, a forerunner of the Ulster Unionist Party
- A codon for phenylalanine
- The Unitarian Universalist Church
- An Unincorporated Urban Community
- User Uploaded Content
