= St Joseph's College, Coleraine =

Former secondary school in Northern Ireland

Coordinates: 55.12552°N 6.66486°W

St Joseph's College, Coleraine was a Roman Catholic secondary school located in Coleraine, County Londonderry, Northern Ireland. Named after Saint Joseph, there was a statue of Saint Joseph when entering the building.

The school opened in 1961 and was closed in 2019 after 58 years. St. Joseph's merged with Loreto College, Coleraine.

Pupils from year 10 transferred to either Loreto College or Dominican college, Portstewart two years before the closure. Pupils from years 9, and 12 stayed in the St Joseph's Building until its closure in 2019. The final Principal of the school was Mrs. Mary Miller.

== Beresford Campus ==
Northern Regional College used the former St Joseph's College building during the refurbishment of their Union Street campus in Coleraine, which was completed in 2024. The campus has been demolished since May 2026 for plans of new housing on the Beresford Road

== Dereliction and redevelopment ==
After the completion of the Union Street campus the building was abandoned, it remained so as of September 2025, when plans for redevelopment into 91 new social housing units were submitted.

Local graffiti artists and vandals frequently used the abandoned building, attempts were been made to block access but as of 2025 none succeeded.

In early 2026 demolition on the building began in full.
