= Irish Universities Football Union =

- Abbreviation: IUFU
- Formation: 1970–71
- Region served: Republic of Ireland; Northern Ireland
- General Secretary: Eoin Sherlock
- Chairman: Raymond O' Malley
- Treasurer: Michael Willis
- Asst. Secretary: Evan Duggan
- Parent organisation: Football Association of Ireland
- Affiliations: Irish Football Association
- Website: http://www.thirdlevelfootball.ie/iufu/
- Formerly called: Universities and Colleges Football Union

The Irish Universities Football Union is the governing body for university association football in the Republic of Ireland and Northern Ireland. It is responsible for organizing the Collingwood Cup, the major cup competition for Irish universities. It also manages the only two all Ireland association football leagues – the College & Universities Football League and the Women's Soccer Colleges Association of Ireland League. It is affiliated to the Dublin–based Football Association of Ireland and works closely with both the College Football Association of Ireland (CFAI) and the Belfast–based Irish Football Association. The IUFU also selects the teams that represent Ireland at the Summer Universiade.

== History ==
=== Early years ===
The IUFU was originally formed in 1970–71 as the Universities and Colleges Football Union under the leadership of Dr. Tony O'Neill, the club secretary/manager of University College Dublin A.F.C. and an FAI general secretary. In 1972 a separate association, the CFAI, was established for college teams. The IUFU initially took over the organisation of the Collingwood Cup before introducing new competitions such as the Collingwood Plate, the North–South University League, the Harding Cup for first year students and the Crowley Cup for reserve team players. In 2006–07 the IUFU, in conjunction with the CFAI, established the Umbro sponsored Colleges and Universities Football League.

=== Ulster University dispute ===
In 2015 the IUFU became involved in an internal dispute involving Ulster University and their campus football teams. On Sunday, 22 February 2015, UU Jordanstown were due to play UCD in the first round of the Collingwood Cup. However, on Friday, 19 February, just two days earlier, the IUFU barred them from the competition. UUJ were banned because they planned to field players from Magee College in the team. Ulster University wanted to enter a single team featuring players from three campuses – Coleraine, Jordanstown and Magee. However football officials at Coleraine opposed this idea and entered the Collingwood Cup under their own name. Meanwhile, UU decided to enter the tournament as Jordanstown, while Magee opted not to enter the competition. With the Magee club not involved, UU decided to enter a joint team that included players from both Jordanstown and Magee. However, they were informed by IUFU that it was against Collingwood Cup rules to select players from more than one campus. As UU refused to comply with the IUFU requests and enter a team that only consisted of players from the Jordanstown campus, the IUFU opted to expel them from the competition. Meanwhile, the team representing Coleraine competed in the tournament, however according to club officials, they did not receive any funding from their Ulster University, who do not recognise them as an official university team.

== Representative games ==
The IUFU selects teams to play against teams representing the CFAI and Irish Defence Forces. The IUFU also chooses a team to represent Ireland at the Summer Universiade.

== Cup competitions ==
Competitions associated with the organisation include:

- Collingwood Cup – senior first team competition
  - Farquhar Cup – defeated Collingwood Cup quarter finalists
  - Spillane Cup – teams knocked out in Collingwood Cup first round
  - Duggan Cup – teams knocked out in Collingwood Cup first round
- Crowley Cup – features the reserve university teams
- Harding Cup – teams are made up first year students

== Affiliated leagues ==
- College & Universities Football League
- Women's Soccer Colleges Association of Ireland League

== Affiliated universities/clubs ==
Several clubs affiliated to the IUFU play in leagues and divisions within the Republic of Ireland and Northern Ireland football league systems. These include:

Team	League
University College Dublin A.F.C.	League of Ireland First Division
Queen's University Belfast A.F.C.	NIFL Championship 2
University College Cork A.F.C.	Munster Senior League Senior Premier Division
NUI Galway	Galway & District League
Ulster University at Jordanstown Football Club	Northern Amateur Football League
Dublin University A.F.C.	Leinster Senior League
Ulster University at Coleraine	College & Universities Football League
Dublin City University	College & Universities Football League
Dublin Institute of Technology	College & Universities Football League
University of Limerick	College & Universities Football League
Magee College	College & Universities Football League
Mary Immaculate College, Limerick	College & Universities Football League
Maynooth University	College & Universities Football League
Royal College of Surgeons in Ireland	College & Universities Football League
Stranmillis University College	College & Universities Football League
St Mary's University College, Belfast	College & Universities Football League
St Patrick's College, Dublin	College & Universities Football League

== See also ==
- Irish Universities Rugby Union
- Higher Education GAA
- Munster Football Association
- Leinster Football Association
- Women's Football Association of Ireland
- Galway Football Association
- Connacht Football Association
