= Catherine Drew =

Irish journalist & writer (1832–1910)

- Born: 27 May 1832; Broughshane, County Antrim, Ireland
- Died: 26 August 1910 (aged 78); Holland Street, Kensington, London
- Relatives: Thomas Drew (brother)

Catherine Drew (27 May 1832 – 26 August 1910) was an Anglo-Irish journalist and writer.

== Life ==
Catherine Drew was born in Broughshane, County Antrim on 27 May 1832. Her parents were the Rev. Thomas Drew and Isabella (née Dalton) Drew. She was the third of the couple's eight daughters and four sons, although most of her siblings died young. Drew spent her childhood in Belfast, where her father was the rector of Christ Church in Durham Street from 1833 to 1859. Drew moved to Dublin at 60 Upper Sackville Street to live with her brother the architect, Thomas Drew, in 1866.

== Career ==
From here she appears to have begun her journalist career, writing articles for the Irish Builder, going on to eventually become its assistant editor. She went on to write for the Belfast Newsletter, and following advice from its proprietor James Alexander Henderson, Drew moved to London in 1871 becoming the paper's London correspondent. She wrote two columns, Metropolitan gossip and Ladies' letter, and were among some of the earliest regular columns written specifically for women, providing society news for her readers in Belfast. Articles by her also appeared in The Literary World, The British Architect and London Society.

Drew was one of the founding members of the Ladies' Press Association, and campaigned for greater rights for women journalists. She became a prominent figure in the Institute of Journalists, representing the Institute at several international congresses. She was serving as the vice-president of the Institute at the time of her death. She also worked on its Orphan Fund for many years, an initiative she had originally suggested in 1891.

In 1894, she was one of the signatories of the Frances Power Cobbe memorial campaigning for greater recognition and rights for women journalists, alongside Millicent Fawcett and Jessie Boucherett. Drew wrote a number of novels, including Harry Chalgraves's legacy (1876) and The Lutanistes of St Jacobi's (1881). In March 1885 she gave a lecture titled Dress, economic and technic at the Exhibition of Women's Industries in Bristol, which later appeared as a pamphlet.

== Death ==
She died at her home in Holland Street, Kensington on 26 August 1910 and is buried at Kensington Hanwell Cemetery, Broadway. Lady Drew, her sister-in-law, erected a Celtic cross memorial there in her honour. She bequeathed a jewel-studded gold bracelet to the Institute of Journalists, which had been presented to her by the Institute to mark her retirement in 1908. It is worn by women presidents or the wives of male presidents, and is known as the "Drew Bracelet."
