= Walter Merrett =

British sculptor (1855–1918)

- Born: 1855; Bethnal Green, England
- Died: 1918 (aged 62–63)
- Known for: Sculpture

Walter Merrett (born Walter Merrett Lack; 1855–1918) was a British portrait sculptor. He was active between 1873 and 1911.

== Early life ==
Merrett was born in Bethnal Green, London, in 1855. His father was a cheesemonger who was married to his second wife, Louisa Eleanor.

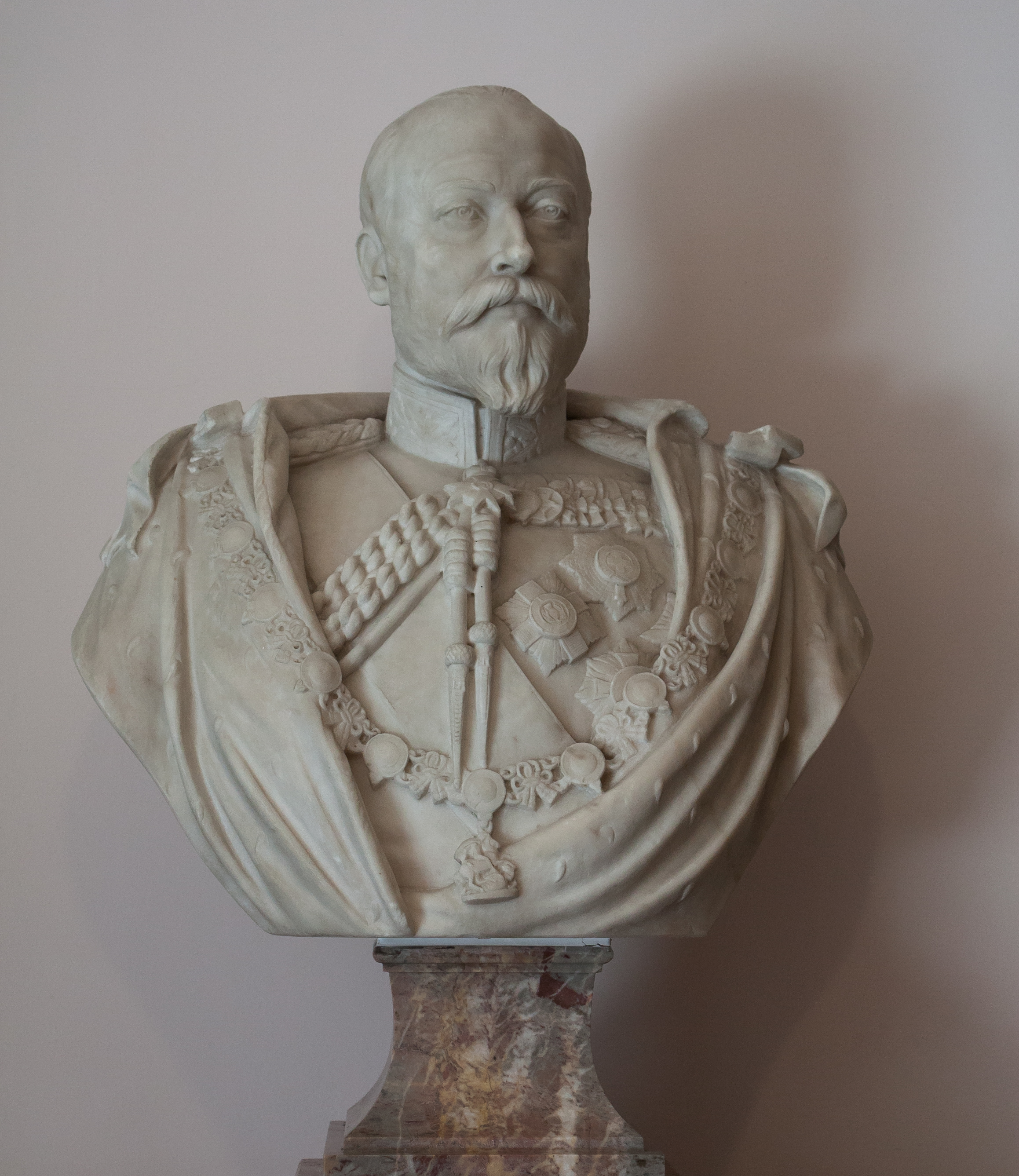
A marble bust of Edward VII by Merrett, completed in 1904, on display at Coleraine Town Hall
