= Hilary Stevenson =

Food scientist (1947–1994)

- Born: Mary Hill Morrison; 12 January 1947; Coleraine, County Londonderry
- Died: 10 May 1994 (aged 47)
- Occupations: scientist, researcher
- Known for: study of food irradiation
- Spouse: Noel Stevenson
- Awards: OBE (1993)

Academic background
- Education: University of Strathclyde, Queen's University Belfast

Academic work
- Discipline: nutritional science, food chemistry, agricultural science
- Sub-discipline: food irradiation
- Institutions: Queen's University Belfast

Hilary Stevenson (12 January 1947 – 5 October 1994) was a food scientist and professor from Northern Ireland who made significant scientific contributions to the study of food irradiation in the 1980s and 1990s.

== Early life ==
Mary Hill (Hilary) Morrison was born in Coleraine, County Londonderry on 12 January 1947. She was the only daughter of James Stewart Morrison and Elizabeth Morrison (née Martin). She was raised at Drumaduan in the townland of Ballyrashane and attended Coleraine High School.

== Education ==
Stevenson attended Queen's University Belfast where she graduated with first class honours in Chemistry in 1969 and Agriculture in 1970. She completed her M.Sc. in Food Science and Microbiology in 1971 from the University of Strathclyde. By 1981 she completed her doctoral studies, with her PhD dissertation focusing on metabolism of minerals by poultry.

== Career ==
Stevenson joined the Department of Agriculture for Northern Ireland (DANI) after her undergraduate degrees, becoming an agricultural inspector. At this time she also lectured at the Loughry College of Agriculture and Food Technology. By 1974 she was promoted to senior scientific officer and had transferred to the Agricultural Chemistry Research Division. At this time she took up a position as university lecturer in the Department of Agriculture and Food Science at Queen's University Belfast.

== Research contributions ==
In the early years of her research career, Stevenson focused on the vitamin content of peas before and after processing, later shifting her interest to the absorption of minerals by sheep. By the 1980s, her research had narrowed to poultry nutrition, publishing work on chickens and geese in UK agricultural journals such as British Poultry Science and the Journal of the Science of Food and Agriculture. Stevenson's most significant scientific contribution was her research on food irradiation, which she took up in the 1980s. She became an influential expert in the area, publishing over forty papers on the topic, collaborating with international partners on research studies, and organizing gatherings under the auspices of the United Nations. Her work or irradiation was recognized in 1993 when she was appointed to the Order of the British Empire (OBE).

Stevenson was an active member of several professional organizations, including the Northern Ireland branch of the Institute of Food Science and Technology, the Nutrition Society, the journal of British Poultry Science, and was a fellow of the Royal Society of Chemistry.

== Personal life ==
She married Noel Stevenson in 1976 and the couple lived in Lisburn, County Antrim. She died at the age of 47 on 5 October 1994, after a prolonged illness.

== Selected works ==
=== Books ===
- Johnson, D.E. and M.H. Stevenson, editors. Food Irradiation and the Chemist: the proceedings of an international symposium organized by the Food Chemistry Group of the Royal Society of Chemistry as part of the Annual Chemical Congress 1990: Queen's University Belfast, 10–11 April 1990.Cambridge: Royal Society of Chemistry, 1990. ISBN 0851868576

=== Journal articles ===
- Graham, W. D., Stevenson, M. H., & Stewart, E. M. (1998a). Effect of irradiation dose and irradiation temperature on the thiamin content of raw and cooked chicken breast meat. Journal of the Science of Food and Agriculture, 78(4), 559–564.
- Graham, W. D., Stevenson, M. H., & Stewart, E. M. (1998b). Effect of irradiation dose and irradiation temperature on the thiamin content of raw and cooked chicken breast meat. Journal of the Science of Food and Agriculture, 78(4), 559–564.
- Gray, R., & Stevenson, M. H. (1989). Detection of irradiated deboned turkey meat using electron spin resonance spectroscopy. International Journal of Radiation Applications & Instrumentation. Part C, Radiation Physics & Chemistry, 34(6), 899–902.
- Gray, R., & Stevenson, M. H. (1989a). The effect of post‐irradiation cooking on the ESR signal in irradiated chicken drumsticks. International Journal of Food Science & Technology, 24(4), 447–450.
- Gray, R., & Stevenson, M. H. (1989b). The effect of post‐irradiation cooking on the ESR signal in irradiated chicken drumsticks. International Journal of Food Science & Technology, 24(4), 447–450.
- Gray, R., Stevenson, M. H., & Kilpatrick, D. J. (1990a). The effect of irradiation dose and age of bird on the ESR signal in irradiated chicken drumsticks. International Journal of Radiation Applications & Instrumentation. Part C, Radiation Physics & Chemistry, 35(1–3), 284–287.
- Gray, R., Stevenson, M. H., & Kilpatrick, D. J. (1990b). The effect of irradiation dose and age of bird on the ESR signal in irradiated chicken drumsticks. International Journal of Radiation Applications & Instrumentation. Part C, Radiation Physics & Chemistry, 35(1–3), 284–287.
- Gray, R., Stevenson, M. H., & Kilpatrick, D. J. (1990c). The effect of irradiation dose and age of bird on the ESR signal in irradiated chicken drumsticks. International Journal of Radiation Applications & Instrumentation. Part C, Radiation Physics & Chemistry, 35(1–3), 284–287.
- Hamilton, L., Stevenson, M. H., Boyd, D. R., Brannigan, I. N., Treacy, A. B., Hamilton, J. T. G., McRoberts, W. C., & Elliott, C. T. (1996). Detection of 2-substituted cyclobutanones as irradiation products of lipid-containing foods: Synthesis and applications of cis- and trans-2-(tetradec-5′-enyl)cyclobutanones and 11-(2′-oxocyclobutyl)undecanoic acid. Journal of the Chemical Society, Perkin Transactions 1, 1996(2), 139–146.
- Jackson, N., & Stevenson, M. H. (1981a). A study of the effects of dietary added cupric oxide on the laying, domestic fowl and a comparison with the effects of hydrated copper sulphate. British Journal of Nutrition, 45(1), 99–110.
- Jackson, N., & Stevenson, M. H. (1981b). Identification of the component responsible for the effects of added dietary copper sulphate in the female domestic fowl. Journal of the Science of Food and Agriculture, 32(11), 1047–1056.
- Jackson, N., Stevenson, M. H., & Kirkpatrick, G. M. (1979). Effects of the protracted feeding of copper sulphate-supplemented diets to laying, domestic fowl on egg production and on specific tissues, with special reference to mineral content. British Journal of Nutrition, 42(2), 253–266.
- Millar, S. J., Moss, B. W., MacDougall, D. B., & Stevenson, M. H. (1995). The effect of ionising radiation on the CIELAB colour co‐ordinates of chicken breast meat as measured by different instruments. International Journal of Food Science & Technology, 30(5), 663–674.
- Stevenson, M. H., & Graham, W. D. (1983). The chemical composition and true metabolisable energy content of cassava root meal imported into Northern Ireland. Journal of the Science of Food and Agriculture, 34(10), 1105–1107.
- Stevenson, M. H., & Gray, R. (1989). An investigation into the effect of sample preparation methods on the resulting ESR signal from irradiated chicken bone. Journal of the Science of Food and Agriculture, 48(3), 261–267.
- Stevenson, M. H., & Jackson, N. (1979). The accumulation of copper in the liver of the domestic laying hen. Proceedings of the Nutrition Society, 38(2). Scopus.
- Stevenson, M. H., & Jackson, N. (1980a). Effects of level of dietary copper sulphate and period of feeding on the laying, domestic fowl, with special reference to tissue mineral content. British Journal of Nutrition, 43(1), 205–215.
- Stevenson, M. H., & Jackson, N. (1980b). Effects of withdrawal of copper sulphate from the diet of the mature domestic fowl with special reference to production and tissue mineral content. British Journal of Nutrition, 43(3), 551–559.
- Stevenson, M. H., & Jackson, N. (1981a). An attempt to distinguish between the direct and indirect effects, in the laying domestic fowl, of added dietary copper sulphate. British Journal of Nutrition, 46(1), 71–76.
- Stevenson, M. H., & Jackson, N. (1981b). The nutritional value of dried skim milk in broiler diets. Journal of the Science of Food and Agriculture, 32(1), 79–86.
- Stevenson, M. H., & Unsworth, E. F. (1978). Studies on the absorption of calcium, phosphorus, magnesium, copper and zinc by sheep fed on roughage-cereal diets. British Journal of Nutrition, 40(3), 491–496.
- Stewart, E. M., & Stevenson, M. H. (1997). Identification of Irradiated Norway Lobster (Nephrops norvegicus) Using Electron Spin Resonance (ESR) Spectroscopy and Estimation of Applied Dose Using Re‐irradiation: Results of an In‐House Blind Trial. Journal of the Science of Food and Agriculture, 74(4), 469–472.
- Stewart, E. M., Stevenson, M. H., & Gray, R. (1991). Use of esr spectroscopy for the detection of irradiated whiting (Merlangius merlangus). Journal of the Science of Food and Agriculture, 55(4), 653–660.
- Stewart, E. M., Stevenson, M. H., & GRAY, R. (1992). Detection of irradiation in scampi tails—Effects of sample preparation, irradiation dose and storage on ESR response in the cuticle. International Journal of Food Science & Technology, 27(2), 125–132.
- Stewart, E. M., Stevenson, M. H., & Gray, R. (1994). Use of ESR spectroscopy for the detection of irradiated Crustacea. Journal of the Science of Food and Agriculture, 65(2), 191–197.
- Stewart, E. M., Stevenson, M. H., Gray, R., & McMurray, C. H. (1993). The effect of processing treatments on the radiation-induced ESR signal in the cuticle of irradiated Norwat lobster (Nephrops norvegicus). Radiation Physics and Chemistry, 42(1–3), 367–370.
- Victoria, A., Crone, J., Hamilton, J. T. G., & Stevenson, M. H. (1992). Detection of 2‐dodecylcyclobutanone in radiation‐sterilized chicken meat stored for several years. International Journal of Food Science & Technology, 27(6), 691–696.

== Awards ==
- Officer of the Order of the British Empire (OBE), 1993
