= Coleraine Town Hall =

Municipal building in Coleraine, Northern Ireland

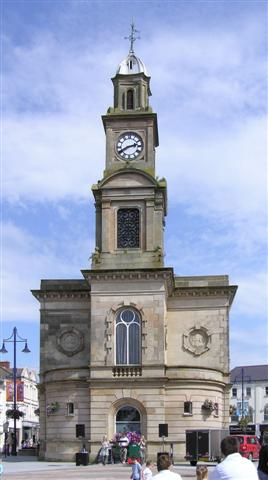
- Coleraine Town Hall

- Shown in Northern Ireland
- 55.1316°N 6.6712°W
- Location: The Diamond, Coleraine

History
- Built: 1859

Site notes
- Architect: Thomas Turner
- Architectural style: Italianate style

Listed Building – Grade B1
- Official name: Town Hall
- Designated: 25 May 1976
- Reference no.: HB 03/18/001

Coleraine Town Hall is a municipal structure in The Diamond in Coleraine, County Londonderry, Northern Ireland. The town hall, which was the headquarters of Coleraine Borough Council, is a Grade B1 listed building.

== History ==
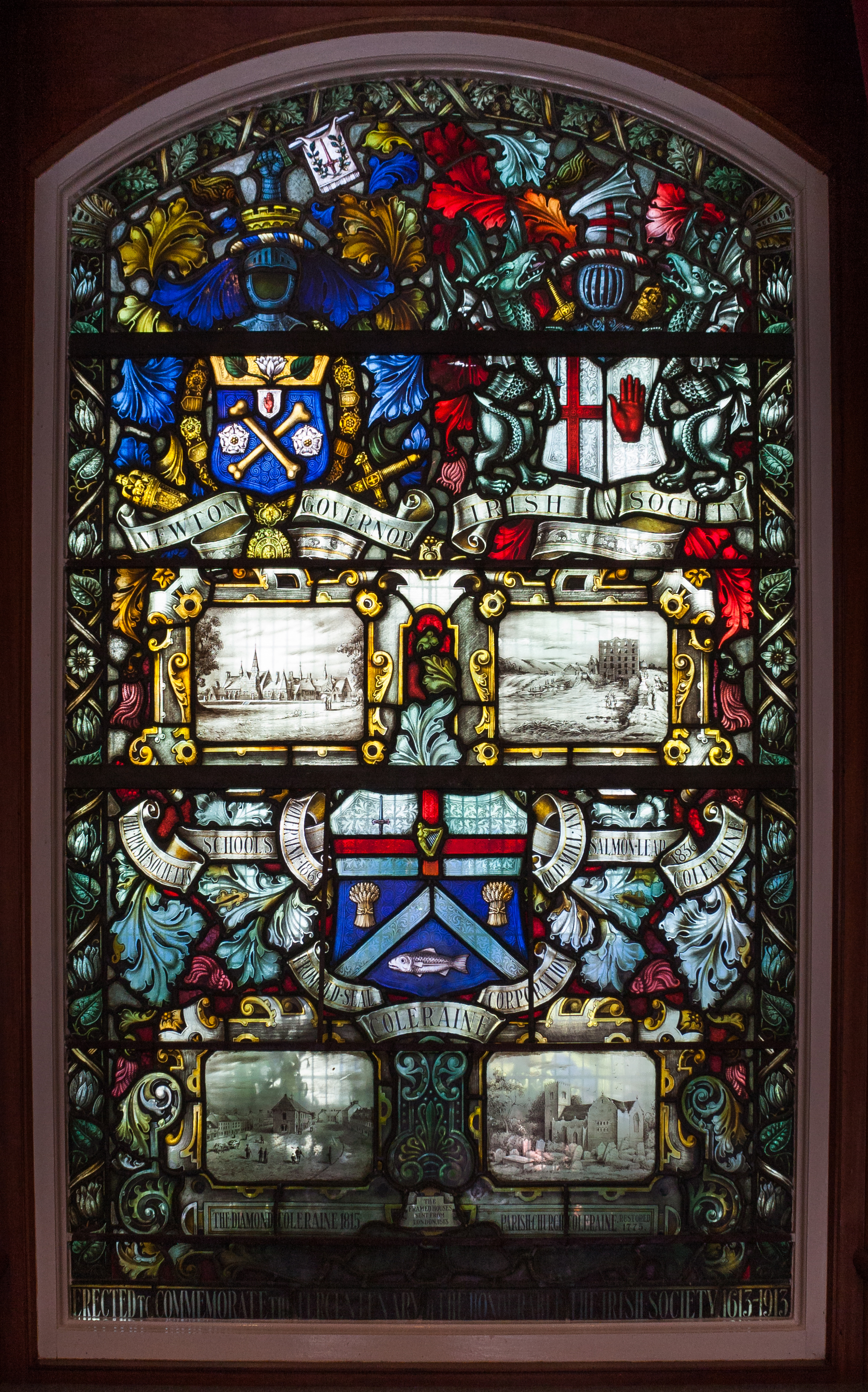
Stained glass window commemorating The Honourable The Irish Society

The current building was commissioned to replace an earlier market house which was financed by The Honourable The Irish Society and completed in 1743. In the 1840s, after the market house became dilapidated, civic leaders decided to construct a new town hall on the same site.

The foundation stone for the new building was laid on 21 July 1857. It was designed by Thomas Turner in the Italianate style and built in ashlar stone by McLaughlin & Harvey at a cost of £4,147, with the majority of the funds again coming from The Honourable The Irish Society. Its completion coincided with the 1859 Ulster revival: "nearly one hundred persons agonised in mind through conviction of sin, and entirely prostrate in body, were borne into the building to obtain shelter" on the day of its first public opening, 9 June 1859.

The design involved a symmetrical main frontage with three bays facing west onto The Diamond; the central bay, which slightly projected forward, featured a five-stage tower with a chamfered round headed window on the ground floor flanked by small casement windows on curved walls which swept round to the side elevations. The second stage of the tower featured a mullioned window flanked by blank oculi in bays which were well recessed. The third stage of the tower was Baroque in appearance with pilasters supporting segmental pediments, while the fourth stage featured a clock and the fifth stage displayed a lantern with a cupola.

The unionist politician, Hugh T. Barrie, became the first person to sign the Ulster Covenant at the town hall in protest against the Third Home Rule Bill introduced by the British Government in 1912. A stained glass window, depicting four local scenes, which was made by Campbell Brothers Belfast to commemorate the tercentenary of The Honourable The Irish Society, was installed in the town hall in 1913.

The town was advanced to the status of municipal borough, with the town hall as its headquarters, in 1928. The town hall continued to serve as a meeting place for Coleraine Borough Council until it moved to new offices on Portstewart Road in the mid-1970s. The town hall subsequently became a venue for events and exhibitions.

On 13 November 1992 the Provisional Irish Republican Army detonated a 500 pounds (230 kg) van bomb in the town centre: substantial property damage was caused, leading to several major buildings being demolished, but no one was killed. The town hall required major structural work, and was not reopened until August 1995.

A commemorative window to commemorate the Golden Jubilee of Elizabeth II was installed in the town hall in 2003. Other works of art include busts by Walter Merrett of King Edward VII and Queen Alexandra. Queen Elizabeth II visited the town hall and laid a wreath to commemorate the start of the First World War on 25 June 2014.

== See also ==
- List of Grade B+ listed buildings in County Londonderry
