= Irish Society Primary School =

School in Coleraine, Northern Ireland

Location
- Rugby Avenue, Coleraine, Northern Ireland, BT52 1JL
- 55.12215°N 6.66092°W

Information
- Motto: Domine Dirige Nos (Lord Guide Us)
- Educational authority: Northern Ireland Education Authority
- Principal: C. A. Murdock BA(Hons), MSc, PGCE, PQH(NI)
- Age range: 4-11 year olds
- Website: https://www.irishsocietyps.co.uk/

The Irish Society Primary School is a school in Coleraine, Northern Ireland.

== History ==
The Irish Society Primary School was started by a London livery company called The Honourable The Irish Society following the Plantation of Ulster in the 17th Century. The school continues to take an annual trip for Primary 7 pupils to London to visit sites and the Guildhall, where The Honourable The Irish Society still has its headquarters.

The school moved to its current site in 1979.
