= Northern Regional College =

Educational institution in Northern Ireland, United Kingdom

Coordinates: 54.715°N 6.210°W

- Established: 2007
- Principal: Mel Higgins
- Location: Ballymena, Coleraine, Magherafelt and Newtownabbey, Northern Ireland
- Website: www.nrc.ac.uk

Northern Regional College (or NRC) is a third level educational institution in Northern Ireland, United Kingdom. The college has four campuses around the north-east of Northern Ireland (County Antrim and eastern County Londonderry): Ballymena, Coleraine, Magherafelt and Newtownabbey.

== History ==
The college was set up following a review of further education in Northern Ireland. NRC includes campuses from three predecessor institutions:

- Causeway Institute
- East Antrim Institute
- North East Institute
