= Coleraine Whiskey =

Famous whiskey, which supplied the UK Parliament in the 19th Century

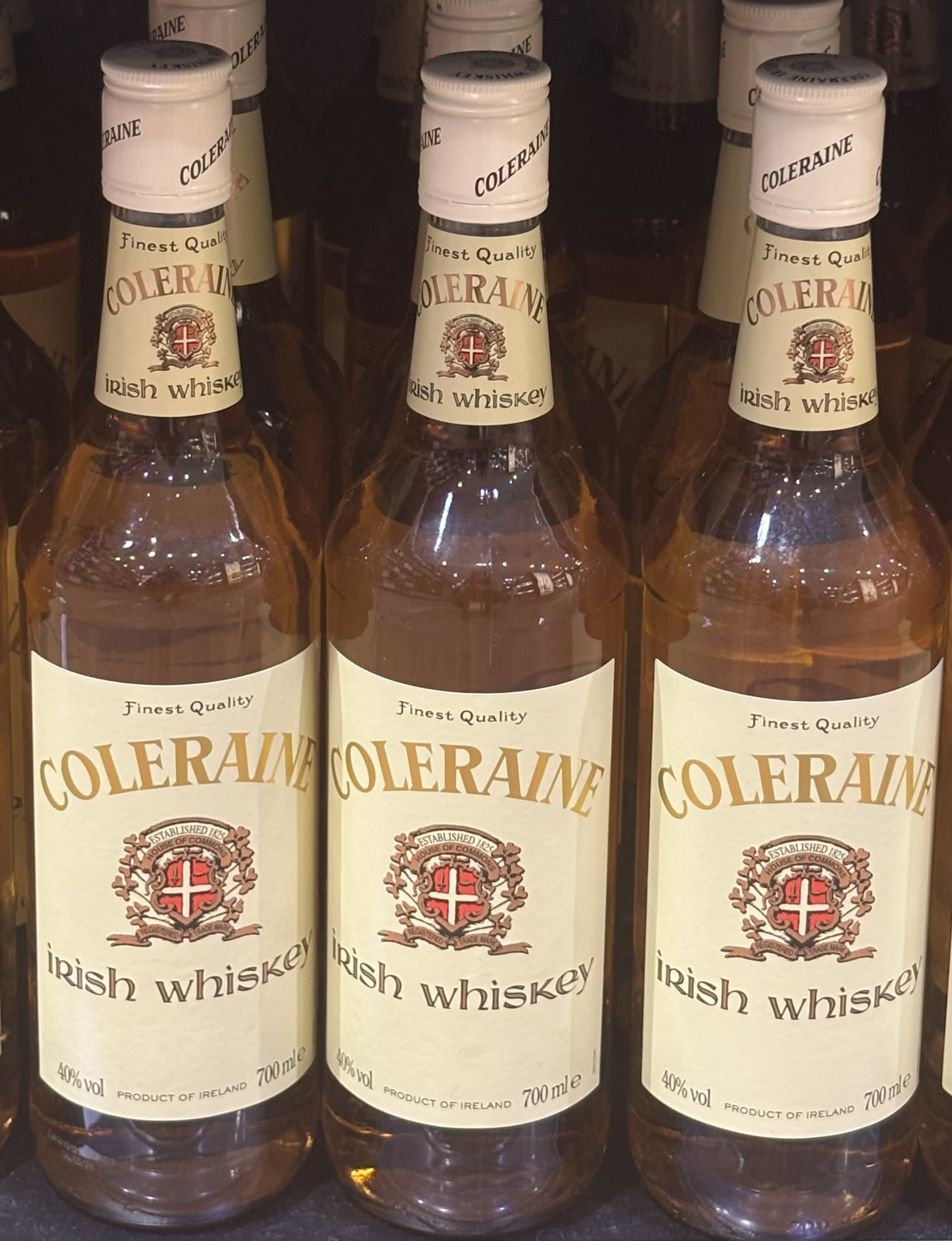
Coleraine Whiskey on sale at Belfast International Airport, 2025

Coleraine Whiskey is a brand of Irish whiskey which was originally distilled in Coleraine, Northern Ireland.

== History ==
Coleraine Distillery was established on Newmarket Street in the town in 1820. From 1845 the distillery supplied whiskey to the House of Commons and the distillery began placing "HC" on its bottle labels.

Robert Taylor, a High Sheriff who was knighted in 1899, purchased Coleraine Distillery in 1869. His brother, Daniel Taylor, was the Member of Parliament for Coleraine from 1874 - 1880.

The Coleraine Distillery closed its doors in 1978. Production was moved to Bushmills Distillery until 2005, when the brand was sold to Irish Distillers in Cork, Ireland.
