= Edmund Mackenzie Young =

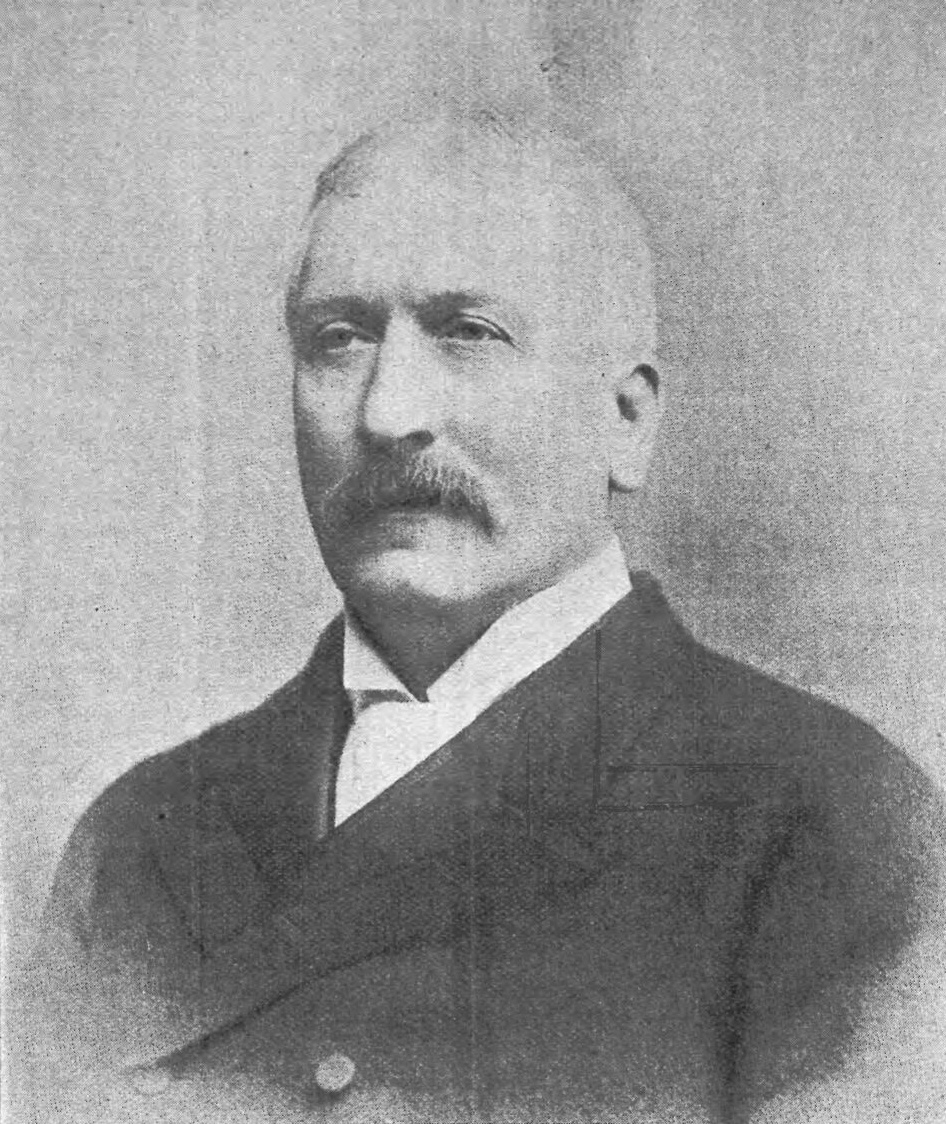
E. M. Young

Edmund Mackenzie "Edmond" Young (1838 – 23 April 1897) was an Australian banker, financier/investor and grazier. Young was born in Coleraine, County Londonderry, Ireland, and died in Sydney, New South Wales.

== See also ==
- William Spence
- George Dibbs
- James MacBain
