= Coleraine =

Town in County Londonderry, Northern Ireland

Coordinates: 55°07′55″N 6°40′01″W

Coleraine: Irish: Cúil Raithin; Scots: Cowlrain or Cowlraine
- Town
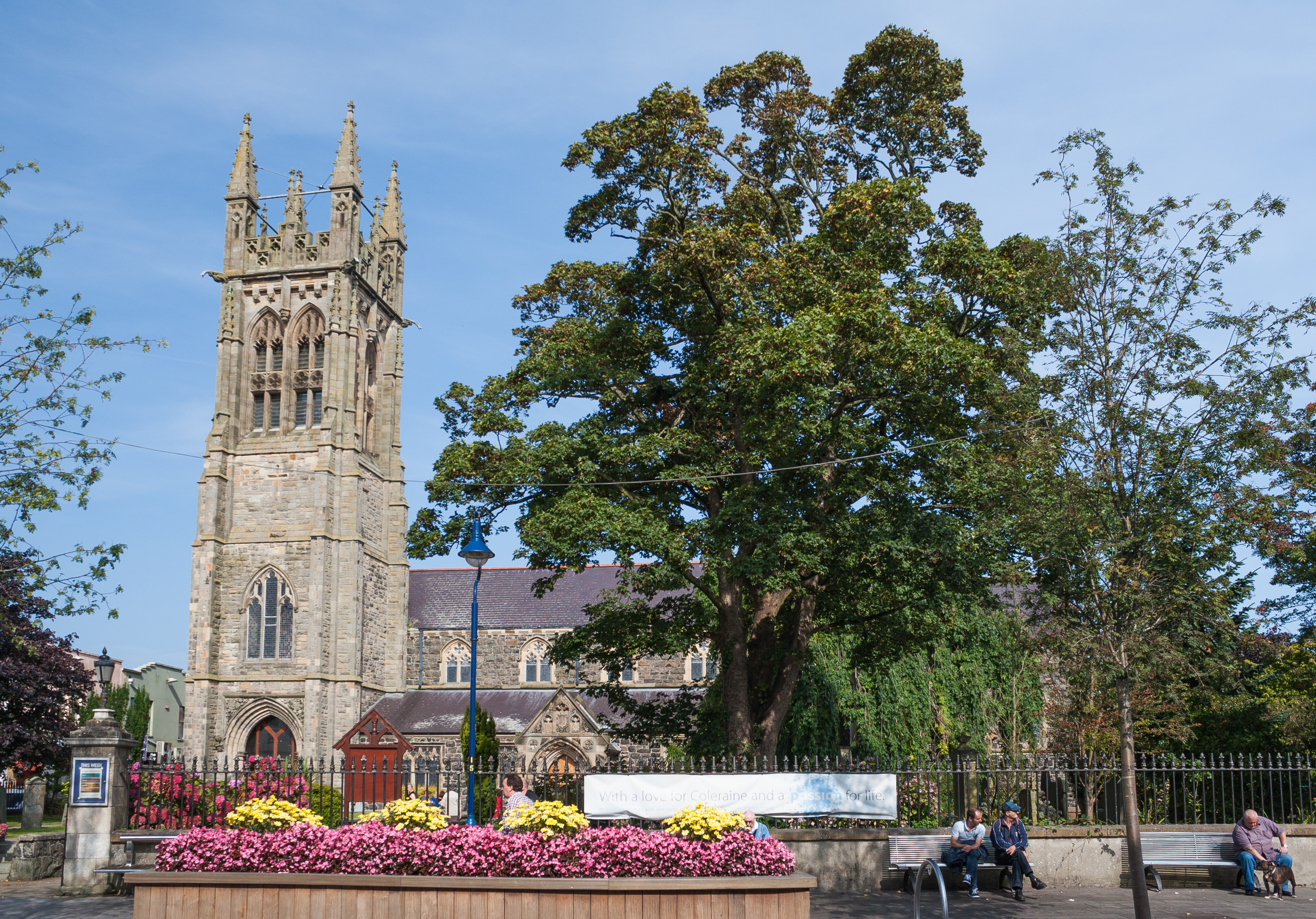
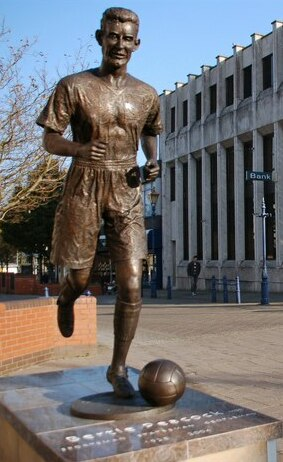
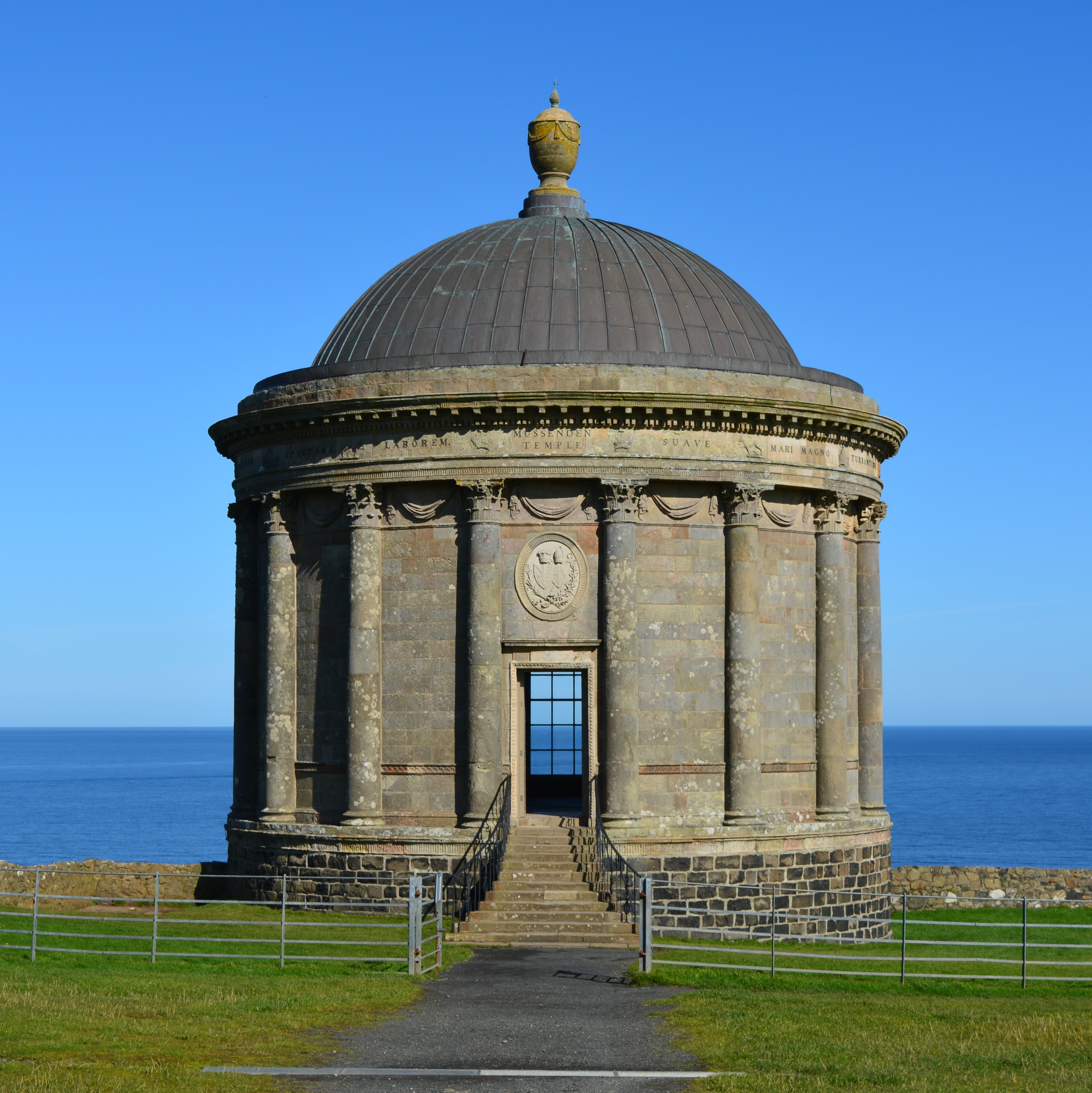
- Top: Coleraine Town Hall, Middle: St Patrick's Church, Bertie Peacock statue, Bottom: Mount Sandel Fort, Mussenden Temple

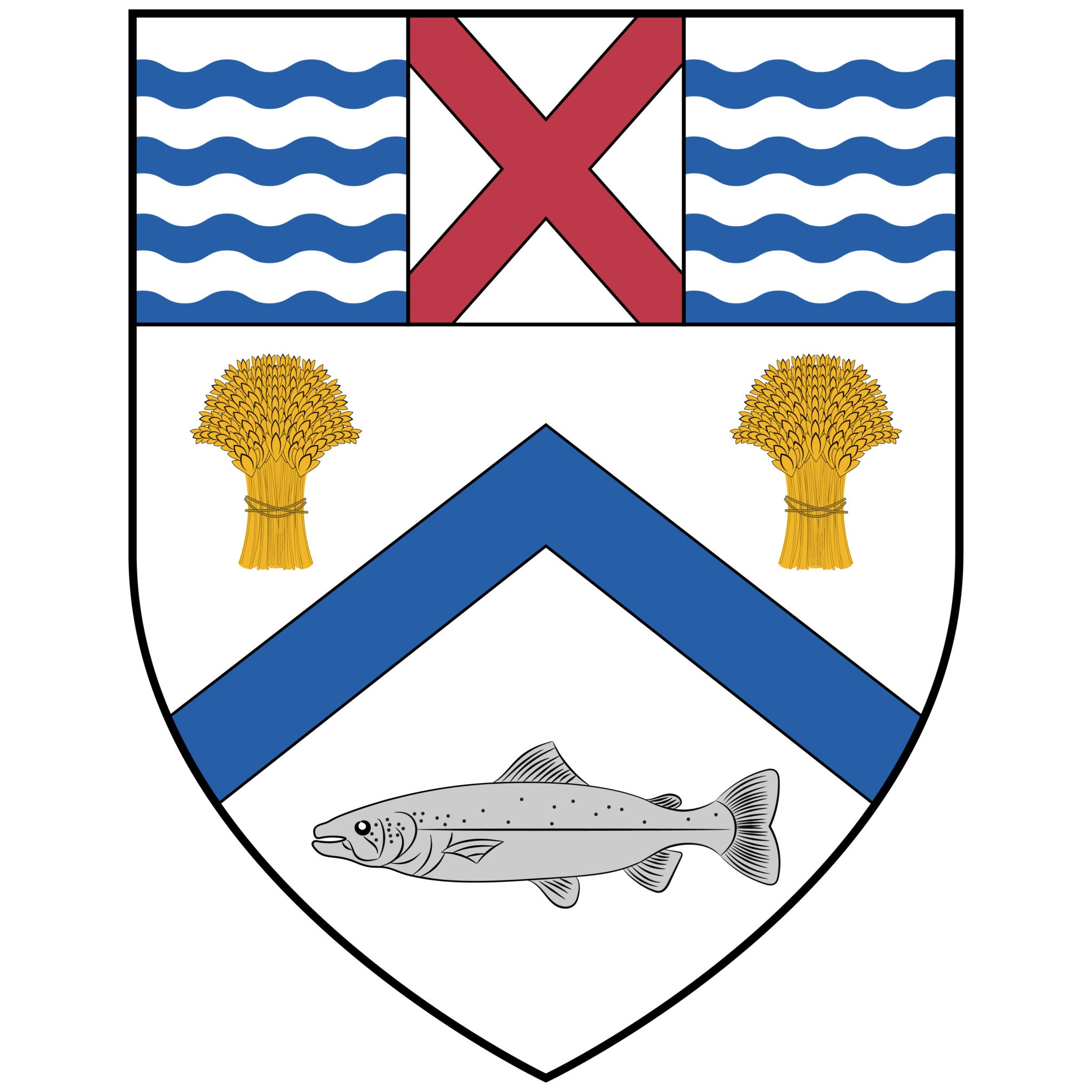
- Coat of Arms

- Location within Northern Ireland
- Population: 24,483 (2021 census)
- Irish grid reference: C844328
- District: Causeway Coast and Glens
- County: County Londonderry
- Country: Northern Ireland
- Sovereign state: United Kingdom
- Post town: COLERAINE
- Postcode district: BT51, BT52
- Dialling code: 028
- Police: Northern Ireland
- Fire: Northern Ireland
- Ambulance: Northern Ireland
- UK Parliament: East Londonderry
- NI Assembly: East Londonderry

Coleraine (/koʊlˈreɪn/ kohl-RAYN; from Irish: Cúil Raithin [ˌkuːlʲ ˈɾˠahənʲ], 'nook of the ferns') is a market town and civil parish near the mouth of the River Bann in County Londonderry, Northern Ireland, of which it is the county town. It is 55 miles (89 km) north-west of Belfast and 30 miles (48 km) east of Derry, both of which are linked by major roads and railway connections. The town had a population of 24,483 people in the 2021 census.

Coleraine has a large catchment area and is designated as a "major growth area" in the Northern Ireland Development Strategy. The town is part of Causeway Coast and Glens district.

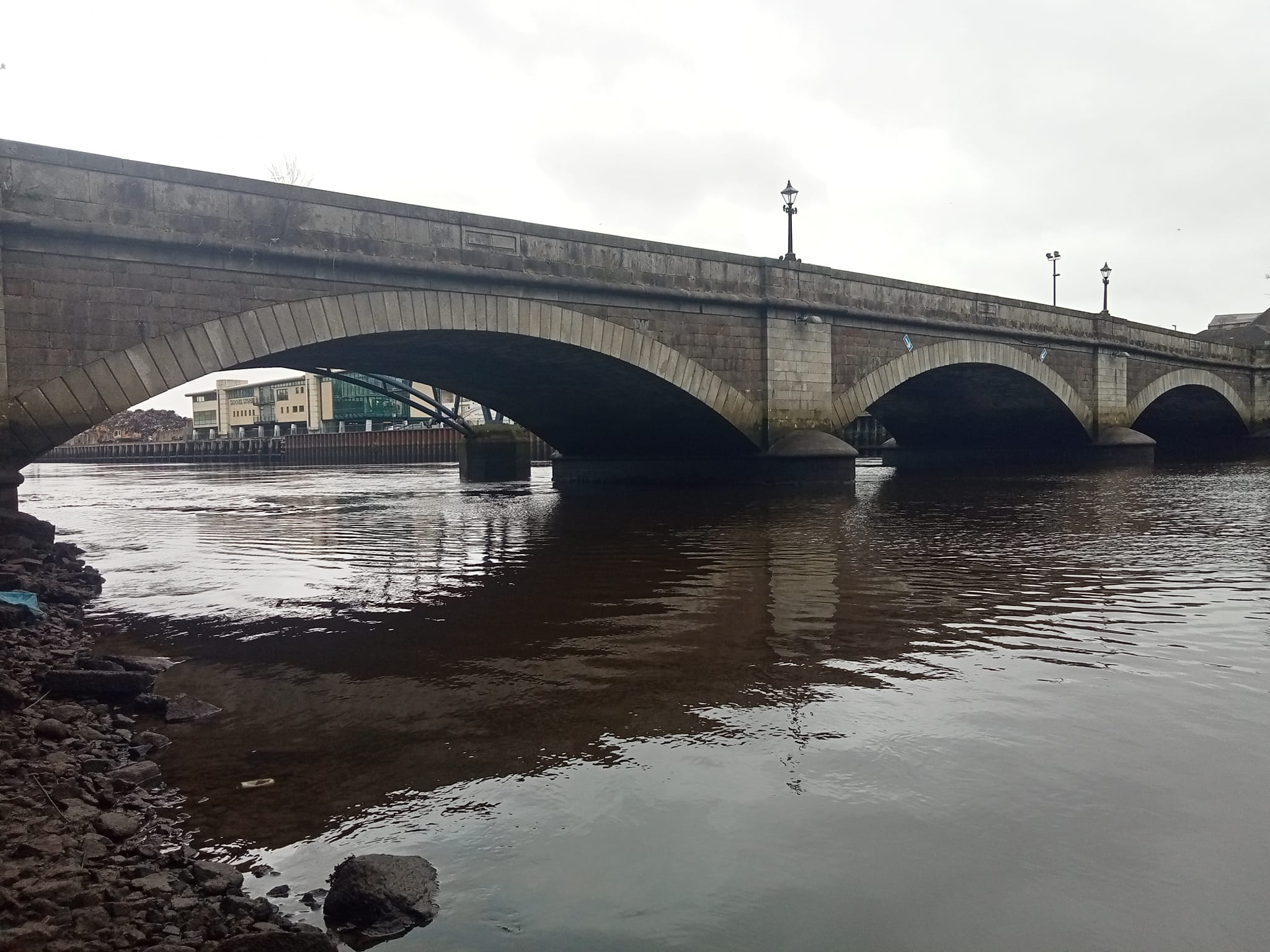
Coleraine Bridge Built 1844

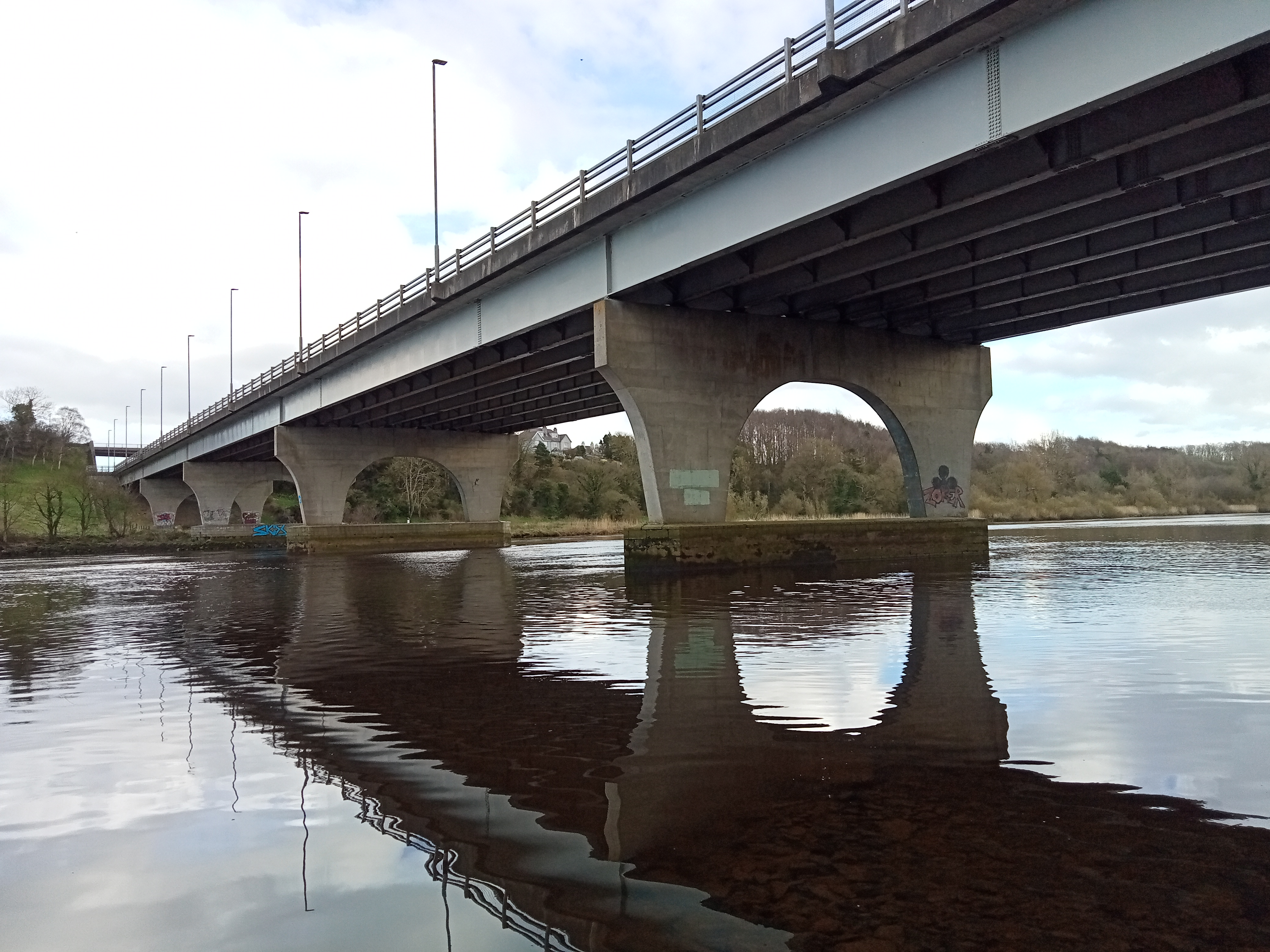
Sandelford Bridge Built 1975

== History ==
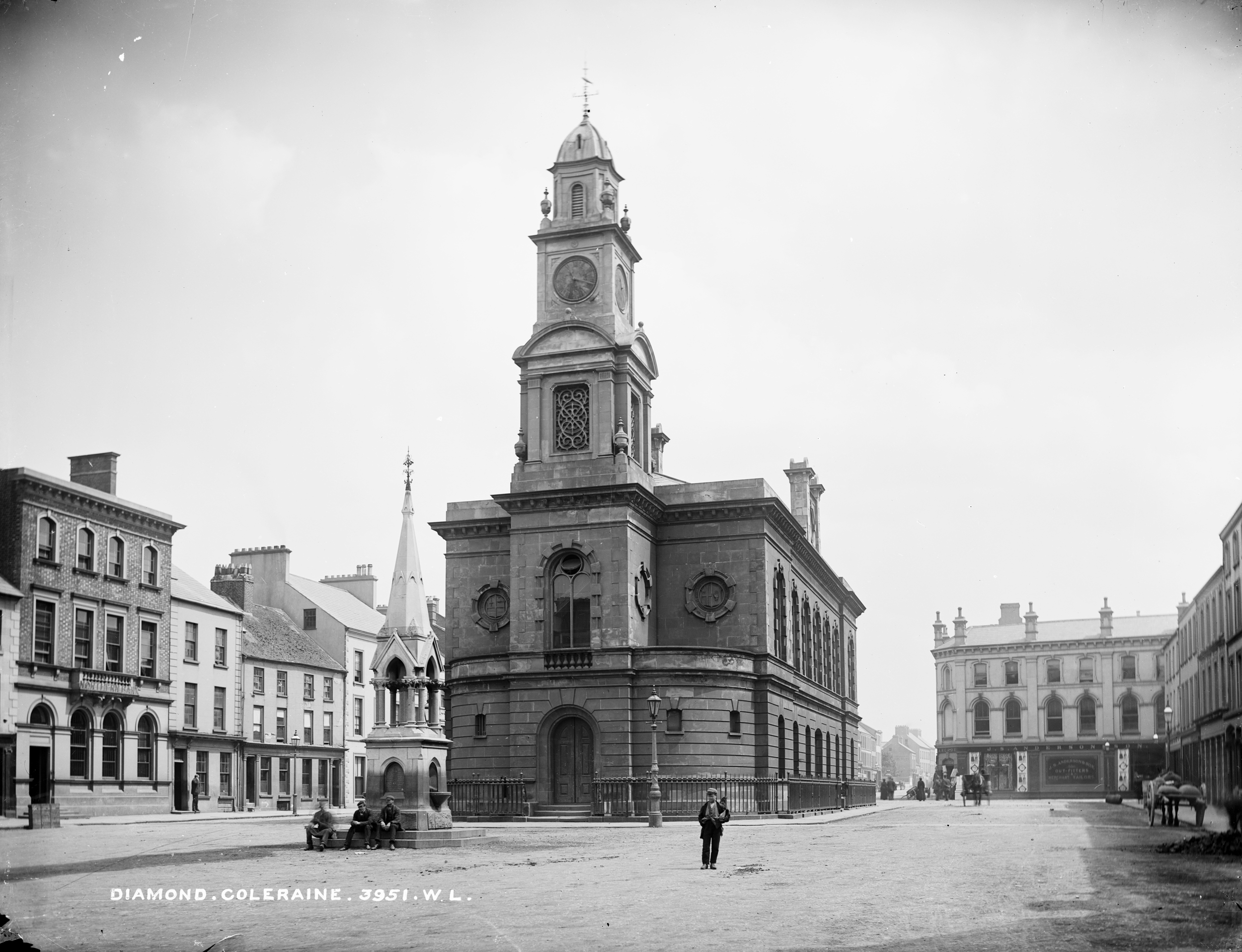
Coleraine c. 1890

=== Neolithic period ===
Coleraine has some of the oldest evidence of human settlement in Ireland. Mount Sandel dates from approximately 5935 BC. The Iron Age souterrain and Ogham Stone and be found just southwest of Coleraine at Dunalis.

=== Early Middle Ages ===
The 9th Century hagiography, Tripartite Life of Saint Patrick, records how the town got its name. When Patrick arrived in the neighbourhood, he was received with great honour and hospitality by the local chieftain, Nadslua, who offered him a piece of ground on which to build a church. The spot was next to the river Bann and was overgrown with ferns, which were being burned by some boys to amuse themselves. This incident led to the area being called Cúil Raithin ('nook of ferns'), which was later anglicised as Coulrath, Colrain, Colerain and Coleraine. It was translated by Colgan into Latin as Secessus Filicis.

The town's main Church of Ireland church, St. Patrick's Church, is named in reference to this history. It was heavily remodelled by the architect Sir Thomas Drew in the 1880s.

=== Ulster Plantation ===
The town was one of the two urban communities developed by the London Companies in County Londonderry in the Plantation of Ulster at the start of the 17th century. In particular, The Honourable the Irish Society was made responsible for much of Coleraine and it remains so today.

The slightly skewed street pattern of Coleraine's town centre is the legacy of that early exercise in town planning, along with traces of the lines of the ramparts that provided the Plantation town with its defences.

=== War of the Two Kings (1689–91) ===
During the War of the Two Kings (1689–91) Coleraine was a centre of Protestant resistance to the rule of James II. Richard Hamilton's Irish Army made an attempt to seize the town but was repulsed. The Protestants were forced to abandon the town shortly afterwards and withdrew to Derry.

Later the same year, following the failed Siege of Derry, Sir Charles Carney and his Jacobite garrison fled the town on receiving news of the advance of Percy Kirke's Enniskillen forces and the landing at Carrickfergus of Marshal Schomberg. The Williamites controlled Coleraine for the remainder of the war.

=== Industrial Era ===
With some industrialisation, the expansion of the river port, and the development of the railway, the town expanded throughout the 19th century.

The population doubled due to a number of factors: major industrial development on extensive suburban sites, including a substantial distillery producing Coleraine Whiskey; the expansion of commerce; and the development of sporting and recreational facilities.

=== World Wars & the 20th Century ===
The town sent soldiers to both world wars. The town's population then expanded significantly after the Second World War.

In 1968 the New University of Ulster opened in the town (later the 'New' was dropped from the name) and became a major employer. The university also attracted students to the area.

There has been a steady expansion of the urban area from the mid-20th-century compact town of less than 2.25 square miles (5.8 km^{2}), to the present much more dispersed area of about 7 square miles (18 km^{2}). Since 1980s growth has continued but at a slightly more modest pace. In the twenty years to 2001 the town's population increased by 22% to approximately 25,000 but the rate of increase fell from 12% in the 1980s to 8% in the 1990s.

=== The Troubles ===
==== Pre-1998 Belfast Agreement ====
During The Troubles 11 people were killed in or near Coleraine prior to 1998.

- On 12 June 1973, the Provisional Irish Republican Army (IRA) detonated a car bomb on Railway Road, with inadequate warning. Six Protestant civilians, all in their sixties and seventies, were killed.
- The second most fatal incident occurred on 2 October 1975 when four members of the Ulster Volunteer Force (UVF) were killed when their own bomb went off as they travelled through Farrenlester near Coleraine.
- Danny Cassidy, a Sinn Féin electoral worker, was shot dead by the Ulster Freedom Fighters in April 1992.

Separately, a non-fatal van bomb was detonated by the IRA on 13 November 1992 in the town centre. It resulted in extensive property damage and several major buildings were demolished. Coleraine Town Hall required major structural work, and was not reopened until August 1995.

==== Post-1998 Belfast Agreement ====
- In 2001 John Henry McCormick (25), who was believed to be Catholic, was killed by loyalist paramilitaries in his home. His partner and children were in the house on the Ballysally estate.
- In 2002 a teenager with no paramilitary connections was killed when he picked up a pipe bomb in the Heights estate in the town.
- In 2009 Kevin McDaid (49), a Catholic community worker, was killed by a loyalist mob in the Heights estate on the Somerset Drive road, a mixed area with tri-colour flags. His wife Evelyn and neighbor Damien were also attacked, along with a pregnant woman who had pleaded with the attackers.

There is reason to believe that there is still substantial sectarian violence and paramilitary activity in Coleraine.

- In 2021, the Police Service of Northern Ireland announced it had set up a special task force due to the rise in paramilitary shootings in the town.
- In 2023, a man in his 30s was shot four times after being hooded and taken out of the town in a planned attack by a gang of masked men.
- In 2024, the Police Service of Northern Ireland appealed for information after shots were fired at a house in the Ballysally estate.

== Geography ==
Coleraine is at the lowest bridgeable point of the River Bann, where the river is 90 metres (300 ft) wide. The town square is called 'The Diamond' and is the location of Coleraine Town Hall. The three bridges in Coleraine are the Sandelford Bridge, Coleraine Bridge and the Bann Bridge.

== Economy ==
Coleraine sits within the second poorest council areas in Northern Ireland, both in terms of relative poverty and absolute poverty.

There are widespread concerns that the high street in Coleraine has seen a steady decline in shops closing.

Historically a number of products were made in the town, such as Coleraine Cheddar and Coleraine Whiskey. However, over the years the production of these goods has moved out of the town:

- Coleraine Cheddar is now made in Portadown;
- Coleraine Whiskey, now made by Irish Distillers in Cork.

=== Transport ===
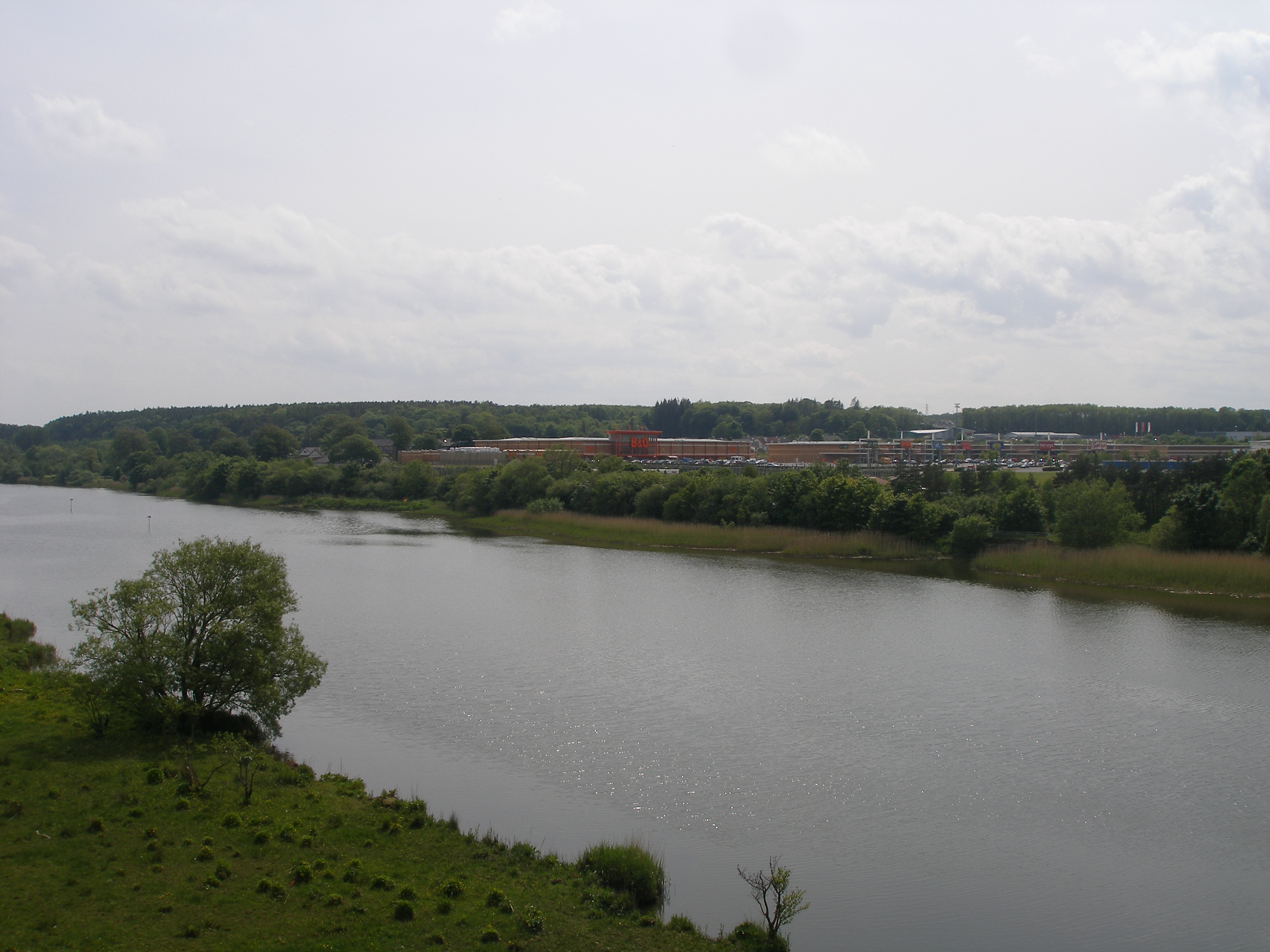
Overlooking the River Bann

Coleraine railway station opened on 4 December 1855 and shares facilities with the town's Ulsterbus bus depot. Passenger service is delivered via the Belfast-Derry railway line along the scenic shore of Lough Foyle and the Coleraine–Portrush branch line. The Belfast–Derry railway line is to be upgraded to facilitate more frequent trains and improvements to the permanent way such as track and signalling to enable faster services.

The railway station was closed for goods traffic on 4 January 1965.

== Demography ==
Coleraine has a population of approximately 25,000 people, making it a relatively small town within the official classification of a 'large town' (i.e. with a population between 18,000 and 75,000 people).

According to the Causeway Coast & Glens Borough Council, the area is the second poorest in Northern Ireland both in terms of relative poverty and absolute poverty. Northern Ireland itself is one of the poorest countries in Europe, therefore Coleraine being one of the poorest parts of NI means many people in the area face substantial deprivation.

Coleraine is home to one of the largest Polish communities in Northern Ireland (Approx. 2% of the Coleraine population are Polish, compared to a NI average of 1.25%).

=== 2021 census ===
On Census day (2021) there were 24,483 people living in Coleraine. Of these:

- 18.78% were aged under 16, 63.25% were aged between 16 and 65, and 17.97% were aged 66 and over.
- 51.88% of the usually resident population were female and 48.11% were male.
- 61.72% are or were brought up Protestant (including other Christian-related denominations), 24.38% are or were brought up Catholic, 1.33% are or were brought up in an 'other' religion, and 12.57% did not adhere to or weren't brought up in any religion.
- 61.91% indicated they had a British national identity, 36.74% indicated they had a Northern Irish national identity, 11.17% indicated they had an Irish national identity, and 8.35% indicated they had an 'other' national identity. (respondents could indicate more than one national identity)
- 15.65% had some knowledge of Ulster Scots and 4.44% had some knowledge of Irish (Gaeilge).

=== Religion ===
Coleraine has considerably more churches per 1,000 people than the average in the UK or the Republic of Ireland:

- St. Patrick's, Church of Ireland (Anglican)
- St. Andrew's, Church of Ireland (Anglican)
- Killowen Parish, Church of Ireland (Anglican)
- St. John's (Roman Catholic)
- St. Malachy's (Roman Catholic)
- 1st Coleraine Presbyterian (Presbyterian)
- Hazelbank Presbyterian Church (Presbyterian)
- Terrace Row (Presbyterian)
- New Row (Presbyterian)
- Ballysally Presbyterian Church (Presbyterian)
- Coleraine Free Presbyterian Church (Free Presbyterian)
- Coleraine Methodist Church (Methodist)
- Coleraine Baptist Church (Baptist)
- Elim Pentecostal Church Coleraine (Pentecostal)
- RCCG KGG (Pentecostal)
- Coleraine Congregational Church (Evangelical)
- Church Of Christ (Evangelical)
- Causeway Coast Vineyard (Evangelical)
- North West Fellowship Church (Evangelical)
- Mountsandel Fellowship Church (Evangelical)
- Coleraine Seventh-day Adventist Church (Seventh-day Adventist)

=== Culture ===
==== Loyalism ====
Coleraine has a broadly loyalist culture, and contains an Orange Hall and several marching bands:

- Coleraine and Casterton Pipes and drums
- Coleraine Fife and Drum Band
- Pride Of The Bann (blood & thunder)

==== Farming & country ====
The town is surrounded by farmland, and there is a significant countryside community. Local venues often organise country music events.

== In literature ==
The poetical illustration The Coleraine Salmon Leap by Letitia Elizabeth Landon, in Fisher's Drawing Room Scrap Book, 1836, refers to an abundance of salmon in the river here in those times, and to a considerable sport derived therefrom. It accompanies an engraving of a painting of the salmon leap by Thomas Mann Baynes.

== Governance ==
Coleraine was the headquarters of the former Coleraine Borough Council In 2015 this was amalgamated under the reform of local government in NI to form the Causeway Coast and Glens District Council, which is now based in the former Coleraine Borough Council headquarters.

The town sits within the East Londonderry constituency for elections to the Westminster Parliament and Northern Ireland Assembly, despite some of the borough being in County Antrim.

== Tourism ==
Coleraine is near the Causeway Coast tourist route, attracting over 2 million annual visitors. A UNESCO World Heritage Site, the Giant's Causeway, is a 25-minute bus ride away. The distillery village of Bushmills is served by buses from the town and there is a narrow-gauge steam train running in the summer from Bushmills to the Giant's Causeway. Also north of Coleraine is the scenic coastal town of Portstewart, with a sandy beach and coastal walks. Portrush is part of the Borough.

North-west of Coleraine lies the small village of Castlerock, with a beach which is essentially a continuation of the beach at Portstewart, separated by the mouth of the River Bann. Also nearby is the beach at Benone Strand and Mussenden Temple, built by Frederick Augustus Hervey, an 18th-century Anglican bishop atop a precipitate cliff and overlooking County Donegal in one direction and Scotland in another. The bishop's residence, Downhill House, which is managed by the National Trust, fell into disrepair after the Second World War.

Coleraine during the day is busy but relatively quiet at night. Much of the nightlife in the area centres on the nearby seaside resort towns of Portrush and Portstewart, with the three towns forming a combined visitor area known as “The Triangle”.

== Climate ==
Coleraine experiences a maritime climate with cool summers and relatively mild winters. The nearest official Met Office weather station for which online records are available is at nearby Coleraine University, about 1 mile (1.6 km) north of the town centre. However, observations ceased a few years ago and the nearest current Met Office weather observing station is at Movanagher, about 12 miles (19 km) to the south. Rainfall at Coleraine typically peaks at over 100 mm (3.9 in) during the month of October. The driest month is May, with an average of under 60 mm (2.4 in). On average, 173 days of the year will report at least 1 mm (0.039 in) of rain, ranging from 18 days in January to 11 days during June. The following table summarises temperature averages sampled between 1971 and 2000.

Climate data for Ulster University, at 23 m.a.s.l. (Weather station 1 mile (2 km) to the North of Coleraine town centre)
Month	Jan	Feb	Mar	Apr	May	Jun	Jul	Aug	Sep	Oct	Nov	Dec	Year
Mean daily maximum °C (°F)	7.3 (45.1)	7.6 (45.7)	9.2 (48.6)	11.1 (52.0)	13.9 (57.0)	15.9 (60.6)	17.8 (64.0)	17.8 (64.0)	15.8 (60.4)	12.9 (55.2)	9.8 (49.6)	8.0 (46.4)	12.3 (54.1)
Mean daily minimum °C (°F)	1.6 (34.9)	1.6 (34.9)	2.8 (37.0)	3.9 (39.0)	6.0 (42.8)	8.7 (47.7)	11.0 (51.8)	10.7 (51.3)	8.8 (47.8)	6.7 (44.1)	3.7 (38.7)	2.4 (36.3)	5.7 (42.2)
Source: yr.no

== Places of interest ==
The east side of the town is distinguished by Mountsandel Forest, which contains the Mount Sandel fort, an ancient site which has been claimed as the oldest site of human settlement in Ireland. Here wooden houses dating from about 7000 BC were uncovered. The fort can be accessed via Mountsandel forest, the closest entrance being the side near the Coleraine Courthouse. There is another fort about two miles south of Mountsandel near the small village of Loughan.

The University of Ulster campus was built in the 1960s and brought a theatrical space to the town in the form of the Riverside Theatre. In 2025, the University of Ulster announced that the theatre would close later in the year, citing funding challenges and a need to focus on core academic activities.

== Notable people ==
=== Living people ===
- Richard Archibald – rower
- Alan Campbell – rower
- Joel Cassells – rower
- Peter Chambers – rower
- Richard Chambers – rower
- Jack Doherty – potter
- Michelle Fairley – actress
- Maureen Madill – golfer, coach and broadcaster
- Jenna McCorkell – British ladies' figure skating champion
- Gerry McKenna – biologist and university vice chancellor
- James Nesbitt – actor
- Maggie O'Farrell – novelist
- Damien O'Kane – folk singer
- Tommy Sheppard – Scottish politician
- Claire Sugden – politician
- Andrew Trimble – rugby union player
- Bronagh Waugh – actress
- Jayne Wisener – actress

=== Historical figures ===
- Hugh Thompson – artist and illustrator
- John Bodkin Adams – general practitioner and suspected serial killer
- Alexander Anderson – physicist
- Daniel Hall Christie - politician
- Peter Dermot Doherty – footballer and manager
- Lewis Thomas Drummond – lawyer, judge, political figure
- Harry Gregg MBE – goalkeeper
- Sam Henry – civil servant, antiquarian, lecturer, writer, photographer, folklorist, and folk-song collector
- A. M. Irvine – author
- Sir Thomas Ranken Lyle – mathematical physicist
- Patrick McGilligan – politician
- Hercules Mulligan – tailor and spy during the American Revolutionary War
- Edward Nicolls – Royal Marines officer
- Bertie Peacock – footballer
- Hilary Stevenson – scientist, educator, and expert on food irradiation
- Isaac Todd – fur trader and merchant
- Charles Frederick Williams – journalist and war correspondent
- Edmund Mackenzie Young – Australian banker, financier/investor and grazier

== Education ==
Coleraine has a variety of educational institutions at all levels.

=== Primary ===
- Saint John's Primary School
- Irish Society's Primary School (see The Honourable The Irish Society)
- D.H. Christie Memorial Primary School
- Killowen Primary School
- Macosquin Primary School
- Harpurs Hill Primary School, Est Jan 1971.
- Millburn Primary School, Est 1956.
- Saint Malachy's Primary School
- Ballysally Primary School

=== Special schools ===
- Sandelford Special School

=== Secondary ===
- Coleraine Grammar School (member of the prestigious HMC).
- St Joseph's College, Coleraine (closed 2019)
- Loreto College, Coleraine
- Coleraine College*
- North Coast Integrated College*

*Planned merger.

=== Tertiary ===
Coleraine is the location of a University of Ulster campus and houses the university's administration buildings. It is the original campus of what was the New University of Ulster (established in 1968) which merged with the former Ulster Polytechnic at Jordanstown just north of Belfast in 1984 to form the present-day institution. The university was placed in the top five of UK universities by the 2014 Research Excellence Framework for its law, biomedical, and humanities programs. The Causeway Institute is a College of Further and Higher Education based in Coleraine, with another campus in nearby Ballymoney.

== Sport ==
Coleraine has a number of sports clubs and facilities.

=== Coleraine F.C. ===
Coleraine F.C., established in 1927 and currently in the IFA Premiership and CLG Eoghan Rua established in 1957. Coleraine is one of the hosting towns for the Milk Cup.

The club has long been associated with the loyalist side of the community and in 2024 the club was reported to the IFA league for playing sectarian songs.^{,}

==== Coleraine Rugby Football & Cricket Club ====
Situated near the Lodge Road and Mountsandel areas. Coleraine Rugby Club was established in 1921. It is co-located with Coleraine Cricket Club, which plays in the North West Senior League.

==== Motorbike racing ====
Coleraine is part of the circuit for the North West 200, a series of motorcycle road races organised by the Coleraine and District Motor Club.

==== Other ====
Coleraine Bowling Club is a lawn bowls club on Lodge Road and was founded in 1903. Coleraine is one of the most successful teams in the NIPBA and Irish bowling, with 64 titles on the honours list. The Bannsiders have claimed two Irish Bowling Association Senior Challenge Cup victories, in 1921 and 2013. Coleraine have also provided a number of international players and Commonwealth Games representatives, most notably Victor Dallas and Roy Fulton.

The Coleraine area has a number of equestrian facilities. These include RDA Coleraine (Riding for the Disabled Association - Coleraine & District Group), which provides riding opportunities for people with a physical and/or learning disability at their £1.75 million RDA Causeway Coast Arena at Castleroe. This arena was funded by SportNI, Coleraine Borough Council, and by donations from the people of the district. The conditions of grant aid included the provision of a sporting arena for RDA, the equestrian fraternity, and other sporting activities.

== Other places internationally ==
A number of places have taken their name from Coleraine:

=== Canada ===
- In Quebec, Canada, the municipality of Saint-Joseph-de-Coleraine in the Appalachian region perpetuates the hometown of Irish settlers who arrived starting in 1864.
- Coleraine, Ontario. It is possible this name is based on two settling families in the region, the Coles and the Raines.

=== United States ===
In the US, the spelling 'Colerain' is occasionally substituted.

- Coleraine, Georgia.
- Colerain Township, Belmont County, Ohio.
- Colerain Township, Hamilton County, Ohio.
- Colerain Township, Ross County, Ohio.
- Coleraine, North Carolina.
- Colerain Township, Lancaster County, Pennsylvania.
- Colerain Township, Bedford County, Pennsylvania
- Coleraine, Minnesota. It is possible this name is based on a local businessman.

=== Australia ===
- Coleraine, Victoria. In 1853, a surveyor named Lindsay Clarke was working on a township called Bryans Creek Crossing in Victoria, Australia. He renamed the town Coleraine.

== International relations ==
International projects, under the guidance of Coleraine Borough Council, include the Zomba Action Project – a charity founded in 2003 to provide aid to the municipality of Zomba in southern Malawi. The region was chosen due to the historical connections between the Presbyterian and Catholic churches and Malawi, sustained by a number of specific local contacts. Donations have been used to fund computers, education, medical and other projects.

Coleraine is twinned with the French town of La Roche-sur-Yon.

== See also ==
- County Coleraine
- List of civil parishes of County Londonderry
- List of localities in Northern Ireland by population
- List of towns and villages in Northern Ireland
- O'Cahan
