= Causeway Institute =

Educational institution in Northern Ireland

Coordinates: 55.135°N 6.666°W

Logo

The Causeway Institute of Further and Higher Education (informally Causeway Institute or CIFHE) was a third-level educational institution in Northern Ireland, United Kingdom. The Causeway Institute was located on two campuses: Coleraine, County Londonderry and Ballymoney, County Antrim.

== History ==
The Institute came into being in September 1994 as a result of the merger of two former technical colleges: Coleraine Technical College and the North Antrim College in Ballymoney. In 2007, the institute became part of the newly formed Northern Regional College. NRC was set up following a review of further education in Northern Ireland. By 2007, the Institute had a full-time student population of 1,100 and 5,500 students taking part-time courses. Before the merger, the institute was a recognised Investor in People and accredited as a Cisco Networking Academy, ECDL Centre and ILM Centre. The College rugby team was ranked within the top eight Colleges and Universities in Ireland.
