= St. Patrick's Church, Coleraine =

Historic church in Coleraine, Northern Ireland

Coordinates: 55°07′56″N 6°40′07″W

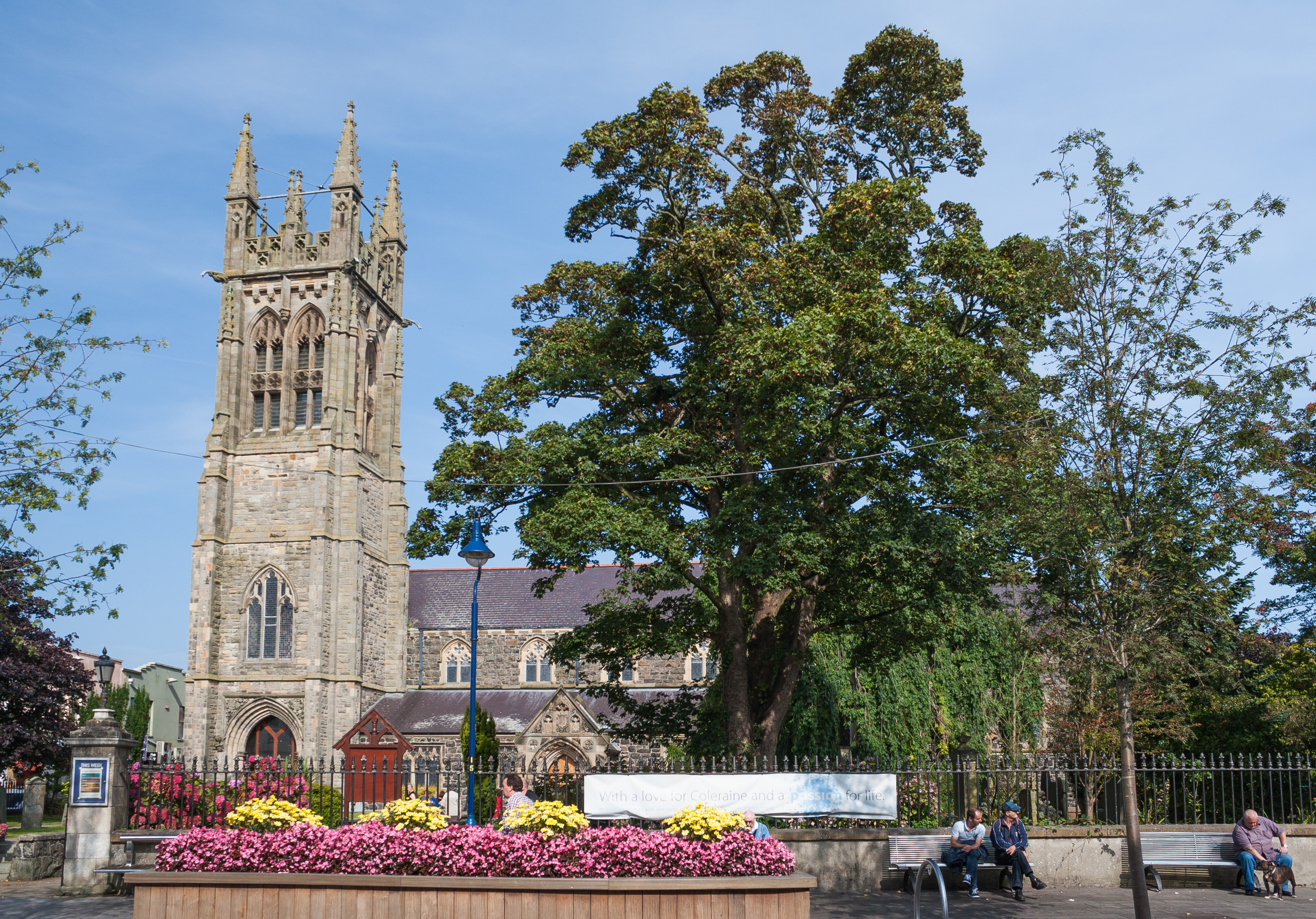
- Coleraine St Patrick's Church in 2014
- Denomination: Anglican (Church of Ireland)
- Website: https://stpats.co.uk/

History
- Founder(s): St. Patrick

Administration
- Diocese: Diocese of Connor

St. Patrick's Church is a Church of Ireland parish church within the Diocese of Connor. Located in the town of Coleraine in Northern Ireland, it is protected as a Grade B+ listed building.

== History ==
St. Patrick’s Church is said to have been established by St. Patrick, after a local chieftain offered him a site for a church on the north bank of the River Bann in the 5th century. Patrick is said to have chosen a spot covered in ferns, giving rise to the name Cuil Raithin (or 'ferny retreat') which became the name of the town of Coleraine. A church is known to have existed on the site from at least the medieval period.

== Architecture ==
The building was remodelled in a Victorian Gothic Revival style with elements of detailing which include some examples of Celtic Revival devices, such as the application of shamrock motifs, by architect Sir Thomas Drew between 1883 and 1885.^{,}
