= Thomas Drew (architect) =

Irish architect (1838–1910)

Sir Thomas Drew
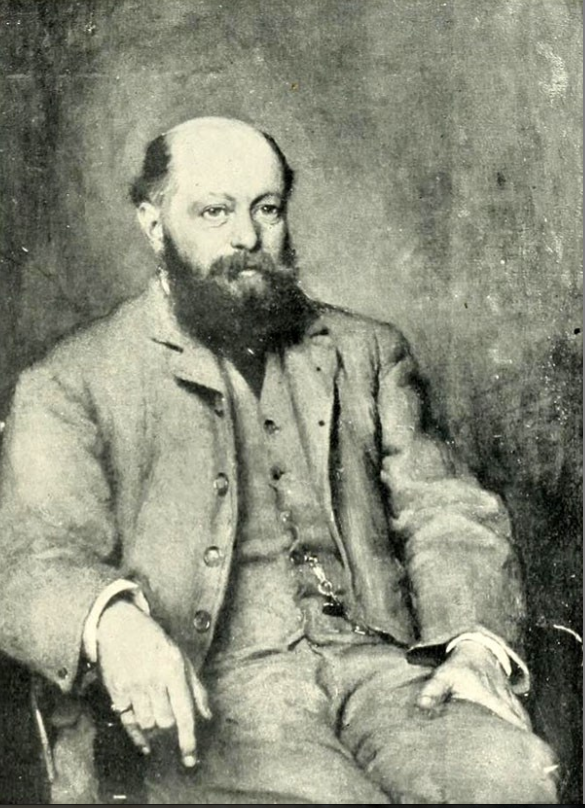
- Born: 18 September 1838; Victoria Place, Belfast, Ireland
- Died: 13 March 1910 (aged 71); Dublin
- Resting place: Deans Grange Cemetery
- Parent(s): Thomas and Isabella Drew

Sir Thomas Drew (18 September 1838 – 13 March 1910) was an Anglo-Irish architect.

== Life ==
Thomas Drew was born in Victoria Place, Belfast. He was the son of the Rev. Thomas Drew and Isabella (née Dalton) Drew. He was one of four sons and eight daughters of the couple, although most of the children died young. His sister, Catherine Drew, was a journalist and writer.

He was trained under Sir Charles Lanyon before moving to work in Dublin, where he became principal assistant to William George Murray. In 1865, he became the diocesan architect of the united dioceses of Down, Connor and Dromore in 1865, and from then on, Church architecture was Drew's principal activity. He was the consulting architect for both St Patrick's Cathedral and Christ Church Cathedral in Dublin.

He married Adelaide Anne, the sister of William George Murray, in 1871.

Among other projects, he was responsible for the design of the Ulster Bank on Dame Street, Rathmines Town Hall (completed 1899), and the Graduates' Building at Trinity College. He took an interest in historic buildings and was the first to draw serious attention to the architectural and historic importance of the St Audoen's Church, Dublin's oldest parish church, in 1866. He produced detailed plans of the church for which he won an award from the RIAI, carried out excavations and drew up a paper on the church and its history.

From 1885 to 1892, Richard Orpen worked with him as a managing assistant. Drew's most significant work in Belfast was St Anne's Cathedral, completed in 1899.

== Honours/affiliations ==
He was knighted in the 1900 Birthday Honours and was inaugural president of the Royal Society of Ulster Architects, serving from 1901 to 1903. In addition, he was president of the Royal Institute of the Architects of Ireland (RIAI), the Royal Society of Antiquaries of Ireland (RSAI) and the Royal Hibernian Academy (RHA) and held the chair in architecture at the National University of Ireland. He lived in Gortnadrew, Monkstown, Dublin.

In February 1910, he underwent an operation for appendicitis, which left him in a critical condition, and he died on 13 March 1910. He was buried in Deans Grange Cemetery.

== Selected works ==
- Christ Church, Kilmore, County Down, 1868-1870. (Last 'Established' church built in Ireland)
- Christ Church, Ballyculter, County Down - renovations & rebuilding, 1880-1882
- Holy Trinity, Seapatrick, County Down - complete rebuild, 1882
- St. Patrick's Church, Coleraine, County Londonderry - renovations & rebuilding, 1883-1885
- St Anne's Cathedral, Belfast (original design), 1899-1904, completed 2007
- Graduates Memorial Building, Trinity College, Dublin, 1899-1902

Preceded by Inaugural President	RSUA President; 1901–1903	Succeeded by WJ Gilliland
