= Bee rustling =

Theft of honey bees

Bee rustling is the term for theft of honey bees, analogous to cattle rustling. It has been reported in Western Canada, the Western United States, and the United Kingdom. A 2014 theft in California was valued at US$65,000, and a December 2016 theft of 300 bee colonies in Texas was valued at $90,000. Bees and honey worth $100,000 were stolen from a farm in Abbotsford, British Columbia in 2012. The California State Beekeepers Association offers a $10,000 reward for information resulting in the arrest and conviction of a bee rustler.

Modern Farmer, The Guardian and others ascribe the increase in this crime to higher honeybee values after colony collapse disorders started c. 2006.

== See also ==
- Horse theft
