= Rustlers (convenience food) =

Hamburgers and sandwiches made by Kepak

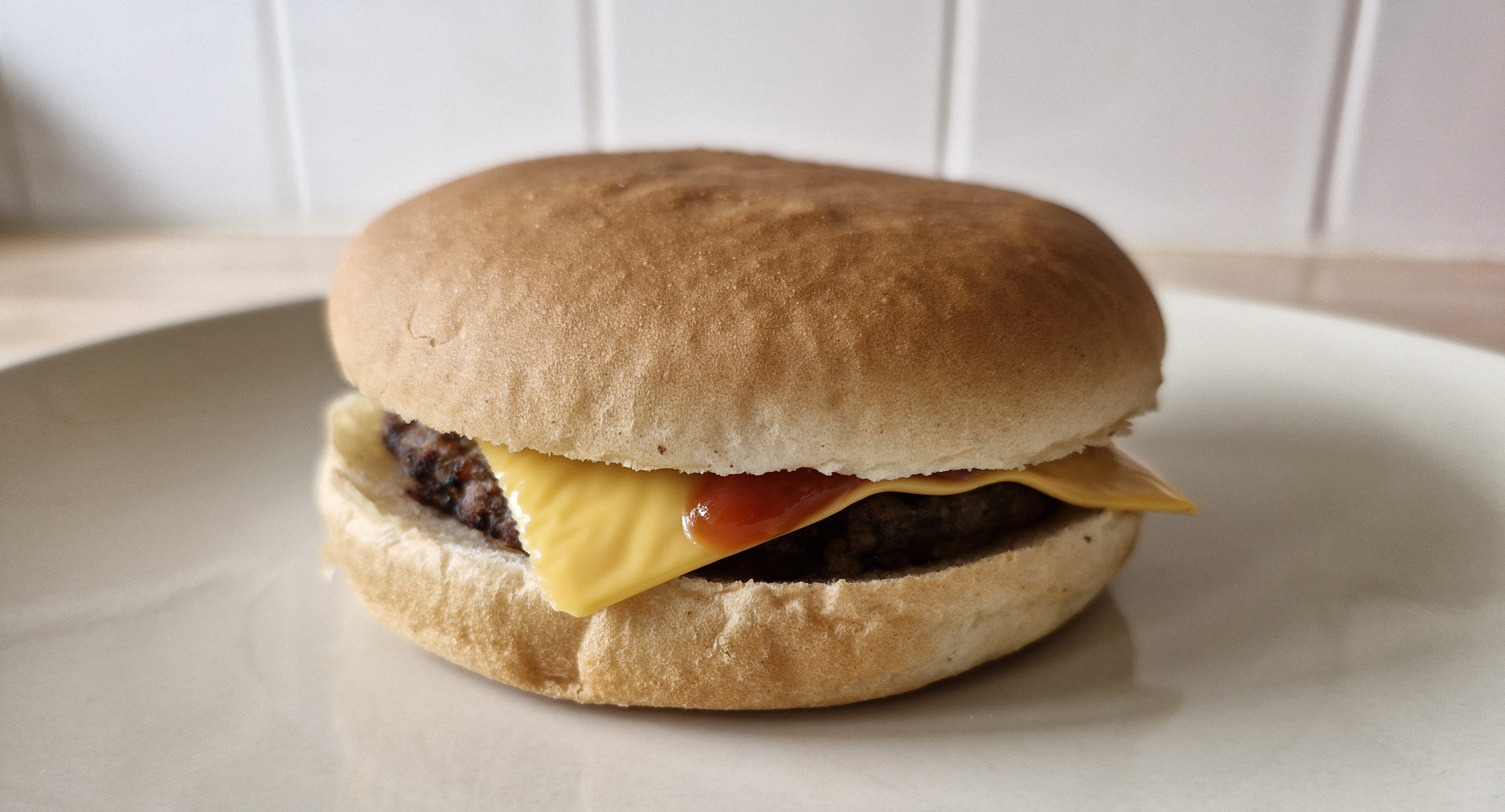
Photograph of a cheeseburger produced by Rustlers, prepared according to packaging instructions.

Rustlers is a range of prepackaged hamburgers and hot sandwiches made by Kepak, a company based in Dublin, Ireland. Some products in the range come packed with a sachet of sauce appropriate for the food. Several products are now also packaged with a slice of processed cheese and/or a rasher of bacon.

== Marketing ==
One focus of the marketing is on the short cooking time and the use of a microwave oven to heat the food. However, one could also toast the bun and microwave the patty separately, cook it in a conventional oven or an air fryer.

According to a 2008 article in The Independent, the brand's early marketing campaigns were aimed at young men who may prefer convenience food. This can be seen in marketing involving desirable young women, and the original television advert involving young men taking modified microwaves to "cruise" style events.

In 2012, two online adverts for the brand were banned by the ASA because they were sexually provocative.

In 2020, the brand launched a new marketing campaign claiming to be "better than you think", stating Rustlers microwaveable burgers are made of 100% British and Irish beef.

== Products ==
Rustlers manufacture several products including cheeseburgers and chicken burgers. In 2018, Rustlers launched an all day breakfast sausage muffin. As of February 2025, other products such as hotdogs and pancakes are also available.

=== Meat-free products ===
In 2019, with a target audience of 18- to 24-year-olds, Kepak launched its first Rustlers vegetarian burger, a Moroccan felafel patty, named on the packet as "Moroccan vegetarian burger, carrot & coriander falafel with mango chutney and yogurt and mint sauce". In November 2021 in Tesco, Tesco One Stop and Booker outlets, Kepak launched the Rustlers Meatless Maverick, a meat-free burger. However, although the burger is made from pea protein, a cheese slice is included in the pack, so that the package is not wholly plant-based or vegan. It was designed in 2021 to mimic the brand's Quarter Pounder SKU, and to be sold at the same price as the Rustlers original meat-based burgers.

In September 2022 in Tesco, Kepak launched the Meatless Maverick Chick’un Fillet, consisting of a plant-based chicken-style fillet with vegan mayonnaise in a soft seeded roll.

== Eat Late Eat Safe campaign ==
In 2007 the brand became associated with the "Eat Late Eat Safe" campaign. This is an effort by UK fire services to spread awareness about the dangers of cooking while under the influence of alcohol, particularly aimed at university students. The brand is particularly suitable for this purpose because of its reliance on microwave ovens, which are generally regarded as less likely to cause fires. Rustlers' involvement in the cause involves a section linking to the campaign's site on its own website, and the distribution of free samples and money-off coupons during a tour of UK universities. The campaign's awareness leaflets are given out with the samples and coupons.
