= Ulster University at Coleraine =

Campus of the University of Ulster

Ulster University Coleraine campus
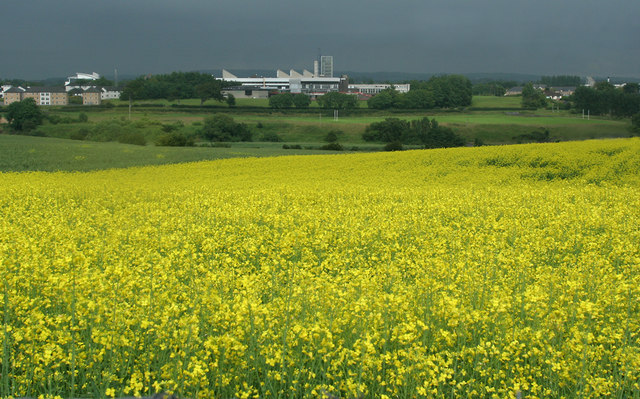
- The Coleraine Campus in 2007
- Type: Public research university
- Established: 1968 – New University of Ulster established at Coleraine; 1982 – Ulster Polytechnic merger; University of Ulster established
- Affiliations: Ulster University
- Endowment: £6.483 million (2014)
- Budget: £185m
- Chancellor: Colin Davidson
- Vice-Chancellor: Paul Bartholomew
- Students: 4,180 (2022/23)
- Location: Coleraine, County Londonderry, Northern Ireland; 55°8′52″N 6°40′20″W
- Colours: Logo:Navy blue & Bronze Seal:Red & Gold Formerly:Navy blue, Blue & Green
- Website: www.ulster.ac.uk Coleraine campus

Ulster University's campus in Coleraine, County Londonderry, Northern Ireland houses the administrative headquarters of the university. It is the most traditional in outlook, with a focus on science and the humanities. It was founded in 1968 as the New University of Ulster and was later known as the University of Ulster at Coleraine until October 2014 when it was rebranded with the rest of the university as Ulster University. The Coleraine campus is situated on the banks of the River Bann in Coleraine with views to the Causeway Coast and the hills of County Donegal to the West.

== History ==
See also University of Ulster history

Originally, the concept of a new university was well received by many nationalists in Northern Ireland. This was due to a feeling of bias that unionist communities, or towns, received better facilities and investment. As a result, the initial desire of nationalists was to form a new university institution at the already well established Magee College in Derry, a predominantly nationalist community. Some thought at the time that the reasoning for establishing the university in Coleraine over Derry was a desire to pull population towards the East of Northern Ireland as the university would strengthen the 'Belfast-Coleraine-Portadown' economic triangle, which happened to form the edge of the nationalist/unionist communities.

It was suggested that this was part of a unionist agenda by Terence O'Neill, the then Prime Minister of Northern Ireland, to draw nationalist communities from the West into the East and to help break them up. There was no substantial evidence to back up this claim, however it was the idea that led to a number of protests and rallying in opposition. As violent protests continued, the result was that the recommendation of the Lockwood Report (named after the chairman of the committee which produced it, Sir John Francis Lockwood, Master of Birkbeck College, London and former Vice-Chancellor of the University of London) was accepted by vote. The Troubles began shortly afterwards, and resulted in O'Neill leaving the office of Prime Minister, allegedly after being forced to resign.

The campus was founded as the New University of Ulster in 1968 as Northern Ireland's second university, its establishment being inspired by the 1965 Lockwood Report. In 1969, Magee College was incorporated into the university, making Coleraine the primary campus of a multi-centre university. After the university opened it was decided that students at Magee College studying their degrees would not transfer to Coleraine as they had previously done after two years of study with Trinity College Dublin.

To meet demand, subjects like French and German were offered in a separate subject called West European Studies. A number of other similar arts subjects were intended to commence at Coleraine, such as East European Studies, Irish Studies, Asian Studies and American Studies. These subject areas typically included history, two or more languages, social sciences and geography. However, these subject areas were never fully developed and were offered only as short courses. However, individual subjects in Asian and American Literature and History were developed.

In 1984, Coleraine retained the headquarters role in a merger with the Ulster Polytechnic at Jordanstown.

== Campus ==
The campus is situated on 300 acres (1.2 km^{2}) of parklands with landscaped grounds that include tranquil garden areas and a well-developed arboretum. Within this most attractive landscape lie up-to-date, custom-built facilities for teaching, learning and research. These core activities are supported by extensive residential, catering, and sporting facilities; the Riverside Theatre, Coleraine, the third-largest professionally built theatre in Northern Ireland, operated on the campus until its closure in 2025. The current Provost is Professor Karise Hutchinson.

The campus currently has over 5,050 students (undergraduate and postgraduate, and full-time and part-time) and around 1,300 employees, making it by far the largest economic and institutional entity in the north of the province.

== See also ==
- Causeway Institute
- University for Derry Committee
- Coleraine Cluster
