= 2012–13 FAI Intermediate Cup =

Tournament details
- Country: Ireland
- Teams: 94

Final positions
- Champions: Avondale United
- Runners-up: Bluebell United

The 2012–13 Umbro FAI Intermediate Cup was the 86th season of the tournament's existence. 94 clubs competed to win the title. Avondale United were the defending champions having beaten Cherry Orchard the previous season to gain their fifth Intermediate Cup title. The 16 teams that reached the fourth round of the competition would qualify for the 2013 FAI Cup.

== First round ==
Intermediate teams from the Leinster Senior League, Munster Senior League and Ulster Senior League enter at this stage. In this round teams from the Leinster Senior League play each other, teams from the Munster Senior League play each other, and teams from the Ulster Senior League play each other. The draw was made on 4 September 2012 with ties to be played on the weekend of 30 September 2012. Extra-time and penalties will be played if necessary.

=== Ulster ===
30 September 2012	Cockhill Celtic	4 - 1	Letterkenny Rovers	Charlie O'Donnell Sports Grounds

30 September 2012	Kildrum Tigers	1 - 0	Fanad United	Station Road Park

Byes:

- Bonagee United
- Buncrana Hearts
- Drumkeen United
- Swilly Rovers

=== Munster ===
30 September 2012	Ballinhassig	0 - 5	College Corinthians	Gortnaglocha

30 September 2012	Carrigaline United	1 - 2	Fermoy	Ballea Park

30 September 2012	UCC	1 - 0	Wilton United	The Farm

30 September 2012	Cobh Wanderers	0 - 2	Avondale United	Oldchurch

30 September 2012	Mallow United	4 - 0	Passage	Mallow Town Park

30 September 2012	Glasheen	0 - 1	Crofton Celtic	Glasheen Park

30 September 2012	Casement Celtic	0 - 4	Douglas Hall	Casement Park

2 October 2012	Rockmount	1 - 0	Leeds	Rockmount Park

14 October 2012	Cork Institute of Technology	0 - 1	Everton	CIT Grounds

Byes:

- Ballincollig
- Bandon
- Blarney United
- Castleview
- Crosshaven
- Kinsale
- Leeside
- Mayfield United
- Midleton
- Ringmahon Rangers
- St. Mary's
- Tramore Athletic
- Youghal United

=== Leinster ===
30 September 2012	Templeogue United	1 - 2	Dunboyne	Tymon Park

30 September 2012	Tolka Rovers	0 - 0 (a.e.t.) (3 - 1 p)	Firhouse Clover	Frank Cooke Park

30 September 2012	Skerries Town	2 - 8	Cherry Orchard	Park Lane

30 September 2012	Malahide United	2 - 4	Bangor Celtic	Gannon Park

30 September 2012	Greystones	4 - 2	Peamount Moyle Park	Archfield

30 September 2012	Garda	2 - 1	Ballyfermot United	St. Raphael's Park

30 September 2012	Whitehall Rangers	0 - 1	Lucan United	Paddy Mahony park

30 September 2012	St. Joseph's Seniors	3 - 4	UCD Reserves	Pearse Park, Sallynoggin

30 September 2012	Beggsboro	8 - 4	Edenderry Town	Kilkiernan Road

30 September 2012	Belgrove/Home Farm	3 - 1	Drogheda Town	St. Pauls College

30 September 2012	Pegasus/St. James Athletic	2 - 1	Wicklow Rovers	Belfield Park

30 September 2012	Newtown Rangers	2 - 2 (a.e.t.) (4-5 p)	Glenville	Farrell Park, Kiltipper

30 September 2012	Portmarnock	1 - 3	St. Patrick's C.Y.F.C.	Paddy's Hill

30 September 2012	Bluebell United	4 - 2	Arklow Town	Caplo Park

30 September 2012	T.E.K. United	2 - 1	Drumcondra	Deansgrange

30 September 2012	Sacred Heart	1 - 2	Phoenix F.C.	Killinarden Park

30 September 2012	Glebe North Athletic	2 - 4 (a.e.t.)	Mount Merrion YMCA	Market Green, Balbriggan

30 September 2012	CYM Terenure	1 - 6	Postal United	CYM Sports Club

30 September 2012	Greystones United	3 - 1	St. Francis	Greystones Town Council Grounds

2 October 2012	Wayside Celtic	5 - 1	Dublin Bus	Jackson Park

Byes:

- Broadford Rovers
- Celbridge Town
- Confey
- Crumlin United
- Glenmore Dundrum
- Killester United
- Kilmanagh
- Leixlip United
- Newbridge Town
- Parkvilla
- Rathcoole Boys
- Ratoath Harps
- St. James Gate
- St. Mochtas
- Tymon Celtic
- Verona

== Second round ==
In this round teams from the winners of the first round from the Leinster Senior League play each other, Munster Senior League play each other, and teams from the Ulster Senior League play each other. The draw was made on 3 October 2012 with ties to be played on the weekend of 28 October 2012. Extra-time and penalties will be played if necessary.

=== Ulster ===
28 October 2012	Kildrum Tigers	0 - 2	Buncrana Hearts	Station Road Park

28 October 2012	Swilly Rovers	3 - 1	Drumkeen United	Swilly Park

28 October 2012	Cockhill Celtic	4 - 1	Bonagee United	Charlie O'Donnell Sports Grounds

=== Munster ===
28 October 2012	Avondale United	2 - 0	Fermoy	Avondale Park

28 October 2012	Ringmahon Rangers	2 - 2 (a.e.t.) (4 - 2 p)	Crofton Celtic	Ringmahon Park

28 October 2012	Crosshaven	2 - 3	Leeside	Camden

28 October 2012	Everton	3 - 0	Tramore Athletic	Everton Park

28 October 2012	Youghal United	1 - 2	St. Mary's	Ardrath Park

28 October 2012	Mallow United	0 - 1	Bandon	Mallow Town Park

28 October 2012	UCC	6 - 1	Ballincollig	The Farm

28 October 2012	Midleton	1 - 2 (a.e.t.)	Blarney United	Knockgriffin

28 October 2012	Douglas Hall	2 - 1	Kinsale	Moneygourney

28 October 2012	Mayfield United	0 - 3	College Corinthians	Mayfield Park

31 October 2012	Rockmount	2 - 0	Castleview	Rockmount Park

=== Leinster ===
26 October 2012	Greystones United	2 – 1 (abandoned*)	Lucan United	Greystones Town Council Grounds

9 November 2012 Rematch	Greystones United	1 - 0	Lucan United	Greystones Town Council Grounds

28 October 2012	St. Patrick's C.Y.F.C.	2 - 0 (a.e.t.)	Wayside Celtic	Irishtown Stadium

28 October 2012	Greystones	0 - 1	Verona	Archfield

28 October 2012	St. James Gate	1 - 2	Killester United	Iveagh Grounds

28 October 2012	Broadford Rovers	1 - 3	Cherry Orchard	Stonemasons Way, Ballinteer

28 October 2012	Tolka Rovers	2 - 0	Crumlin United	Frank Cooke Park

28 October 2012	Kilmanagh	1 - 1 (a.e.t.) (2 - 4 p)	T.E.K. United	Treepark Road

28 October 2012	UCD Reserves	3 - 0	Ratoath Harps	Belfield Park

28 October 2012	Dunboyne	0 - 1	Tymon Celtic	Summerhill Road, Dunboyne

28 October 2012	Celbridge Town	1 - 5	Beggsboro	St. Patricks Park, Celbridge

28 October 2012	Bluebell United	2 - 2 (a.e.t.) (5 - 4 p)	Belgrove/Home Farm	Caplo Park

28 October 2012	Mount Merrion YMCA	1 - 4	Phoenix F.C.	MM Grounds, Glenabbey Road

28 October 2012	St Mochtas	1 - 2	Pegasus/St James Athletic	Porterstown Road

28 October 2012	Parkvilla	2 - 0	Garda	Claremont Stadium, Navan

28 October 2012	Confey	2 - 3	Glenville	St. Catherine's Park, Leixlip

28 October 2012	Postal United	1 - 3	Leixlip United	Andy Moore Park

28 October 2012	Bangor Celtic	3 - 1	Rathcoole Boys	Nutgrove NS Grounds

9 November 2012	Glenmore Dundrum	1 - 2	Newbridge Town	Moreen Park

* The match was abandoned when a Lucan United player was seriously injured. Greystones United were leading 2-1 at the time.

== Third round ==
The draw for this round was made on 6 November 2012 by the FAI Domestic Committee. Ties are to be played on the weekend on 2 December. In this round teams from the Leinster Senior League, Munster Senior League, Ulster Senior League play each other. The 16 winners of the Third Round ties will progress to the Fourth round and also qualify for the 2013 FAI Cup. If ties end in a draw after 90 minutes, a replay will be played in which the away side from the first match will have home advantage. In the replay if it remains a draw, extra-time will be played and if required, penalties.

30 November 2012	Tolka Rovers	2 - 2	T.E.K. United	Frank Cooke Park
19:45

6 January 2013 Replay	T.E.K. United	0 - 2	Tolka Rovers	Deansgrange
13:00

30 November 2012	Leixlip United	2 - 1	UCD Reserves	Leixlip Amenities Center
19:45

30 November 2012	Greystones United	1 - 1	Beggsboro	Woodlands
20:00

14 December 2012 Replay	Beggsboro	2 - 0	Greystones United	Kilkiernan Road
19:45

1 December 2012	Ringmahon Rangers	1 - 2	Bandon	Ringmahon Park
14:00

1 December 2012	Buncrana Hearts	1 - 2	Newbridge Town	Maginn Park
17:00

2 December 2012	Glenville	3 - 0	Leeside	Oakcourt Avenue, Palmerstown
11:00

2 December 2012	Bangor Celtic	2 - 0	UCC	Iveagh Grounds
12:00

2 December 2012	College Corinthians	2 - 1	Pegasus/St James Athletic	Corinthians Park
14:00

2 December 2012	Cherry Orchard	0 - 2	Avondale United	Elmdale
14:00

2 December 2012	St. Patrick's C.Y.F.C.	1 - 0	Rockmount	Irishtown Stadium
14:00

2 December 2012	Killester United	0 - 1	St. Mary's	Haddon Park
14:00

2 December 2012	Cockhill Celtic	3 - 5	Everton	Charlie O'Donnell Sports Grounds
14:00

2 December 2012	Phoenix F.C.	5 - 0	Swilly Rovers	Martin Savage Park
14:00

2 December 2012	Douglas Hall	1 - 2	Bluebell United	Moneygourney
14:00

2 December 2012	Verona	1 - 1	Parkvilla	Verona Sports and Leisure Club, Blanchardstown
14:00

16 December 2012 Replay	Parkvilla	3 - 2	Verona	Claremont Stadium, Navan
14:00

9 December 2012	Tymon Celtic	0 - 2	Blarney United	Roadstone
14:00

== Fourth round ==
The draw for this round was made on 4 December 2012 by the FAI Domestic Committee. The teams that have made it to the Fourth round have qualified for the 2013 FAI Cup. If ties end in a draw after 90 minutes, a replay will be played in which the away side from the first match will have home advantage. In the replay if it remains a draw, extra-time will be played and if required, penalties. Parkvilla are the lowest ranked team remaining in the competition, playing in the 4th tier of the Leinster Senior League.

25 January 2013	St. Patrick's C.Y.F.C.	1 – 1	Bangor Celtic	Irishtown Stadium
19:45

13 February 2013 Replay *	St. Patrick's C.Y.F.C.	1 - 2	Bangor Celtic	Irishtown Stadium
20:00

27 January 2013	Bluebell United	2 - 0	Bandon	Caplo Park
11:00

27 January 2013	Tolka Rovers	3 - 0	Blarney United	Frank Cooke Park
14:00

27 January 2013	Phoenix F.C. Navan Road	5 - 0	Everton	Martin Savage Park
14:00

27 January 2013	Leixlip United	3 - 0	St. Mary's	Leixlip Amenities Center
14:00

8 February 2013	Newbridge Town	0 - 0	Parkvilla	Station Road, Newbridge
19:45

15 February 2013 Replay	Parkvilla	2 - 1	Newbridge Town	Claremont Stadium, Navan
19:45

10 February 2013	Avondale United	2 - 0	College Corinthians	Avondale Park
11:00

15 February 2013	Beggsboro	0 - 0	Glenville	Kilkiernan Road
19:30

24 February 2013 Replay	Glenville	1 - 2	Beggsboro	Oakcourt Avenue, Palmerstown
11:00

- Replay played in Irishtown Stadium as Bangor Celtic's pitch at Iveagh Grounds was unplayable.

== Quarter-final ==
The draw for this round was made on 5 February 2013 by the FAI Domestic Committee. If ties end in a draw after 90 minutes, a replay will be played in which the away side from the first match will have home advantage. In the replay if it remains a draw after 90 minutes, extra-time will be played and if required, penalties. Parkvilla are the lowest ranked team remaining in the competition, playing in the 4th tier of the Leinster Senior League.

3 March 2013	Bluebell United	3 - 0	Parkvilla	Caplo Park
11:00

3 March 2013	Avondale United	1 - 0	Beggsboro	Avondale Park
14:00

3 March 2013	Bangor Celtic	0 - 0	Leixlip United	Iveagh Grounds
14:00

15 March 2013 Replay	Leixlip United	3 - 2	Bangor Celtic	Leixlip Amenities Centre
19:45

3 March 2013	Phoenix F.C. Navan Road	1 - 0	Tolka Rovers	Martin Savage Park
14:00

== Semi-final ==
The draw for the semi-finals were made on 5 March 2013 by the FAI Domestic Committee in the FAI Headquarters, Abbotstown . If ties end in a draw after 90 minutes, a replay will be played in which the away side from the first match will have home advantage. In the replay if it remains a draw after 90 minutes, extra-time will be played and if required, penalties.

7 April 2013	Bluebell United	2 - 0	Phoenix F.C. Navan Road	Caplo Park
11:00

7 April 2013	Leixlip United	0 - 2	Avondale United	Leixlip Amenities Centre
14:00			Ian Stapleton 73'; Mark Sullivan 84'

== Final ==
12 May 2013	Bluebell United	1 - 4	Avondale United	Richmond Park
15:00	Robert Douglas 1'		Roy Long 7' 13'; Ian Stapleton pen' (83); Kevin Mulcahy 88'	Attendance: ??? Referee: Richard Glynn
