= 2016–17 FAI Intermediate Cup =

Tournament details
- Country: Republic of Ireland
- Teams: 89

Final positions
- Champions: Liffey Wanderers
- Runners-up: Cobh Wanderers

The 2016–17 FAI Intermediate Cup, also known as the Umbro FAI Intermediate Cup for sponsorship reasons, was the 90th edition of the national cup competition for provincial level club football in the Republic of Ireland. The sixteen teams that reached the fourth round qualified for the 2017 FAI Cup. The winners were Liffey Wanderers, who defeated Cobh Wanderers on penalties in the final.

== First round ==
Intermediate teams from the Munster Senior League, Leinster Senior League, and the Ulster Senior League entered in this round. The first round was regionalised, meaning clubs could only be drawn against other sides from the same provincial league. So, for example, a team from the Munster Senior League could only play against other Munster teams and not a team from the Leinster Senior League or the Ulster Senior League. Matches were played on a knockout basis. The draw was made on 7 September 2016 with games played on 16, 17, 18, 21 and 25 September 2016.

=== Munster ===
16 September	Rockmount	1–1 (a.e.t.) (4–3 p)	Carrigaline United	Rockmount Park
19:45

17 September	Glasheen A.F.C.	0–1	Ringmahon Rangers A.F.C.	Glasheen Park
14:00

17 September	Blarney United A.F.C.	2–1	Avondale United	O'Shea Park
15:00	Stuart 21'; Quill 50'		O'Shea 60'

17 September	College Corinthians	3–0	Kinsale	Corinthians Park
15:00

17 September	Leeds A.F.C.	3–0	Midleton	Leeds Park
15:00

17 September	Mallow United	0–5	Bandon A.F.C.	Town Park
15:00

18 September	Casement Celtic	0–6	Cobh Wanderers	Casement Park
10:45

18 September	Fermoy F.C.	2–5	UCC	Carrig Park
10:45

21 September	Ballincollig A.F.C.	4–0	Tramore Athletic	O'Shea Park
19:45

Byes:

- Ballinhassig A.F.C.
- Mayfield United
- Castleview A.F.C.
- Passage A.F.C.
- Douglas Hall A.F.C.
- Riverstown F.C.
- Everton A.F.C.
- St Mary's A.F.C.
- Kilreen Celtic F.C.
- Wilton United F.C.
- Leeside A.F.C.

=== Leinster ===
16 September	Broadford Rovers F.C.	0–6	Hartstown Huntstown F.C.	Marlay Park
19:30			O'Reilly 5'; McCabe 50'; McCullagh 70', 75'; McGuire 85', 89'

16 September	Portlaoise A.F.C.	1–2	Swords Celtic F.C.	Rossleighan Park
19:30	Murphy 66'		J.Nolan 78'; P.Nolan 85'

16 September	Glebe North F.C.	1–2	Bluebell United	Market Green
19:45	Hughes 76'		Larkin 70'; Quinn 80'

16 September	Maynooth University Town F.C.	2–1	Dublin Bus F.C.	NUI Maynooth Astro
20:00

18 September	Celbridge Town A.F.C.	0–1	Greenhills Greenpark F.C.	St Patrick's Park
11:00

18 September	Confey F.C.	2–1	Kilnamanagh A.F.C.	Confey Park
11:00

18 September	Knocklyon United	1–0	Dublin University	Kiltipper
11:00

18 September	Newtown Rangers F.C.	5–1	St. Josephs Boys F.C.	Farrell Park
11:00	L.Murtagh 3'; K.Murtagh 23', 41', 92'; Greenalgh 81'		70'

18 September	St. Mochta's	3–0	Ballyfermot United	Porterstown Road
11:00	Somers 30'; Hughes 42'; Kelly 86'

18 September	UCD Reserves	1–3	Leixlip United	Belfield
11:00	Belhout 30'		Barnes 58'; Biansumba 67'; Darcy 83'

18 September	Leicester Celtic	0–2	Tullamore Town	Loretto Park
14:30

18 September	Templeogue United F.C.	1–4	Killester United F.C.	Pearse Park
15:00	65'		Talbot 35'; 46' (o.g.); Mooney 49'; Brophy 55'

21 September	Newbridge Town	0–1	Verona F.C.	Station Road
20:00			Habibovic 20'

25 September	Mount Merrion	1–2 (a.e.t.)	Glenville F.C.	Leopardstown Park
15:00

Byes:

- Arklow Town
- Inchicore Athletic F.C.
- Ballymun United F.C.
- Liffey Wanderers
- Bangor Celtic
- Lucan United F.C.
- Beggsboro A.F.C.
- Malahide United
- Celbridge Town F.C.
- Portmarnock A.F.C.
- Cherry Orchard
- Sacred Heart F.C.
- Crumlin United
- Shamrock Bhoys F.C.
- Drumcondra F.C.
- Skerries Town F.C.
- St.John Bosco F.C.
- Dunboyne A.F.C.
- St. Patrick's C.Y.F.C.
- Edenderry Town
- St James Gate F.C.
- Firhouse Clover F.C.
- T.E.K. United
- Greystones A.F.C.
- Tolka Rovers F.C.
- Home Farm F.C.
- Wayside Celtic F.C.

=== Ulster ===
25 September	Letterkenny Rovers	0–1	Cockhill Celtic	Leckview Park
14:00		Report	Doherty 6'

Byes:

- Bonagee United
- Swilly Rovers F.C.
- Fanad United

== Second round ==
The Second Round was also regionalised, so teams from the Munster Senior League played each other, teams from the Leinster Senior League played each other and teams from the Ulster Senior League played each other on a knockout basis. The draw was made on 4 October with games played on 20,21,22 and 23 October 2016.

=== Munster ===
20 October	St Mary's A.F.C.	2–1	Kilreen Celtic F.C.	St Mary's Park
19:30

21 October	Mayfield United	1–2	Riverstown F.C.	Mayfield Park
19:45

21 October	Rockmount	3–0	Wilton United F.C.	Rockmount Park
19:45

22 October	Ballincollig A.F.C.	3–2	UCC	Landing Field
14:00

22 October	Bandon A.F.C.	0–3	Douglas Hall A.F.C.	Town Park
14:00

22 October	Blarney United A.F.C.	2–0	Ballinhassig A.F.C.	O'Shea Park
14:00

22 October	College Corinthians	5–0	Passage A.F.C.	Corinthians Park
14:00

22 October	Leeds A.F.C.	1–2	Cobh Wanderers	Leeds Park
14:00

22 October	Leeside A.F.C.	2–3	Ringmahon Rangers A.F.C.	Leeside Park
14:00

23 October	Everton A.F.C.	2–1	Castleview A.F.C.	Everton Park
10:45

=== Leinster ===
21 October	Beggsboro A.F.C.	2–2 (a.e.t.) (2–3 p)	Bangor Celtic	Killkiernan Road
19:30

21 October	Edenderry Town	7–0	Arklow Town	Paddy Maloney Park
19:45

21 October	Hartstown Huntstown F.C.	0–1	Greystones A.F.C.	Hartstown All Weather
19:45

21 October	Malahide United	6–2	St.John Bosco F.C.	Gannon Park
19:45

21 October	Tullamore Town	2–0	Lucan United F.C.	Leah Victoria Park
19:45

21 October	St. Patrick's C.Y.F.C.	5–1	Maynooth University Town F.C.	Ringsend Astro
20:00

21 October	Swords Celtic F.C.	2–1	Leixlip United	Balheary
20:00

21 October	Tolka Rovers F.C.	2–2 (a.e.t.) (2–3 p)	Crumlin United	Frank Cooke Park
20:00

23 October	Ballymun United F.C.	2–0	Knocklyon United	Ballymun Complex
11:00

23 October	Cherry Orchard	2–1	Dunboyne A.F.C.	Elmdale
11:00

23 October	Glenville F.C.	1–0	Home Farm F.C.	Palmerstown College
11:00

23 October	Kilnamanagh A.F.C.	1–3	Firhouse Clover F.C.	Ned Kelly Park
11:00

23 October	Newtown Rangers F.C.	2–3 (a.e.t.)	Liffey Wanderers	Farrell Park
11:00

23 October	Portmarnock A.F.C.	3–3 (a.e.t.) (4–3 p)	St James Gate F.C.	Paddys Hill
11:00

23 October	Shamrock Bhoys F.C.	1–3	Sacred Heart F.C.	Vevay Park
11:00

23 October	Skerries Town F.C.	3–1	Inchicore Athletic F.C.	Park Lane
11:00

23 October	St. Mochta's	1–2	Bluebell United	Porterstown Road
11:00

23 October	T.E.K. United	2–2 (a.e.t.) (4–5 p)	Drumcondra F.C.	Deansgrange
11:00

23 October	Killester United F.C.	4–1	Greenhills Greenpark F.C.	Haddon Park
14:30

23 October	Wayside Celtic F.C.	3–2 (a.e.t.)	Verona F.C.	Jackson Park
14:30

=== Ulster ===
23 October	Cockhill Celtic	7–0	Swilly Rovers F.C.	Charlie O'Donnell Sports Ground
13:30

23 October	Fanad United	1–2	Bonagee United	Traigh-A-Loch
13:30

== Third round ==
The third round was not regionalised, so teams from the Munster Senior League, Leinster Senior League, and Ulster Senior League all played each other on a knockout basis. The draw was made on 1 November with games played on or before 27 November 2016.

Swords Celtic	0–6	Crumlin United

St Mary's	2–0	Skerries Town F.C.

St. Patrick's C.Y.F.C.	0–0	Ballymun United F.C.

11 December Replay	Ballymun United F.C.	3–2	St. Patrick's C.Y.F.C.

Portmarnock A.F.C	4–2	Riverstown F.C.

Killester United F.C.	1–0	Blarney United

Drumcondra F.C.	1–3	Bangor Celtic F.C.

Everton A.F.C.	4–2	Wayside Celtic

Cobh Wanderers	1–1	Sacred Heart F.C.

11 December Replay	Sacred Heart F.C.	2–4	Cobh Wanderers

Bluebell United	4–3	Tullamore Town

Edenderry Town	2–0	Bonagee United

Glenville F.C.	1–0	Douglas Hall A.F.C.

College Corinthians A.F.C.	1–0	Cockhill Celtic

Ballincollig A.F.C.	0–0	Ringmahon Rangers

10 December Replay	Ringmahon Rangers	1–1 (a.e.t.) (5–6 p)	Ballincollig A.F.C.

Liffey Wanderers	2–0	Rockmount A.F.C.

Cherry Orchard	3–1	Malahide United

Firhouse Clover	2–3	Greystones United A.F.C.

== Fourth round ==
The fourth round was not regionalised, so teams from the Munster Senior League, Leinster Senior League, and Ulster Senior League all played each other on a knockout basis. The draw was made on 6 December 2016 with fixtures to be played on the week ending 22 January 2017.

22 January	Liffey Wanderers	2–0	St Mary's

5 February	Cherry Orchard	1–2	Everton A.F.C.

Glenville F.C.	2–4	Edenderry Town

Crumlin United	6–1	Ballymun United F.C.

4 February	Ballincollig A.F.C.	1–2	Bluebell United
	Roche 47'		Cleary 45', Stritch 80'

Bangor Celtic F.C.	1–2	Greystones United A.F.C.

4 February	Cobh Wanderers	1–0	Killester United F.C.
	Curran 10'

22 January	College Corinthians A.F.C.	2–1	Portmarnock A.F.C
2pm

== Quarter-finals ==
The draw for this round was made on 7 February 2017. If ties end in a draw after 90 minutes, a replay will be played in which the away side from the first match will have home advantage. In the replay, if scores remains level after 90 minutes, extra-time will be played and, if required, penalties.

18 February	Crumlin United	2–3	Cobh Wanderers
	Murray; Hurley; Dowling (red card) 53'; Meade (red card)		Stapleton, 63', 74'

24 February	Liffey Wanderers	2–2	Edenderry Town
	Lee Roche 15'; Aidan Roche 67'		Kenny McNamara 2'; Aaron McDonnell 14'

12 March Replay	Edenderry Town	0–2	Liffey Wanderers
			C O'Brien; G Young

24 February	Greystones United	3–0	Bluebell United
	Gary Dempsey,,

5 March	Everton A.F.C.	0–3	College Corinthians
			Cian Murphy 55'; James Furlong 72'; Ronan Staunton 88'

== Semi-finals ==
The draw for this round was made on 14 March 2017. The semi-finals were scheduled to be played on the week ending 26 March 2017. If ties end in a draw after 90 minutes, a replay will be played in which the away side from the first match will have home advantage. In the replay, if scores remains level after 90 minutes, extra-time will be played and, if required, penalties.

2 April	College Corinthians	0–2	Liffey Wanderers
14:00 GMT

8 April	Greystones United	0–0	Cobh Wanderers	Greystones, County Wicklow
18:00 GMT				Stadium: Woodlands

15 April Replay	Cobh Wanderers	1–0	Greystones United	Cobh, County Cork
14:00 GMT	Alan O'Flynn			Stadium: Old Church

== Final ==
The final took place on 13 May 2017 in the Aviva Staidum.

13 May	Liffey Wanderers	2–2 (a.e.t.) (5–4 p)	Cobh Wanderers	Dublin, Ireland
15:00 GMT	Clayton Maher 72'; Aidan Roche 94'	Report	Conor Meade 85'; 120' +1'	Stadium: Aviva Stadium
	Penalties
	Carl O'Brien (penalty scored); Conor Riddick (penalty missed); Lee Roche (penalty scored); Anthony O'Connor (penalty scored); Adam Deegan (penalty scored); Anthony Gray (penalty scored)		Ian Stapleton (penalty missed); Eoin Hastings (penalty scored); Brian Fitzgerald (penalty scored); Shane Geasley (penalty scored); Alan O'Flynn (penalty scored); Michael O'Shea (penalty missed)
