= 2013 FAI Cup =

FAI Ford Cup

Tournament details
- Country: Republic of Ireland
- Teams: 40

Final positions
- Champions: Sligo Rovers
- Runners-up: Drogheda United

The 2013 FAI Cup, known as the FAI Ford Senior Cup for sponsorship reasons, was the 93rd staging of the primary domestic cup competition for association football in the Republic of Ireland. It featured teams from the League of Ireland Premier Division and First Division, as well as teams from the regional leagues of the Republic of Ireland football league system.

The winners of the competition earned a spot in the first qualifying round of the 2014–15 UEFA Europa League.

A total of 40 teams competed in the 2013 competition, which commenced on the weekend ending on 31 March 2013. The teams entering from the 2013 League of Ireland Premier Division and First Division received byes into the second round stage. Four non-league clubs also received byes to the second round. The remaining 12 teams entered at the first round stage. The non-league teams were composed of the sixteen clubs that reached the fourth round of the 2012–13 FAI Intermediate Cup and the semi-finalists of the 2012–13 FAI Junior Cup.

== Teams ==
Round	Clubs remaining	Clubs involved	Winners from previous round	New entries this round	Leagues entering at this round
First round	40	16	none	16	Leinster Senior League; Munster Senior League; Ulster Senior League
Second round	32	32	8	24	League of Ireland
Third round	16	16	16	none	none
Quarter-finals	8	8	8	none	none
Semi-finals	4	4	4	none	none
Final	2	2	2	none	none

== First round ==
The draw for this round was conducted by FAI President Paddy McCaul at the FAI headquarters in Abbotstown on 5 March 2013. 16 of the 20 non-League of Ireland clubs are participating in this round, with the remaining 4 clubs earning a bye to the second round. The matches were played on the weekend ending 31 March 2013.

29 March 2013	Leixlip United	1 − 3	Sheriff Y.C.	Leixlip Amenities Centre
19:45 IST	Martin (penalty missed) 50'; Markey 88'	Report	36', 79' Murphy; 76' Dunne	Attendance: 300; Referee: Declan Troy

29 March 2013	Tolka Rovers	2 − 1	Bangor Celtic	Frank Cooke Park
19:45 IST	Murray 2'; Rogers 90+5'		90+1' Burke

30 March 2013	St. Mary's	0 − 1	Phoenix F.C. Navan Road	St. Mary's Park
14:00 IST			71' Gleeson

30 March 2013	Parkvilla	1 − 1	Blarney United	Claremont Stadium, Navan
15:00 IST	O'Neill 30'		73' Leahy

30 March 2013	St. Patrick's C.Y.F.C.	3 − 2	Carew Park F.C.	Irishtown Stadium
17:00 IST	O'Connor 44'; Doolin 75'; Mooney 90'		4' Connery; 72' Grant

31 March 2013	Glenville F.C.	0 − 0	Beggsboro A.F.C.	Oakcourt Avenue, Palmerstown
11:00 IST

31 March 2013	Everton	1 − 3	Pike Rovers	Everton Park
14:00 IST	Hore 24'		8' Moloney; 43' O'Shea; 72' Tierney	Referee: Aiden O'Regan

6 April 2013	College Corinthians	1 − 1	Newbridge Town	Corinthians Park
15:00 IST	Carroll 62'

=== First round Replays ===
5 April 2013	Beggsboro A.F.C.	2 − 3	Glenville F.C.	Kilkiernan Road
19:30 IST

6 April 2013	Blarney United	2 − 1	Parkvilla	O'Shea Park
15:00 IST	O'Leary 83'; Murray 90+3'	Report	45+1' (pen.) McCrossan	Attendance: 60; Referee: Aiden O'Regan

20 April 2013	Newbridge Town	0–1 (a.e.t.)	College Corinthians	Station Road, Newbridge
15:00 IST	McDonald (red card) 67'	Report	101' Tobin	Attendance: 100; Referee: Colin Duffy

== Second round ==
The draw for the second round was made live on Monday Night Soccer on 29 April. The draw was made by FAI President Paddy McCaul and Nicky Byrne, a former international goalkeeper for Republic of Ireland youth sides and former member of the boy band Westlife.

31 May 2013	Tolka Rovers	2–2	College Corinthians	The Frank Cooke Complex
19:45	Doyle 5'; Nolan 70'	Report	Stanton 19'; Holmes 30'	Referee: Ben Connolly

31 May 2013	Bray Wanderers	2–0	Mervue United	Carlisle Grounds, Bray
19:45	Byrne 20', 25' (pen.)	Report		Referee: Padraigh Sutton

31 May 2013	Bohemians	0–3	Drogheda United	Dalymount Park, Phibsborough
19:45		Report	Quigley 4'; O'Brien 38'; Hand 67'	Referee: Neil Doyle

31 May 2013	Salthill Devon	0–2	Shamrock Rovers	Eamonn Deacy Park, Galway
19:45		Report	Dennehy 61', 79'	Referee: Paul McLaughlin

31 May 2013	Phoenix	0–4	Dundalk	Oriel Park, Dundalk
19:45		Report	Hoban 7', 25'; Byrne 39'; Mulvenna 89'	Referee: Adriano Reale

31 May 2013	Finn Harps	2–1	Wexford Youths	Finn Park, Ballybofey
20:00	Cowan 55'; McCarron 79' (pen.)	Report	Molloy 85'	Referee: Ray Matthews

31 May 2013	Shelbourne	3–0	Bandon A.F.C.	Tolka Park, Drumcondra
20:00	Kelly 21', 61'; Leech 87'	Report		Referee: Rob Harvey

1 June 2013	St. Patrick's C.Y.F.C.	3–4	Cobh Ramblers	Frank Cooke Park
14:30	Dunne 61', 90+5' (pen.); Mooney 90'	Report	Fitzgerald 3'; Meade 11', 49' (pen.); Donoghue 55'	Referee: Neil Doyle

1 June 2013	Blarney United	0–4	Derry City	O'Shea Park
15:00		Report	Patterson 53', 88', 90'; Curran 86'	Referee: Anthony Buttimer

1 June 2013	Glenville F.C.	0–3	Limerick	Whitehall Stadium, Whitehall
15:00		Report	Gaffney 22', 56'; Bradley 66'	Referee: Paul Tuite

1 June 2013	St Patrick's Athletic	4–0	UCD	Richmond Park, Inchicore
15:00	Fagan 31', 52'; Kelly 62'; Matthews 79' (o.g.)	Report		Referee: Rob Rogers

1 June 2013	Bluebell United	2–2	Athlone Town	John Hyland Park
19:00	Griffiths 8' (pen.); Douglas 77'	Report	Sweeney 31', 66'	Referee: Simon Rogers

1 June 2013	Waterford United	0–2	Sligo Rovers	Waterford Regional Sports Centre, Waterford
19:00		Report	Ventre 21'; Elding 45+2'	Referee: Sean Grant

1 June 2013	Longford Town	4–0	Pike Rovers	City Calling Stadium, Longford
19:30	O'Sullivan 15', 59', 75'; Salmon 90+2' (pen.)	Report		Referee: Alan Sherlock

9 June 2013	Avondale United	1–2	Sheriff Y.C.	Avondale Park
14:00	McCarthy 90'	Report	Rock 70' (pen.), 85'	Referee: Keith Callanan

5 August 2013	Cork City	3–1	Kilbarrack United	Turners Cross
19:45	Morrissey 1', 54'; Buckley 62'	Report	McHugh 67'	Referee: Keith Callanan

=== Second round Replays ===
4 June 2013	Athlone Town	2–3 (a.e.t.)	Bluebell United	Athlone Town Stadium, Athlone
20:45	Sweeney 35'; Mustapha 69'	Report	Molloy 45', 57'; Darcy 101'	Referee: Paul McLaughlin

8 June 2013	College Corinthians	3–0 (a.e.t.)	Tolka Rovers	Castletreasure
16:00	Kra 100'; Heffernan 115'; Donovan 117'	Report		Referee: Tommy Mazur

== Third round ==
The draw for the third round was made live on Monday Night Soccer on 15 July. The draw was made by FAI President Paddy McCaul and Republic of Ireland U19 team manager Paul Doolin.

23 August 2013	Bray Wanderers	0–3	St. Patrick's Athletic	Carlisle Grounds, Bray
19:45		Report	Bolger 18'; Byrne 61'; Brennan 67' (pen.)	Attendance: 700; Referee: Padraigh Sutton

23 August 2013	Derry City	0–0	Bluebell United	Brandywell Stadium, Derry
19:45		Report		Referee: Paul McLaughlin

23 August 2013	Dundalk	5–3	Limerick	Oriel Park, Dundalk
19:45	O'Donnell 6' (pen.); Towell 24'; Byrne 38', 61'; Meenan 58'	Report	Bossekota 16'; Gaffney 75'	Attendance: 1,321; Referee: Anthony Buttimer

23 August 2013	Finn Harps	1–1	Cobh Ramblers	Finn Park, Ballybofey
20:00	McHugh 7'	Report	Meade 90+1'	Referee: Ray Matthews

23 August 2013	Shelbourne	1–0	College Corinthians	Tolka Park, Dublin
20:00	Kelly 5'	Report		Attendance: 336; Referee: Rob Rogers

23 August 2013	Shamrock Rovers	3–1	Sheriff Y.C.	Tallaght Stadium, Dublin
20:00	Stewart 9'; Robinson 21'; Quigley 65' (pen.)	Report	Rock 56'	Referee: Rob Harvey

24 August 2013	Longford Town	2–3	Drogheda United	City Calling Stadium, Longford
19:30	McCarthy 17'; O'Brien 90'	Report	O'Conor 55'; Grimes 56'; Brady 73'	Referee: Kevin O'Regan

24 August 2013	Sligo Rovers	1–0	Cork City F.C.	The Showgrounds, Sligo
19:45	Peers 57'	Report		Attendance: 1,978; Referee: Paul Tuite

=== Third round Replays ===
26 August 2013	Cobh Ramblers	0–4	Finn Harps	St. Colman's Park, Cobh
20:00		Report	McHugh 35'; Toland 38'; McVeigh 80'; Funston 90'	Referee: Andrew Mullally

27 August 2013	Derry City	2–1	Bluebell United	Brandywell Stadium, Derry
19:45	Patterson 36'; McNamee 83'	Report	Sherlock 90+1'	Attendance: 400; Referee: Rob Rogers

== Quarter-finals ==
The draw for the quarter-finals was made on 26 August on Monday Night Soccer. The draw was made by FAI President Paddy McCaul and former goalkeeper Alan O'Neill who won the FAI Cup with Shamrock Rovers, Dundalk and UCD. Fixtures took place on the weekend of 15 September 2013.

13 September 2013	St. Patrick's Athletic	0–2	Shamrock Rovers	Richmond Park, Dublin
19:45		Report	Finn 16'; Robinson 33'	Attendance: 2,790; Referee: Alan Kelly

13 September 2013	Shelbourne	1–5	Dundalk	Tolka Park, Dublin
20:00	Murphy 50'	Report	Towell 13', 45'; Boyle 19'; Hoban 32'; Byrne 44'	Attendance: 1,158; Referee: Padraigh Sutton

13 September 2013	Finn Harps	1–1	Drogheda United	Finn Park, Ballybofey
20:00	McHugh 22'	Report	Daly 85'	Referee: Tomas Connolly

15 September 2013	Sligo Rovers	1–0	Derry City	The Showgrounds, Sligo
17:00	Cretaro 15'	Report		Referee: Neil Doyle

=== Quarter-finals replays ===
16 September 2013	Drogheda United	2–0	Finn Harps	Hunky Dorys Park, Drogheda
19:45	O'Brien 50'; Cassidy 90+2'	Report		Referee: Derek Tomney

== Semi-finals ==
The draw for the semi-finals was made on 16 September on Monday Night Soccer. The draw was made by the Director of the Airtricity League Fran Gavin and former Irish national player Turlough O'Connor. Fixtures took place on the weekend of 6 October 2013. Both matches were shown live on RTÉ Two.

6 October 2013	Drogheda United	1–0	Dundalk	Hunky Dorys Park, Drogheda
13:45	Brennan 31' (pen.)	Report		Attendance: 2,000

6 October 2013	Sligo Rovers	3–0	Shamrock Rovers	The Showgrounds, Sligo
15:55	Ventre 25'; Keane 74' (pen.); Elding 89'	Report		Attendance: 3,933

== Final ==
3 November 2013	Drogheda United	2–3	Sligo Rovers	Aviva Stadium, Dublin
15:30 GMT	O'Conor 13'; R. Brennan 90+2'	Report	North 78', 85'; Elding 90+4'	Attendance: 17,753; Referee: Paul Tuite
