= Brendan Kennedy =

Irish footballer

Personal information
- Date of birth: 7 December 1974 (age 51)
- Place of birth: Dublin, Ireland
- Position: Goalkeeper

Youth career
- Cherry Orchard

Senior career*
Years	Team	Apps	(Gls)
1993–1995	Shamrock Rovers	0	(0)
1995–1996	Dundalk	0	(0)
1996–1998	Ashtown Villa	59	(0)
1998–1999	Parkvilla F.C.	27	(0)
1999–2000	Moyle Park	30	(0)
2000–2001	Cherry Orchard F.C.	43	(0)
2001–2004	Dublin City	34	(0)
2004	Kildare County	11	(0)
2005	Dublin City	20	(0)
2006	Kildare County	28	(0)
2006–2007	Bangor Celtic F.C.	26	(0)
2008–2009	Monaghan United	22	(0)
- * Club domestic league appearances and goals

Brendan Kennedy (born 7 December 1974, in Dublin) is an Irish former footballer.

Kennedy is the brother of former Liverpool and Irish international Mark Kennedy. He is a goalkeeper who played for junior clubs such as Cherry Orchard, Ashtown Villa, and Moyle Park before entering the League of Ireland with Shamrock Rovers in the 1993–94 season.

Kennedy played underage football for Shamrock Rovers and Dundalk. He made one appearance as a substitute for 4 minutes for Rovers in the League of Ireland on 15 August 1993. Kennedy joined Ashtown Villa, who were competing in the Leinster Senior League, in 1996. Over the next six seasons, Kennedy played with Parkvilla, Moyle Park and Cherry Orchard before making his League of Ireland debut for Dublin City in the 2001–02 season.

He played for Dublin City from 2002 to 2004. Kennedy won the League of Ireland First Division championship — and promotion to the Premier Division – with City in 2003 but was released by new manager Roddy Collins in the late summer of 2004. Kennedy returned to the First Division whereupon he joined Kildare County, making 11 first-team appearances during the season.

He rejoined Dublin City in 2005, but appeared only sporadically in the latter part of the season, James Gallagher, on loan from Finn Harps, being Dermot Keely's preferred goalkeeper. Kennedy was, however, recalled for the promotion/relegation play-off in which City beat Shamrock Rovers to once more gain admission to the Premier Division. Despite this, Kennedy was not offered a new contract at the end of the 2005 season and he rejoined Kildare County.

His second stint in Kildare began in December. He was a consistent goalkeeper throughout the season. His performances included a penalty save against Limerick in a league match in September.

Towards the end of the 2006 season Kennedy struggled to hold on to his place due to competition with the promising new keeper John Flynn.

Kennedy was released from Kildare County at the end of the 2006 season and was not signed by a League of Ireland club for the 2007 season. He instead joined Bangor Celtic, but returned to the League of Ireland in 2008 after signing for Monaghan United. He made 38 league appearances for the Mons over the following two years but left the club at the end of the 2010 season. He then played with LSL side Lucan United before hanging up his boots and joining former boss Mick Cooke at Drogheda United as goalkeeping coach.

Kennedy later joined St. Mochta's as director of football. He then became manager of Leinster Senior League side Dunboyne A.F.C. in 2015. He departed in 2017 to take charge of Swords Celtic.

== Honours ==
Dublin City

- League of Ireland First Division: 2003
