= Rob Rogers =

Rob Rogers may refer to:

- Rob Rogers (referee)
- Rob Rogers (cartoonist)
