= 2019–20 Leinster Senior League =

Leinster Senior League
- Season: 2019-20

2019–20 Leinster Senior League2019–20 Leinster Senior League lists the results of the Leinster Senior League, an Irish association football league under the Leinster Football Association, for the 2019–20 season.

== Senior Division ==
#	Team	P	W	D	L	F	A	GD	Pts
1.	Bluebell United	19	18	0	1	73	19	54	54
2.	Crumlin United FC	19	14	3	2	54	20	34	45
3.	Maynooth University Town FC	19	12	5	2	53	22	31	41
4.	Cherry Orchard	21	12	3	6	53	35	18	39
5.	Bangor GG FC	20	10	4	6	50	41	9	34
6.	UCD AFC	20	9	3	8	44	36	8	30
7.	Liffey Wanderers	21	6	6	9	39	45	-6	24
8.	Swords Celtic FC	21	7	1	13	30	59	-29	22
9.	Booth Road Celtic	20	6	3	11	44	59	-15	21
10.	Ballymun United	20	4	3	13	29	56	-27	15
11.	Colepark United	21	3	2	16	28	69	-41	11
12.	St. Patrick's CYFC	21	2	3	16	33	69	-36	9

== Senior 1 ==
#	Team	P	W	D	L	F	A	GD	Pts
1.	Malahide United	21	18	3	0	70	18	52	57
2.	St. Mochtas FC	20	15	3	2	59	18	41	48
3.	Tolka Rovers	19	12	1	6	49	21	28	37
4.	Wayside Celtic	19	10	5	4	60	29	31	35
5.	Home Farm FC	19	10	2	7	56	36	20	32
6.	Templeogue United FC	19	7	1	11	35	47	-12	22
7.	St. John Bosco	19	6	3	10	36	54	-18	21
8.	Newtown Rangers AFC	19	6	3	10	32	58	-26	21
9.	Glebe North	19	5	3	11	32	64	-32	18
10.	Glenville FC	19	4	3	12	31	60	-29	15
11.	Dublin Bus	19	4	2	13	34	51	-17	14
12.	T.E.K. United	20	3	3	14	27	65	-38	12

== Senior 1A ==
#	Team	P	W	D	L	F	A	GD	Pts
1.	Sacred Heart Firhouse Clover	22	17	2	3	52	22	30	53
2.	Portmarnock AFC	22	12	5	5	41	29	12	41
3.	Kilnamanagh AFC	22	12	4	6	74	41	33	40
4.	Seafordrock United	22	12	4	6	52	37	15	40
5.	St. Kevins Boys	21	10	4	7	40	33	7	34
6.	Collinstown FC	22	10	3	9	63	53	10	33
7.	Columbas Rovers	22	9	1	12	37	40	-3	28
8.	Verona FC	21	7	4	10	34	44	-10	25
9.	Leicester Celtic FC	22	7	4	11	38	50	-12	25
10.	Pegasus/St. James Ath	22	6	6	10	43	55	-12	24
11.	Drumcondra FC	22	4	3	15	29	58	-29	15
12.	Killester Donnycarney FC	22	3	4	15	24	65	-41	13
13.	Inchicore Athletic FC	0	0	0	0	0	0	0	0

== Senior 1B ==
#	Team	P	W	D	L	F	A	GD	Pts
1.	Railway Union	18	15	1	2	60	11	49	46
2.	St. Francis FC	18	14	1	3	56	21	35	43
3.	Sheriff YC	17	13	1	3	55	30	25	40
4.	Balscadden FC	16	9	2	5	40	27	13	29
5.	Ballybrack FC	20	7	2	11	33	45	-12	23
6.	Finglas United	18	7	2	9	30	48	-18	23
7.	Dunboyne AFC	18	6	4	8	32	30	2	22
8.	St Vincents Hospital FC	15	7	1	7	29	31	-2	22
9.	UCD AFC	16	6	2	8	27	29	-2	20
10.	Greystones United AFC	20	3	4	13	21	51	-30	13
11.	Dublin University FC	20	1	0	19	7	67	-60	3
12.	Ringsend Rovers	0	0	0	0	0	0	0	0
