= Irish Intermediate Cup =

Northern Irish football competition

- Sport: Football
- Founded: 1892
- Country: Ireland (1892–1921); Northern Ireland (since 1921)
- Most recent champions: Crumlin Star (4th Title) (2025–26)
- Most titles: Linfield Swifts (11 Titles)

The Irish Intermediate Cup is a Northern Irish football competition for teams of intermediate status, including NIFL Premiership reserve sides. It is a straight knock-out tournament and is currently sponsored by McCombs Coach Travel.

The current holders are Crumlin Star.

== Past winners ==
- 1892–93 Distillery Rovers*
- 1893–94 Glentoran II*
- 1894–95 Milltown
- 1895–96 Cliftonville Olympic*
- 1896–97 Linfield Swifts*
- 1897–98 Glentoran II*
- 1898–99 Linfield Swifts*
- 1899–1900 Cliftonville Olympic*
- 1900–01 Linfield Swifts*
- 1901–02 Cliftonville Olympic*
- 1902–03 Distillery Rovers*
- 1903–04 YMCA
- 1904–05 Frankfort
- 1905–06 Forth River
- 1906–07 Forth River
- 1907–08 Glenavon
- 1908–09 Glentoran II*
- 1909–10 St James' Gate
- 1910–11 Glenavon
- 1911–12 Derry Guilds
- 1912–13 Glentoran II*
- 1913–14 Belfast Celtic II*
- 1914–15 UCD
- 1915–16 Glentoran II*
- 1916–17 Strandville
- 1917–18 Glentoran II*
- 1918–19 Cup withheld
- 1919–20 St James' Gate
- 1920–21 Queen's Island
- 1921–22 Linfield Rangers
- 1922–23 Dunmurry
- 1923–24 Willowfield
- 1924–25 Linfield Rangers
- 1925–26 Ballyclare Comrades
- 1926–27 Crusaders
- 1927–28 Willowfield
- 1928–29 Linfield Swifts*
- 1929–30 Dunmurry
- 1930–31 Glentoran II*
- 1931–32 Broadway United
- 1932–33 Dunville's
- 1933–34 Sunnyside
- 1934–35 Belfast Celtic II*
- 1935–36 Belfast Celtic II*
- 1936–37 Belfast Celtic II*
- 1937–38 Crusaders
- 1938–39 Crusaders
- 1939–40 Belfast Celtic II*
- 1940–41 Glentoran II*
- 1941–42 Bangor Reserves*
- 1942–43 Larne Olympic*
- 1943–44 Bangor Reserves*
- 1944–45 Bangor Reserves*
- 1945–46 Linfield Swifts*
- 1946–47 Dundela
- 1947–48 Distillery II*
- 1948–49 Linfield Swifts*
- 1949–50 Ballyclare Comrades
- 1950–51 Ballyclare Comrades
- 1951–52 Brantwood
- 1952–53 Brantwood
- 1953–54 Ballyclare Comrades
- 1954–55 Dundela
- 1955–56 Linfield Swifts*
- 1956–57 Linfield Swifts*
- 1957–58 Newry Town
- 1958–59 Larne
- 1959–60 Ballyclare Comrades
- 1960–61 Ballyclare Comrades
- 1961–62 Glentoran II*
- 1962–63 Ballyclare Comrades
- 1963–64 Ballyclare Comrades
- 1964–65 Coleraine Reserves*
- 1965–66 Dundela
- 1966–67 Newry Town
- 1967–68 Chimney Corner
- 1968–69 Coleraine Reserves*
- 1969–70 Larne
- 1970–71 Ards II*
- 1971–72 Linfield Swifts*
- 1972–73 Brantwood
- 1973–74 Limavady United
- 1974–75 Dundela
- 1975–76 Carrick Rangers
- 1976–77 Carrick Rangers
- 1977–78 Dungannon Swifts
- 1978–79 RUC
- 1979–80 RUC
- 1980–81 Newry Town
- 1981–82 Chimney Corner
- 1982–83 Chimney Corner
- 1983–84 Dundela
- 1984–85 RUC
- 1985–86 Banbridge Town
- 1986–87 RUC
- 1987–88 Short Brothers
- 1988–89 Dundela
- 1989–90 Ballyclare Comrades
- 1990–91 Brantwood
- 1991–92 Dungannon Swifts
- 1992–93 Dundela
- 1993–94 Portstewart
- 1994–95 Ballinamallard United
- 1995–96 Limavady United
- 1996–97 Chimney Corner
- 1997–98 Loughgall
- 1998–99 Dundela
- 1999–2000 Dundela
- 2000–01 Dundela
- 2001–02 Linfield Swifts*
- 2002–03 Harland & Wolff Welders
- 2003–04 Linfield Swifts*
- 2004–05 Glenavon
- 2005–06 Donegal Celtic
- 2006–07 Harland & Wolff Welders
- 2007–08 Loughgall
- 2008–09 Knockbreda Parish
- 2009–10 Donegal Celtic
- 2010–11 Carrick Rangers
- 2011–12 Newry City
- 2012–13 Institute
- 2013–14 Bangor
- 2014–15 Carrick Rangers
- 2015–16 Institute
- 2016–17 Limavady United
- 2017–18 Queen's University
- 2018–19 Crumlin Star
- 2019–20 Dollingstown
- 2020–21 Not played due to COVID-19 pandemic
- 2021–22 Rathfriland Rangers
- 2022–23 Crumlin Star
- 2023–24 Immaculata
- 2024–25 Crumlin Star
- 2025–26 Crumlin Star

NB. * denotes reserve teams of senior clubs

== Performance by club ==
Team	No. of wins	Winning years
Linfield Swifts*	11	1896–97, 1898–99, 1900–01, 1928–29, 1945–46, 1948–49, 1955–56, 1956–57, 1971–72, 2001–02, 2003–04
Dundela	10	1946–47, 1954–55, 1965–66, 1974–75, 1983–84, 1988–89, 1992–93, 1998–99, 1999–2000, 2000–01
Ballyclare Comrades	9	1925–26, 1949–50, 1950–51, 1953–54, 1959–60, 1960–61, 1962–63, 1963–64, 1989–90
Glentoran II*	9	1893–94, 1897–98, 1908–09, 1912–13, 1915–16, 1917–18, 1930–31, 1940–41, 1961–62
Belfast Celtic II*	5	1913–14, 1934–35, 1935–36, 1936–37, 1939–40
Brantwood	4	1951–52, 1952–53, 1972–73, 1990–91
Carrick Rangers	4	1975–76, 1976–77, 2010–11, 2014–15
Chimney Corner	4	1967–68, 1981–82, 1982–83, 1996–97
Crumlin Star	4	2018-19, 2022-23, 2024-25, 2025-26
Newry Cityƒ	4	1957–58, 1966–67, 1980–81, 2011–12
RUC†	4	1978–79, 1979–80, 1984–85, 1986–87
Bangor Reserves*	3	1941–42, 1943–44, 1944–45
Cliftonville Olympic*	3	1895–96, 1899–1900, 1901–02
Crusaders	3	1926–27, 1937–38, 1938–39
Distillery Rovers / II*	3	1892–93, 1902–03, 1947–48
Glenavon	3	1907–08, 1910–11, 2004–05
Limavady United	3	1973–74, 1995–96, 2016–17
Coleraine Reserves*	2	1964–65, 1968–69
Donegal Celtic	2	2005–06, 2009–10
Dungannon Swifts	2	1977–78, 1991–92
Dunmurry	2	1922–23, 1929–30
Forth River	2	1905–06, 1906–07
Harland & Wolff Welders	2	2002–03, 2006–07
Institute	2	2012–13, 2015–16
Larne	2	1958–59, 1969–70
Linfield Rangers*	2	1921–22, 1924–25
Loughgall	2	1997–98, 2007–08
St James' Gate	2	1909–10, 1919–20
Willowfield	2	1923–24, 1927–28
Ards II*	1	1970–71
Ballinamallard United	1	1994–95
Banbridge Town	1	1985–86
Bangor	1	2013–14
Broadway United	1	1931–32
Derry Guilds	1	1911–12
Dollingstown	1	2019–20
Dunville's	1	1932–33
Immaculata	1	2023–24
Knockbreda Parish	1	2008–09
Larne Olympic*	1	1942–43
Milltown	1	1894–95
Portstewart	1	1993–94
Queen's Island	1	1920–21
Queen's University	1	2017–18
Rathfriland Rangers	1	2021–22
Short Brothers	1	1987–88
Strandville	1	1916–17
Sunnyside	1	1933–34
UCD	1	1914–15
Frankfort	1	1904–05
YMCA	1	1903–04

- * indicates reserve team
- † now known as PSNI
- ƒ previously Newry Town

== See also ==
- Irish Cup
