= FAI Intermediate Cup =

- Organiser(s): Football Association of Ireland
- Founded: 1926
- Region: (Republic of Ireland) Ireland
- Domestic cup: Tom Hand Memorial Cup
- Current champions: Cobh Wanderers F.C. (1st title) (2026)
- Most championships: Avondale United (8 titles)
- Website: FAI Intermediate Cup @ www.fai.ie

The FAI Intermediate Cup (Irish: Corn Comortais Peile na hÉireann), also known as the FAI Umbro Intermediate Cup and the Pat O'Brien Intermediate Challenge Cup, is a cup competition organized by the Football Association of Ireland for intermediate association football clubs from the Republic of Ireland. These include clubs competing in the Leinster Senior League and the Munster Senior League. It was originally known as the FAI Qualifying Cup and from the beginning it has been used as a qualifying competition for the senior FAI Cup. It is currently sponsored by Umbro and has previously been sponsored by Carlsberg.

== History ==
=== FAI Qualifying Cup ===
The competition was originally known as the FAI Qualifying Cup before it was renamed the FAI Intermediate Cup at the start of the 1931–32 season. The cup's first winners were Drumcondra who beat Cobh Ramblers in the inaugural 1926–27 final. Drumcondra, who at the time were playing in the Leinster Senior League, subsequently went on to complete a cup double when they defeated Brideville 1–0 in the 1926–27 FAI Cup final. The competition continues to act a qualifying competition for the FAI Cup with clubs who reach the Round of Sixteen being invited to compete in the senior cup.

=== League of Ireland ===
In addition to being the inaugural winners, Drumcondra were also the first of several future League of Ireland clubs to win the FAI Intermediate Cup. Cork Bohemians, Sligo Rovers, Longford Town, UCD, Cobh Ramblers, St Patricks Athletic, Albert Rovers, Bray Wanderers, Home Farm and Cork Hibernians, playing as AOH, all subsequently won the cup before joining the national league. Athlone Town were also finalists on one occasion. Jacobs, St. James's Gate and Transport all won the cup after leaving the League of Ireland. With five wins, Longford Town were the competitions most successful club until Bluebell United equalled their record in 1999–2000 and Avondale United surpassed it in 2013–14. The reserve teams of League of Ireland clubs have also won the cup on several occasions. These include Bohemians, Shelbourne, Drumcondra and St Patrick's Athletic. Limerick B and UCD Reserves were also runners up.

=== 2000s and 2010s ===
During the late 2000s and 2010s Avondale United and Crumlin United were the cup's most successful clubs. In 2013–14 Avondale United became only the second club after Distillery to win the cup four times in a row. In 2012 the FAI introduced a new cup, the Tom Hand Memorial Cup, which saw the winners of the FAI Intermediate Cup play off against the winners of the FAI Junior Cup. Avondale United won the inaugural match, defeating Sheriff Y.C. 2–1 at the AUL Complex. In 2014 it was announced that future finals would be hosted at the Aviva Stadium. The 2014–15 and 2015–16 finals were both played as double headers along with the FAI Junior Cup finals.

== Finals ==
Season	Winner	Score	Runner-up	Venue
2026	Cobh Wanderers	1–0	St. Mary's A.F.C.	Turners Cross, Cork
2024–25	College Corinthians	2–1 (a.e.t.)	Ringmahon Rangers	Turners Cross, Cork
2023–24	Glebe North	3–2 (a.e.t.)	Ringmahon Rangers	Weavers Park, Drogheda
2022–23	Rockmount	1–1 (a.e.t.); 4–3 (pen.)	Cockhill Celtic	The Showgrounds, Sligo
2021–22	Rockmount	2–0	Bluebell United	Turners Cross, Cork
2020–21	Unfinished due to Coronavirus pandemic			
2019–20	St. Mochta's	2–1	Killester Donnycarney	Tallaght Stadium, Dublin
2018–19	Avondale United	1–0	Crumlin United	Aviva Stadium, Dublin
2017–18	Maynooth University Town	4–1 (a.e.t.)	Firhouse Clover F.C.	Aviva Stadium
2016–17	Liffey Wanderers	2–2 (a.e.t.); 5–4 (pen.)	Cobh Wanderers	Aviva Stadium
2015–16	Crumlin United	5–0	Letterkenny Rovers	Aviva Stadium
2014–15	Crumlin United	4–0	Tolka Rovers	Aviva Stadium
2013–14	Avondale United	3–0	UCD Reserves	Turners Cross
2012–13	Avondale United	4–1	Bluebell United	Richmond Park
2011–12	Avondale United	2–1 (a.e.t.)	Cherry Orchard	Tallaght Stadium
2010–11	Avondale United	1–0 (a.e.t.)	Cherry Orchard	Turners Cross
2009–10	Crumlin United	3–1	Avondale United	Dalymount Park
2008–09	Crumlin United	3–2	Bluebell United	Tallaght Stadium
2007–08	Rockmount	2–0	Douglas Hall	Turners Cross
2006–07	Avondale United	1–0	Bangor Celtic	Turners Cross
2005–06	Avondale United	1–0	Blarney United	
2004–05	Wayside Celtic	1–0	Rockmount	Carlisle Grounds
2003–04	Rockmount		Bluebell United	Richmond Park
2002–03	Belgrove (Dublin)		Rockmount	Turners Cross
Replay	Belgrove (Dublin)	2–1	Rockmount	Whitehall Stadium
2001–02	Ashtown Villa	4–1	Cherry Orchard	Dalymount Park
2000–01	Wayside Celtic	1–0	Ashtown Villa	Dalymount Park
1999–2000	Bluebell United		St. Mary's A.F.C.	
1998–99	Rockmount	2–0	Garda	Turners Cross
1997–98	Cherry Orchard	2–1	College Corinthians	
1996–97	Glenmore Celtic (Dublin)	1–0	Everton	Turners Cross
1995–96	Wayside Celtic		Fanad United	
1994–95	Fanad United	1–0	College Corinthians	Terryland Park
1993–94	Bluebell United		Cherry Orchard	TBC
1992–93	Bluebell United		Wayside Celtic	
1991–92	Pegasus (Dublin)		Bluebell United	
1990–91	Edenmore	2–0	St Joseph's Boys (Sallynoggin)	Tolka Park
1989–90	Bluebell United		Ballyfermot United (Ballyfermot)	
1988–89	T.E.K. United	1–0	St. James's Gate	Dalymount Park
1987–88	Fanad United	1–0	Tramore Athletic	Dalymount Park
1986–87	Tramore Athletic		Bank Rovers (Dublin)	
1985–86	Crofton Celtic (Cork)		Everton	
1984–85	Bank Rovers (Dundalk)		Hammond Lane (Dublin)	
1983–84	Ballyfermot United (Ballyfermot)		Bank Rovers (Dublin)	
1982–83	Cobh Ramblers		Bluebell United	
1981–82	Bluebell United		Tramore Athletic	
1980–81	Tramore Athletic		Ballyfermot United (Ballyfermot)	
1979–80	Cobh Ramblers		Tramore Athletic	
1978–79	Tramore Athletic		Swilly Rovers (Ramelton)	
1977–78	Avondale United		AIB	
1976–77	Pegasus (Dublin)		Bray Wanderers	
1975–76	St. Brendans CIE		Transport	
1974–75	CYM Terenure (Terenure)		Belgrove (Dublin)	
1973–74	Transport		T.E.K. United	
1972–73	Dalkey United (Dalkey)		Rialto (Dublin)	
1971–72	CYM Terenure (Terenure)		T.E.K. United	
1970–71	Tullamore Town		Bluebell United	
1969–70	Rialto (Dublin)		Home Farm	
1968–69	Longford Town		Transport	
1967–68	Home Farm	0–0	Athlone Town	St Mel's Park
Replay	Home Farm	1–0	Athlone Town	Tolka Park
1966–67	Home Farm		Tramore Athletic	
1965–66	Transport		Home Farm	
1964–65	T.E.K. United		Glasheen (Glasheen)	
1963–64	Transport		T.E.K. United	
1962–63	Home Farm		Limerick B	
1961–62	Longford Town		Home Farm	
1960–61	Workmen's Club		Jacobs	
1959–60	Longford Town		Bray Wanderers	
1958–69	Albert Rovers	3–2	Bray Wanderers	Rutland Avenue
1957–58	Bray Wanderers	3–2	Chapelizod (Chapelizod)	
1956–57	Workmen's Club	2–1	AOH	Turners Cross
1955–56	Bray Wanderers		Workmen's Club	
1954–55	Longford Town		Workmen's Club	
1953–54	Albert Rovers		Jacobs	
1952–53	St Patrick's Athletic Reserves		Jacobs	
1951–52	AOH		Pike Rovers	
1950–51	St. James's Gate		Evergreen United	
1949–50	Jacobs		St Patricks Athletic	
1948–49	St Patrick's Athletic		Freebooters (Cork)	
1947–48	St Patrick's Athletic		Cobh Ramblers	
1946–47	Drumcondra B		Rockville (Cork)	
1944–45	UCD	4–2	Cobh Ramblers	Dalymount Park
1941–42	Distillery (Dublin)		Cobh Ramblers	
1940–41	Distillery (Dublin)		Cork Bohemians	
1939–40	Distillery (Dublin)		Cobh Ramblers	
1938–39	Distillery (Dublin)		Cork Bohemians	
1937–38	Terenure Athletic		Cork Bohemians	
1936–37	Longford Town		Fearon's Athletic	
1935–36	B and ISP		G.S. Rlys (Cork)	
1934–35	Tramore Rookies		Bohemians Reserves	
1933–34	Sligo Rovers		Tramore Rookies	
1932–33	Shelbourne B		Cork Bohemians	
1931–32	Bohemians Reserves		Cork Bohemians	
1930–31	Cork Bohemians		Rossville	
1929–30	Cahir Park (Cahir)	4–2	Glasnevin (Glasnevin)	TBA
1928–29	Richmond United		Fermoy (Fermoy)	
1927–28	Cork Bohemians		Strandville	
1926–27	Drumcondra		Cobh Ramblers	

== List of winners by club ==
Club	Titles	Seasons
Avondale United	8	1977–78, 2005–06, 2006–07, 2010–11, 2011–12, 2012–13, 2013–14, 2018–19
Rockmount	5	1998–99, 2003–04, 2007–08, 2021-22, 2022-2023
Bluebell United	5	1981–82, 1989–90, 1992–93, 1993–94, 1999–2000
Longford Town	5	1936–37, 1954–55, 1959–60, 1961–62, 1968–69
Crumlin United	4	2008–09, 2009–10, 2014–15, 2015–16
Distillery (Dublin)	4	1938–39, 1939–40, 1940–41, 1941–42
Home Farm	3	1962–63, 1966–67, 1967–68
St Patrick's Athletic	3	1947–48, 1948–49, 1952–53
Tramore Athletic	3	1978–79, 1980–81, 1986–87
Transport	3	1963–64, 1965–66, 1973–74
Wayside Celtic	3	1995–96, 2000–01, 2004–05
Albert Rovers	2	1953–54, 1958–59
Bray Wanderers	2	1955–56, 1957–58
Cobh Ramblers	2	1979–80, 1982–83
Cork Bohemians	2	1927–28, 1930–31
CYM Terenure (Terenure)	2	1971–72, 1974–75
Drumcondra	2	1926–27, 1946–47
Fanad United	2	1987–88, 1994–95
Pegasus (Dublin)	2	1976–77, 1991–92
T.E.K. United	2	1964–65, 1988–89
Workmen's Club	2	1956–57, 1960–61
AOH	1	1951–52
Ashtown Villa	1	2001–02
Ballyfermot United (Ballyfermot)	1	1983–84
Bank Rovers (Dundalk)	1	1984–85
Belgrove (Dublin)	1	2002–03
Bohemians Reserves	1	1931–32
B and ISP	1	1935–36
Cahir Park (Cahir)	1	1929–30
Cherry Orchard	1	1997–98
Cobh Wanderers	1	2026
College Corinthians	1	2024–25
Crofton Celtic (Cork)	1	1985–86
Dalkey United (Dalkey)	1	1972–73
Edenmore	1	1990–91
Glenmore Celtic (Dublin)	1	1996–97
Jacobs	1	1949–50
Liffey Wanderers	1	2016–2017
Maynooth University Town	1	2017–18
Rialto (Dublin)	1	1969–70
Richmond United	1	1928–29
St. Brendans CIE	1	1975–76
St James's Gate	1	1950–51
Shelbourne B	1	1932–33
Sligo Rovers	1	1933–34
Terenure Athletic	1	1937–38
Tramore Rookies	1	1934–35
Tullamore Town	1	1970–71
UCD	1	1945–46
