= 1936–37 FAI Cup =

1936-37 FAI Cup
Tournament details
- Country: Ireland
- Dates: 9 January – 18 April 1937
- Teams: 16

Final positions
- Champions: Waterford
- Runners-up: St James's Gate

Tournament statistics
- Matches played: 20
- Goals scored: 74 (3.7 per match)

The FAI Cup 1936–37^{[A]} was the sixteenth awarding of Ireland's premier cup competition prize, The Football Association of Ireland Challenge Cup or FAI Cup. The tournament began on 9 January 1937 and concluded on 18 April with the final held at Dalymount Park, Dublin. An official attendance^{[B]} of 24,000 people watched Waterford, captained by Tom Arrigan, claim their first FAI Cup title by defeating St James's Gate.

== First round ==
| Tie no | Home team | Score | Away team | Date |
|---|---|---|---|---|
| 1 | Fearon's Athletic | 4-1 | Bray Unknowns | 9 January 1937 |
| 2 | Shelbourne | 1-1 | St James's Gate | 9 January 1937 |
| replay | St James's Gate | 4-2 | Shelbourne | 13 January 1937 |
| 3 | Cork | 3-2 | Queen's Park | 10 January 1937 |
| 4 | Drumcondra | 1-1 | Brideville | 10 January 1937 |
| replay | Drumcondra | 3-2 | Brideville | 13 January 1937 |
| 5 | Longford Town | 2-1 | Evergreen United | 10 January 1937 |
| 6 | Shamrock Rovers | 1-0 | Dolphin | 10 January 1937 |
| 7 | Sligo Rovers | 6-1 | Bohemians | 10 January 1937 |
| 8 | Waterford | 3-3 | Dundalk | 10 January 1937 |
| replay | Dundalk | 1-1 | Waterford | 14 January 1937 |
| replay(2) | Waterford | 3-1 | Dundalk | 21 January 1937 |

== Second round ==
| Tie no | Home team | Score | Away team | Date |
|---|---|---|---|---|
| 1 | Cork | 0-0^{[C]} | Fearon's Athletic | 7 February 1937 |
| refix^{[C]} | Cork | 0-1 | Fearon's Athletic | 10 February 1937 |
| 2 | Longford Town | 2-1 | Drumcondra | 7 February 1937 |
| 3 | St James's Gate | 6-2 | Sligo Rovers | 7 February 1937 |
| 4 | Waterford | 2-0 | Shamrock Rovers | 7 February 1937 |

== Semi-finals ==
10 March, 1937

| Waterford | 4–1 | Longford Town |
|---|---|---|
| O' Keeffe; Arrigan; J. Walsh; Phelan | | P. Clarke |

Dalymount Park, Dublin

21 March, 1937

| St James's Gate | 4–0 | Fearon's Athletic |
|---|---|---|
| W. Byrne(3); Comerford |

Dalymount Park, Dublin

== Final ==
18 April, 1937

| Waterford | 2–1 | St James's Gate |
|---|---|---|
| Noonan 35'; O' Keeffe 75' | | Merry 80' |

Dalymount Park, Dublin
Attendance: 24,000

Winner of FAI Cup 1936–37
Waterford
1st Title

== Notes ==
A. From 1923 to 1936, the FAI Cup was known as the Free State Cup.

B. Attendances were calculated using gate receipts which limited their accuracy as a large proportion of people, particularly children, attended football matches in Ireland throughout the 20th century for free by a number of means.

C. ^{a} Fixture abandoned after 55 minutes due to bad weather. Re-Fixture played on 10 February.
