= Fearon's Athletic =

- Full name: Fearon's Athletic F.C. (1936–1937); Terenure Athletic F.C. (1936-1952)
- Founded: 1936
- Dissolved: 1940
- Ground: Green Lanes; Terenure, Dublin
- League: League of Ireland; Leinster Senior League

Fearon's Athletic Football Club was an Irish association football club. During the 1930s they played in both the Leinster Senior League and participated in the FAI Intermediate Cup. They were later known as Terenure Athletic F.C. before merging with Brideville F.C.

== Fearsons Athletic ==
The club was formed in 1936 by the P.P. Fearon's building firm based in Crumlin, a neighbourhood in Dublin's north inner-city. The connection with their parent company was represented by the club's large crest which featured a ladder and plank on a white shield, in an ‘X’ formation. Almost immediately, they applied for membership of the League of Ireland. Reds United has resigned their place and both Fearson's and Shelbourne applied to replace them. Ultimately the Free State League Management Committee voted unanimously in favour of the Ringsend club, and Fearson's were consigned to the Leinster Senior League.

Fearson's entered the Leinster Senior League Senior Division for the 1936–37 season, and got off to a hugely successful start. Under the management of Christy Robinson, and with a squad that included Hookey Leonard, they won the division at the first time of asking and that same season, marched all the way to the FAI Cup, then called the Challenge Cup. The cup run included a 4-1 thumping of Bray Unknowns in front of 2,500 fans at Green Lanes. Cork were then dispatched in the quarter-finals, 1–0 in a replay of an abandoned tie. St James's Gate would end the fairytale, dispatching Fearson's 4–0 at Dalymount Park on March 21, 1937. In the Free State Intermediate Cup, Fearson's reached the final, only to be bested by Longford Town.

== Terenure Athletic ==
Fearon's changed their name to Terenure Athletic ahead of the 1937–38 season. That year they achieved further success, winning the FAI Intermediate Cup. Cork Bohemians being hammered 4–1 at Dalymount Park.

In 1939, they merged with Brideville F.C., of the League of Ireland. Although initially being registered as Brideville and Terenure Athletic Football Club, Ltd, and playing home games at Terenure's home ground, Green Lanes, the club ceased to exist and was consumed by the larger entity.

== Home Ground ==
The club established a home ground, Green Lanes, for itself on Greenlea Road in Terenure, adjacent to the grounds of Terenure College. Valued at around £3,000 it was one of the most ambitious stadiums of the time for a Leinster Senior League Club. Today it serves as the home stadium of Terenure College RFC.

== Notable players ==
- (Scotland) Hookey Leonard
- (Republic of Ireland) Jeremiah Robinson

== Notable managers ==
- (Republic of Ireland) Christy Robinson

== Honours ==
- Leinster Senior Division: 1
  - 1936–37
- FAI Intermediate Cup: 1
  - 1937-38
