= Hookey Leonard =

Scottish footballer

Personal information
- Full name: James Leonard
- Date of birth: 1906
- Place of birth: Paisley, Scotland
- Date of death: 1959 (aged 52–53)
- Place of death: United States
- Position: Inside left

Youth career
- –1923: Saltcoats Victoria

Senior career*
Years	Team	Apps	(Gls)
1923–1926	Cowdenbeath	70	(37)
1926–1927	Indiana Flooring	15	(8)
1927–1928	Cowdenbeath	27	(15)
1928–1930	New York Nationals	74	(49)
1930	Cowdenbeath	8	(6)
1930–1931	Sunderland	26	(17)
- Rhyl Athletic
- Colwyn Bay United
1932	Sunderland	9	(2)
	Morton	7	(1)
- Shelbourne
- Shamrock Rovers
- Dolphin
- Fearon's Athletic
- Brideville
- Shelbourne
- * Club domestic league appearances and goals

James "Hookey" or "Hooky" Leonard (1906–1959) was a Scottish professional footballer.

Leonard signed with Cowdenbeath in 1923. He quickly became a club favourite with brilliant performances. However, during the 1924–25 season, he was suspended after missing several training sessions. Leonard was the third leading scorer in the Scottish League during the 1925–26 season, but shocked the team and league when he signed with Indiana Flooring of the American Soccer League in December 1926. He played fifteen league games, scoring eight goals, through the remainder of 1926–27. Leonard returned to Cowdenbeath for the 1927–28 season but was back in the U.S., this time with the New York Nationals. He remained with the Nationals through the 1929–30 season, then returned again to Cowdenbeath. The team then sold his contract to English club Sunderland for £3,000. He made 35 appearances and scored 19 goals in two spells with the club. In October 1932, Leonard joined Morton, his final Scottish League club.

Leonard may have ended his footballing career in the Irish League playing for Shelbourne in 1933–34, Shamrock Rovers in 1934–35, Dolphin in 1935–36, Fearons A, Brideville in 1938–39 and Shelborne in 1939–40. Note that the birth & death dates given are 7 October 1904 in Paisley and 7 September 1959 which differ from those above.

Leonard's exploits are chronicled in Ron Ferguson's Black Diamonds and the Blue Brazil. He was recently elected into the Cowdenbeath Hall of Fame. After retiring, Leonard settled in the US with his family. In July 2003 his family visited Cowdenbeath to receive a commemorative scroll.
