= Nicky Broujos =

American soccer player

Personal information
- Full name: Nicholas Broujos
- Date of birth: 22 June 1963 (age 63)
- Place of birth: Pennsylvania, United States
- Position: Goalkeeper

Senior career*
| Years | Team | Apps | (Gls) |
- Bray Wanderers
- → T.E.K. United (loan)
| 1985–1986 | Shelbourne | | |
| 1987–1988 | Bray Wanderers | | |
| 1988–1989 | St Patrick's Athletic | | |
| 1988–1989 | → Maryland Bays (loan) | | |
| 1989–1993 | Sligo Rovers | | |
| 1990 | → Penn-Jersey Spirit (loan) | | |
| 1993–1994 | Cliftonville | | |
| 1994–2001 | Sligo Rovers | | |
- * Club domestic league appearances and goals

Nicholas Broujos (22 June 1963) is an American retired soccer player who played as a goalkeeper.
