= Strandville F.C. =

Irish soccer (association football) club

Strandville
- Full name: Strandville Football Club
- Nickname: the Tigers
- Ground: Croydon Park; Dublin
- League: League of Ireland; Leinster Senior League

Strandville Football Club was an Irish association football club. During the 1930s they played in both the Leinster Senior League and participated in the FAI Intermediate Cup and prior to the partition of Ireland the Irish Intermediate Cup.

== History ==
Strandville took their name from Strandville Avenue off Dublin’s North Strand The club may have played at a number of locations, but a December 1915 issue of The Workers Republic magazine advertised that Stranville would be playing a League match against Bohemians at Croydon Park. Richmond Park would later be home to St. Patrick's Athletic.

Future Ireland international, Manchester United wing-half, and Barcelona manager Patrick O'Connell also played for Strandville's junior team in his youth. Future Irish Government Minister Oscar Traynor also played for Strandville in the early 1900s. He would also later play for Belfast Celtic and fight in the Irish War of Independence. Traynor left Strandville to sign with Frankfort along with teammate Joe Wickham who would later become General Secretary of the Football Association of Ireland.

In May 1907 they defeated St. Werburgh's FC to claim the Leinster Junior League. In 1917 they won the Irish Intermediate Cup. In 1927–28, the club reached the final of the FAI Intermediate Cup, losing to Cork Bohemians.

The club played in the first ever recorded soccer match at Richmond Park when they took on Inchicore Athletic in an October 1921 Leinster Junior Cup tie. Richmond Park would later be home to St. Patrick's Athletic.

== Notable players ==
- (Kingdom of Ireland) Oscar Traynor
- (Kingdom of Ireland) Joe Wickham
- (Kingdom of Ireland) Patrick O'Connell (footballer)

== Honours ==
- Leinster Junior League: 1
  - 1906–07
- Irish Intermediate Cup: 1
  - 1916-17
