= Greystones A.F.C. =

Former association football club based in Greystones, Ireland

- Full name: Greystones Association Football Club
- Founded: 1924
- Dissolved: 2015 (merged with Greystones United)
- Ground: Archfield
Home colours

Greystones A.F.C. were an Irish association football club from Greystones, County Wicklow. They qualified for the FAI Cup in 2002 and 2011, reaching the third round of the 2011 FAI Cup, where they played Shelbourne.

Founded in 1924, Greystones A.F.C. amalgamated with local neighbours, Greystones United, in 2015 to form Greystones United A.F.C.

== History ==
=== Foundation ===
Greystones A.F.C. was founded in 1924, after a group of local teenagers came together to form the town's first football team. The first meeting was held in the kitchen of Hugh and Henry Lawless in May 1923; their house was located on North Beach, close to the marina. In addition to the Lawless brothers, the founding players included Tom Quinn, Larry Byrne and Frankie Ward. By the following year, the team had joined the Dublin Boys Realm League, held every Sunday in the Phoenix Park. With no Sunday bus service, players relied on a boat, then a train and finally a tram to get to matches in the Phoenix Park.

=== Early years ===
The club initially moved around Greystones, even playing in Delgany at one point, before settling on their home ground of Archfield in 1936. In 1947, the club joined the newly formed Wicklow League. Their club colours were red with a black and white trim. However, the 1960s brought a period of decline and the club nearly folded. Volunteers Pat Smith and Willie Wall kept the club alive, helping it grow again throughout the 1970s and 80s. In 1993, Greystones A.F.C. entered the Leinster Senior League Major Sunday Division and, from there, climbed through the ranks.

=== Later years ===
In 2000, the club won a treble of the George Moore Cup, the Finches Gilligan Cup and Division 1A of the Leinster Senior League. Greystones was also named the league’s 'Most Progressive Club' for the 2000–01 season. The club made it to the second round of the FAI Cup in 2002, where they were drawn at home to Sligo Rovers. Despite a defensive performance that drew praise, Greystones lost the match 1–0.

In May 2005, the club won promotion to the Leinster Senior League's top division, the Senior Division. After finishing sixth in the league, a major milestone came in 2006 when the club won the Metropolitan Cup.

In 2011, Greystones reached the third round of the FAI Cup, where they were drawn against League of Ireland side Shelbourne. An attendance of 600 at the Carlisle Grounds saw Shelbourne win the match 3–1. Greystones returned to the top division of the Leinster Senior League for the 2014–15 season and finished eleventh, one place above the relegation spots.

Before the merger, the club had two teams; one that played in the Sunday Senior 1 division of the Leinster Senior League and the other in the Saturday Major 1 division of the Leinster Senior League.

=== Merger ===
In 2015, Greystones A.F.C. amalgamated with local neighbours, Greystones United, to form Greystones United A.F.C. The club's traditional colours of red and black were adopted as the new club's alternative kit and the Leinster Senior League team, at the time competing in the top division, assumed the new name.

== Rivalries ==
Until the merger of the clubs in 2015, Greystones AFC shared a rivalry with local neighbours Greystones United.
