= Keith Dunne =

Irish footballer

Personal information
- Date of birth: 10 February 1982 (age 44)
- Place of birth: Dublin, Republic of Ireland
- Positions: Winger; forward

Youth career
- 1997: Verona

Senior career*
Years	Team	Apps	(Gls)
1997–1999	Verona		
1999–2003	Thomas University Nighthawks		
2003	Ashtown Villa	22	(18)
2003–2006	St Patrick's Athletic		
2006–2007	Dundalk	44	(4)
2008	Shelbourne	9	(1)
2008–2009	Phoenix		
- Tolka Rovers
?–2011	Glebe North		
2011	Corduff		
2011–	Sheriff Y.C.		
- * Club domestic league appearances and goals

Keith Dunne (born 10 February 1982) is an Irish footballer. Dunne is a versatile right sided winger who can play on either wing and he also has experience playing as a striker.

== Career ==
Keith was born in Dublin and played with junior side, Verona, before moving to the United States to take up a place on a soccer scholarship in 1999. There, he played college football in Atlanta, before returning home to Dublin where he played with another junior club, Ashtown Villa. Keith was quickly snapped up by then St. Patrick's Athletic manager, Eamon Collins in March 2003, and made a number of appearances for the Saints over three seasons in the Premier Division. During his time with Pats, he played in the 2003 FAI Cup Final against Longford Town at Lansdowne Road, a game they lost 2–0. Earlier that season Dunne played a part in beating the same opposition helping Pats to victory in the 2003 League of Ireland Cup Final.

Dunne, with over 70 appearances under his belt in the top flight, then left Richmond Park in January 2006 to spend time with his family in America, before once again returning to his native shores. And he soon found himself back in the League of Ireland, when ex-St. Pats coach, Gerry Scully invited the Blanchardstown-based player to join him at Dundalk.

In his first season at Dundalk, he helped the club to second place in the 2006 First Division and a 3–2 playoff win over Waterford United. In the 2007 season, Dunne again was a regular in the Dundalk first team helping them to the top of the table by mid-season. However, a decline in Dundalk's form saw the Lilywhites finish 3rd in the First Division table and they were eventually defeated by Finn Harps in a one off 2nd vs 3rd place play-off to decide who would play Waterford United for a Premier Division spot.

Dunne was released at the end of the 2007 season by Dundalk but within a week he signed for Shelbourne on 29 November 2007. Dunne made his Shelbourne debut during a League of Ireland Cup 1st round tie on 24 March 2008 against Sporting Fingal at Morton Stadium, a match Shelbourne won 6–5 on penalties after a 2–2 draw after extra-time. He scored his first Shelbourne goal during a 5–0 league victory over Kildare County at Tolka Park on 16 May 2008. Dunne departed Shelbourne mid-way through the 2008 season. He made 11 league and cup appearances for Shels, scoring 1 goal in the process. He later joined Leinster Senior League side Phoenix F.C.before moving on to Tolka Rovers and Glebe North.

In July 2011 Keith joined Athletic Union League Premier A side Corduff FC where he was appointed Captain from his first pre-season game. Dunne started the season in flying form scoring goals on a regular basis for Corduff. In November on the back of some excellent performances for both Corduff and the AUL Oscar Traynor Panel where he scored 6 goals in 2 games he was "approached" by follow AUL Side Sheriff Y.C. to join them, he transferred to YC in Dec 2011 but has yet to play any games for them due to Injury. In January 2012 rumours have started that Dunne may return to Corduff for the rest of the season due to differences with the Manager of YC.

Cousin of Jason McGuinness.

== Honours ==
- League of Ireland Cup: 1
  - 2003 – St. Patrick's Athletic
