= Brian Fitzgerald (footballer) =

Australian rules footballer

Personal information
- Full name: Brian Fitzgerald
- Born: 29 December 1927
- Died: 3 July 2013 (aged 85)
- Original team: St Mary's (VCFL)
- Height: 185 cm (6 ft 1 in)
- Weight: 80 kg (176 lb)

Playing career^{1}
Years	Club	Games (Goals)
1947	Geelong	5 (0)
- ^{1} Playing statistics correct to the end of 1947.

Brian Fitzgerald (29 December 1927 – 3 July 2013) was an Australian rules footballer who played with Geelong in the Victorian Football League (VFL).
