= Greystones United A.F.C. =

Greystones United
- Full name: Greystones United Association Football Club
- Nickname: The Seahorses
- Founded: 1924 (as Greystones A.F.C.); 1969 (as Greystones United)
- Ground: Archfield, Greystones; Woodlands, Greystones
- League: Leinster Senior League; Wicklow & District Football League; Women's Under 17 National League
- Website: www.guafc.ie
Home colours

Greystones United Association Football Club is an Irish football club located in Greystones, County Wicklow. The club's teams compete in the Dublin District Schoolboys/girls League (DDSL), Wicklow District Football League (WDFL), and Leinster Senior League (LSL).

A successor entity to former football clubs Greystones A.F.C. and Greystones United, the club previously qualified for the FAI Cup in 2002, 2011 and 2017.

== History ==
=== Foundation ===
Greystones United A.F.C. can trace its origins back to 1923 when a group of local teenagers met in North Beach to form the town's first association football team, Greystones A.F.C. Founding members included Tom Quinn, Larry Byrne, Frankie Ward and Henry Lawless, who hosted the meeting. By 1924, the club had entered a team into the Dublin Boys Realm League in the Phoenix Park.

=== Early years ===
Although Greystones A.F.C. would join the Wicklow League in 1947, the club experienced a period of decline in the 1960s. However, demand at underage level continued to grow and another club, Greystones United, was founded in 1969. Greystones Schoolboys was set up in 1981 by Brendan Walsh and John Dunne and, in 1987, these two clubs merged to form Greystones United F.C. Starting with four youth teams playing at Darcy’s Field, the club grew steadily under the leadership of their volunteers and, by 2008, it had ten schoolboy teams in the Wicklow League and a senior team in the Leinster Senior League.

=== Merger ===
In 2012, Greystones United withdrew from the Wicklow & District League due to their inability to field a team. 2015 saw the amalgamation of Greystones United F.C. and town neighbours Greystones A.F.C. The United name was kept and applied to the team competing in the top division of the Leinster Senior League. The club retained their traditional colours of green and white, with red and black as their alternative colour.

=== Post-amalgamation ===
The club qualified for the preliminary round of the 2017 FAI Cup, losing 0–3 at home to Sheriff YC. In 2018, Greystones became one of the founding clubs of the Women's Under-17 National League. In 2019, the club was featured in an episode of Liverpool F.C.'s Training S.O.S. The programme, in which Jason McAteer attempts to help amateur teams, was a two-part documentary released on Liverpool's Youtube channel.

In 2022, Greystones United AFC entered into a partnership with Bray Wanderers for the Women’s League of Ireland. The partnership enables Greystones to field women's Under-17 and Under-19 teams in the LOI Academy leagues. In 2024, the partnership with Bray Wanderers was extended to Greystones' schoolboys teams as well.

== Grounds ==
The club's senior men's team play their Leinster Senior League games at Archfield. Before the two clubs merged, Greystones A.F.C. played at Archfield, a pitch colloquially known as "The Bog" for its soft ground. Greystones United played at Darcy’s Field, where the club built its youth reputation.

In 2003, a new home was secured at Woodlands. Preparatory work began in 2005, and the first match was played there in May 2006. Woodlands is the main base of the club, featuring a full-size all-weather pitch, modern clubhouse and multiple playing fields. Archfield still supports training and matches.

== Rivalries ==
Until the merger of the clubs in 2015, Greystones United had a rivalry with town neighbours Greystones A.F.C.

The Women's U17 team have a rivalry with Bray Wanderers.

Within the Wicklow League, Greystones have a rivalry with Newtown United.

== Notable former players ==
=== Internationals ===
Republic of Ireland internationals

- (Republic of Ireland) Paul McShane

Republic of Ireland under-21 internationals

- (Republic of Ireland) Simon Power

=== Other ===
- (Republic of Ireland) Daniel Whelan, Green Bay Packers
