= Rob Rogers (referee) =

Irish football and futsal referee

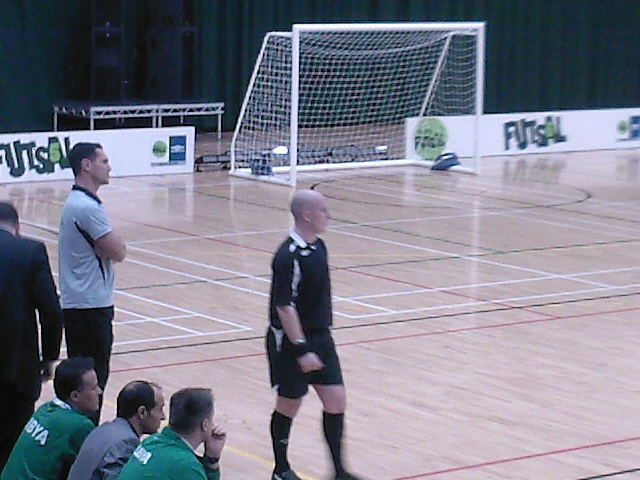
- Full name: Robert Rogers
- Born: 12 November 1983 (age 42)

Domestic
Years	League	Role
2005-?	League of Ireland	Assistant referee
2007-	League of Ireland	Referee

International
Years	League	Role
2009-?	FIFA listed	Futsal referee
2012	FIFA listed	Football referee

Robert Rogers (born 12 November 1983) is a referee in football and futsal.

== Football refereeing ==
Rogers was appointed to the National League panel of referees in 2005 as an assistant referee. Rogers took charge of his first League of Ireland match in 2007 in which Athlone Town beat Kildare County by 4 goals to 2.

He became FIFA-listed as a referee in 2012.

== Futsal refereeing ==
Rob Rogers was appointed to the FIFA International List for Futsal Referees for the 2009 season. In doing so he became the first referee from Ireland to hold this position.

He has officiated at the Four Nations championship held in England in December 2008, taking charge of the opening fixture between Libya and Lithuania and the final match between hosts England and Libya before a packed house in Loughborough.

- Rogers was appointed to the preliminary qualifying stages of the UEFA Futsal Championship in February 2009
- Rob Rogers was appointed to the 2009–10 UEFA Futsal Cup Preliminary Group F held in Austria, August 2009
- Rob Rogers was appointed as Second Referee to the inaugural FAI Futsal Cup final in 2007 in which Shamrock Rovers beat UCD.
- Rob Rogers was appointed as First Referee at the FAI Futsal Cup final in 2009 held at the National Basketball Arena. Cork City beat defending Champions St. Patrick's Athletic.
