= Wicklow & District Football League =

- Founded: 1940s
- Country: (Republic of Ireland) Ireland
- Region: County Wicklow
- Divisions: Andy McEvoy Premier 1 Division 1 Division 2 Jim McLaughlin Group A Jim McLaughlin Group B John Tobin Youth League
- Level on pyramid: 8–10
- Domestic cup(s): FAI Junior Cup; Leinster Senior Cup
- League cup(s): Wicklow Cup; Harry Griffith Cup; Charlie Bishop Cup; Jim McLaughlin Premier Trophy
- Current champions: St. Anthony's (2025–26)
- Website: wdflgrassroots.com

The Wicklow & District Football League (WDFL) is an association football league featuring amateur and junior clubs from County Wicklow. The WDFL is a winter league with a schedule that runs from September to May. The league's top division, the Andy McEvoy Premier 1, is a part of the eighth tier in the Republic of Ireland football league system.

The WDFL organise an over-35s cup competition, known as the Harry Griffith Cup, with support from the Amateur Football League (AFL) as all participants are members of the AFL. The Wicklow Cup is a knockout competition contested by all teams across the WDFL's divisions.

== History ==
The Wicklow and District Football League was formed in the 1940s, although sources differ on the exact year, with 1947, 1948 and 1949 all mentioned as the year of foundation. By the 1950s, the league was mainly made up of teams from south Dublin including Wayside Celtic and T.E.K. United. Wayside Celtic won the league in 1959. The top division of junior football in Wicklow is named after former Irish player Andy McEvoy.

== League pyramid ==
The Wicklow & District Football League (WDFL) has three divisions. There are also two underage divisions in the WDFL; the Youths Premier and the Youths Division 1. Although there is no over-35 division, the WDFL organise an over-35s cup competition, known as the Harry Griffith Cup, with support from the Amateur Football League (AFL) with all participants being members of the AFL.

As of November 2024, there is no promotion or relegation system between the WDFL and the Leinster Senior League. Junior clubs can apply to join the intermediate ranks if they feel they are capable, starting at the lowest intermediate division.

Pyramid Level	League(s) / division(s)
8	WDFL Premier Division 10 clubs – 2 relegations
9	WDFL Division 1 11 clubs – 2 promotions, 1 relegation
10	WDFL Division 3 9 clubs – 2 promotions

== Premier Division Clubs ==
=== 2023–24 Season ===
2023/24 Clubs
Team	Hometown/suburb	Ground
Arklow Town	Arklow	Travers Insurance Park
Arklow United	Arklow	Arklow Credit Union Park
St. Peter's	Bray	Fassaroe Community Centre
St. Anthony's	Kilcoole	Finn Park
Shamrock Celtic	Rathnew	Shamrock Park
Wicklow Rovers	Wicklow	Whitegates
Avonmore	Rathdrum	Ballygannon
Ashford Rovers	Ashford	Ballinalea Park
Newtown United	Newtownmountkennedy	Matt Kelly Community Grounds
Glencormac United	Kilmacanogue	Sean Ryder Park

== List of recent winners ==
Season	Winner	Runners-up
2025–26	St. Anthony's	Rathnew
2024–25	Wicklow Rovers	St. Peter's (Bray)
2023–24	St. Anthony's	St. Peter's (Bray)
2016–17	Rathnew AFC	Newtown United
2015–16	Wicklow Town	Newtown United
2014–15	Ashford Rovers	Newtown United
1967–68	Wicklow Town	
1966–67	Wicklow Town	
1964–65	Wicklow Town	
1963–64	Wicklow Town	
1958–59	Wayside Celtic	
1952–53	Wicklow Town	
1950–51	Wicklow Town	
