= Beggsboro A.F.C. =

- Full name: Beggsboro Athletic Football Club
- Founded: 1938
- Ground: Kilkiernan Road
- League: Leinster Senior League
Home colours

Beggsboro A.F.C. is an Irish association football club based in Cabra, Dublin. They were founded in 1938. The club plays at Kilkiernan Road. Beggsboro compete in the Leinster Senior League. The club competed in the 2013 FAI Cup, but did not make it past the first round.

Beggsboro A.F.C. took its name from a house belonging to the estate's owner. The land in the area was previously located in the Borough of Beggs and the owner of the land had called his residence 'Beggsboro'. The house remains on Fassaugh Road with amber lettering on a black name plate.

== Honours ==
- FAI Junior Cup
  - Winners: 1983–84: 1
  - Runners Up: 1987–88: 1
