= Cobh Wanderers F.C. =

Coordinates: 51°51′39″N 8°17′54″W

Cobh Wanderers
- Full name: Cobh Wanderers Football Club
- Nickname: Wanderers
- Founded: 1925; 101 years ago (as Cove Wanderers); 1981; 45 years ago (as Cobh Wanderers)
- Ground: Old Church Park
- Capacity: 800 (standing)
- Chairman: Frank McCall
- Manager: Stephen Henderson
- League: Munster Senior League Premier Division
Home colours

Cobh Wanderers F.C. is a football club based in Cobh, County Cork. The club, which was originally formed as Cove Wanderers and existed from 1925 until the 1940s, was re-founded in 1981. Their senior men's team competes in the Munster Senior League and have qualified for the FAI Cup on several occasions.

The club play their home games at Old Church Park.

== History ==
=== Previous club (1925 to 1940s) ===
The original club was founded in 1925 as Cove Wanderers. The club's origins came from a district league in Cobh during the 1920s with such teams as Red Rovers, Blue Rovers, Sunny Havanas, Pride of the East and Springfield taking part. Brothers Jack Hurley and Pakie Hurley, both ex-service P.E. instructors, brought together a number of players to form a new club, Cove Wanderers, to compete in this league.

In their early history, Wanderers had no permanent clubhouse or ground and used various pitches in the area. The team started at minor level and won the Cork Minor Cup in 1925–26, beating Sutton 7–0 in the final at Victoria Cross, Cork. The club was a runner-up in both the Minor League and Cup in 1930–31. The following season, they bettered this result by winning the 1931–32 League and Cup, remaining unbeaten in both competitions.

The team later moved up to play at Junior level and, in 1933–1934, reached the final of the Free State Junior Cup. The match was played at Dalymount Park where Wanderers lost 2–1 to B&I Steam Packet with Jerry Walker scoring the Wanderers' solitary goal. In 1934–35, Cobh Wanderers were runners-up in the Junior 2nd Division League. The club achieved further success in 1935–36 when Wanderers beat North End 2–1 in the Cork Area Final of the Munster Junior Cup. The club also played Senior for a couple of seasons before its final demise.

In the 1930s, two of the Wanderers' players were capped for their country at junior level. Dick Barry received his first call-up against Scotland in 1933–34 and later won a second cap versus England in Dublin. Barry went on to play for Cobh Ramblers in the FAI Intermediate Cup finals of 1939–40 and 1941–42. Full back Jim Cotter was capped in 1934–35 against Scotland, joining League of Ireland side Limerick in 1937. Cotter also played for Cork F.C. and Ramblers.

The Wanderers did not survive beyond the 1940s. This was a time of high level unemployment and emigration resulting in an exodus from Cobh which including a large number of the players. As well as this, more members joined the services during the war and eventually the club folded.

=== Wanderers return (1981–1999) ===
When Cobh Wanderers was founded in 1981, home games were initially played in Whitegate. Since then, the club has been able to use facilities at Cobh Community College.

One of the main aims of the club was to purchase their own ground and, in 1993, the club became aware of land that was available for purchase in the Ticknock area. After meetings with the landowner and the local AIB bank, a business plan was drawn up and an agreement was reached to purchase approximately five acres. The club officially took possession of the property in May 1995.

Wanderers decided to develop the land in phases, as and when finances allowed, with a boundary fence the first task completed. Then, in 1996, an application was made for National Lottery funding and a grant was forthcoming. After receiving a further bank loan, work commenced on the development in May 1997. The first official game on the new pitch was a Munster Senior League match against Glasheen on 5 September 1999. Wanderers won 3–1 and Jimmy Hally had the distinction of scoring the first goal at the new ground.

=== Modern era (2000s onwards) ===
In July 2016, the club appointed former Carrigtwohill United manager, Michael Deasy as manager of the senior side. During Deasy's tenure, Cobh won two trophies, the Donie Forde Cup and the Keane Cup.

The 2016–17 season led to a title challenge in the Munster Senior League and two cup runs, in the Beamish Cup and the FAI Intermediate Cup. Wanderers' appearance in the FAI Intermediate Cup decider was the first time they had reached the final in the club's history. Wanderers secured their first trophy of the season when they won the Donie Forde Trophy in January 2017. However, the month of May was bittersweet as Cobh Wanderers were defeated on penalties by Liffey Wanderers in the FAI Intermediate Cup final. They also lost the Beamish Cup final to Ringmahon Rangers and the final league game of the season to eventual Premier Division winners, UCC, meaning they finished as runners up in all three competitions.

In November 2017, Cobh Wanderers won the Keane Cup by defeating Castleview A.F.C. 3–0. It was the first time they had won the trophy in the club's history.

In September 2020, Cobh4Football partnered with the four football clubs in Cobh to announce the development of a new grass pitch and a new artificial turf pitch at Old Church Park, Cobh Wanderers' home ground. The development involved replacing the existing grass pitch with the two new pitches, adding floodlights and allocating pitch use among the four clubs with a long‐term license agreement between Springfield Ramblers and Wanderers for use of the facility. The artificial turf pitch, opened in October 2021, was named the Stephen Ireland AstroTurf pitch after Cobh native, Stephen Ireland, whose transfer fees helped fund the facility In February 2025, the new grass pitch at Old Church Park was completed.

In the 2023–24 season, Cobh Wanderers finished fifth in the Munster Senior League Premier Division. In June 2024, the club announced former Cobh Ramblers player Stephen Henderson as their new manager.

The club narrowly avoided relegation from the Munster Senior League's top division in 2024–25. After 10 defeats in a row left them bottom of the table, Wanderers ended the season with an eight game unbeaten run to maintain their Premier Division status.

== Notable former players ==
=== Internationals ===
Republic of Ireland internationals

- (Republic of Ireland) Tom Burke (Irish footballer)
