= Edenderry Town F.C. =

Edenderry Town
- Full name: Edenderry Town Football Club
- Nickname: Town
- Founded: 1926
- Ground: Fr Paul Park, Edenderry, County Offaly; Paddy Maloney Park, County Offaly
- Capacity: 2000
- Chairman: Seamus kane
- Manager: Niall O’Neill
- League: Leinster Senior League Senior 1 Sunday
Home colours

Edenderry Town F.C. are an association football team from Edenderry, County Offaly. They play in the Leinster Senior League. They were founded in 1926 and have provided senior football since its establishment and underage football to the North Offaly Area for over 25 years. The club has developed rapidly in recent times, playing in the top tier of the Leinster senior league while the core beliefs remain the same.

== History ==
Formed in 1926 by the workers of Aylsbury's Timber factory, one of whom Paddy Maloney was to become the mainstay of soccer in Edenderry.

The first 38 years were a particular struggle, with Paddy almost single-handedly keeping the show going with help at various times from men such as Frank and George Slevin, Willie Donohue, Joe Bergin and a handful of others. During some of those years Edenderry did not play League Football, only entering cup competitions. In 1964 an Extra-Ordinary General Meeting was held in Nolan's hall and a new Committee was formed with Joe Morgan as chairman, John Reid as Secretary and Frank Clarke as Treasurer. Whilst things picked up at this stage the main problem still remained, a settled home pitch to play their matches. During the 1960s, Edenderry Town played football in Pollards field, The Creamery and Fay's field.

The first turning point in the club's History came in 1971, when Paddy Maloney gathered a new look committee around him with Francie McGuinness as Secretary and Paud Maloney as Treasurer. They appointed Tony Maher as Player/ Manager and in their 1st season they won the club's first trophy, the Leinster Counties Cup in Athy on 6 June 1972. From that turning point the club has gone from strength to strength. Edenderry Town won numerous trophies during the 1970s and just as important in 1973 they secured a long-term lease on the old rugby grounds in Derrycoris. So after 47 years the club finally had a home, Fr Paul Park.

In 1982 the Club lost its Chairman when Frank Slevin died. Frank like Paddy Maloney had been a lifelong servant of Edenderry Town. Frank Slevin's only wish was to see Schoolboy's playing organised soccer in Edenderry. In 1983 a major development occurred when the club formed a Schoolboy's section with two team's.... U-12's and U-15's. This decision has had a profound effect on the club ever since with a steady stream of talented players coming through from the schoolboy rank's to senior football. The number of teams increased rapidly and the club now field seven underage team's playing every Saturday. Another feature of the schoolboy section is the Sunday Morning league's, where boy's and girl's from aged 5 years to 10 years play matches on over 40 Sundays of the year. The excitement generated by these games are a major feature of the club today.

The '80s continued with the club winning trophies galore at both Senior and Under-age levels. The club moved to The Leinster Senior League in 1986 and bought 9.5 acres of land adjacent to their leased grounds at Fr Paul Park. Then in 1988 the club was rocked by the untimely death of its Chairman Joe Browne. Joe, as well as being chairman, was also Physio with the 1st Team. In 1989 Edenderry Town's U-12 team clinched the All-Ireland title in Mosney in the Community Games. Again in 1990 Edenderry Town's U-12's reached the All- Ireland Finals in Butlins but were beaten in the quarter-finals.

In 1992 the father figure of the club, Paddy Maloney, died. This was another blow for the club just as plans for a major development were taking place at what we now call, Paddy Maloney Park. Just like all the other club members that had died, Paddy never saw the fruits of his plans for the complex that is there now. Edenderry Town's 1st Team continue to play their football in the Leinster Senior League while our 2nds, 3rds and Youths play in the Kildare League. Another blow for Edenderry Town came in 1998 when Committee Member and U-12 Manager Ollie Morgan died. Ollie was a major fund raiser for the club and his ambition like the rest was to see the major development plan financed and put into action.

== Ground ==
Edenderry's home ground is Paddy Maloney Park, named after the club's founder. The facility houses three grass pitches, including one pitch with floodlights, a floodlit Astro turf pitch and two small-sided pitches.

== Honours ==
=== Kildare League ===
- (Republic of Ireland) Supporter's Cup Winners: 3
  - 2006, 2007, 2008
- (Republic of Ireland) Georgina Donnelly Premier Cup Winners: 2
  - 2006, 2007
- (Republic of Ireland) League Shield Winners: 1
  - 2006
- (Republic of Ireland) Club Of The Year: 1
  - 2007
- (Republic of Ireland) Youth Cup Winners: 1
  - 2007

=== Leinster Senior League ===
- (Republic of Ireland) Premier Division 1a Winners: 1
  - 1987

=== Leinster Junior League ===
- (Republic of Ireland) Counties Cup: 2
  - 1972, 1974
- (Republic of Ireland) Premier League (Counties): 3
  - 1974, 1977, 1978
- (Republic of Ireland) F.A.I. Midland Area: 4
  - 1975,1977, 1981, 1983
- (Republic of Ireland) FAI/LJL Team Of The Year: 2
  - 1984, 1985
- (Republic of Ireland) Sherran Cup: 1
  - 1985
- (Republic of Ireland) Dowdall Cup: 1
  - 1986
- (Republic of Ireland) Leinster Junior League Premier Division: 1
  - 1986
- (Republic of Ireland) Bendal Cup: 1
  - 1987
