= Glenville F.C. =

- Full name: Glenville Football Club
- Founded: 1997
- Ground: Palmerstown Community School
- League: Leinster Senior League
Home colours

Glenville F.C. are a football club from Palmerstown, Dublin City in Ireland. The club plays at Palmerstown Community School. Glenville compete in the Leinster Senior League.

The club colours are white and blue with a home kit of white shirts, blue shorts and blue socks. Established in 1997 by patrons of the Silver Granite pub, the club was reformed in 2000 and entered the Leinster Senior League (LSL) in 2003. The team achieved six promotions in the next six years to make it to the LSL Senior 1A division in 2009.

The club qualified for the 2010 FAI Cup and beat UCC to set up a home draw against the reigning League of Ireland champions Bohemians. Glenville also competed in the FAI Cup in 2013, making it to the last 32. They qualified again in both 2015 and 2017 but failed to make it past the first round on either occasion.
