= Parkvilla F.C. =

Association football club in Navan, Ireland

Parkvilla
- Full name: Parkvilla Football Club
- Founded: 1966
- Ground: Claremont Stadium, Navan
- Chairman: Derek Niven
- Manager: Kenny Ratty
- League: NEFL Premier Division
Home colours

Parkvilla Football Club are an association football club based in Navan, County Meath. As of November 2025, the club's senior men's side competes in the North East Football League's Premier Division and their reserve team competes in Division 2. Parkvilla have qualified for the FAI Cup on multiple occasions, making it to the last 16 in 1988–89.

Parkvilla play their home games at Claremont Stadium in Navan. Their youth teams play at the 'Ditch Pitch', on the Commons Road.

The club was officially formed in 1966. A former member of the Leinster Senior League, the club achieved their highest league finish in 1975–76 when they finished runners-up in the Senior Division. They were also runners-up in the Metropolitan Cup, losing 0–2 to Bray Wanderers. In 1988–89, Parkvilla finished sixth. The following seasons became a battle against relegation, until 1992–93 when the club finished bottom of the league table. Although Parkvilla returned to the top Leinster division in 1994–95, the season ended in relegation. By 2008, the club was competing in the third division of the league, Division 1A, and they remained there for the 2010–11 and 2011–12 seasons. In 2018, Parkvilla announced they were leaving the Leinster Senior League to join the North East Football League (NEFL), the successor to the Meath District League.

Parkvilla qualified for the 1985–86 FAI Cup, making it to the fourth round before losing 0–1 to TEK United. In 1988–89, they made it as far as the round of 16, coming up against Home Farm at Claremont Stadium, but succumbed to a 0–2 scoreline. After qualifying for the FAI Cup in 1999–00, the club beat Whitehall Rangers 1–2 away from home. They made it to the second round before they were knocked out by Ramelton side Swilly Rovers. Parkvilla qualified for the FAI Cup once more in 2013.

Professional footballer Sam Curtis, a native of Navan, started out playing at Parkvilla.
