= Bluebell United F.C. =

Bluebell United A.F.C
- Full name: Bluebell United Football Club
- Nickname: The Bell
- Founded: 1946
- Ground: Capco Park; Naas Road; Clondalkin
- Coordinates: 53°19′16″N 6°21′53″W
- League: Leinster Senior League Senior 1 Division
Home colours	Away colours

Bluebell United Football Club is an Irish association football club originally based in Bluebell, Dublin. The club's senior team plays in the Leinster Senior League Senior Division. The club has also fielded teams to compete in the FAI Cup, the FAI Intermediate Cup and the Leinster Senior Cup. Founded in 1946 in the Camac Park district of Bluebell, the club later relocated to its current home near Clondalkin.

In 2014–15, Bluebell were Leinster Senior League champions, 27 years after winning their previous title. Bluebell United would go on to retain the title again in the following 2015–16 season. The club are also known as the 'Bell.

== History ==
Bluebell United Football Club was founded in 1946 at 9 Camac Park, Bluebell. 17-year-old Bert Curtis scored Bluebell United's first ever goal, coming against Bohemians in a minor league game. The club initially entered the Sunday Alliance League before joining the Athletic Union League. Bluebell moved to the Leinster Senior League for the 1970–71 season. In their first year at intermediate level, the club were runners-up in the FAI Intermediate Cup. The club did the intermediate double in 1981–82 when they won the FAI Intermediate Cup and the Leinster Senior League Senior Division.

Its pitch is located on the Naas Road at Capco Park, directly opposite The Red Cow, Moran Hotel.

During the 1999 season, a revamp of the football ground's playing surface was carried out. This project was part funded by a grant from the Irish National Lottery, the remainder was raised by organised events, plus funding from team sponsors and advertisers. All the club's committee members work on a voluntary basis.

In 2020, the club's then manager and a former player were arrested and put on trial for drug trafficking.

== Notable players ==
=== Republic of Ireland internationals ===
- (Republic of Ireland) Fran Brennan
- (Republic of Ireland) Keith Fahey
- (Republic of Ireland) Shay Keogh

=== Republic of Ireland U21 international ===
- (Republic of Ireland) Paul Byrne
- (Republic of Ireland) Trevor Molloy
- (Republic of Ireland) Richie Towell

=== Republic of Ireland U19 international ===
- (Republic of Ireland) Mick Cooke

=== League of Ireland XI representative ===
- (Republic of Ireland) Eddie Byrne

=== Republic of Ireland manager ===
- (Republic of Ireland) Brian Kerr

== Honours ==
Competitions won by the club include:

- Leinster Senior League
  - Champions: 1981–82, 1983–84, 1985–86, 1986–87, 2014–15, 2015–16, 2017-18: 7
  - Runners-up: 1976–77, 1984–85, 1987–88, 1988–89, 2009–10, 2010–11, 2011–12: 7 ?
- FAI Intermediate Cup
  - Champions: 1981–82, 1989–90, 1992–93, 1993–94, 1999–2000: 5
  - Runners-up: 1970–71, 1982–83, 1991–92, 2003–04, 2008–09, 2012–13: 6
