= Leixlip United F.C. =

Leixlip United
- Full name: Leixlip United Football Club
- Founded: 1969
- Ground: Leixlip Amenities Centre, Leixlip, Kildare
- League: Leinster Senior League Intermediate Division Senior 1
| Home colours | Away colours |

Leixlip United Football Club are a football club from Leixlip, Kildare, who play their home games at Leixlip Amenities Centre on Station Road. They play in the Leinster Senior League.

The club qualified for the 2014 FAI Cup.

== History ==
=== Before 1969 ===
Leixlip United had existed for the seasons of 1959–60, 1960–61 and 1961–62 before problems arising from a shortage of local players caused the club to fold.

=== Ormeau A.F.C. - The Leixlip connection ===
Originally based in Dublin city and founded by George Bendal, an English ex-Manchester City goalkeeper, they played in Division 1 in the Leinster Senior League. When the club had problems finding a ground they relocated to Leixlip in 1965 in Easton Park, quite a few of the locals joined a few and thus the seeds for what would become Leixlip United had sown. Upon George Bendal's death, Ormeau A.F.C. also folded. In 1969, when Leixlip United reformed they benefited from players who had played in the Leinster Senior League for Ormeau including Theo Watkins, a junior international goalkeeper.

=== Early years ===
After the formation of Leixlip United in 1969, one of the club's main focuses was to acquire a permanent ground. The club first played their games in Green Lane where two primary schools now stand loaned to the club from the local parish priests.

After the land had been occupied by the two schools the schoolboy section played at Greenlane and the Juniors secured a pitch in Dodsboro with assistance from Lucan United.

The club found a home on the lands of Desmond Guinness in Leixlip village the schoolboy section and Juniors played their matches upon this ground.

The schoolboys team moved to Leixlip Amenities Centre in November 1992, and the senior team also moved there for 1984–85.

=== Athletic Union League ===
Leixlip United first competed in the Athletic Union League and Leinster Junior League Counties Division. Competing first in Division 3A, within four years the first team had reached the top division within the A.U.L. The club's first team stayed at this level for five years and, during this time, the second team joined the A.U.L and reached the top division in 1981/82.

After relegation from the top division, the club remained in the second division from 1978/79 until 1986/87 whereupon they were relegated into the third division where they remained until leaving the A.U.L in 1987/88.

One of the more noteworthy campaigns for the club in the A.U.L was the 1970/71 season. In this season, Leixlip lost just once and claimed 52 points from 30 games winning promotion from Division 2, beating out St.Josephs Boys and Tolka Rovers to the title.

=== Leinster Senior League ===
After two years in the A.U.L third division, the team left the A.U.L and enter the Leinster Senior League in 1988/89. Initially entering into Division 1A and Division 2B, during the following half a decade the club were relegated into Division 1b.

While the club remained between the 1A and 1B divisions of the Leinster Senior League for a period, on the final day of the 2011/2012 season, the club won promotion to Senior 1. Having been relegation candidates early on in the season, the club beat St. James Gate in the Iveagh Grounds and on the final day of the season. This began the start of what would three back-to-back promotions. In 2012/2013, Leixlip won the Senior 1 title ahead of UCD and Verona FC. In doing so, they reached the highest tier of the Leinster Senior League: Senior Sunday. This would be the first time the club would ever compete at this level.

In 2014/2015, Leixlip where immediately relegated from the Senior division. In the Senior 1 Sunday campaign in 2015/2016, the club reached a "respectable" 7th place.

The 2016/2017 season saw Leixlip win promotion to the Senior division again for the second time ever in the club's history. This season saw Leixlip finish third in the league behind Newbridge and Portmarnock respectively.

In the 2017/2018 season, Leixlip were relegated from the Senior Division.

In February 2025, a planning application was submitted to Kildare County Council for developments to the clubhouse, expected to cost €796,000.

== Notable former players ==
Republic of Ireland senior internationals

- Andrew Omobamidele

Republic of Ireland women's internationals

- Emma Byrne

Republic of Ireland U20 internationals

- Andrew Omobamidele

Republic of Ireland U20 internationals

- Deji Sotona

Republic of Ireland U19 internationals

- Andrew Omobamidele
- Eoghan Stokes

Republic of Ireland U18 internationals

- Gabriel Adebambo
- Josh Giurgi
- Harry Halwax
- Andrew Omobamidele

Republic of Ireland U17 internationals

- Josh Giurgi
- Harry Halwax
- Luke Kehir
- Andrew Omobamidele
- Eoghan Stokes

Republic of Ireland U16 internationals

- Harry Halwax
- Luke Kehir
- Deji Sotona
- Eoghan Stokes

Republic of Ireland U15 internationals

- Harry Halwax
- Deji Sotona
