= Dunboyne A.F.C. =

Irish football club

- Full name: Dunboyne Association Football Club
- Founded: 1970
- Ground: Summerhill Road
- Chairman: Gus Lynch
- League: Leinster Senior League
- Website: www.dunboyneafc.ie
colours

Dunboyne A.F.C. is an Irish association football club based in Dunboyne, County Meath. The club, which was founded in 1970, competes in the Leinster Senior League and plays its home matches at the Summerhill Road football ground. In 2015, Dunboyne qualified for the FAI Cup for the first time.

== History ==
Dunboyne were founded in 1970 by a group of teenagers led by Pat Brady, Mick Kane, Mick McAuley and Kevin Poleon. They applied to join the Athletic Union League in Dublin, although they were informed a prerequisite to entry was for clubs to have their own pitch. To meet this requirement, the club obtained the use of a field on Summerhill Road from local man Joseph Bruton, father of John and Richard Bruton. The local sergeant, Nicholas Caesar, was recruited as the club's first manager and donations were collected to meet the league's financial requirements.

The club were admitted into Division 3A of the Athletic Union League (AUL), the league's lowest division at the time, and played their first match on 30 August 1970 against Newbrook Celtic from Rathfarnham. Dunboyne played in a yellow and blue kit while Sam Conroy became the club's first captain. The kit colours had been adopted from the yellow jerseys and blue shorts of the Brazilian national team, who had recently won the World Cup in Mexico. Dunboyne lost their next match, and first home game, 1–4 against Orchard United with Sam Conroy scoring Dunboyne A.F.C.'s first ever goal on 6 September 1970.

The club's next four games were against Rathdown Celtic (away), Dominicans (home), Southern Cross (away) and Ashtown United (home) while the club's first win came nine games later; a 2–1 victory at home to Dublin side Lazio, who were formed by the city's Italian community. Three years later, Dunboyne A.F.C. won the 1973–74 Division 3 (Sunday) league.

In 1993, Dunboyne purchased the 12.5 acres (5.1 hectares) of land at Summerhill Road that the club had been playing on since 1970.

In 2009, the club won the Aviva "Club of the Year" award, which led to representatives from the club meeting the famed Brazilian footballer, Pelé. In 2010, the club was awarded the UEFA Grassroots Bronze Medal for best grassroots club.

The club qualified for the 2015 FAI Cup, losing to Killester United.

== Notable former players ==
Republic of Ireland internationals

- (Republic of Ireland) Darragh Lenihan

Republic of Ireland under-18 internationals

- (Republic of Ireland) Sean McHale
