= T.E.K. United =

T.E.K. United FC
- Full name: T.E.K. United Football Club
- Founded: 1946
- Ground: Rockford Park
- Manager: Andy McNulty
- League: Leinster Senior League
- Website: tekutd.ie

T.E.K. United FC is an Irish soccer (association football) club based in Blackrock, Dublin. Their senior men's team play in the Leinster Senior League and women's team play in the Dublin Women's Soccer League . They also regularly compete in the FAI Cup, the FAI Intermediate Cup, the FAI Junior Cup and the Leinster Senior Cup.

The club reached the final of the FAI Intermediate Cup on five occasions; 1963–64, 1964–65, 1971–72, 1973–74, and 1988–89. They won the competition twice, in 1965 against Glasheen and in 1989 against St James's Gate.

== History ==
T.E.K. United were founded in 1946. By the 1950s, the club had joined the Wicklow & District League along with other south Dublin teams such as Wayside Celtic. On 12 May 1963 T.E.K. became FAI Junior Cup champions, beating Blackrock of County Cork 3–1 at Dalymount Park. The following season, T.E.K. reached the final of the FAI Intermediate Cup for the first time, but lost to fellow Dublin club Transport F.C. The club returned to the final of the competition in 1965 and this time T.E.K. beat Glasheen to win their first intermediate trophy. Over the next two and a half decades, they reached the final of the FAI Intermediate Cup on three more occasions (1971–72, 1973–74, and 1988–89), winning it again in 1989 against St James's Gate.

As an intermediate club, T.E.K. routinely featured in the Leinster Senior League Senior Division, the third tier of the Republic of Ireland football league system. Throughout the 1960s and 1970s, the club won the division on six occasions. Between 1964 and 1967, the club were managed by former Everton forward and Republic of Ireland international, Peter Farrell. In the 1986–87 season, T.E.K. finished level on points with Bluebell United at the top of the league table.

In the 2014–15 season, the club won the Leinster Senior League (LSL) 1A Division. On 4 August 2020 the club announced that former Bohemians goalkeeper, Andy McNulty, had been appointed as their new first team manager. In March 2021, after the implementation of playing restrictions due to the Coronavirus pandemic, McNulty expressed concern for a club with only one senior team and no underage youth setup. TEK started the 2022–23 season in the fourth and final intermediate division of the LSL, the 1B Division, where they finished in ninth position. The following season, the club finished eleventh in the league. On 1 July 2026, TEK announced a partnership with Cabinteely F.C. to field a men's team in the Leinster Senior League, as well as an under-19 team, named TEK Cabinteely F.C. They joined the Leinster Senior League at Major 1 Sunday level.

== Origin of name ==
T.E.K's name, as detailed by their crest, is an allusion to the 1882 Battle of Tell El Kebir in which the British Army — under Anglo-Irish General Garnet Wolseley, 1st Viscount Wolseley — defeated Khedivate of Egypt forces led by Ahmed ʻUrabi. While the club doesn't directly take its name from the battle, its name is linked to that of a nearby local dairy company, Sutton's T.E.K. Dairy, whose founder had fought at the battle. More direct references to the battle can be seen in T.E.K's badge, which features an image of the Sphinx as well as the year 1882 and the words 'EGYPT' and 'TEL-EL-KEBIR'.

== Notable former players ==
- (Republic of Ireland) Pat Devlin
- (United States) Nicky Broujos

== Notable former managers ==
- (Republic of Ireland) Peter Farrell

== Honours ==
- Leinster Senior League
  - Senior Division
    - Winners (6): 1964–1965, 1965–1966, 1968–1969, 1970–1971, 1974–1975, 1977–1978
    - Runners-up (3): 1971–72, 1972–73, 1986–87
  - 1A Division
    - 2014–15
- FAI Intermediate Cup
  - Winners (2): 1964–65, 1988–89
  - Runners-up (3): 1963–64, 1971–72, 1973–74
- FAI Junior Cup
  - 1962–63
