= Dinny Lowry =

Irish footballer (1934–2025)

Personal information
- Full name: Denis Lowry
- Date of birth: 30 November 1934
- Place of birth: Dublin, Ireland
- Date of death: 8 October 2025 (aged 90)
- Place of death: Trim, Ireland
- Position: Goalkeeper

Youth career
- 1949–1952: Bulfin United

Senior career*
Years	Team	Apps	(Gls)
1952–1969	St Patrick's Athletic	251	(0)
1969–1971	Bohemians	32	(0)
1971–1973	Sligo Rovers	24	(0)

International career
1950s	League of Ireland XI		
1962	Republic of Ireland	1	(0)
- * Club domestic league appearances and goals

Denis "Dinny" Lowry (30 November 1934 – 8 October 2025) was an Irish soccer player who played as a goalkeeper. He spent seventeen years at St Patrick's Athletic, winning two League of Ireland titles (back to back), two FAI Cups, the League of Ireland Shield, two Dublin City Cups, three LFA President's Cups and an FAI Intermediate Cup.

Lowry spent two seasons at Bohemians, where he won another FAI Cup in 1970, and a further two seasons with Sligo Rovers before retiring from football in 1973.

He represented his league in the League of Ireland XI on a regular basis and went on to win one cap for the Republic of Ireland senior team against Austria in 1962.

== Club career ==
=== Early career ===
Born in Dublin in 1934, Lowry lined out with St Patrick's Athletic's nursery club Bulfin United as a young teenager alongside future Saints' team-mates Fergie Crawford and Christy Fitzgerald. He won both schoolboy and youth international honours for Ireland before joining the senior ranks at St Patrick's Athletic.

==== St Patrick's Athletic ====
Having joined from Bulfin United, Lowry made his St Patrick's Athletic debut in 1952 after initially playing mainly with the club's B team where he won the FAI Intermediate Cup in 1952–53. Lowry went on to become one of the most decorated players in St Pat's history, with two League of Ireland titles (1954–55 & 1955–56, two FAI Cup wins (1959 and 1961) and a League of Ireland Shield title (1959–60) to his name, along with six more winners medals in the Dublin City Cup, LFA President's Cup and FAI Intermediate Cup. Having impressed while playing for the League of Ireland XI side in the 1950s, offers were made to sign Lowry from Everton and Sheffield United but Lowry remained at his beloved St Pat's, happy to earn the extra fiver or tenner a week to supplement his income from his other job at the Dublin Corporation. Lowry appeared in both of the club's opening forays in European competition, the 1961–62 UEFA Cup Winners' Cup tie versus Dunfermline, and the 1967–68 Inter-Cities Fairs Cup clash with French side Girondins de Bordeaux. His longevity at the club is summed up by the fact that he is the only player in Pat's history to receive two testimonial matches - in August 1962 and again in 1967. In the second of these, a Pat's XI took on a joint Bohemians and Dundalk selection at Richmond Park, with goalkeeper Lowry sealed the win for the Saints with two goals from the penalty spot. In 2010, Lowry was inducted into the Harry Boland Hall of Fame by the club.

==== Later career ====
Lowry joined Bohemians in 1969, making two European appearances for the club. After Bohemians turned professional he became the second player to sign a professional contract on 11 March 1969. In 1970, he won the FAI Cup with Bohs, his third time winning the trophy in his career. He then transferred to Sligo Rovers, where he spent two seasons before retiring in 1973. After retiring from playing, Lowry remained involved in football as a goalkeeping coach with Shamrock Rovers for a few years.

== International career ==
Aged just 20, Lowry was called up to the Republic of Ireland national team for the first time, for a match against Spain but remained an unused substitute. His appearances for the League of Ireland XI representative side won the popular netminder even more fans. There were many famous wins and draws but, ironically, a heavy defeat remains one of his finest hours. A match at Goodison Park against the English Football League on 7 December 1955 saw a 5–1 win for the home side, but all the plaudits were for Lowry. The English side included Billy Wright of Wolverhampton Wanderers, Nat Lofthouse of Bolton Wanderers, Tom Finney of Preston North End, Roger Byrne of Manchester United and John Atyeo of Bristol City. The Irish Press reported that Atyeo and other English League players stood in front of Lowry's goal and clapped Lowry for his many saves. "Lowry's legion of fans are headed by his mother, seven sisters and two brothers, and now include the English forwards to whom he denied scores on December 7th."

In 1962, Lowry was recalled to the Republic of Ireland senior squad and this time he was to earn his full international debut. Alan Kelly Sr. was injured after 34 minutes with Lowry replacing him for the remaining hour or so in the 2-3 defeat on 8 April 1962. In doing so he became only the third St Patrick's Athletic player in history to be capped by Ireland while at the club, after his former team-mates Shay Gibbons and Tommy Dunne.

== Personal life and death ==
After retiring from football, Lowry was a frequent visitor to St Patrick's Athletic events. He was regarded as one of the great gentlemen of the game, sharing his wisdom and stories with fans and club officials with great humility and decency. After spending much of his life in Perrystown, County Dublin, and 45 years working in "The Corpo", he moved to Kilmessan, County Meath with his beloved wife Dolores.

Lowry died on 8 October 2025, at the age of 90.

== Honours ==
St Patrick's Athletic

- League of Ireland: 1954–55, 1955–56
- FAI Cup: 1959, 1961
- League of Ireland Shield: 1959–60
- Dublin City Cup: 1953–54, 1955–56
- LFA President's Cup: 1952–53, 1953–54, 1955–56
- FAI Intermediate Cup: 1952–53

Bohemians

- FAI Cup: 1970

Individual

- PFAI Merit Award: 1995
- St Patrick's Athletic Harry Boland Hall of Fame: Inducted in 2010
