= Paddy O'Rourke (association footballer) =

Irish footballer

Patrick O'Rourke
Personal information
- Date of birth: 1 January 1934 (age 92)
- Place of birth: Dublin, Ireland
- Date of death: 31 March 2011
- Place of death: Dublin, Ireland
- Position: Forward

Youth career
- –1953: Bulfin United

Senior career*
Years	Team	Apps	(Gls)
1953–1963	St Patrick's Athletic	?	(74)
1963-1966	Limerick United	?	(17)

International career
1958	Republic of Ireland B	2	(0)
- * Club domestic league appearances and goals

Patrick O'Rourke (1 January 1934 – 17 January 2011) was an Irish professional footballer who played as a forward in the League of Ireland, most notably for St Patrick's Athletic.

O'Rourke was brought up in the Inchicore neighbourhood of west Dublin and played youth football for local side Bulfin United. In 1953 he signed for League of Ireland outfit St Patrick's Athletic, also located in the Inchicore area. With the Saints, O'Rourke would win two league championships and two FAI Cups. The 1955-56 League season would see O'Rourke and strike partner Shay Gibbons net a combined haul of 38 goals for the Saints.

In 1958, he won two caps for the Ireland B team, one at home against South Africa B and the other away to Iceland. On 12 September 1961, O'Rourke was Pats only goalscorer in a 4-1 loss away to Dunfermline Athletic in the UEFA Cup Winners' Cup.

In January 2011 St Patrick's Athletic announced the death of O'Rourke.
