= Noel Campbell =

Noel Campbell may refer to:

- Noel Campbell (footballer) (1949–2022), Irish footballer and football manager
- Noel Campbell (hurler) (1920–1985), Irish hurler
- Noel W. Campbell (born 1941), member of the Arizona House of Representatives
