= Mick Kearin =

Irish footballer (1943–2025)

Personal information
- Full name: Michael Kearin
- Date of birth: 9 May 1943
- Place of birth: Kildare, Ireland
- Date of death: 27 July 2025 (aged 82)
- Place of death: Kildare, Ireland
- Height: 5 ft 6 in (1.68 m)
- Position: Wing-half

Youth career
- 1960–1963: St Patrick's Athletic

Senior career*
Years	Team	Apps	(Gls)
1963–1966	Bohemians	64	(17)
1966–1973	Shamrock Rovers	127	(6)
1967	→ Boston Rovers (loan)	2	(0)
1973–1974	Bohemians	11	(0)
1974	Athlone Town	9	(1)
Total		213	(24)

International career
1967–1971	League of Ireland XI	4	(0)
1971	Republic of Ireland	1	(0)
- * Club domestic league appearances and goals

Michael Kearin (9 May 1943 – 27 July 2025), also known as Mick Kearin, was an Irish footballer who mainly played as a wing-half, after starting his career as a forward. Kearin was the first player from County Kildare to be capped by the international team.

Kearin remained the only Kildare man with an international cap until Mark Travers was capped in September 2019.

== Early life ==
Mick Kearin was born on 9 May 1943 in Kildare. He grew up in Kildare Town, at the time a rural area where Gaelic football was the predominant sport. Barred from playing association football in the local park, Kearin and his friends would loan a ball from the army team and play on the barracks field. While soccer remained his primary sport, Kearin also played Gaelic football and hurling, winning an Under-14 trophy with his school's Gaelic football team. On 25 September 1957, he took a half day off school to attend Shamrock Rovers' European debut, a 1957–58 European Cup match against Manchester United. The game, featuring the Busby Babes team, took place five months before the Munich Air Disaster.

At the age of fifteen, Kearin moved to Dublin for work where he began playing in the under-18 Athletic Union League (AUL) Minor division with a team from Collins Avenue. Kearin played for two years at outside left before returning to Kildare. At the time there was no association football team in Kildare so Shay Gibbons, who knew Kearin's uncle, arranged a trial for the then 17-year-old with Gibbons' former club, St Patrick's Athletic.

== Career ==
After a successful trial, Kearin signed with St Patrick's Athletic and began playing for their youth and reserve teams. Despite initially lacking knowledge in the basics of the game, such as the offside rule, Kearin eventually became the designated substitute for the senior team. As a substitute, he would play only if a senior member was injured. Kearin's first team debut came in January 1961, an away defeat to Cork Celtic, and he came close to starting the 1960–61 FAI Cup final. Kearin scored his only competitive goal for St Pats in the 1961–62 season, during a League of Ireland Shield match against Waterford that ended in a 3–1 victory. He was released by Pats in 1963 and joined Tullamore Town.

=== Bohemians ===
Before being released, Kearin had scored a hat-trick for St Pats in a reserve team game against Bohemian F.C. which brought him to the attention of their manager George Lax. Lax reached a verbal agreement with Kearin to join Bohemians but failed to follow up on his initial offer. This led to Kearin joining amateur team Tullamore Town initially but he ultimately transferred to Bohemians in 1963 after contacting Lax during the season.

Bohemians were fully amateur at the time and had been in the doldrums since the late 1930s. The previous season had seen the club struggle in the league, winning one game while finishing bottom of the 1962–63 table. In Kearin's first season at the club, Bohs were unable to better their previous results, ending another season in last place. Lax left at the end of the 1963–64 season and was replaced by Phibsborough local, Seán Thomas. "It was major news – Sean Thomas had managed Shamrock Rovers and brought them phenomenal success."

Kearin was moved to midfield under Thomas and paired with Jimmy Conway. Playing a 4-2-4 formation, Bohemians underwent a revival and the club finished third in both the 1964–65 and 1965–66 seasons. However, the club remained strictly amateur and, despite attracting crowds of up to 30,000 and having "an absolutely fantastic set-up" according to Kearin, they refused to offer players professional contracts and "didn't even give you travel expenses".

Kearin’s performances began to attract suitors that were willing to pay him to play. A move to England failed to materialise but he received an offer to turn professional from Shamrock Rovers. This was followed by offers to turn professional and semi-professional from Irish League runners-up Derry City, Irish Cup winners Glentoran and League of Ireland champions Waterford. Keen to secure Kearin's signature amid the increased interest, Shamrock Rovers quadrupled their original offer. While Kearin was considering his options, his manager at Bohs advised him to go to Rovers.

I must say Seán Thomas was very helpful... I remember him saying: ‘If these other offers from England don’t work out, Rovers is the team for you. The reason is every week you’ll have your wages from Rovers, every week you’ll have your £2 bonus for winning and £1 for a draw.’ Some of them will offer you more money, but how long will it last? They could be bankrupt two or three months into the season.

— Mick Kearin, The42

When Cork came in with a higher offer, Kearin heeded the advice from Thomas and rejected them in favour of Shamrock Rovers.

=== Shamrock Rovers ===
Kearin signed for Shamrock Rovers in May 1966. As FAI Cup holders, the club had qualified for the European Cup Winners' Cup competition and began their 1966–67 European campaign with an 8–2 victory over Spora Luxembourg. Kearin played in Shamrock Rovers' next European Cup Winners' Cup tie against FC Bayern Munich, which he cited as his personal career highlight:

I have won three (FAI) cup medals in a row but my favourite result was the one against Bayern Munich. We should have won the first leg at Dalymount too.

— Mick Kearin, Leinster Leader

The Bayern side contained future World Cup winners Franz Beckenbauer, Sepp Maier and Gerd Müller but Rovers held the away team to a 1–1 draw in the first leg at Dalymount Park on 9 November 1966. Rovers initially conceded two goals in the return leg – played on a night where temperatures were nine degrees below freezing – before staging a comeback to level the scores at 2–2, with Kearin involved in the second. With five minutes left and Rovers heading into the next round on away goals, Gerd Müller scored the winner to send Bayern through instead. Kearin felt that the free-kick Bayern scored from should have been retaken, as the ball was rolling when Beckenbauer kicked it, but the goal stood and Bayern went on to win the tournament. Kearin's first season with Rovers did conclude with a trophy, after the club managed to retain the FAI Cup with a 3–2 victory over St. Patrick's Athletic.

=== Boston Rovers ===
After his first season with Shamrock Rovers, Kearin was involved in the ill-fated Boston Rovers team, alongside several other Shamrock Rovers players, including Mick Leech, Paddy Mulligan and Frank O’Neill. The side, who were managed by Liam Tuohy, were essentially an imported and renamed Shamrock Rovers team that competed in the United Soccer Association league in 1967 before dissolving just a year later.

A six-week summer team to promote the advent of professional soccer in the US, the Boston Rovers games saw Mick play against the Detroit Cougars (the franchise name given to Glentoran F.C.). Boston Rovers also came up against South American teams, and the likes of Sunderland, Wolves, Hibs and Stoke City amongst others.

Kearin played a couple of matches following this loan move, but after agreeing a longer deal with the Massachusetts-based team, Rovers intervened and prevented him from signing.

=== Return to Rovers ===
His seven-year stay at Glenmalure Park included scoring twice in eight appearances for Rovers in Europe.

He scored in the 1969 FAI Cup final replay against Cork Celtic.

Kearin became the first man from County Kildare to be capped by the Republic of Ireland national team on 10 October 1971, in a European Championship qualifier against Austria. The game in the Linzer Stadion finished 6–0 to Austria. He also won three amateur caps for his country — against Scotland home and away, and Iceland away — and represented the League of Ireland XI four times while at Milltown.

Heart problems put Kearin in hospital for three months and kept him from playing for over a year. Shortly after returning, Kearin was informed that he was to be transferred to Bohemians in a swap deal for David Parkes.

He rejoined Bohemians in January 1973 as the Dublin club finished the campaign in third place, five points behind 1972–73 league champions Waterford. Seán Thomas resigned as manager that summer and was replaced by Kearin's former teammate Billy Young. Kearin then suffered a broken toe just before the start of the 1973–74 season. While building up his fitness in the reserves, Kearin had a disagreement with Young which resulted in Kearin leaving the club. Kearin later finished his career with Athlone Town.

== Death and legacy ==
After his playing days finished, Kearin remained involved with football in his local area and was involved in the establishment of Kildare Town Football Club in 1966.

Kearin died on 27 July 2025, at the age of 82.

== Honours ==
Shamrock Rovers

- FAI Cup: 1967, 1968, 1969
- League of Ireland Shield: 1967–68
- Leinster Senior Cup: 1968–69
- Dublin City Cup: 1966–67
- Blaxnit Cup: 1967–68

== Sources ==
- Paul Doolan; Robert Goggins (1993). The Hoops. Gill & MacMillan. ISBN 0-7171-2121-6.
- Seán Ryan; Stephen Burke (1987). The Book of Irish Goalscorers. Irish Soccer Co-Op.
