= Jimmy Collins (footballer, born 1923) =

Irish footballer

Personal information
- Date of birth: 1923
- Place of birth: Dublin, Ireland
- Position: Goalkeeper

Senior career*
Years	Team	Apps	(Gls)
1944–1945	Bohemians		
1945–1948	Shamrock Rovers	18	(0)
1948–1952	Botanic		
1952–1957	St Patrick's Athletic	50	(0)

International career
1946–1954	League of Ireland XI	8	(0)
- * Club domestic league appearances and goals

Jimmy Collins (born 1923) was an Irish footballer who played as a goalkeeper during the 1940s and 1950s.

Collins played for Bohemians and Shamrock Rovers during his career in the League of Ireland and was goalkeeper in the 1945 Bohemian Inter City Cup winning team against Belfast Celtic at Dalymount Park.

He earned three League of Ireland XI caps while at Milltown in the 1940s. Played for St Patrick's Athletic in the 1950s.

His uncle Frank Collins played for Celtic and his brother Paddy also played for Pats. His brother-in-law was St Patrick's Athletic stalwart Harry Boland.

== Honours ==
Shamrock Rovers

- FAI Cup: 1948
- Inter City Cup: 1946, 1947
- Dublin City Cup: 1947–48

Bohemians

- Inter City Cup: 1945

== Sources ==
- Paul Doolan; Robert Goggins. The Hoops. ISBN 0-7171-2121-6.
