= Eddie Gormley =

Irish football coach and former player (born 1968)

Personal information
- Full name: Edward Joseph Gormley
- Date of birth: 23 October 1968 (age 58)
- Place of birth: Dublin, Ireland
- Position: Midfielder

Youth career
- St Joseph's Boys

Senior career*
Years	Team	Apps	(Gls)
1987–1988	Bray Wanderers	11	(3)
1988–1990	Tottenham Hotspur	0	(0)
1988–1989	→ Chesterfield (loan)	4	(0)
1988–1989	→ Motherwell (loan)	0	(0)
1989–1990	→ Shrewsbury Town (loan)	0	(0)
1990–1993	Doncaster Rovers	118	(16)
1993–1994	→ Drogheda United (loan)	13	(0)
1994–2000	St Patrick's Athletic	173	(32)
2000–2003	Bray Wanderers	71	(13)
2002–2003	→ Ballymena United (loan)	4	(0)
2003–2005	Bray Wanderers	51	(4)
Total		445	(68)

International career
1989	Republic of Ireland U21	3	(0)
1996–2000	League of Ireland XI	?	

Managerial career
- 2006–2010: Bray Wanderers
- 2015–2016: Cabinteely
- * Club domestic league appearances and goals

Eddie Gormley (born 23 October 1968) is an Irish football coach and former player who most recently managed Cabinteely.

== Early career ==
Educated at Cabinteely Community School where he played for the School Junior & Senior teams, and also playing schoolboy football with St Joseph's Boys, Gormley joined League of Ireland side Bray Wanderers in the summer of 1987. He made his League of Ireland debut for Bray at Derry City F.C. on the opening day of the 1987–88 League of Ireland Premier Division season on 13 September 1987. He scored his first league goal at Dalymount Park on 9 October. After only a handful of appearances Gormley impressed in a trial at Tottenham Hotspur and was signed on a three-year contract in November 1987. During his time at Tottenham, Gormley would earn Republic of Ireland U-21 caps. He would however not play for Tottenham's first team, outside of friendlies and testimonials. Tottenham loaned out Gormley to Chesterfield, Motherwell and Shrewsbury Town F.C. to get some first team experience.

== Doncaster Rovers ==
At the end of the 1989/90 season Gormley was released by Tottenham and signed by Billy Bremner for Doncaster Rovers. Gormley inspired Doncaster to ten point lead in the league before financial circumstances saw a number of crucial players sold off, resulting in Doncaster missing out on promotion. The following two years saw Doncaster struggle as a side without any real chance of promotion. Gormley, however, flourished and was voted the club's Player of the Year in both 1991/92 and 1992/93 seasons. After three seasons at Doncaster, Gormley decided to return to Ireland and initially joined Drogheda United on loan at the start of the 1993/94 season.

== St Patrick's Athletic ==
After securing his release from Doncaster Rovers, Gormley was signed by St Patrick's Athletic manager Brian Kerr in December 1993. His debut game went relatively unnoticed as it happened to be St. Pats first home game on return to their natural home of Richmond Park after a four-and-a-half-year absence. He played on the left wing during his first season. The following season saw Gormley move into central midfield and his performances there saw him selected on the League's All Star team. In 1995/96 Gormley won the PFAI Player of the Year award as he drove St Pats to the league title. He also won the Player of the Month for December 1995.

Unfortunately for Gormley and St Pats he missed a penalty in the FAI Cup final replay as Shelbourne stopped the Saints winning the double. After finishing 5th in 1996/97, Gormley captained the Saints to further league titles in 1997/98 and 1998/99. His goal at Buckley Park to clinch the league in May 1998 as well as his lob of the Sligo keeper from the halfway line at Richmond are what he will be remembered for.

Gormley captained the League of Ireland XI from 1996 to 2000 and left St Patrick’s Athletic in 2000.

He played in two 1996–97 UEFA Cup games and captained Pats in four UEFA Champions League qualifying games including a 0-0 draw at Celtic Park

== End of playing career and on ==
Having decided to leave St Pats, Gormley re-joined his first club, Bray Wanderers. He played for four seasons and performed admirably. In January 2003 he signed on loan for Kenny Shiels at Ballymena United and made his Irish League debut at Carrick on 8 February.

He was unable, however to help Bray reach the heights he reached with St Pats and in 2005, Gormley retired from professional football. His last game was as a substitute on 24 June at the Belfield Bowl. After his retirement Eddie played one season for Pearse Rovers (Sallynoggin, Co Dublin) in the Leinster Senior League. After a spell as coach with, in September 2006 Gormley was appointed manager of Bray Wanderers.

On 9 August 2010, Gormley parted company with Bray Wanderers, according to the club website.

He scored a total of 21 goals in 151 appearances at the Carlisle Grounds.

== Honours ==
=== Club ===
St Patrick's Athletic

- League of Ireland Premier Division (3): 1995-96, 1997-98, 1998-99
- FAI Super Cup (1): 1999

=== Individual ===
- PFAI Players' Player of the Year (1): 1995-96
- Doncaster Rovers Player of the Year (2): 1991-92, 1992–93
