= Damien Byrne =

Irish footballer (1954–2026)

Personal information
- Date of birth: 6 April 1954
- Place of birth: County Dublin, Ireland
- Date of death: 5 February 2026 (aged 71)
- Positions: Forward; centre-back

Youth career
- Home Farm

Senior career*
Years	Team	Apps	(Gls)
1973–1974	Home Farm	22	(4)
1974	Dundalk	4	(2)
1974–1983	Drogheda United	214	(47)
1983–1985	Crusaders	52	(6)
1985–1987	Ards	47	(0)
1987	Shamrock Rovers	3	(0)
1987–1993	St Patrick's Athletic	109	(2)
Total		451	(61)

International career
1982	League of Ireland XI	?	(0)
1987	Irish League XI	1	(0)
- * Club domestic league appearances and goals

Damien Byrne (6 April 1954 – 5 February 2026) was an Irish professional footballer. In a career spanning 20 seasons, Byrne won player of the year awards in both Northern Ireland and the Republic of Ireland, the only man to do so. He started his career as a forward but midway through his career switched to centre-back.

His son Phil Byrne played for Carrick Rangers in the IFA Premiership.

== Career ==
Byrne played schoolboy football for Home Farm and made his League of Ireland debut on 12 October 1973 for that club against St Patrick's Athletic. He stayed only one season with Home Farm and in the summer of 1974 he signed for Dundalk, however by the end of November he had moved on to their County Louth rivals Drogheda United. During his time at Drogheda Byrne would win League of Ireland representative honours. The closest he came to winning a trophy was playing on the FAI Cup final losing Drogheda side of 1976. When he left Drogheda in 1983 he was their all-time leading goal scorer with 47.

Byrne signed for Belfast club Crusaders in 1983. He spent two years at Seaview and won their Player of the Year award in his second season. He then joined Ards F.C. of Newtownards. Such were his performances in his second season with the North Down club, and following a notable 3rd-place finish in the league, Byrne was voted the Irish League Player of the Year in 1986–87.

Byrne joined Shamrock Rovers in the summer of 1987 but despite making one appearance in the European Cup in October of that year was persuaded by Brian Kerr to join his new look St Patrick's Athletic side. Kerr had signed several young players and felt he needed an experienced defender to lead the team. St Pats needed to beat Dundalk in the last game of the season to win the league but drew and had to be content with runners up medals. In 1990 Byrne went one better as he became the first St Patrick's Athletic captain in 34 years to lift the League of Ireland trophy. He was voted the Personality of the Year by the Soccer Writer of Ireland to complete his north–south double. Byrne missed the majority of the following season as a knee injury threatened his career. He came back in 1991–92 but mainly played back up as St Pats young defenders took over. He retired from playing in 1993 to take an assistant manager role at Bohemians. He stayed with Bohs less than a season and began managing local junior side Lusk United.

== Death ==
Byrne died on 5 February 2026, at the age of 71.

== Honours ==
St Patrick's Athletic

- League of Ireland Premier Division: 1989–90
- Leinster Senior Cup: 1990

Individual'

- SWAI Personality of the Year: 1989–90
- Northern Ireland Football Writers' Association Player of the Year: 1986–87
