= Robbie Gaffney =

Irish footballer

Personal information
- Date of birth: 17 December 1957 (age 68)
- Place of birth: Dublin, Ireland
- Position: Winger

Youth career
- –1976: Rosemount Boys

Senior career*
Years	Team	Apps	(Gls)
1976–1983	Shamrock Rovers	149	(12)
1983–1986	University College Dublin	55	(6)
1986–1988	Shelbourne	47	(7)
1988–1991	St Patrick's Athletic	?	(?)
1991–1992	Kilkenny City	5	(0)

International career
1979	Republic of Ireland U21	1	(0)
1979	League of Ireland XI	1	(0)
- * Club domestic league appearances and goals

Robbie Gaffney (born 17 December 1957) is an Irish former footballer.

== Career ==
He signed for Shamrock Rovers under Seán Thomas at the tail end of the 1975/76 season. He made his debut on the 5th of September in a FAI League Cup tie against Home Farm and his first goal came in the next game at Oriel Park. He made his League of Ireland debut for Shamrock Rovers at Flower Lodge against Albert Rovers on 5 October 1976. He won the League of Ireland Cup and made 4 appearances in European competition while at Glenmalure Park. He was an unused substitute in the 1978 FAI Cup Final.

In April 1979 Gaffney played for the League of Ireland XI against Italian League B .

On 12 September 1979, he played for Republic of Ireland U21 against Poland.

That season he was the first recipient of the Shamrock Rovers Player of the Year award Shamrock Rovers F.C.#Player of the Year

In May 1980 Gaffney guested for Waterford United on a tour of the US

He signed for University College Dublin in August 1983 He won the FAI Cup in a shock win over his previous club in May 1984 and played in the UEFA Cup Winners Cup against Everton. After a spell at Shelbourne he joined Pats in August 1988 He played in both legs of Pats' 1988-89 UEFA Cup ties against Hearts. Under Brian Kerr he won the League Championship in 1990 as well as playing in the following season's European Cup.

At the 2006 Shamrock Rovers Player of the Year award Robbie was inducted into the Rovers Hall of Fame

A lifelong fan and club member of Shamrock Rovers F.C., he has maintained his ties with the club attending games on a weekly basis.

== Sources ==
- Paul Doolan; Robert Goggins. The Hoops. ISBN 0-7171-2121-6.
