= Shay Keogh =

Irish footballer and manager (1934–2020)

Personal information
- Full name: Seamus Keogh
- Date of birth: 6 September 1934
- Place of birth: Dublin, Ireland
- Date of death: 13 April 2020 (aged 85)
- Place of death: Rathfarnham, Ireland
- Position: Centre half

Senior career*
Years	Team	Apps	(Gls)
1952–1961	Shamrock Rovers	142	(2)
1961–1962	Dundalk	17	(0)
1962–1963	Jacobs		
1963–1965	St Patrick's Athletic	29	(0)

International career
1955–1959	League of Ireland XI	9	(0)
1957–1958	Republic of Ireland B	2	(0)
1958	Republic of Ireland	1	(0)

Managerial career
- 1963–1965: St Patrick's Athletic
- * Club domestic league appearances and goals

Seamus "Shay" Keogh (6 September 1934 – 13 April 2020) was an Irish footballer who played as a centre half. He was part of the great Shamrock Rovers teams of the 1950s in a side, popularly known as Coad's Colts, that enjoyed many memorable days during that decade. A former schoolboy and youth international, he joined Shamrock Rovers in 1952 and stayed for nearly a decade at Glenmalure Park. As a Crumlin man, Shay played in the club's first four European games against Manchester United and OGC Nice in the European Champion Club's Cup.

== Career ==
He captained his country in the first ever B international in October 1957. He won his second "B" cap the following year winning in Iceland.

He won one cap for the Republic of Ireland in a 2–2 friendly against Poland at Dalymount Park on 5 October 1958.

Shay represented the League of Ireland XI nine times between 1955 and 1959.

He shared a benefit game with Ronnie Nolan in May 1961.

In September 1961 he signed for Dundalk and also had further spells at Jacobs F.C. and as player-manager at St Patrick's Athletic between 1963 and 1965.

On 20 December 1973, Liam Tuohy resigned as Rovers manager. Shay, who was at that time the technical advisor to the club, was appointed manager, with Dougie Wood but resigned two days later.

== Personal life ==
Keogh died in the Rathfarnham suburb of Dublin on 13 April 2020 at the age of 86.

== Honours ==
League of Ireland: 3

- Shamrock Rovers – 1953/54, 1956/57, 1958/59

FAI Cup: 2

- Shamrock Rovers – 1955, 1956

League of Ireland Shield: 3

- Shamrock Rovers – 1955/56, 1956/57, 1957/58
- Leinster Senior Cup: 5
- Shamrock Rovers – 1953, 1955, 1956, 1957, 1958
- Dublin City Cup: 5
- Shamrock Rovers – 1952/53, 1954/55, 1956/57, 1957/58, 1959/60
- Top Four Cup: 2
- Shamrock Rovers – 1956, 1958
