= George Lax =

English footballer (1905–1975)

Personal information
- Full name: George Samuel Lax
- Date of birth: 2 January 1905
- Place of birth: Barnsley, England
- Date of death: 1975 (aged 69–70)
- Position: Wing half

Senior career*
Years	Team	Apps	(Gls)
1928–1929	Frickley Colliery		
1929–1932	Wolverhampton Wanderers	61	(1)
1932–1933	Barnsley	48	(1)
1933–1934	Bournemouth & Boscombe Athletic	7	(1)
1934–1935	Worcester City		
1935–1936	Evesham Town		
Total		116	(3)

Managerial career
- 1938–1942: Bohemians
- 1957–1959: Cork Hibernians
- 1960–1964: Bohemians
- 1965–1966: St Patrick's Athletic
- * Club domestic league appearances and goals

George Samuel Lax (2 January 1905 – 1975) was an English footballer who played in the Football League for Barnsley, Bournemouth & Boscombe Athletic and Wolverhampton Wanderers. After his playing career ended Lax spent time managing Irish side Bohemians.
