= 1954–55 League of Ireland =

League of Ireland
- Season: 1954–55
- Champions: St Patrick's Athletic (2nd title)
- Matches played: 132
- Goals scored: 550 (4.17 per match)
- Top goalscorer: Jimmy Gauld (30 goals)
- Biggest home win: Shamrock Rovers 7–0 Bohemians; St Patrick's Athletic 10–3 Dundalk
- Biggest away win: Transport 0–7 Shelbourne
- Highest scoring: St Patrick's Athletic 10–3 Dundalk

The 1954–55 League of Ireland was the 34th season of senior football in the Republic of Ireland.

Shamrock Rovers were the defending champions.

== Changes from 1953–54 season ==
No new teams were elected to the League.

== Teams ==
Locations of the 1954–55 League of Ireland teams

Team	Location	Stadium
Bohemians	Dublin (Phibsborough)	Dalymount Park
Cork Athletic	Cork (Mardyke)	Mardyke
Drumcondra	Dublin (Drumcondra)	Tolka Park
Dundalk	Dundalk	Oriel Park
Evergreen United	Cork (Turners Cross)	Turners Cross
Limerick	Limerick	Markets Field
Shamrock Rovers	Dublin (Milltown)	Glenmalure Park
Shelbourne	Dublin (Ringsend)	Shelbourne Park
Sligo Rovers	Sligo	The Showgrounds
St Patrick's Athletic	Dublin (Inchicore)	Richmond Park
Transport	Bray	Carlisle Grounds
Waterford	Waterford	Kilcohan Park

== Season overview ==
St Patrick's Athletic won their second title.

== Table ==
Pos	Team	Pld	W	D	L	GF	GA	GD	Pts
1	St Patrick's Athletic	22	17	2	3	62	31	+31	36
2	Waterford	22	16	1	5	70	43	+27	33
3	Shamrock Rovers	22	12	4	6	63	37	+26	28
4	Shelbourne	22	13	2	7	62	41	+21	28
5	Cork Athletic	22	10	5	7	53	51	+2	25
6	Drumcondra	22	9	5	8	38	30	+8	23
7	Bohemians	22	9	1	12	41	55	−14	19
8	Limerick	22	8	1	13	32	50	−18	17
9	Sligo Rovers	22	6	3	13	34	49	−15	15
10	Transport	22	5	4	13	22	51	−29	14
11	Evergreen United	22	4	5	13	34	46	−12	13
12	Dundalk	22	5	3	14	39	66	−27	13

Source: RSSSF, foot.dk

== Results ==
Home \ Away	BOH	CAT	DRU	DUN	EVE	LIM	SHM	SHE	SLI	StP	TRA	WAT
Bohemians	—	3–1	0–2	2–1	3–1	6–1	5–1	1–4	2–1	1–2	2–1	1–4
Cork Athletic	4–4	—	2–0	2–6	4–1	4–1	3–3	4–2	4–1	1–1	3–1	4–3
Drumcondra	6–2	1–2	—	1–0	2–1	0–0	1–2	2–3	0–0	0–3	1–1	0–5
Dundalk	0–2	2–2	0–6	—	3–3	3–1	1–2	1–3	4–0	0–3	3–4	1–2
Evergreen United	2–0	1–1	1–2	4–0	—	2–3	2–3	1–4	4–1	0–1	0–0	2–5
Limerick	3–1	0–1	0–5	1–2	2–1	—	1–2	2–1	1–2	0–2	5–2	4–2
Shamrock Rovers	7–0	7–1	1–3	7–3	1–4	3–0	—	2–0	3–3	2–2	6–0	2–3
Shelbourne	3–0	3–2	2–2	2–1	5–0	3–1	1–1	—	1–3	1–4	0–1	1–6
Sligo Rovers	3–1	2–1	1–2	3–4	2–2	0–1	1–0	2–4	—	1–2	3–0	1–2
St Patrick's Athletic	2–1	5–2	1–0	10–3	1–0	3–2	0–5	4–6	5–2	—	3–0	4–1
Transport	1–2	2–1	1–0	0–0	1–1	0–1	1–2	0–7	2–1	1–4	—	1–3
Waterford	5–2	2–4	2–2	6–1	2–1	5–2	2–1	1–6	4–1	2–0	3–2	—

Source: extratime.com
Legend: Blue = home team win; Yellow = draw; Red = away team win.

== Top scorers ==
Rank	Player	Club	Goals
1	(Scotland) Jimmy Gauld	Waterford	30
2	(Republic of Ireland) Shay Gibbons	St Patrick's Athletic	28
3	(Republic of Ireland) Rory Dwyer	Shelbourne	19
4	(Republic of Ireland) Dermot Curtis	Shelbourne	16
5	(Republic of Ireland) Paddy Ambrose	Shamrock Rovers	14
5	(Republic of Ireland) Johnny Armstrong	Sligo Rovers	14
7	(Republic of Ireland) Jack Fitzgerald	Waterford	13
8	(Republic of Ireland) Joe Martin	St Patrick's Athletic	12
8	(Republic of Ireland) Willie Moloney	Cork Athletic	12
10	(Republic of Ireland) Tommy Collins	Cork Athletic	11
10	(Republic of Ireland) Dessie Glynn	Drumcondra	11
