= Noel Campbell (hurler) =

Irish hurler

Personal information
- Native name: Nollaig Mac Cathmhaoil (Irish)
- Born: Belfast, County Antrim

Sport
- Sport: Hurling
- Position: Centre-back
Club
- Years: Club
- Mitchel's
Club titles
- Antrim titles: 1
Inter-county
- Years: County
- 1942-1954: Antrim
Inter-county titles
- Ulster titles: 7
- All-Irelands: 0

Noel Campbell (1920–1985) was a famous Irish sportsperson. He played hurling with his local club Mitchel's and with the Antrim senior inter-county team in the 1942 and 1954. With the team, he played in the All-Ireland Senior Hurling Championship during 1943.
