= Noel Campbell (footballer) =

Irish footballer (1949–2022)

Personal information
- Date of birth: 11 December 1949
- Place of birth: Dublin, Ireland
- Date of death: 13 June 2022 (aged 72)
- Position: Midfielder

Senior career*
Years	Team	Apps	(Gls)
1966–1971	St Patrick's Athletic	87	(26)
1971–1979	Fortuna Köln	194	(27)
1980–1983	Shamrock Rovers	15	(0)
Total		296	(53)

International career
1971–1977	Republic of Ireland	11	(0)

Managerial career
- 1983: Shamrock Rovers
- * Club domestic league appearances and goals

Noel Campbell (11 December 1949 – 13 June 2022) was an Irish professional footballer who played as a midfielder.

== Career ==
Born in Dublin, Campbell began his career in 1966 with St Patrick's Athletic in the League of Ireland where, alongside his brother Johnny, he played in the Inter-Cities Fairs Cup against Girondins de Bordeaux; with Noel scoring twice in the Stade Chaban-Delmas. He had played in the 1967 FAI Cup Final losing to Shamrock Rovers. He was the club's top scorer in 1968–69 and 1969–70.

While with St Patrick's he made his full international debut on 30 May 1971.

The following season Campbell moved to SC Fortuna Köln in Germany. From 1971 to 1973 he made 51 appearances and scored nine goals in the Regionalliga West; he also played five games and scored two goals in the promotion play-off to the Bundesliga. In 1973–74 he played 29 Bundesliga games and when he played against Borussia Mönchengladbach on 11 August 1973, he became the first Irishman to play in the Bundesliga. From 1974 to 1979 he scored 16 goals in 110 2. Bundesliga games.

Campbell won 11 caps for Ireland, one in his St Patrick's Athletic days and a further ten whilst under contract to Fortuna Köln (becoming, in 1972, the first Irishman to appear in the national colours whilst on the books of a club based in mainland Europe). He departed the international stage in somewhat ignominious circumstances, dismissed (rather arbitrarily, in the view of contemporary observers) within a minute of his introduction as a substitute in a 1977 World Cup qualifier against Bulgaria in Sofia.

Campbell made his debut for Shamrock Rovers on 3 December 1980 in a Leinster Senior Cup tie. He took over as assistant manager the following season to John Giles and then from February 1983 until May 1983 he was team manager.

He was the uncle of Dave Campbell.

Campbell died on 13 June 2022, aged 72.
