= 1955–56 League of Ireland =

League of Ireland
- Season: 1955–56
- Champions: St Patrick's Athletic (3rd title)
- Matches played: 132
- Goals scored: 520 (3.94 per match)
- Top goalscorer: Shay Gibbons (21 goals)
- Biggest home win: Shelbourne 7–1 Limerick; Waterford 7–1 Limerick; Shamrock Rovers 6–0 Transport
- Biggest away win: Transport 1–6 Waterford
- Highest scoring: Waterford 8–3 Transport

The 1955–56 League of Ireland was the 35th season of senior football in the Republic of Ireland.

St Patrick's Athletic were the defending champions.

== Changes from 1954–55 season ==
No new teams were elected to the League.

== Teams ==
Locations of the 1954–55 League of Ireland teams

Team	Location	Stadium
Bohemians	Dublin (Phibsborough)	Dalymount Park
Cork Athletic	Cork (Mardyke)	Mardyke
Drumcondra	Dublin (Drumcondra)	Tolka Park
Dundalk	Dundalk	Oriel Park
Evergreen United	Cork (Turners Cross)	Turners Cross
Limerick	Limerick	Markets Field
Shamrock Rovers	Dublin (Milltown)	Glenmalure Park
Shelbourne	Dublin (Ringsend)	Shelbourne Park
Sligo Rovers	Sligo	The Showgrounds
St Patrick's Athletic	Dublin (Inchicore)	Richmond Park
Transport	Bray	Carlisle Grounds
Waterford	Waterford	Kilcohan Park

== Season overview ==
St Patrick's Athletic won their third title.

== Table ==
Pos	Team	Pld	W	D	L	GF	GA	GD	Pts
1	St Patrick's Athletic	22	16	2	4	61	34	+27	34
2	Shamrock Rovers	22	15	1	6	54	30	+24	31
3	Waterford	22	14	2	6	66	39	+27	30
4	Evergreen United	22	10	4	8	34	28	+6	24
5	Sligo Rovers	22	11	2	9	47	50	−3	24
6	Shelbourne	22	8	4	10	45	42	+3	20
7	Bohemians	22	7	5	10	29	36	−7	19
8	Drumcondra	22	8	2	12	41	51	−10	18
9	Cork Athletic	22	7	3	12	38	43	−5	17
10	Dundalk	22	6	5	11	37	54	−17	17
11	Limerick	22	6	5	11	35	54	−19	17
12	Transport	22	5	3	14	33	59	−26	13

Source: RSSSF, foot.dk

== Results ==
Home \ Away	BOH	CAT	DRU	DUN	EVE	LIM	SHM	SHE	SLI	STP	TRA	WAT
Bohemians	—	2–1	3–0	2–2	0–2	1–1	3–2	1–2	4–0	2–0	1–1	3–1
Cork Athletic	1–0	—	4–3	5–0	1–0	4–1	0–2	3–3	1–2	1–2	3–1	1–0
Drumcondra	1–1	2–0	—	2–5	2–3	2–0	3–4	2–2	3–1	2–0	4–2	1–4
Dundalk	0–1	2–0	3–2	—	0–1	3–3	1–2	3–2	1–1	3–3	2–1	3–2
Evergreen United	2–0	1–1	1–2	2–2	—	3–1	1–2	2–1	1–0	1–3	1–2	4–2
Limerick	0–0	2–2	3–1	2–0	0–2	—	2–1	2–2	4–1	3–4	3–2	1–3
Shamrock Rovers	4–0	3–1	1–2	2–1	1–1	3–2	—	2–1	4–0	2–1	6–0	1–2
Shelbourne	3–1	2–0	2–0	3–0	3–1	7–1	1–2	—	1–3	1–3	3–1	1–4
Sligo Rovers	6–2	4–3	4–0	4–2	0–3	3–2	0–4	4–2	—	1–3	4–0	5–3
St Patrick's Athletic	3–1	3–2	4–2	4–0	2–1	3–0	2–4	3–2	4–0	—	3–2	2–0
Transport	2–1	3–1	1–3	5–3	0–0	0–1	3–1	1–1	1–2	1–6	—	1–2
Waterford	2–0	5–3	3–1	5–1	3–1	7–1	3–1	2–0	2–2	3–3	8–3	—

Source: Extratime.com
Legend: Blue = home team win; Yellow = draw; Red = away team win.

== Top scorers ==
Rank	Player	Club	Goals
1	Shay Gibbons	St Patrick's Athletic	21
2	Paddy Ambrose	Shamrock Rovers	20
3	Paddy O'Rourke	St Patrick's Athletic	17
4	Gerry Malone	Shelbourne	15
5	Johnny Armstrong	Sligo Rovers	14
6	Jack Walsh	Sligo Rovers	12
7	Jack Fitzgerald	Waterford	11
7	Mick Lipper	Limerick	11
7	Sonny Price	Waterford	11
10	Francie Callan	Dundalk	10
10	Eddie Doran	Evergreen United	10
