= St Patrick's Athletic F.C. =

Football club in Dublin

St Patrick's Athletic
- Full name: St Patrick's Athletic Football Club
- Nicknames: Saints; The Athletic; Red Army; Super Saints
- Short name: Pat's; St Pat's; Patrick's
- Founded: 1929; 97 years ago
- Ground: Richmond Park
- Capacity: 5,500 (2,800 seated)
- Chairman: Garrett Kelleher
- Manager: Stephen Kenny
- League: League of Ireland Premier Division
- 2026: 3rd of 10
- Website: www.stpatsfc.com
Home colours	Away colours	Third colours

St Patrick's Athletic Football Club, commonly known as Pat's or The Saints, is a professional Irish association football club based in Inchicore, Dublin, that plays in the League of Ireland Premier Division. Founded in May 1929, they played originally in Phoenix Park but they moved to their current ground of Richmond Park in 1939.

St Patrick's Athletic have won many trophies in Irish Club Football, including nine League Titles, the fifth most in Irish Football, as well as five FAI Cups and four League Cups.

The club graduated through the ranks of the Leinster Senior League and duly took their place in the League of Ireland in 1951, and won the Championship at their first attempt. The club's glory years came in the 1950s and 1990s when they won 6 of their 8 league titles. Along with Bohemians, they are one of only two teams to never have been relegated from the Premier Division. The club play in red and white colours and their nicknames include the Saints, Supersaints and Pats. The Saints also have a lot of Dublin Derby games with the likes of Shelbourne, Shamrock Rovers, and Bohemians.

== History ==
=== Origins of the club ===
Football in Inchicore dates back to at least 1898. There had been previous local clubs called St Patrick's and St Patrick's Athletic, as well as clubs associated with the Inchicore railway works, the Great Southern Railways (also known as the GSR). The more recent of these, GSR FC, started around 1927. They played in the Athletic Union League at first, with their home ground at Bluebell, although most of their games from then on were played in the Inchicore Works or "Pond Field" with others at Richmond Park and Chapelizod.

GSR fielded two teams in 1929–30; an "A" team in the Leinster League Division Two, and a "B" team in the AUL Division One. GSR's B team seems to have been dropped for the following season, 1930–31.

The club spent 1929 finding its feet by playing friendly fixtures, with the first ever team photo taken in June 1929, before they began playing competitive games in September 1930, at the 15 acres in the nearby Phoenix Park.

=== Leinster Senior League years ===
During the late 1940s and 1950s, St Pats played in the Leinster Senior League. During this period they won the league title on six occasions. This included four successive titles between 1947 and 1948 and 1950–51. In 1947–48 St Pats completed a treble after also winning both the FAI Intermediate Cup and Leinster Senior Cup. The 1948–49 season would see St Pats win a Leinster Senior League / FAI Intermediate Cup double. In 1950–51 a young Shay Gibbons helped St Pats win the Leinster Senior League title for the fourth time. After St Pats first team joined the League of Ireland in 1951–52, their reserve team won two further Leinster Senior League titles in 1955–56 and 1956–57.

=== 1950–1960 ===
==== Entering the League of Ireland ====
Chart of yearly table positions for St Patrick's Athletic in League of Ireland

In 1951–52 the club was admitted, along with Cork side Evergreen United, to the League of Ireland. St Pats made an immediate impact, winning the league championship at their first attempt. Two more league championship successes followed in 1954–55 and 1955–56. The club had to wait until 1959 before their first FAI Cup success, repeating the feat in 1961. Despite several appearances in the final since 1961, it took the Saints until 2014 to win their third.

=== 1960–1980 ===
St Pats struggled throughout the late 1960s, 1970s and early 1980s. Among those players to emerge was Noel Campbell. Campbell spent a number of years with St Pats (gaining the first of his Irish caps) before moving to SC Fortuna Köln where he would play 8 seasons. Perhaps the brightest star to play for St Pats was Paul McGrath. McGrath was signed by Saints manager Charlie Walker from junior side Dalkey United. Within a year he had won the PFAI Player of the Year award and earned himself a move to Manchester United. FIFA World Cup-winning goalkeeper Gordon Banks also played one match for St Pats.

=== 1980–1990 ===
The appointment of Brian Kerr as manager in 1986 was a major turning point in the fortunes of the club. At the end of the 1988–89 season, St Pats left Richmond Park for what the board of directors called "a short time" while redevelopment work was done.

1989 saw a joint St Patrick's Athletic & Bohemians side play a friendly against the Libya national football team in Tripoli, drawing 1–1 in what was a highly controversial friendly during Muammar Gaddafi's reign as leader of Libya. The year 1990 saw the Saints draw 0–0 with the Tunisia national football team in Tunis and another 0–0 draw with the Iran national football team in Tehran, while in April of the following year they beat Finland 2–1 at Dalymount Park, leaving the club with an undefeated record against international sides and without conceding a goal.

=== 1990–1999 ===
Playing in Harold's Cross, Kerr's blend of young players (Paul Osam, Curtis Fleming, Pat Fenlon, John McDonnell) and experienced campaigners disregarded by other clubs (Damian Byrne, Dave Henderson) won the club's first league championship in 34 years on Easter Monday 1990. Most Irish football commentators expected the young Saints to dominate Irish football for some time. A series of takeover attempts saw the club thrust into turmoil and Kerr was forced to break up the team. In the summer of 1992, the club were hours away from extinction before a group of local investors raised £82,000 to save the club.

With the aid of a newly appointed Chief executive, and former player, Pat Dolan and by the club's new chairman, Tim O'Flaherty, the league trophy returned to Richmond Park in 1996.

A new generation of players came in with players such as Eddie Gormley, Paul Osam and Ricky O'Flaherty together with young players such as Colin Hawkins and Trevor Molloy. When Kerr resigned to take up the Director of Coaching job with the FAI, the work was continued by Pat Dolan and then Liam Buckley installed as manager. The good results continued as further league championships were secured in 1998 and 1999 which led to European qualification and a 0–0 draw with the Celtic at Celtic Park, the club lost the return leg in Tolka Park, Dublin. The club, however, suffered a setback in the same competition one year later when they lost 10–0 on aggregate to Zimbru Chișinău.

=== 2000–2004 ===
Into the new century, the success continued. St Pats won the Leinster Senior Cup in 2000/01. Controversy dogged the club in the 2001/02 season due to player registration irregularities. The club had 9 points deducted due to fielding an ineligible player (Paul Marney) in their first 3 games of the season, but this decision was revoked upon arbitration, on 22 March 2002. They then had 15 points deducted for playing Charles Mbabazi Livingstone in the first 5 matches of the season in spite of not having registered him until 12 September 2001. An FAI arbitration panel rejected the Saints' appeal against the point deduction and Shelbourne finished the season as league champions. St Pats disagreed with the decision so much that they claim they won the league in 2001–02, as they would have beaten Shelbourne to the title without the points deduction. St. Patrick's however finished third and would take their place in the following season's Intertoto Cup.

That season also saw St Patrick's come close to merging with fellow League of Ireland club St. Francis. This move was greeted with anger by club supporters and although St. Francis went out of business (and therefore the league) the merger never happened.

=== Johnny McDonnell Reign (2004–2009) ===
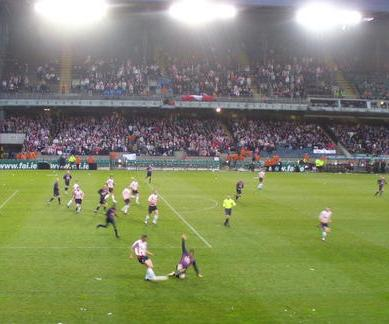
St Patrick's Athletic contesting the 2006 FAI Cup Final against Derry City at Lansdowne Road.

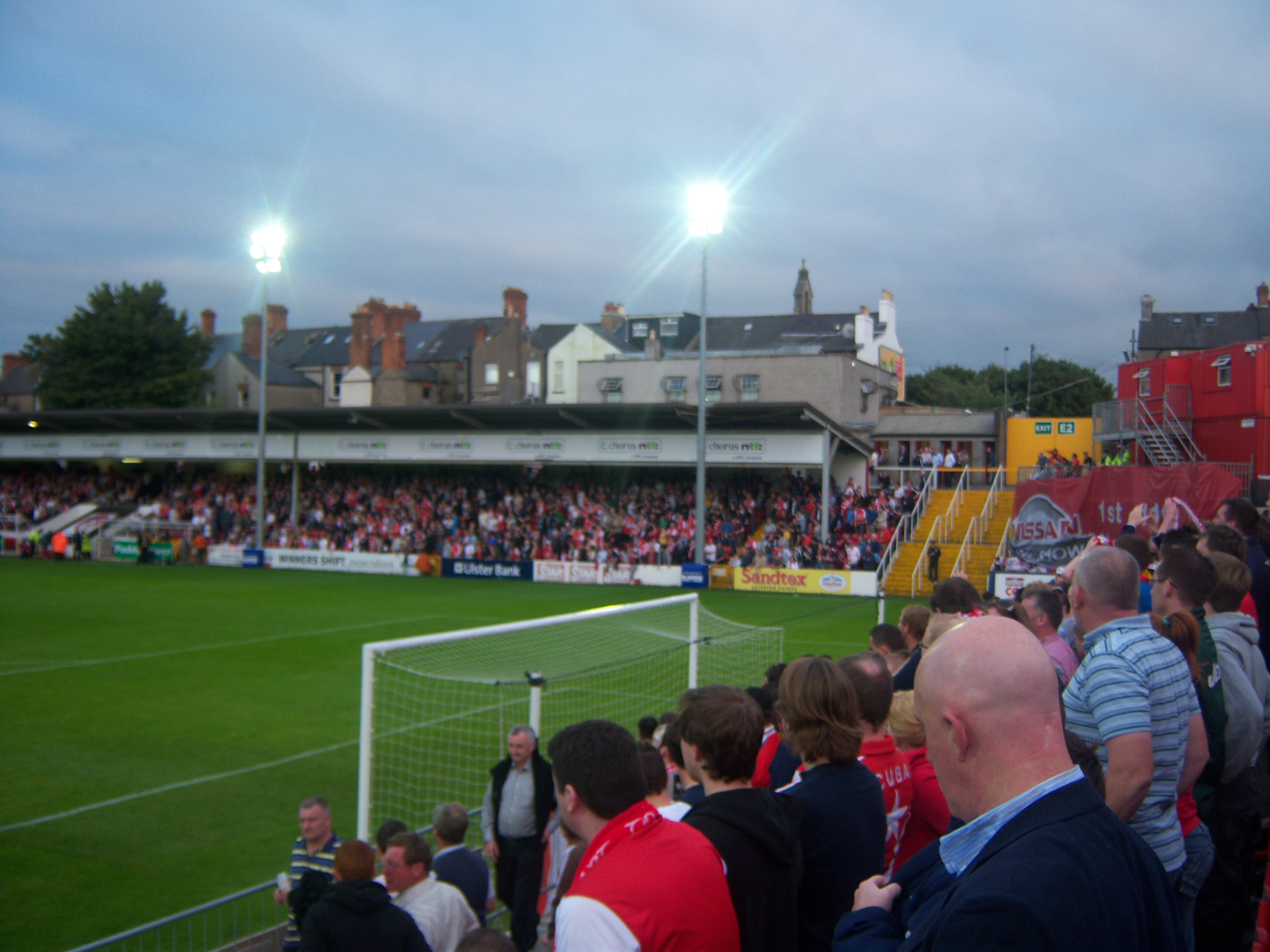
Richmond Park before the UEFA Cup clash against Elfsborg in 2008.

The club marked its 75th anniversary in 2004, also in 2004, a change of management happened with former favourite Johnny McDonnell taking over the helm at the club. In 2005 the club were forced to investigate the idea of sharing a new stadium in Tallaght with Shamrock Rovers in order to comply with the FAI's wish for Dublin clubs to ground share. The move was met with furious protests by the club's supporters and a group of concerned fans formed a committee under the banner of 'Pats 4 Richmond' . The committee was set up at a public meeting called in the Red Cow Hotel by lifelong supporters and former Director Dermot O'Hara. At this first meeting a committee was elected and a letter was draughted and delivered by hand the following day to the Clubs Board of Directors by newly elected Chairman of Pats 4 Richmond Dermot O'Hara. The letter contained demands for the Club to cease all negotiations regarding any move to Tallaght and to declare its intention to stay in Inchicore and commit itself to the development of Richmond Park as the Clubs permanent home and to cease all further negotiations regarding their planned move to Tallaght. Momentum quickly gathered for the Pats 4 Richmond campaign as the media and many other clubs in the league came in behind the fans demands to save their spiritual home in Inchicore. Subsequent public meetings were help in St Michaels Community Centre on a monthly basis and the pressure was mounting on the Club. At these highly charged meetings fans were briefed on the progress of the campaign. A petition was launched and over 5,0000 signatures were collected demanding the club cease any further plans to sell Richmond Park or to join a groundshare with Shamrock Rovers in Tallaght. Finally in July the Club relented and signalled their commitment to stay in Richmond Park. A lot of this was down to the fact that a new owner Garrett Kelleher had just bought the Club and would make a commitment to develop a proper stadium in Inchicore. Garrett Kelleher began this project by purchasing the Richmond House pub (also known as McDowell's) for use as an official clubhouse. To date the club is still in negotiations with the local council to construct a new stadium in Inchicore. The club lost yet another FAI Cup Final in December 2006 and their hunt for their third victory in the elusive competition continues. In early 2007 the club was purchased by a wealthy property magnate Garrett Kelleher. After a number of months of negotiations, Kelleher finally announced himself as Chairman of St Patrick's Athletic on 19 July 2007. One of his first acts on taking over St Pats was to appoint ex-manager Brian Kerr as director of football.

It was the same again for the 2008 season with Pats battling up the top with Bohemians for the title. Also, this year Pats were in Europe because their second-place finish in 2007 allowed them to qualify for the 2008–09 UEFA Cup. During their European run St Pats progressed through two rounds of the UEFA Cup beating JFK Olimps Riga and Elfsborg but the run came to an end when they lost to Hertha BSC in the First Round proper. Pats also lost out to Bohemians for the league title.

=== Jeff Kenna season: European run and domestic struggle (2009) ===
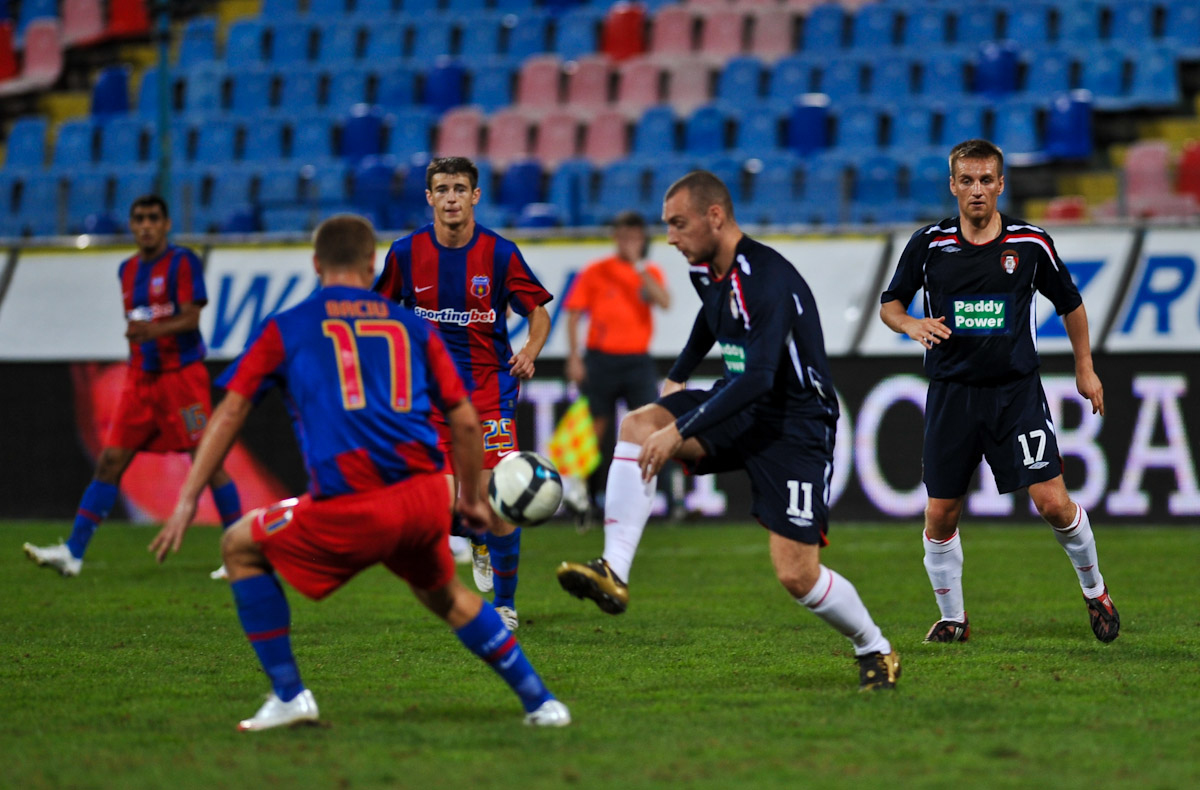
FC Steaua Bucharest V St Patrick's Athletic F.C. in 2009.

For the 2009 season Pats replaced Johnny McDonnell with Jeff Kenna in January 2009. He didn't have the best of starts with a 3–0 home defeat to his former club Galway United. He was immediately put under pressure when a bad run of results put them into a relegation battle. Despite the poor league form, once again Pats had another European run in the Europa League again progressing through two rounds of the Europa League, thus becoming only the second League of Ireland club (after Cork City in 2004 and 2005) to achieve such progress in two consecutive European campaigns. Pats this time won games against Valletta FC and Russian Premier League side Krylia Sovetov to reach the play-off round where they were defeated by FC Steaua București. In September 2009 with Pats struggling, Kenna resigned and was replaced for two games by Maurice O'Driscoll. Pete Mahon then took over until the end of the season and avoided relegation, winning two must-win games in the final two weeks of the season, away to Drogheda United and at home to Dublin rivals Shamrock Rovers.

=== Pete Mahon years (2009–2011) ===
Pete Mahon was appointed as manager for the 2010 season with John Gill as his assistant. The Super Saints reached their first Setanta Sports Cup final, where they met local rivals Bohemians after overcoming Sligo Rovers 6–2 over two legs. They lost the final at the Tallaght Stadium 1–0, however. The Saints were knocked out of the FAI Cup by archrivals Shamrock Rovers in a semi-final replay at Richmond Park, after knocking Dundalk, Belgrove and Sporting Fingal out. They were near the top of the table for the majority of the season; however, fell off somewhat near the end and finished in mid-table. The demise of Sporting Fingal saw the Saints take their European place for the 2011 season. Mahon led a successful Europa League campaign, knocking out Íþróttabandalag Vestmannaeyja from Iceland and FC Shakhter Karagandy from Kazakhstan before eventually being knocked out in the third qualifying round by Ukrainian side FC Karpaty Lviv. The Saints won the 2011 Leinster Senior Cup after beating Dublin rivals Bohemians 2–0 at Dalymount Park. The Saints' bid to end their 50-year drought of winning the FAI Cup came to an end, after knocking Crumlin United, Waterford United and Cork City out, the Saints faced old rivals Shelbourne in the semi-final. The Saints drew 1–1 at Tolka Park, failing to make use of their one-man advantage for the whole second half. The game went to a replay at Richmond Park and Shels went on to win, 3–1. Similar to the 2010 season, the Saints were near the top of the table for the most part of the season in 2011, but their title challenge petered out towards the end of the season and the Saints finished fourth meaning they would participate in UEFA Europa League qualifiers in the 2012 season.

=== Return of Liam Buckley: Return of success (2012–2018) ===
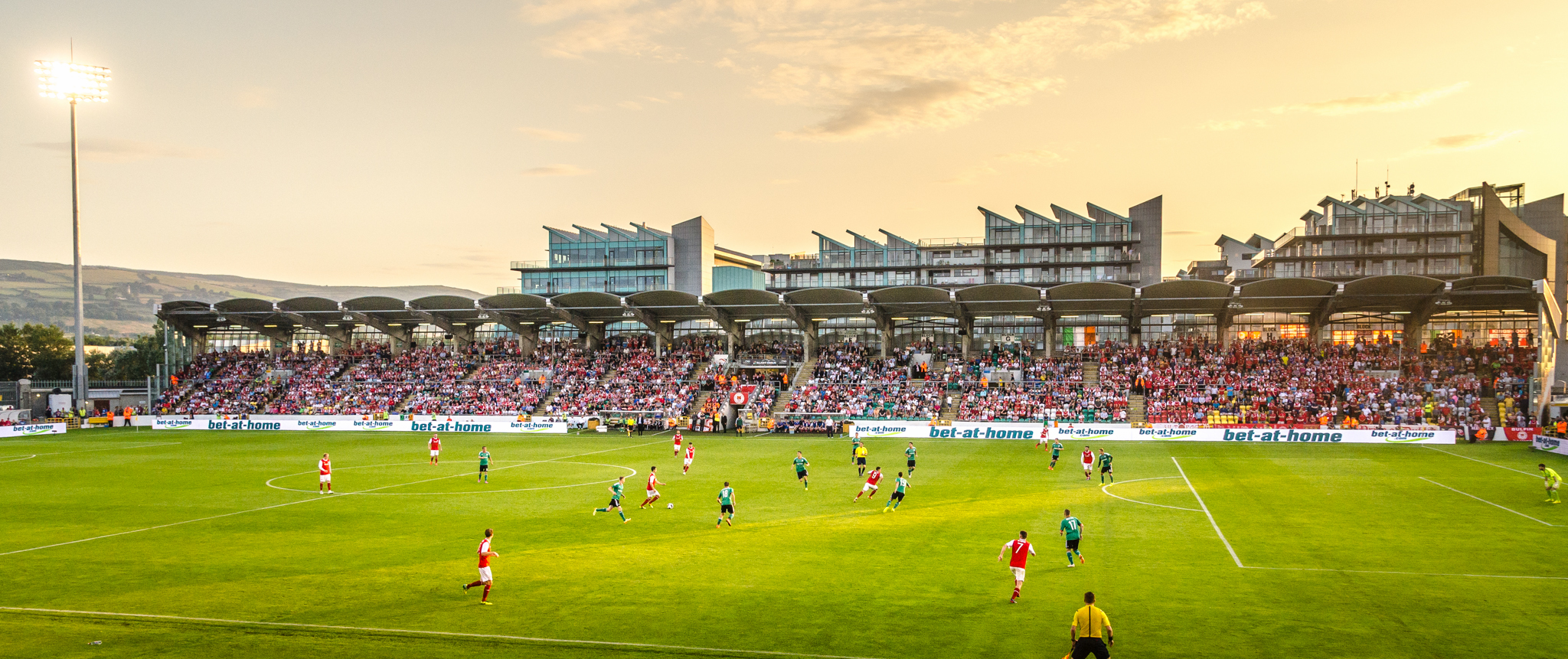
St Patrick's Athletic fans at Tallaght Stadium for the UEFA Champions League qualifier against Legia Warsaw in 2014.

The Saints decided not to renew manager Pete Mahon's contract for the 2012 season, appointing former player and manager Liam Buckley to the job, giving him a two-year contract with former player and assistant manager at the club, Trevor Croly as his assistant. Buckley refurbished the squad by bringing in fourteen and getting rid of sixteen.

Pats started the season off well with the team being unbeaten in its first six games, which included the game against Shamrock Rovers in a 5–1 win over their fierce rivals. Buckley took the reins of the club knowing of the European expectations at the club, managing his side to a third qualifying-round place after knocking both Íþróttabandalag Vestmannaeyja and NK Široki Brijeg out after extra time, to earn a tie with German powerhouse Hannover 96, who knocked the Saints out in the third qualifying round. Buckley's side finished 3rd in the league, 6 points off champions Sligo Rovers. He also guided his side to the 2012 FAI Cup Final, the club's first game at the Aviva Stadium, but lost 3–2 in extra time to Derry City and extending the Saints' FAI Cup-winning drought to 52 years.

The Saints then endured a tumultuous pre-season, losing Sean O'Connor, James Chambers, and Barry Murphy, as well as Buckley's number two, Trevor Croly, to rivals Shamrock Rovers. Crucially, though, Pats held on to a number of other players who had been strongly linked with Rovers, including Chris Forrester and Ian Bermingham, and added some quality to the first XI in the form of Killian Brennan (who would go on to win both the PFAI Players' Player of the Year and FAI National League Player of the Year awards), and Conan Byrne .

St Patrick's Athletic clinched their ninth League of Ireland title on 13 October 2013 after a 2–0 win against holders Sligo Rovers with two games to spare. They lifted the league trophy a week later at home to Derry City on 18 October and two days later played the 2013 Leinster Senior Cup Final against Shamrock Rovers, losing, 1–0, at Richmond Park.

The 2014 season started off with silverware for the Saints as they beat Sligo Rovers 1–0 in the inaugural President of Ireland's Cup, with Keith Fahey scoring a brilliant volley into the top corner from 25 yards clinching the trophy. The club crashed out of the UEFA Champions League at the first hurdle in the second round, bowing out to Legia Warsaw. In the first leg, they were denied a famous away win as Legia equalised in injury time to claim a 1–1 draw. An injury-plagued Pats side lost the second leg 5–0 at Tallaght Stadium, conceding 3 in the last 10 minutes. On 9 September 2014, a team of second-string players and young Saints beat Longford Town 2–1 away from home to win the 2014 Leinster Senior Cup with Sam Verdon and Jack Bayly scoring. The season ended for Pats as they won the FAI Cup after a 53-year wait with a 2–0 win over Derry City at the Aviva Stadium, with Christy Fagan immortalising himself with the club's fans by scoring a brace. Fagan also won the 2014 League of Ireland Golden Boot with 20 goals as well as being voted the PFAI Player of the Year for 2014.

On 19 September 2015, the Saints won their third League of Ireland Cup, beating Galway United on penalties at Eamonn Deacy Park following a 0–0 draw after extra time, with young goalkeeper Conor O'Malley saving Andy O'Connell's final spot-kick to win the cup.

In 2016 the Saints knocked Jeunesse Esch of Luxembourg out of the UEFA Europa League on away goals before being narrowly beaten 2–1 on aggregate to Dinamo Minsk of Belarus in the second qualifying round. Pats finished 7th in the 2016 season, meaning they would be without European football for the first time in 7 years for 2017. They did, however, successfully retain their League of Ireland Cup crown, beating Limerick 4–1 in the final at the Markets Field with two goals from Conan Byrne and one each for Jamie McGrath and Graham Kelly.

The 2017 season was the first in a change of the League of Ireland layout, meaning the bottom three teams in the Premier Division would be relegated in order to make the league a 10-team division rather than a 12-team one. The season turned out to be a struggle for the Saints and they sat bottom of the table at the halfway point. The mid-season signings including fan favourite Killian Brennan, former Premier League midfielder Owen Garvan and particularly Dutch centre back Jordi Balk, proved to be pivotal as the club went on to win 6 of their last 11 games after picking up just 3 wins in their first 21 games of the season. They went into the last day of the season in need of a point away to Derry City, which they earned via a 1–1 draw with a goal from Killian Brennan keeping their record of never having been relegated intact.

The following season was a great improvement on the field as Pats sat in a European place at the halfway point in the league but later went on their worst losing streak in the club's history as they lost 8 games in a row, scoring just 3 goals along the way. They then managed to pick up their form, winning 4 out of 6 games but on 22 September 2018 the Saints suffered a 3–1 loss at home to a weakened Bohemians side with several of their under-19 side playing among the 11 changes to their previous starting 11. This turned out to be Liam Buckley's last game in charge of the club as it was announced on 25 September that Buckley had left his post by mutual consent after a 7-year spell in charge of the club.

Assistant manager to Buckley and former club captain Ger O'Brien took caretaker charge for the last 5 games of the season, the first of those being the Leinster Senior Cup Final which they lost on penalties against Shelbourne at Tolka Park. He also saw out a draw away to champions Dundalk and had an aggregate score of 9–0 against Limerick and Derry City as the club ended the season on a high note in 5th place.

=== The Harry Kenny months (October 2018 – August 2019) ===
On 24 October 2018 it was announced that Harry Kenny (who had been assistant manager in the 2013 league-winning campaign) would be the new manager of the club, signing a two-year contract. His new signings ahead of the 2019 season were Gary Shaw, David Webster, Ciaran Kelly, Cian Coleman, Georgie Poynton, Brandon Miele, Michael Drennan, Rhys McCabe and old fan favorite Chris Forrester, stating that his aim was to get the club back competing in European competition. Kenny's first competitive game in charge of the Saints was on 15 February 2019, a 1–0 opening-day victory over league runners-up Cork City at Richmond Park, with the game attracting the biggest attendance at a domestic game since October 2010. This was followed by a sell-out against rivals Shamrock Rovers on 8 March. On 25 April 2019 it was announced that the club had been awarded a licence to compete in UEFA Europa League action for the 2019–20 campaign ahead of Waterford, who had finished one place ahead of Pats in fourth place the previous season, but were not awarded a licence due to their club reforming in late 2016 and thus breaking UEFA's 'three-year rule'. Pats drew IFK Norrköping of Sweden and were beaten 2–0 at home and 2–1 away, knocking them out at the first hurdle. With the team scoring just 24 goals in 29 games and attendances steadily dropping, fans became restless with Kenny and after a shock cup exit to UCD on 23 August 2019, Kenny resigned by mutual consent the following day.

=== Stephen O'Donnell reign & FAI Cup win (August 2019 – December 2021) ===
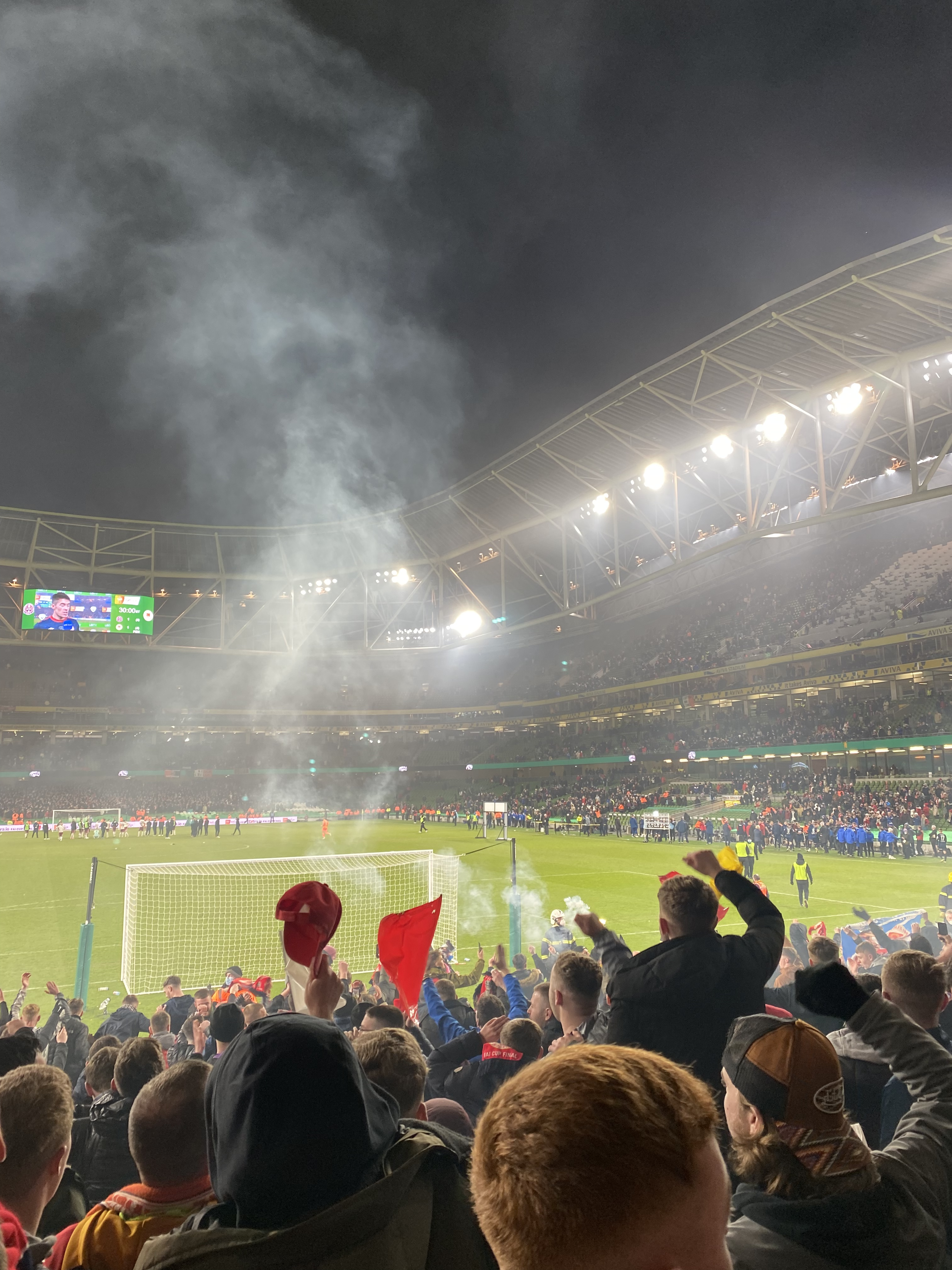
St Patrick's Athletic fans at the 2021 FAI Cup Final against Bohemians at the Aviva Stadium.

Former Dundalk captain Stephen O'Donnell was announced as the head coach on a two-year contract on 31 August 2019, his first job in senior management, following the resignation of Harry Kenny. His brought in his former Arsenal youth and Falkirk teammate (and former Pats player) Pat Cregg as his assistant. His first game in management came on 6 September 2019 as his Pats side came from behind to win 2−1 away to Finn Harps thanks to goals from Darragh Markey and substitute Rhys McCabe. The club finished in 5th place by the end of the season, missing out on a UEFA Europa League place but they did however win the 2018–19 Leinster Senior Cup, beating Wexford 3–0 in the Fourth Round (under Harry Kenny), Cabinteely 1–0 in the Quarter Final, with Under 19's manager Jamie Moore managing a side made up of Under 15, Under 17 and Under 19's players in the Semi Final (beating Sheriff YC 3–1 away) and Final (beating Athlone Town 4–0), as both games were scheduled after the senior team's season had finished.

O'Donnell's first pre-season saw him make wholesale changes to the squad, releasing 10 players including some who were still in contract and bringing in 9 new signings; Jason McClelland, Robbie Benson, Conor Kearns, Rory Feely, Shane Griffin, Billy King, Dan Ward, Martin Rennie and Ollie Younger. The season was hit by the COVID-19 pandemic after 4 games and following 4 months of postponements, a decision was made to half the season from 36 games to 18. The season finished in disappointment for Pats as they missed out on European football on the final day of the season, while they had previously been knocked out of the FAI Cup in the First Round by Finn Harps.

The 2021 season was a hugely successful one for the club, as they secured a 2nd-place finish, securing UEFA Europa Conference League football for 2022, as well as winning the 2021 FAI Cup by beating Bohemians in a penalty shootout in the Final, in front of an Aviva Stadium FAI Cup Final record crowd of 37,126.

=== Tim Clancy spell (December 2021 – May 2023) ===
On 2 December 2021, just 4 days after the club's 2021 FAI Cup Final win, it was announced that Tim Clancy had joined the club on a 2-year contract to replace the outgoing Stephen O'Donnell, whose controversial departure to Dundalk had yet to be confirmed amid a legal battle between the clubs. In late December 2021 a High Court action was filed against O'Donnell by the club.

On 26 January 2022, it was announced that the club had sold academy graduate James Abankwah to Italian Serie A side Udinese for an undisclosed fee believed to a record fee paid for a League of Ireland player, in the region of €800,000 plus add-ons.

On 2 May 2022, it was announced that the clubs would enter the 2022–23 UEFA Europa Conference League at the Second Qualifying round, rather than the First, following UEFA's decision to ban Russian clubs from competing in their competitions for the season.

Clancy's first taste of managing in European football came with a 1–1 draw at home to Slovenian side NŠ Mura. The second leg saw his side advance 6–5 on penalties following a 0–0 draw after extra time. The next round saw Pat's beat Bulgarian side CSKA Sofia 1–0 away before suffering the heartache of a 2–0 loss in the second leg at Tallaght Stadium following a controversial late penalty. On 2 May 2023, Clancy departed the club by mutual consent with this side in 7th place, 13 games into the 2023 season. Assistant manager Jon Daly took charge of the team on an interim basis.

=== Jon Daly's men – More Cup success (May 2023 – May 2024) ===
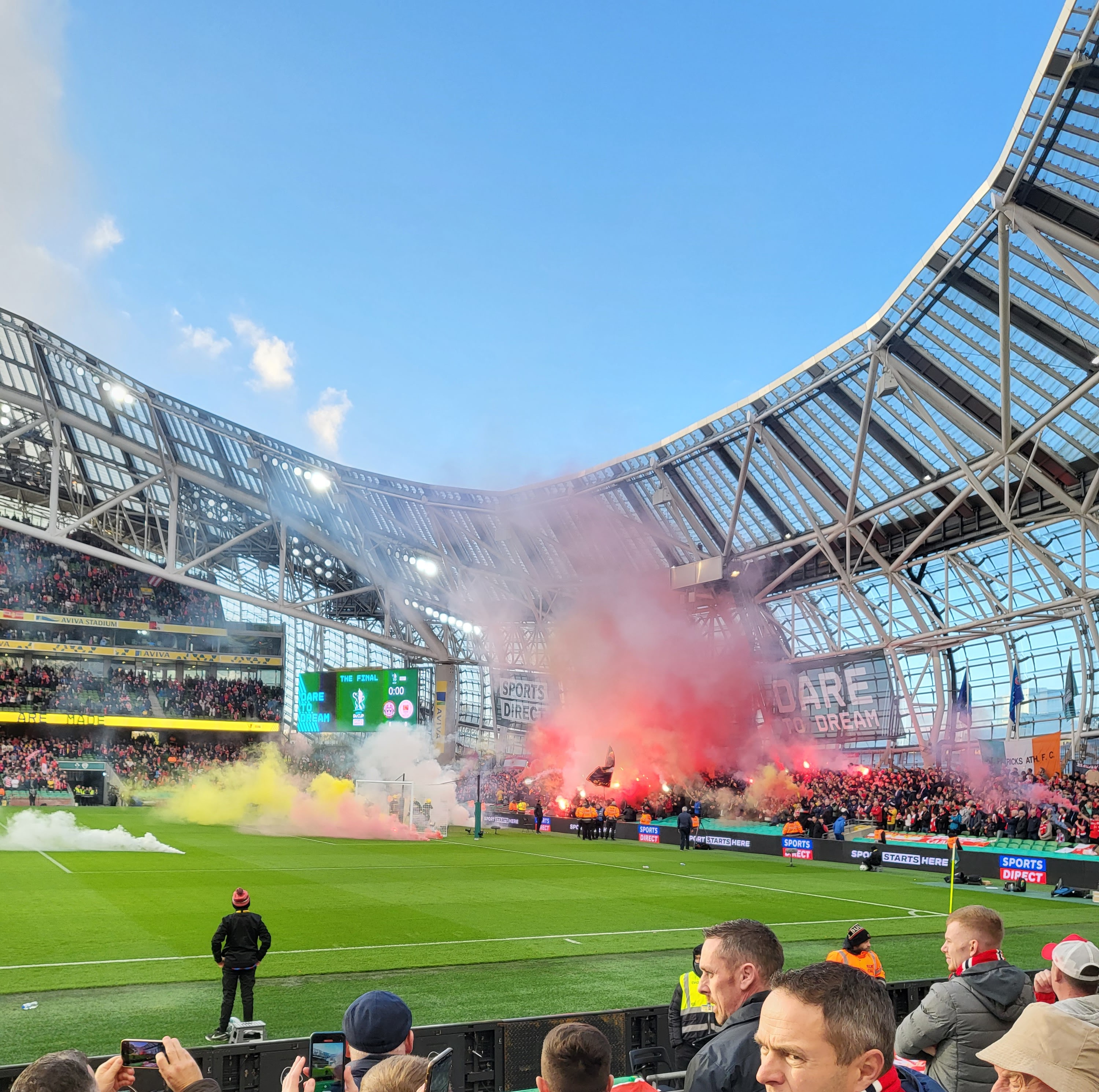
St Patrick's Athletic fans at the 2023 FAI Cup Final against Bohemians at the Aviva Stadium.

After winning 3 of his 4 games as interim manager, it was announced on 22 May 2023 that Jon Daly had received the role of manager on a permanent basis, on a contract until the end of 2025. The club's 2023 European campaign was short as they failed at the first hurdle, losing 2–1 away and 3–2 at home to F91 Dudelange, of Luxembourg.

On 12 November 2023, Daly led the club to a fifth FAI Cup title, as his side won the 2023 FAI Cup Final, beating rivals Bohemians 3–1 in front of a record breaking FAI Cup Final crowd of 43,881 at the Aviva Stadium. On 1 December 2023, Chris Forrester was named PFAI Player of the Year and Sam Curtis was named PFAI Young Player of the Year for their stellar performances throughout 2023.

On 9 February 2024, Pat's competed in the 2024 President of Ireland's Cup, but were defeated 3–1 by Shamrock Rovers at Tallaght Stadium.

In March 2024, ahead of a friendly fixture away to Major League Soccer side Minnesota United, the club announced American investment group Kenosis Sports Group, including NFL and NHL athletes Joe Flacco, Chad Greenway, Matt Birk and Anders Lee, as strategic investors into St Patrick's Athletic.

On 7 May 2024, it was announced that Daly had been relieved of his duties as manager with the club in 7th place following 7 defeats in their opening 15 games of the 2024 season.

=== Stephen Kenny era (May 2024–present) ===
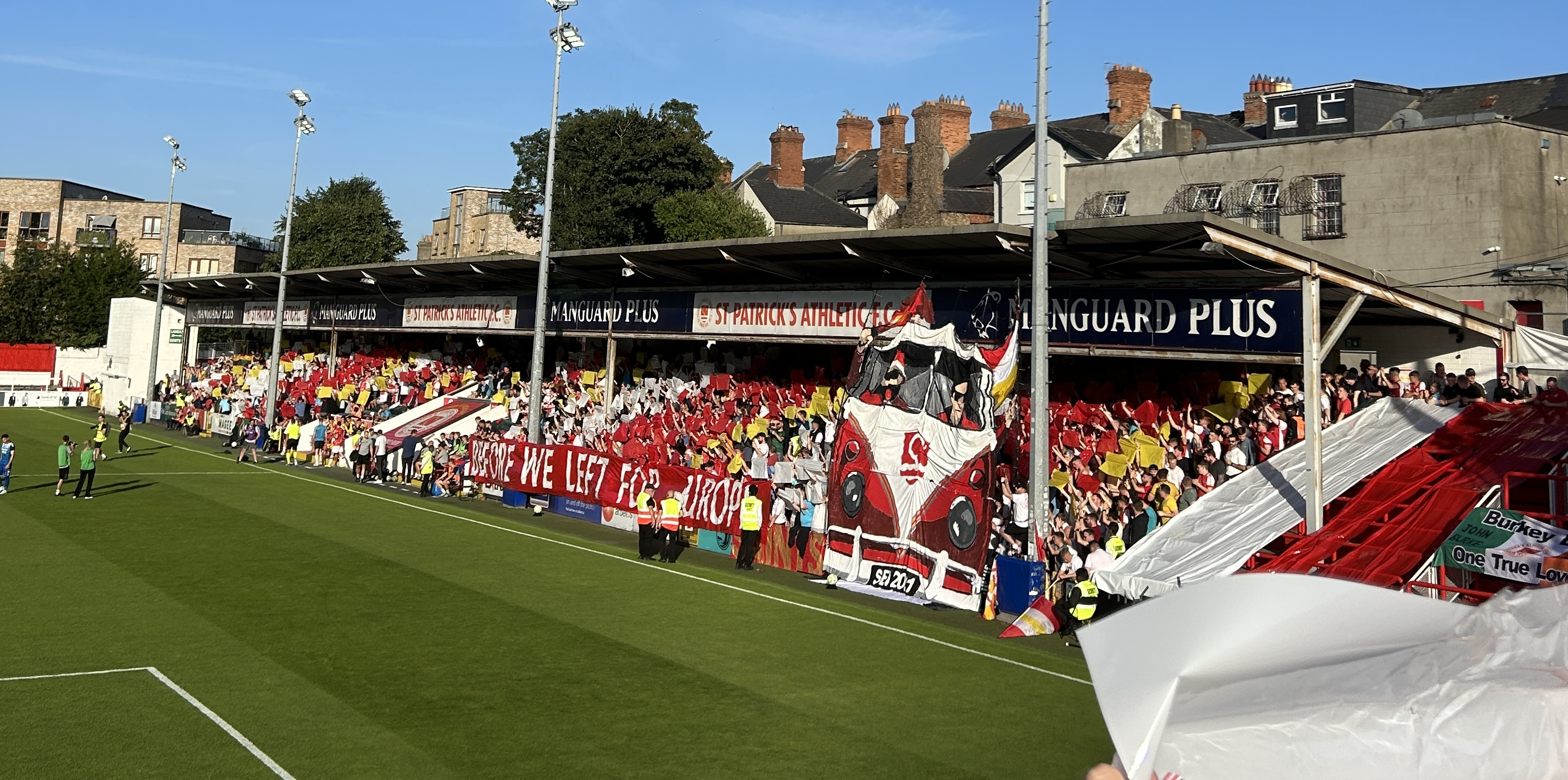
St Patrick's Athletic fans at the UEFA Conference League fixture against Hegelmann at the Richmond Park in July 2025.

On 16 May 2024, the club announced a major coup, by appointing the most recent Republic of Ireland national team manager Stephen Kenny, as their manager on a contract until the end of the 2029 season. On 25 July 2024, Kenny took charge of his first European fixture with the club, beating Vaduz of Liechtenstein 3–1 in a UEFA Conference League tie at Richmond Park, with Jake Mulraney scoring a brace and captain Joe Redmond heading home a third goal. A 2–2 draw away to Vaduz then set up a tie with Sabah of Azerbaijan, who Kenny's side beat 1–0 at Tallaght Stadium before again winning 1–0 away at the Bank Respublika Arena. In the UEFA Conference League Play-Off Round, they faced Turkish side İstanbul Başakşehir, drawing 0–0 at Tallaght Stadium before narrowly being beaten 2–0 in the return leg at the Başakşehir Fatih Terim Stadium through 2 goals in the last 25 minutes while down to 10 men. On 8 October 2024, the club claimed its first trophy under Stephen Kenny when his second string side beat St Mochta's 2–1 in the final of the 2023–24 Leinster Senior Cup. With the club in 8th place in the table going into their game on 1 September 2024, Kenny guided his side to a club record equalling 9 consecutive league victories to secure 3rd place at the end of his first season at the club, securing UEFA Conference League football for the following season.

On 4 February 2025, the club agreed the transfer of Mason Melia to Premier League club Tottenham Hotspur, commencing on 1 January 2026 for an undisclosed record transfer fee for a League of Ireland player, reported to be €2 million up front, rising to €4 million with add-ons, plus a 20% sell on clause.

The 2025 season saw Pats go on another European run, as their UEFA Conference League campaign saw them beat Lithuanian side Hegelmann 1–0 at home and 2–0 away which become the club's record away victory in Europe, then beating Estonian club Nõmme Kalju 1–0 at home then drawing 2–2 away in the second leg after extra time to send them through. The Third Qualifying Round saw them face Turkish giants Beşiktaş, in which they found themselves 4–0 down at half time in the first leg at Tallaght Stadium, then won the second half by a goal, before remarkably taking a 2–0 lead at Beşiktaş Stadium in the second leg to narrow the aggregate deficit to just 1 goal with 48 minutes of the tie left, before eventually being defeated 3–2 on the night and 7–3 on aggregate. Kenny's first full season with the club proved to be a disappointment overall, despite having the most clean sheets and least goals conceded in the league, they missed out on a European place by finishing in 5th place, lost to bottom of the table Cork City in the Semi Final of the FAI Cup and were defeated by First Division side Dundalk in the Final of the Leinster Senior Cup.

In June 2026, goalkeeper Joseph Anang was called up to the Ghana squad for the 2026 FIFA World Cup, making him the club's first ever current player to be called up to the tournament. That same month, Kian Leavy was called up to the senior Republic of Ireland squad for a friendly away to Canada, becoming the first current Pat's player to be called up in 55 years, since Noel Campbell in 1971 and was capped after coming off the bench in a 1–1 draw.they finished third in the League of Ireland that season narrowly missing out after losing a lot of games after they got garinteed European qualification it was a disappointing end to a good season.

== Kits ==
=== Home kits ===
1930s	1975–76	1980–82	1982–83	1989–90	1990–91

1991–92	1992–94	1994–95	1997–98	2004	2005–06

2007–08	2009	2010–11	2012	2013	2014–15

2016–17	2018–19	2020	2021	2022	2023

2024	2025

The club's first kit was a red shirt with a white collar and a white chevron, with white shorts and red socks. Since then they have changed to a kit of a red jersey with white sleeves, white shorts and red socks.

=== Away kits ===
1990–92	1992–94	1994–96	1999–2000	2001–2002	2003

2004	2005–06	2006–07	2008–09	2010–11	2012

2013–14	2015–16	2017–18	2019	2020	2021

2022	2023	2024	2025

The most frequent away colours used by Pats are navy/blue but over the years they have ventured outside of the ordinary.

=== Third kits ===
2004	2008	2010	2011	2013	2016–17

2018–19	2023	2024–25

The club have released some dedicated third kits in recent years, while in years that they haven't, they've usually used the previous seasons away kit as a third kit. In February 2026, club announced a collaboration with The Wolfe Tones which saw them release a Wolfe Tones third kit, including their logo in place of a sponsor.

=== Kit manufacturers and sponsors ===
Years	Manufacturers	Shirt sponsors (front)
1930–1974	Unknown	None
1975–1976	(England) Admiral	None
1976–1978	Unknown	None
1978–1979	(Republic of Ireland) O'Neills	None
1979–1980	(Germany) Adidas	Adidas
1980–1982	(Germany) Adidas	None
1982–1984	(Germany) Adidas	Ideal Motors
1984–1985	(Germany) Adidas	None
1985–1986	(Germany) Adidas	Des Kelly Carpets
1986–1987	(Germany) Adidas	None
1987–1988	(Republic of Ireland) O'Neills	Elan
1988–1989	(England) Umbro	Elan
1989–1990	(England) Spall	DHL
1990–1991	(England) Spall	Peat Briquettes
1991–1992	(England) Gola	First Citizen
1992–1994	(Republic of Ireland) O'Neills	Aircare
1994–1995	(England) Spall	Liberty Air Technology
1995	(England) Spall	Carglass
1995–2003	(Republic of Ireland) O'Neills	Autoglass
2004	(England) Umbro	Autoglass
2005–2006	(England) Umbro	Smart Telecom
2007	(England) Umbro	McDowell's
2007–2009	(England) Umbro	Paddy Power
2010–2012	(England) Umbro	Nissan
2013–2016	(England) Umbro	Clune Construction Company L.P.
2017	(England) Umbro	Pieta House
2018–2021	(England) Umbro	MIG Insurance Brokers
2022–2025	(England) Umbro	Manguard Plus
2026–	(England) Umbro	Clune (Home kit)
2026–	(England) Umbro	Elliott Group (Away kit)
2026–	(England) Umbro	The Wolfe Tones (Third kit)

== Fans ==
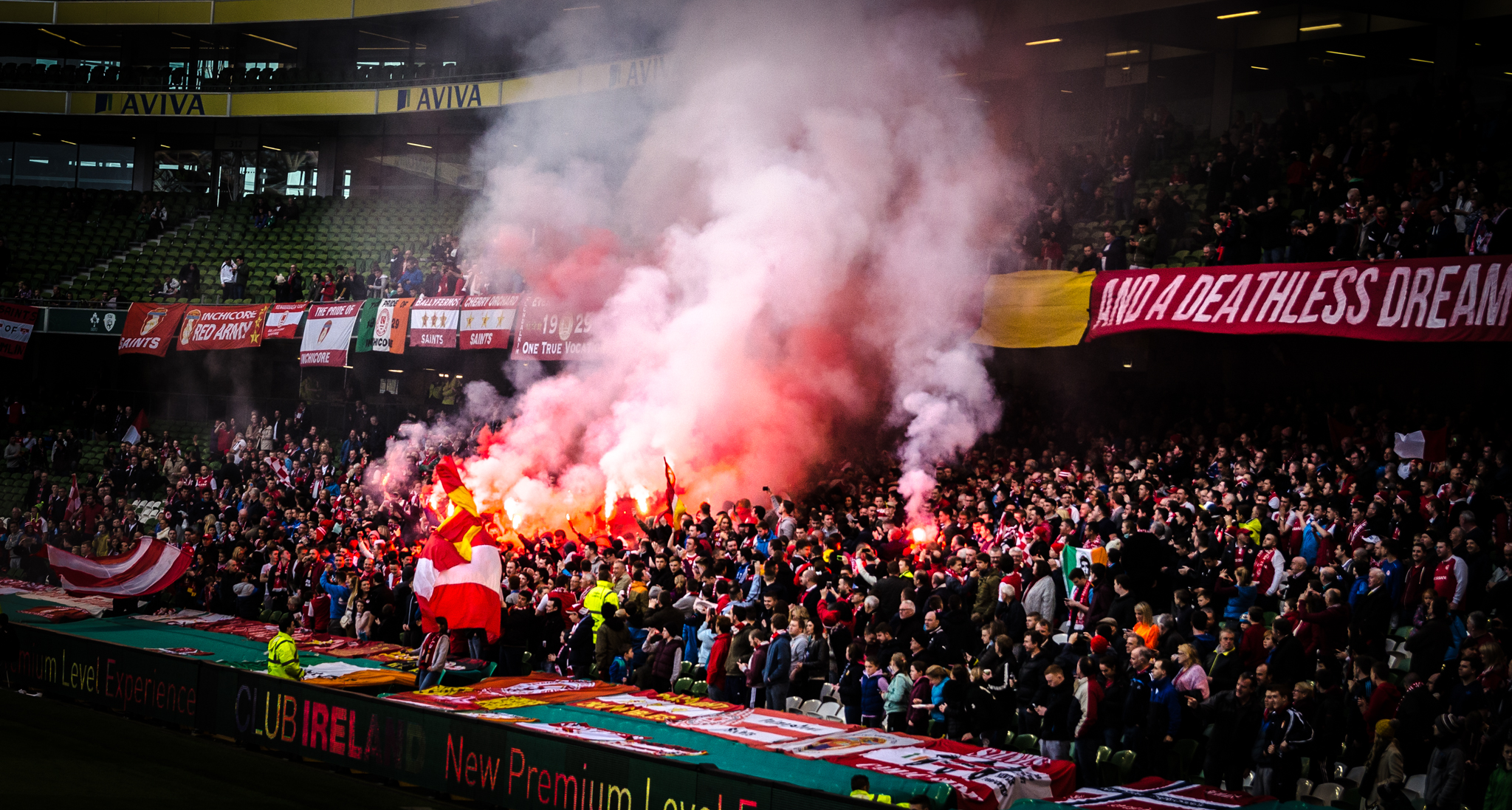
Pats fans at the 2014 FAI Cup Final against Derry City at the Aviva Stadium.

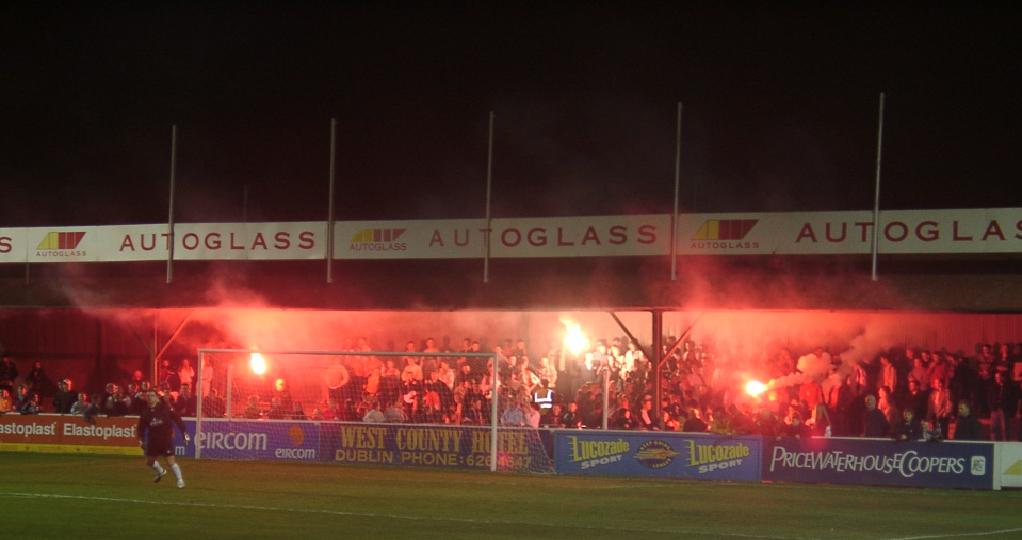
Pats fans in the Shed End.

Saints fans have widely become known as some of the most active and vocal throughout the country. Throughout the club's history, any period of turmoil was always met with protest by the loyal saints. In 2001, an ultras group called the Shed End Invincibles were set up, for four years they created huge tifo displays, choreographed chants and created Richmond Park into a fortress. After a period of exile, the ultras group were reignited under new leadership. Since then, their work has been applauded by other fans. Big banners, flares, and smoke screens are a common sight at St Pats matches. Overseas visitors are regularly found at Richmond Park on a match night, including a Norwegian Pats' supporters club. As well as this, the club's supporters share friendships with supporters of clubs like such as Ravenna from Italy, Sheffield United of England, and Hannover 96 of Germany. Fans of these clubs, along with Pats fans, regularly travel to one another's matches. Famous fans include former Irish manager Brian Kerr, American actor Wendell Pierce and ex-Ireland player Glenn Whelan.

Other famous fans of the club are the members of Irish Republican ballad group The Wolfe Tones who in February 2026 collaborated with the club on a third kit reassuring their logo and lyrics from Let the People Sing, with member Brian Warfield stating at the launch that "We're here celebrating the launch of a new jersey for our local side The Saints and we're very proud to do so. I think it's important to support local and that's why we've done this collaboration between The Wolfe Tones and the club, I've been following St Patrick's since I was about five or six, I went to the matches with my dad, we were mad Pat's fans in Inchicore. Our recreation every second week was to go to the home games and some away too if they weren't too far. Music was always part of our lives and part of football. My family, including generations of my grandads and great grandads and my dad, all worked in the Inchicore Works, so we have a long history of being part of Inchicore. It's a wonderful area and we've always loved St Pat's, our connection with The Saints will last forever. Let the people sing."

== Community ==
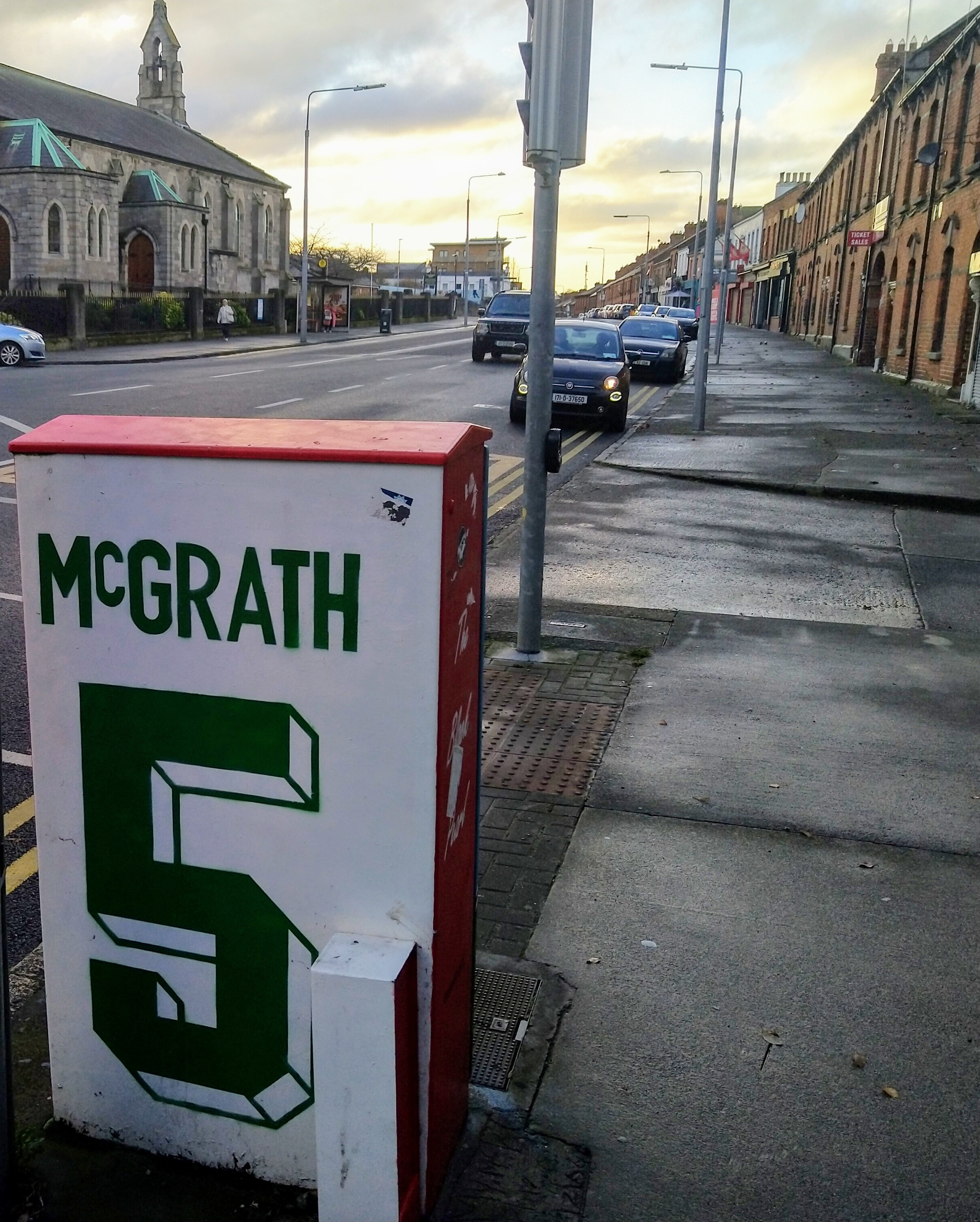
Street art dedicated to former player Paul McGrath on Emmet Road outside Richmond Park.

The club motto is Ní neart go cur le chéile (as Gaeilge). It translates to No strength without unity. St Patrick's Athletic is strongly linked with Inchicore and the local southwest Dublin community. In 2020 the club used Richmond Park as a hub for a food bank to provide supplies to the vulnerable. Such is the club's dedication to embedding itself in the community, they employ a full time Community Officer, who runs a long list of programmes such as the educational Primary School Community Programme in local schools.

=== Women's Football ===
In 1996 St Patrick's Athletic F.C. took over the local women's football team O'Connell Chics. The most notable former player is Emma Byrne who is the record appearance holder for the Republic of Ireland Women's National Team, with the Saints being Byrne's first senior club.

In 2022, club legend Ian Bermingham was appointed as Football Partnership Manager between St Patrick's Athletic and Cherry Orchard and part of the partnership, the club will be progressing with their plans to field a team in the Women's National U17 League from the 2023 season onwards.

== Players ==
=== First-team squad ===
As of 13 November 2026

Note: Flags indicate national team as defined under FIFA eligibility rules; some limited exceptions apply. Players may hold more than one non-FIFA nationality.

No.	Pos.	Nation	Player
2	DF	IRL	Seán Hoare
3	DF	IRL	Anthony Breslin
4	DF	IRL	Joe Redmond (captain)
6	MF	IRL	Jamie Lennon
7	MF	IRL	Zack Elbouzedi
8	MF	IRL	Chris Forrester (vice-captain)
9	FW	IRL	Aidan Keena
10	MF	IRL	Kian Leavy
11	MF	IRL	Jason McClelland
15	DF	IRL	Ronan Boyce
16	MF	IRL	Darragh Nugent
17	MF	ENG	Romal Palmer
19	MF	NIR	Barry Baggley
21	FW	FIN	Anthony Olusanya

No.	Pos.	Nation	Player
22	FW	CIV	Yssouf Soro
23	DF	IRL	James Brown
24	DF	IRL	Luke Turner
25	MF	IRL	Simon Power
27	FW	ENG	Ryan Edmondson
30	DF	IRL	Josh O'Connor
32	DF	IRL	Billy Canny
33	DF	IRL	Sean McHale
34	MF	IRL	Kian Quigley
35	FW	IRL	Sam Rooney
37	MF	IRL	Joe Carroll-Byrne
48	MF	IRL	Ryan Sheridan
49	GK	IRL	Sean Molloy
94	GK	GHA	Joseph Anang

=== Academy ===
Players from the academy squads that are on professional contracts with the club and/or have been named in a first team match day squad in cup competitions.

Note: Flags indicate national team as defined under FIFA eligibility rules; some limited exceptions apply. Players may hold more than one non-FIFA nationality.

No.	Pos.	Nation	Player
28	MF	IRL	Rhys Bartley
31	MF	IRL	Billy Hayes
39	DF	IRL	Sam Steward
40	DF	IRL	Kimson Kibaga
43	GK	IRL	Darragh Brunton
44	GK	IRL	Luke Cullen
46	MF	IRL	Niall Sullivan
47	MF	IRL	Sammy Ogungbe
50	DF	MDA	Ivan Graminschii

No.	Pos.	Nation	Player
51	FW	IRL	Ashley Okeowo
52	DF	IRL	Féilim Dikčius
53	MF	IRL	Jason Spelman
54	MF	IRL	Harry Leonard
55	DF	IRL	Cian Doyle
—	MF	IRL	Blake Devereux Lynch
—	GK	IRL	Sebastian Clarke
—	MF	IRL	Rhys Williams

== Technical staff ==
Position	Staff
First-team Manager	Stephen Kenny
Assistant coach	Brian Gartland
Technical coach	Alan Murphy
Goalkeeping coach	Pat Jennings
Head of Performance Analysis	Chris Jenkins
Head of Performance	
Assistant Head of Performance	Harry Cornally
Sports Performance Coach	Kevin McManamon
Director of Football	Ger O'Brien
Technical Director	Alan Mathews
Equipment Manager	David McGill
Head of Academy Football	Ian Bermingham
Lead Academy Player Development Coach	Karl Lambe
Academy Lead Strength & Conditioning Coach	James McCrudden
Academy Strength & Conditioning Coach	Brian Hayes

== Youth structure ==
The club field an Under-20, an Under-17, an Under-15 and an Under-14 team that compete in the League of Ireland U20 Division, League of Ireland U17 Division, League of Ireland U15 Division and League of Ireland U14 Division respectively.

=== NUI Maynooth Scholarship Scheme ===
Set up in 2010, St Patrick's Athletic have a scholarship scheme in place with NUI Maynooth. The scheme allows Pats to offer young players the opportunity to play with the club's Youth sides whilst undergoing their third-level studies on a sports scholarship. There is a big St Pats influence in the scheme with the Soccer Development Officer at Maynooth being former Pats defender Barry Prenderville as well as club captain Ger O'Brien managing the side to their first-ever Collingwood Cup win in 2014, with teammate Brendan Clarke as his assistant. The scholarship scheme is a big asset to St Pats, as it helps attract the top young talent in the country to the club ahead of their rivals. The scheme has also been a huge success, with the Saints Under-19s side winning the Dr. Tony O'Neill Cup in 2015 to become the best side in the country, as well as a whole host of players graduating from the Youth Setup into the First Team squad. Among the top players to have come through the Programme are Jake Carroll, Seán Hoare, Jamie McGrath, Darragh Markey, Ciaran Kelly, Paul Rooney and Fuad Sule among others.

=== Youth Club Affiliations ===
In 2016, the club opted to disband their own youth teams that played in the Dublin & District Schoolboys Leagues, moving forward into a new model for the League of Ireland Under-19, Under-17 and up-and-coming Under-15s leagues. Pats struck up Affiliations with 4 of Ireland's top schoolboy clubs Crumlin United, Belvedere, Cherry Orchard and Esker Celtic in the best interest of both clubs and their players/facilities. On 1 March 2016, the Saints announced an Affiliation Agreement with the local side Crumlin United, one of the country's top schoolboy clubs, to improve Pats Youth Setup while also benefiting Crumlin and their young players. On 29 March 2017, the Saints announced an official partnership with Belvedere. On 24 May 2017 St Patrick's Athletic announced an official partnership with local Ballyfermot side Cherry Orchard. On 13 July 2018 St Patrick's Athletic announced an official partnership with Lucan side Esker Celtic.

==== Cherry Orchard partnership ====
In June 2022, it was announced that a new football partnership had been made between Pat's and Cherry Orchard which would see the clubs work together exclusively, with the aim of the partnership to provide players from Cherry Orchard with a pathway to the academy and to senior League of Ireland football for both boys and girls, with Pat's also creating a new full-time Football Partnership Manager role to oversee the partnership.

==== Former academy players ====
Players in Bold have senior international caps

- (Republic of Ireland) **James Abankwah**
- (Republic of Ireland) Ryan Burke
- (Republic of Ireland) Darragh Burns
- (Republic of Ireland) Jake Carroll
- (Republic of Ireland) Brendan Clarke
- (Republic of Ireland) Kian Corbally
- (Republic of Ireland) Kevin Cornwall
- (Republic of Ireland) Rob Cornwall
- (Republic of Ireland) Sam Curtis
- (Republic of Ireland) James Doona
- (Republic of Ireland) **Kevin Doyle**
- (Republic of Ireland) Rory Feely
- (Republic of Ireland) Derek Foran
- (Republic of Ireland) Luke Heeney
- (Republic of Ireland) Seán Hoare
- (Republic of Ireland) Conor Kane
- (Nigeria) Dare Kareem
- (Republic of Ireland) Cian Kavanagh
- (Republic of Ireland) Jordan Keegan
- (Republic of Ireland) **Josh Keeley**
- (Republic of Ireland) Aidan Keena
- (Republic of Ireland) Ciarán Kelly
- (Republic of Ireland) Stephen Kenny
- (Republic of Ireland) **Kian Leavy**
- (Republic of Ireland) Jamie Lennon
- (Republic of Ireland) Darius Lipsiuc
- (Republic of Ireland) Tommy Lonergan
- (Republic of Ireland) Jonathan Lunney
- (Republic of Ireland) Brian Maher
- (Republic of Ireland) Ian Maher
- (Republic of Ireland) Darragh Markey
- (Republic of Ireland) John Martin
- (Republic of Ireland) Ben McCormack
- (Republic of Ireland) **Jamie McGrath**
- (Republic of Ireland) Dara McGuinness
- (Republic of Ireland) Sean McHale
- (Republic of Ireland) Luke McNally
- (Republic of Ireland) **Mason Melia**
- (Republic of Ireland) Adam Murphy
- (Republic of Ireland) Michael Noonan
- (Republic of Ireland) Ger O'Brien
- (Republic of Ireland) Kevin O'Connor
- (Republic of Ireland) Conor Pepper
- (Republic of Ireland) Ben Quinn
- (Republic of Ireland) **Stephen Quinn**
- (Republic of Ireland) Kyle Robinson
- (Republic of Ireland) Paul Rooney
- (Republic of Ireland) Sam Rooney
- (Republic of Ireland) Ryan Sheridan
- (Nigeria) Fuad Sule
- (Republic of Ireland) Jake Walker

== Honours ==
Competition	Winners	Seasons	Runners-up	Seasons
National competitions
League of Ireland / Premier Division	8	1951–52, 1954–55, 1955–56, 1989–90, 1995–96, 1997–98, 1998–99, 2013	5	1960–61, 1987–88, 2007, 2008, 2021
FAI Cup	5	1958–59, 1960–61, 2014, 2021, 2023	8	1953–54, 1966–67, 1973–74, 1979–80, 1995–96, 2003, 2006, 2012
President of Ireland's Cup	1	2014	3	2015, 2022, 2024
League of Ireland Cup (discontinued)	4	2000–01, 2003, 2015, 2016	2	1979–80, 1992–93
League of Ireland Shield (discontinued)	1	1959–60	2	1957–58, 1966–67
Dublin City Cup (discontinued)	3	1953–54, 1955–56, 1975–76	0	
FAI Super Cup (discontinued)	1	1999–2000	1	1998–99
Provincial, Intermediate, Junior and All-Ireland competitions
Leinster Senior Cup	10	1947–48, 1982–83, 1986–87, 1989–90, 1990–91, 1999–2000, 2010–11, 2013–14, 2018–19, 2023–24	10	1950–51, 1953–54, 1955–56, 1963–64, 1980–81, 1987–88, 2012–13, 2017–18, 2024–25, 2025–26
Leinster Senior League	6	1947–48, 1948–49, 1949–50, 1950–51, 1955–56, 1956–57	0	
FAI Intermediate Cup	3	1947–48, 1948–49, 1952–53	0	
FAI Junior Cup	1	1940–41	0	
FAI Youth Cup	1	1944–45	0	
LFA President's Cup (discontinued)	6	1952–53, 1953–54, 1955–56, 1971–72, 1990–91, 1996–97	8	1956–57, 1959–60, 1961–62, 1969–70, 1974–75, 1980–81, 1988–89, 1998–99
Setanta Sports Cup (discontinued)	0		1	2009–10

== Notable players ==
=== Internationals ===
Republic of Ireland internationals

- (Republic of Ireland) James Abankwah
- (Republic of Ireland) Synan Braddish
- (Republic of Ireland) Ray Brady
- (Republic of Ireland) Liam Buckley
- (Republic of Ireland) Noel Campbell
- (Republic of Ireland) George Cummins
- (Republic of Ireland) Kevin Doyle
- (Republic of Ireland) Tommy Dunne
- (Republic of Ireland) Keith Fahey
- (Republic of Ireland) Curtis Fleming
- (Republic of Ireland) Matty Geoghegan
- (Republic of Ireland) Shay Gibbons
- (Republic of Ireland) Eamonn Gregg
- (Republic of Ireland) Alfie Hale
- (Republic of Ireland) Jimmy Hartnett
- (Republic of Ireland) Joe Haverty
- (Republic of Ireland) Jackie Hennessy
- (Republic of Ireland) Mick Kearin
- (Republic of Ireland) Josh Keeley
- (Republic of Ireland) Shay Keogh
- (Republic of Ireland) Mick Leech
- (Republic of Ireland) Kian Leavy
- (Republic of Ireland) Dinny Lowry
- (Republic of Ireland) Jamie McGrath
- (Republic of Ireland) Paul McGrath
- (Republic of Ireland) Mason Melia
- (Republic of Ireland) Barry Murphy (born 1959)
- (Republic of Ireland) Joe O'Cearuill
- (Republic of Ireland) Eamonn O'Keefe
- (Republic of Ireland) Frank O'Neill
- (Republic of Ireland) Stephen Quinn
- (Republic of Ireland) Enda Stevens
- (Republic of Ireland) Freddie Strahan
- (Republic of Ireland) Keith Treacy
- (Republic of Ireland) Ronnie Whelan Snr.

League of Ireland XI representatives

- (Republic of Ireland) Killian Brennan
- (Republic of Ireland) Liam Buckley
- (Republic of Ireland) Damien Byrne
- (Republic of Ireland) Jody Byrne
- (Republic of Ireland) Jimmy Collins
- (Republic of Ireland) Fergus Crawford
- (Republic of Ireland) Robbie Gaffney
- (Republic of Ireland) Tommy Gaynor
- (Republic of Ireland) Eddie Gormley
- (Republic of Ireland) Eamonn Gregg
- (Republic of Ireland) Ben Hannigan
- (Republic of Ireland) Jackie Jameson
- (Republic of Ireland) Daryl Kavanagh
- (Republic of Ireland) Mick Kearin
- (Republic of Ireland) Dermot Keely
- (Republic of Ireland) Conor Kenna
- (Republic of Ireland) Shay Keogh
- (Republic of Ireland) Alan Kirby
- (Republic of Ireland) Mick Leech
- (Republic of Ireland) John McDonnell
- (Republic of Ireland) Dave Mulcahy
- (Republic of Ireland) Barry Murphy (born 1985)
- (Republic of Ireland) Ger O'Brien
- (Republic of Ireland) Tony O'Connor
- (Republic of Ireland) Ken Oman
- (Republic of Ireland) David Parkes
- (Republic of Ireland) Gavin Peers
- (Republic of Ireland) Aidan Price
- (Republic of Ireland) Gary Rogers
- (Republic of Ireland) John Russell
- (Republic of Ireland) Freddie Strahan
- (Republic of Ireland) Ronnie Whelan Snr
- (Cameroon) Joseph N'Do
- (Guam) Ryan Guy

Republic of Ireland B internationals

- (Republic of Ireland) Dan Connor
- (Republic of Ireland) Pat Fenlon
- (Republic of Ireland) Martin Russell

Republic of Ireland U23 internationals

- (Republic of Ireland) Kenny Browne
- (Republic of Ireland) James Chambers
- (Republic of Ireland) Brendan Clarke
- (Republic of Ireland) Billy Dennehy
- (Republic of Ireland) Shane Guthrie
- (Republic of Ireland) Conor Kenna
- (Republic of Ireland) Paul McGee
- (Republic of Ireland) David McMillan
- (Republic of Ireland) Barry Murphy (born 1985)
- (Republic of Ireland) Gavin Peers
- (Republic of Ireland) Ger O'Brien
- (Republic of Ireland) Mark Quigley
- (Republic of Ireland) Ger Rowe

Republic of Ireland U21 internationals

- (Republic of Ireland) Martin Bayly
- (Republic of Ireland) Ian Bermingham
- (Republic of Ireland) Stephen Bradley
- (Republic of Ireland) Paul Byrne
- (Republic of Ireland) Aaron Callaghan
- (Republic of Ireland) Pat Cregg
- (Republic of Ireland) Dan Connor
- (Republic of Ireland) Sam Curtis
- (Republic of Ireland) Ian Daly
- (Republic of Ireland) Clive Delaney
- (Republic of Ireland) Lee Desmond
- (Republic of Ireland) Pat Dolan
- (Republic of Ireland) Robbie Doyle
- (Republic of Ireland) Christy Fagan
- (Republic of Ireland) Rory Feely
- (Republic of Ireland) Pat Fenlon
- (Republic of Ireland) Michael Foley
- (Republic of Ireland) Chris Forrester
- (Republic of Ireland) Keith Foy
- (Republic of Ireland) Robbie Gaffney
- (Republic of Ireland) Owen Garvan
- (Republic of Ireland) Jason Gavin
- (Republic of Ireland) Liam George
- (Republic of Ireland) Eddie Gormley
- (Republic of Ireland) Ronan Hale
- (Republic of Ireland) Colin Hawkins
- (Republic of Ireland) Dave Henderson
- (Republic of Ireland) Seán Hoare
- (Republic of Ireland) Brandon Kavanagh
- (Republic of Ireland) Conor Kearns
- (Republic of Ireland) Alan Kirby
- (Republic of Ireland) Mark Leech
- (Republic of Ireland) Jamie Lennon
- (Republic of Ireland) Darius Lipsiuc
- (Republic of Ireland) Tommy Lonergan
- (Republic of Ireland) Brian Maher
- (Republic of Ireland) Stephen Maher
- (Republic of Ireland) Jamie McGrath
- (Republic of Ireland) Jason McGuinness
- (Republic of Ireland) Mason Melia
- (Republic of Ireland) Trevor Molloy
- (Republic of Ireland) Thomas Morgan
- (Republic of Ireland) Ian Morris
- (Republic of Ireland) Adam Murphy
- (Republic of Ireland) Michael Noonan
- (Republic of Ireland) Glory Nzingo
- (Republic of Ireland) Tony O'Dowd
- (Republic of Ireland) Alex O'Hanlon
- (Republic of Ireland) Ken Oman
- (Republic of Ireland) Stephen Paisley
- (Republic of Ireland) Joe Redmond
- (Republic of Ireland) Enda Stevens
- (Republic of Ireland) Mark Timlin

Other internationals

- (Australia) Con Blatsis
- (Burundi) Aime Kitenge
- (Cameroon) Joseph N'Do
- (Canada) Jeff Clarke
- (Canada) Tyson Farago
- (Czech Republic) Vítězslav Jaroš
- (England) Gordon Banks
- (England) Barry Bridges
- (England) Terry Venables
- (Equatorial Guinea) Baba Issaka
- (Estonia) Vladislav Kreida
- (Finland) Anthony Olusanya
- (Ghana) Joseph Anang
- (Guam) Ryan Guy
- (Hong Kong) John Moore
- (Liberia) George Miller
- (Malta) Kyrian Nwoko
- (Northern Ireland) Ronan Hale
- (Northern Ireland) Ryan McLaughlin
- (Northern Ireland) Danny Trainor
- (Northern Ireland) Trevor Wood
- (New Zealand) Sean Byrne
- (New Zealand) Max Mata
- (Saint Lucia) Nahum Melvin-Lambert
- (Scotland) Neil Martin
- (Togo) Cyril Guedjé
- (Uganda) Charles Mbabazi Livingstone
- (Wales) David Partridge

FIFA World Cup squad members

- (Cameroon) Joseph N'Do
- (England) Gordon Banks
- (Ghana) Joseph Anang

=== Award winners ===
PFAI Players' Player of the Year;

- (Republic of Ireland) Paul McGrath (1981–82)
- (Republic of Ireland) Paddy Dillon (1987–88)
- (Republic of Ireland) Mark Ennis (1989–90)
- (Republic of Ireland) Eddie Gormley (1995–96)
- (Republic of Ireland) Paul Osam (1998–99)
- (Republic of Ireland) Keith Fahey (2008)
- (Republic of Ireland) Killian Brennan (2013)
- (Republic of Ireland) Christy Fagan (2014)
- (Republic of Ireland) Chris Forrester (2023)

PFAI Young Player of the Year

- (Republic of Ireland) Colin Hawkins (1997–98)
- (Republic of Ireland) Mark Quigley (2007)
- (Republic of Ireland) Chris Forrester (2012)
- (Republic of Ireland) Sam Curtis (2023)
- (Republic of Ireland) Mason Melia (2024)

SWAI Goalkeeper of the Year

- (Republic of Ireland) Brendan Clarke (2013)

League of Ireland Player of the Year;

- (Republic of Ireland) Colin Hawkins (1998)
- (Republic of Ireland) Paul Osam (1999)
- (Republic of Ireland) Killian Brennan (2013)

League of Ireland Player of the Month

- (Republic of Ireland) Sean Byrne
- (Republic of Ireland) Derek Carthy
- (Republic of Ireland) Jackie Jameson
- (Republic of Ireland) Paul McGrath
- (Republic of Ireland) Damien Byrne
- (Republic of Ireland) Mark Ennis
- (Republic of Ireland) Mick Moody
- (Republic of Ireland) Damien Byrne
- (Republic of Ireland) Dave Henderson
- (Republic of Ireland) Curtis Fleming
- (Republic of Ireland) John McDonnell
- (Republic of Ireland) Eddie Gormley
- (Republic of Ireland) Ricky O'Flaherty
- (Republic of Ireland) Dave Campbell
- (Republic of Ireland) Colin Hawkins
- (Republic of Ireland) Keith Doyle
- (Republic of Ireland) Thomas Morgan
- (Republic of Ireland) Trevor Molloy
- (Republic of Ireland) Martin Russell
- (Republic of Ireland) Liam Kelly
- (Uganda) Charles Mbabazi Livingstone
- (Republic of Ireland) Ger McCarthy
- (Republic of Ireland) Darragh Maguire
- (England) Chris Adamson
- (Republic of Ireland) Alan Kirby
- (Republic of Ireland) Keith Fahey
- (Republic of Ireland) Mark Quigley
- (Republic of Ireland) Declan O'Brien
- (Republic of Ireland) Conor Kenna
- (Republic of Ireland) Dave Mulcahy
- (England) Danny North
- (Republic of Ireland) Killian Brennan
- (Republic of Ireland) Anthony Flood
- (Republic of Ireland) Chris Forrester
- (Republic of Ireland) Christy Fagan
- (Republic of Ireland) Jake Mulraney
- (Republic of Ireland) Aidan Keena

Harry Boland Hall of Fame

- (Republic of Ireland) Jimmy 'Timber' Cummins (Inducted: 2009)
- (Republic of Ireland) John McDonnell (Inducted: 2009)
- (Republic of Ireland) Paul McGrath (Inducted: 2009)
- (Republic of Ireland) Paddy 'Ginger' O'Rourke (Inducted: 2009)
- (Republic of Ireland) Shay Gibbons (Inducted: 2009)
- (Republic of Ireland) Eddie Gormley (Inducted: 2009)
- (Republic of Ireland) Dave Henderson (Inducted: 2009)
- (Republic of Ireland) Paddy Dillon (Inducted: 2009)
- (Republic of Ireland) Mark Ennis (Inducted: 2009)
- (Republic of Ireland) Paul Osam (Inducted: 2009)
- (Republic of Ireland) Dinny Lowry (Inducted: 2010)
- (Republic of Ireland) Curtis Fleming (Inducted: 2010)
- (Republic of Ireland) Ricky O'Flaherty (Inducted: 2011)
- (Republic of Ireland) Tommy Dunne (Inducted: 2011)
- (Republic of Ireland) Brian Kerr ^{(Note 1)} (Inducted: 2014)
- (Republic of Ireland) Liam Buckley (Inducted: 2014)
- (Republic of Ireland) Noel Campbell (Inducted: 2022)
- (Republic of Ireland) Damien Byrne (Inducted: 2022)
- (Republic of Ireland) Ronnie Whelan Snr. (Inducted: 2022)

Notes

- ^1 Brian Kerr was a manager only.

St Patrick's Athletic Player of the Year

St Patrick's Athletic Player of the Year
2004: Keith Fahey; 2005: Darragh Maguire; 2006: Trevor Molloy; 2007: Keith Fahey; 2008: Keith Fahey; 2009: Ryan Guy; 2010: Conor Kenna; 2011: Evan McMillan	2012: Ian Bermingham; 2013: Greg Bolger; 2014: Christy Fagan; 2015: James Chambers; 2016: Ian Bermingham; 2017: Conan Byrne; 2018: Lee Desmond; 2019: Brendan Clarke	2020: Brendan Clarke; 2021: Vítězslav Jaroš; 2022: Joe Redmond; 2023: Dean Lyness; 2024: Jake Mulraney; 2025: Chris Forrester; 2026: Joseph Anang

=== League of Ireland Top Scorer ===
Season	Player	Goals
1951–52	(Republic of Ireland) Shay Gibbons	26
1952–53	(Republic of Ireland) Shay Gibbons	22
1955–56	(Republic of Ireland) Shay Gibbons	21
1989–90	(Republic of Ireland) Mark Ennis	19
1998–99	(Republic of Ireland) Trevor Molloy	15
2008	(Republic of Ireland) Mark Quigley	15
2014	(Republic of Ireland) Christy Fagan	20

== Records ==
- St. Pats Full League Record

P 2206 W 926 D 570 L 709 F 3303 A 2797 Pts 2943

Statistics are correct up to 31/10/2026
Above points tally is the number of points earned in real terms. In most seasons the league used a 'two points for a win', system.
If using a straight 'three points for a win, one for a draw', system, St Pats would have earned 3350 points.

- Record League Points Tally 73 in season 1998–99 (33 games)
- Record League Goals Tally 66 in season 2014 (33 games)
- Record League Victory 8–0 (h) v Limerick (10 December 1967)
- Record League Game Winning Streak 9 games in seasons 2015 & 2024
- Record FAI Cup Victory 8–0 (h) v Pike Rovers (21 May 2016) &
  8–0 (h) v UCC (20 July 2025)
- Record League Cup Victory 5–1 v Athlone Town (13 October 1985)
- Record Leinster Senior Cup Victory 7–0 (h) v Tolka Rovers (9 February 2015)
- Record Goalscorer Shay Gibbons – 172 goals
- Record League Goalscorer Shay Gibbons – 108 goals
- Record League Goalscorer in one season Shay Gibbons – 28 goals in 1954–55
- Record Goal scorer in Europe Christy Fagan – 6 goals
- Record Goal scorer in Europe in one season Declan O'Brien – 4 goals in 2009
- Record Total Appearances Chris Forrester – 455 appearances
- Record League Appearances Chris Forrester – 356 appearances
- Record FAI Cup Appearances Ian Bermingham – 39 appearances
- Record European Appearances Chris Forrester – 29 appearances
- Youngest Player Kimson Kibaga – 15 years 104 days (28 March 2026 vs Montpelier in the Leinster Senior Cup)
- Youngest League Player Mason Melia – 15 years 232 days (12 May 2023 vs Drogheda United in the League of Ireland Premier Division)
- Youngest Goalscorer Mason Melia – 15 years 132 days (31 January 2023 vs Wexford in the Leinster Senior Cup)
- Youngest League Goalscorer Mason Melia – 15 years 281 days (30 June 2023 vs UCD)

=== Top scorers ===
Top goal-scorers in all competitions from the club's League of Ireland era onwards.

Rank	Player	Goals
1	Shay Gibbons	172
2	Paddy Ginger O'Rourke	152
3	Ronnie Whelan Snr.	142
4	Mark Ennis	101
5	Chris Forrester	97
6	Christy Fagan	93

=== League of Ireland Placing History ===
1950s

- 1951–52: League of Ireland 1st of 12 C
- 1952–53: League of Ireland 4th of 12
- 1953–54: League of Ireland 11th of 12
- 1954–55: League of Ireland 1st of 12 C
- 1955–56: League of Ireland 1st of 12 C
- 1956–57: League of Ireland 9th of 12
- 1957–58: League of Ireland 4th of 12
- 1958–59: League of Ireland 8th of 12
- 1959–60: League of Ireland 7th of 12

1960s

- 1960–61: League of Ireland 2nd of 12
- 1961–62: League of Ireland 4th of 12
- 1962–63: League of Ireland 9th of 10
- 1963–64: League of Ireland 5th of 12
- 1964–65: League of Ireland 7th of 12
- 1965–66: League of Ireland 9th of 12
- 1966–67: League of Ireland 6th of 12
- 1967–68: League of Ireland 9th of 12
- 1968–69: League of Ireland 5th of 12
- 1969–70: League of Ireland 13th of 14

1970s

- 1970–71: League of Ireland 12th of 14
- 1971–72: League of Ireland 6th of 14
- 1972–73: League of Ireland 7th of 14
- 1973–74: League of Ireland 8th of 14
- 1974–75: League of Ireland 10th of 14
- 1975–76: League of Ireland 11th of 14
- 1976–77: League of Ireland 6th of 14
- 1977–78: League of Ireland 10th of 16
- 1978–79: League of Ireland 14th of 16
- 1979–80: League of Ireland 12th of 16

1980s

- 1980–81: League of Ireland 8th of 16
- 1981–82: League of Ireland 7th of 16
- 1982–83: League of Ireland 7th of 14
- 1983–84: League of Ireland 10th of 14
- 1984–85: League of Ireland 11th of 16
- 1985–86: LOI Premier Division 6th of 12
- 1986–87: LOI Premier Division 5th of 12
- 1987–88: LOI Premier Division 2nd of 12
- 1988–89: LOI Premier Division 4th of 12
- 1989–90: LOI Premier Division 1st of 12 C

1990s

- 1990–91: LOI Premier Division 3rd of 12
- 1991–92: LOI Premier Division 7th of 12
- 1992–93: LOI Premier Division 7th of 12
- 1993–94: LOI Premier Division 9th of 12
- 1994–95: LOI Premier Division 5th of 12
- 1995–96: LOI Premier Division 1st of 12 C
- 1996–97: LOI Premier Division 5th of 12
- 1997–98: LOI Premier Division 1st of 12 C
- 1998–99: LOI Premier Division 1st of 12 C
- 1999–2000: LOI Premier Division 6th of 12

2000s

- 2000–01: LOI Premier Division 5th of 12
- 2001–02: LOI Premier Division 1st of 12 C
- 2002–03: LOI Premier Division 7th of 10
- 2003: LOI Premier Division 5th of 10
- 2004: LOI Premier Division 8th of 10
- 2005: LOI Premier Division 10th of 12
- 2006: LOI Premier Division 7th of 12
- 2007: LOI Premier Division 2nd of 12
- 2008: LOI Premier Division 2nd of 12
- 2009: LOI Premier Division 7th of 10

2010s

- 2010: LOI Premier Division 5th of 10
- 2011: LOI Premier Division 4th of 10
- 2012: LOI Premier Division 3rd of 12
- 2013: LOI Premier Division 1st of 12 C
- 2014: LOI Premier Division 3rd of 12
- 2015: LOI Premier Division 4th of 12
- 2016: LOI Premier Division 7th of 12
- 2017: LOI Premier Division 8th of 12
- 2018: LOI Premier Division 5th of 10
- 2019: LOI Premier Division 7th of 10

2020s

- 2020: LOI Premier Division 6th of 10
- 2021: LOI Premier Division 2nd of 10
- 2022: LOI Premier Division 4th of 10
- 2023: LOI Premier Division 3rd of 10
- 2024: LOI Premier Division 3rd of 10
- 2025: LOI Premier Division 5th of 10
- 2026: LOI Premier Division 3rd of 10

== European record ==
=== Overview ===
As of match played on 14 August 2025

Competition	P	W	D	L	GF	GA
European Cup / UEFA Champions League	8	0	3	5	2	23
Inter-Cities Fairs Cup / UEFA Cup / UEFA Europa League	42	10	7	25	39	70
UEFA Europa Conference League / UEFA Conference League	18	7	5	6	21	22
European Cup Winners' Cup	2	0	0	2	1	8
UEFA Intertoto Cup	4	2	0	2	6	6
TOTAL	74	19	15	40	69	129

=== Matches ===
Season	Competition	Round	Opponent	Home	Away	Aggregate
1961–62	European Cup Winners' Cup	PR	(Scotland) Dunfermline Athletic	0–4 (Note: Played at Tolka Park)	1–4	1–8
1967–68	Inter Cities Fairs Cup	1R	(France) Bordeaux	1–3 (Note: Played at Dalymount Park)	3–6	4–9
1988–89	UEFA Cup	1R	(Scotland) Hearts	0–2	0–2	0–4
1990–91	European Cup	1R	(Romania) Dinamo București	1–1	0–4	1–5
1996–97	UEFA Cup	PR	(Slovakia) Slovan Bratislava	3–4	0–1	3–5
1998–99	UEFA Champions League	1Q	(Scotland) Celtic	0–2	0–0	0–2
1999–00	UEFA Champions League	1Q	(Moldova) Zimbru	0–5	0–5	0–10
2002	UEFA Intertoto Cup	1R	(Croatia) Rijeka	1–0	2–3	3–3 (a)
2002	UEFA Intertoto Cup	2R	(Belgium) Gent	3–1	0–2	3–3 (a)
2007–08	UEFA Cup	1QR	(Denmark) Odense	0–0	0–5	0–5
2008–09	UEFA Cup	1QR	(Latvia) JFK Olimps	2–0	1–0	3–0
2008–09	UEFA Cup	2QR	(Sweden) Elfsborg	2–1	2–2	4–3
2008–09	UEFA Cup	1R	(Germany) Hertha BSC	0–0 (Note: Played at RDS Arena)	0–2	0–2
2009–10	UEFA Europa League	2QR	(Malta) Valletta	1–1	1–0	2–1
2009–10	UEFA Europa League	3QR	(Russia) Krylia Sovetov	1–0	2–3	3–3 (a)
2009–10	UEFA Europa League	PO	(Romania) Steaua București	1–2	0–3	1–5
2011–12	UEFA Europa League	1QR	(Iceland) ÍBV	2–0	0–1	2–1
2011–12	UEFA Europa League	2QR	(Kazakhstan) Shakhter Karagandy	2–0	1–2	3–2
2011–12	UEFA Europa League	3QR	(Ukraine) Karpaty Lviv	1–3 (Note: Played at Tallaght Stadium)	0–2	1–5
2012–13	UEFA Europa League	1QR	(Iceland) ÍBV	1–0	1–2 (a.e.t.)	2–2 (a)
2012–13	UEFA Europa League	2QR	(Bosnia and Herzegovina) Siroki Brijeg	2–1 (a.e.t.)	1–1	3–2
2012–13	UEFA Europa League	3QR	(Germany) Hannover 96	0–3	0–2	0–5
2013–14	UEFA Europa League	1QR	(Lithuania) Žalgiris	1–2	2–2	3–4
2014–15	UEFA Champions League	2QR	(Poland) Legia Warsaw	0–5	1–1	1–6
2015–16	UEFA Europa League	1QR	(Latvia) Skonto	0–2	1–2	1–4
2016–17	UEFA Europa League	1QR	(Luxembourg) Jeunesse Esch	1–0	1–2	2–2 (a)
2016–17	UEFA Europa League	2QR	(Belarus) Dinamo Minsk	0–1	1–1	1–2
2019–20	UEFA Europa League	1QR	(Sweden) IFK Norrköping	0–2	1–2	1–4
2022–23	UEFA Europa Conference League	2QR	(Slovenia) Mura	1–1	0–0 (a.e.t.)	1–1 (6–5 p)
2022–23	UEFA Europa Conference League	3QR	(Bulgaria) CSKA Sofia	0–2	1–0	1–2
2023–24	UEFA Europa Conference League	1QR	(Luxembourg) F91 Dudelange	2–3	1–2	3–5
2024–25	UEFA Conference League	2QR	(Liechtenstein) Vaduz	3–1	2–2	5–3
2024–25	UEFA Conference League	3QR	(Azerbaijan) Sabah	1–0	1–0	2–0
2024–25	UEFA Conference League	PO	(Turkey) İstanbul Başakşehir	0–0	0–2	0–2
2025–26	UEFA Conference League	1QR	(Lithuania) Hegelmann	1–0	2–0	3–0
2025–26	UEFA Conference League	2QR	(Estonia) Nõmme Kalju	1–0	2–2 (a.e.t.)	3–2
2025–26	UEFA Conference League	3QR	(Turkey) Beşiktaş	1–4	2–3	3–7
2027–28	UEFA Conference League	1QR				

Notes

- (a): (Away goals rule)
- (aet): (After Extra Time)
- 1R: First round
- 2R: Second round
- PR: Preliminary round
- 1Q: First qualifying round
- 2Q: Second qualifying round
- 3Q: Third qualifying round
- PO: Play-off round

=== UEFA Club Ranking ===
As of 22 August 2025

Rank	Team	Points
178	(Czech Republic) Jablonec	7.820
179	(Czech Republic) Sigma Olomouc	7.820
180	(Republic of Ireland) St Patrick's Athletic	7.500
181	(Moldova) Milsami Orhei	7.500
182	(Estonia) Levadia Tallinn	7.500

== Managers ==
- (Republic of Ireland) Selection Committee (1929–54)
- (Republic of Ireland) Alex Stevenson (1954–58)
- (Republic of Ireland) Jimmy Collins (1958–63)
- (Republic of Ireland) Shay Keogh (1963–65)
- (England) George Lax (1965–66)
- (Republic of Ireland) Gerry Doyle (1966–67)
- (Republic of Ireland) Peter Farrell (1967–68)
- (Scotland) John Colrain (1968–71)
- (England) Jack Burkett (1971–75)
- (Republic of Ireland) George Richardson (1975–76)
- (England) Barry Bridges (1976–78)
- (Republic of Ireland) Ralph O'Flaherty (1978–79)
- (Republic of Ireland) Charlie Walker (1979–84)
- (Republic of Ireland) Eoin Hand (1984–85)
- (Republic of Ireland) Jimmy Jackson (1985–86)
- (Republic of Ireland) Brian Kerr (1986–96)
- (Republic of Ireland) Pat Dolan (1996–98)
- (Republic of Ireland) Pete Mahon (interim) (1998)
- (Republic of Ireland) Liam Buckley (1998–99)
- (Republic of Ireland) Pat Dolan (1999–03)
- (Republic of Ireland) Eamonn Collins (2003–04)
- (Republic of Ireland) John McDonnell (1 March 2004 – 10 January 2009)
- (Republic of Ireland) Jeff Kenna (14 January 2009 – 18 September 2009)
- (Republic of Ireland) Maurice O'Driscoll (interim) (18 September 2009 – 22 September 2009)
- (Republic of Ireland) Pete Mahon (interim) (23 September 2009 – 8 December 2009)
- (Republic of Ireland) Pete Mahon (9 December 2009 – 1 December 2011)
- (Republic of Ireland) Liam Buckley (2 December 2011 – 25 September 2018)
- (Republic of Ireland) Ger O'Brien (interim) (25 September 2018 – 26 October 2018)
- (Republic of Ireland) Harry Kenny (24 October 2018 – 24 August 2019)
- (Republic of Ireland) Stephen O'Donnell (31 August 2019 – 2 December 2021)
- (Republic of Ireland) Tim Clancy (2 December 2021 – 2 May 2023)
- (Republic of Ireland) Jon Daly (interim) (2 May 2023 – 22 May 2023)
- (Republic of Ireland) Jon Daly (22 May 2023 – 7 May 2024)
- (Republic of Ireland) Seán O'Connor (interim) (7 May 2024 – 16 May 2024)
- (Republic of Ireland) Stephen Kenny (16 May 2024 – Present)

=== Manager records ===
As of match played 30 October 2026

Manager	Career	P	W	D	L	GF	GA	GD	Win %	Loss %	Notes
Stephen Kenny	2024–	126	64	30	32	205	121	85	50.8%	25.4%	Won 2023–24 Leinster Senior Cup
Seán O'Connor (interim)	2024	1	0	1	0	2	2	0	0%	0%	
Jon Daly	2023–24	49	25	8	16	75	54	21	51%	32.7%	Won 2023 FAI Cup
Tim Clancy	2022–23	56	25	10	21	81	67	14	44.6%	37.5%	
Stephen O'Donnell	2019–21	70	33	17	20	97	72	25	47.1%	28.6%	Won 2018–19 Leinster Senior Cup, 2021 FAI Cup
Harry Kenny	2019	35	14	7	14	31	37	–6	40%	40%	
Ger O'Brien (interim)	2018	5	2	1	2	11	3	8	40%	40%	
Liam Buckley	2012–18	319	160	60	99	511	355	156	50.5%	31.2%	Won 2013 League of Ireland Premier Division, 2014 President of Ireland's Cup, 2013–14 Leinster Senior Cup, 2014 FAI Cup, 2015 League of Ireland Cup, 2016 League of Ireland Cup
Pete Mahon	2009–11	114	54	27	33	175	111	64	47.4%	28.9%	Won 2010–11 Leinster Senior Cup
Maurice O'Driscoll (interim)	2009	2	0	1	1	2	3	−1	0%	50%	
Jeff Kenna	2009	38	13	5	20	29	49	−20	34.2%	52.6%	
John McDonnell	2004–08	211	88	48	75	271	230	41	41.7%	35.5%	
Eamonn Collins	2003–04	48	19	18	11	70	58	12	39.6%	22.9%	Won 2003 League of Ireland Cup
Pat Dolan	1999–03	55	20	17	18	66	63	3	36.4%	32.7%	Won 1999–00 Leinster Senior Cup, 1999 FAI Super Cup, 2001–02 League of Ireland Cup
Liam Buckley	1998–1999	?	?	?	?	?	?	?	0%	0%	Won 1998–99 League of Ireland Premier Division
Pete Mahon (interim)	1998	?	?	?	?	?	?	?	0%	0%	
Pat Dolan	1996–98	?	?	?	?	?	?	?	0%	0%	Won 1996–97 LFA President's Cup, 1997–98 League of Ireland Premier Division
Brian Kerr	1986–96	?	?	?	?	?	?	?	0%	0%	Won 1986–87 Leinster Senior Cup, 1989–90 Leinster Senior Cup, 1989–90 League of Ireland Premier Division, 1990–91 Leinster Senior Cup, 1990–91 LFA President's Cup, 1995–96 League of Ireland Premier Division
Jimmy Jackson	1985–86	?	?	?	?	?	?	?	0%	0%	
Eoin Hand	1984–85	?	?	?	?	?	?	?	0%	0%	
Charlie Walker	1979–84	?	?	?	?	?	?	?	0%	0%	Won 1982–83 Leinster Senior Cup
Ralph O'Flaherty	1978–79	?	?	?	?	?	?	?	0%	0%	
Barry Bridges	1976–78	?	?	?	?	?	?	?	0%	0%	
George Richardson	1975–76	?	?	?	?	?	?	?	0%	0%	Won 1975–76 Dublin City Cup
Jack Burkett	1971–75	?	?	?	?	?	?	?	0%	0%	Won 1971–72 LFA President's Cup
John Colrain	1968–71	?	?	?	?	?	?	?	0%	0%	
Peter Farrell	1967–68	?	?	?	?	?	?	?	0%	0%	
Gerry Doyle	1966–67	?	?	?	?	?	?	?	0%	0%	
George Lax	1965–66	?	?	?	?	?	?	?	0%	0%	
Shay Keogh	1963–65	?	?	?	?	?	?	?	0%	0%	
Jimmy Collins	1958–63	?	?	?	?	?	?	?	0%	0%	Won 1959 FAI Cup, 1961 FAI Cup
Alex Stevenson	1954–58	?	?	?	?	?	?	?	0%	0%	Won 1954–55 League of Ireland, 1955–56 Dublin City Cup, 1955–56 LFA President's Cup, 1955–56 League of Ireland
Selection Committee	1951–54	?	?	?	?	?	?	?	0%	0%	Won 1951–52 League of Ireland, 1952–53 LFA President's Cup, 1953–54 LFA President's Cup, 1953–54 Dublin City Cup
