= Shay Gibbons =

Irish footballer (1929–2006)

Personal information
- Full name: Seamus Gibbons
- Date of birth: 19 May 1929
- Place of birth: Dublin, Ireland
- Date of death: 9 June 2006 (aged 77)
- Position: Forward

Youth career
- Dublin City
- Home Farm
- Bohemians

Senior career*
Years	Team	Apps	(Gls)
1946–1947	Bohemians	2	(0)
1947–1950	Whitehall Rangers		
1950–1957	St Patrick's Athletic	115	(108)
1957–1958	Holyhead Town		
1958	Cork Hibernians	14	(1)
1958–1959	Dundalk	19	(11)

International career
195x–195x	League of Ireland XI	9	
1952–1955	Republic of Ireland	4	(0)
- * Club domestic league appearances and goals

Shay Gibbons (19 May 1929 – 9 June 2006) was an Irish footballer who played as a forward. He played for several League of Ireland clubs in the 1950s, most notably St Patrick's Athletic. He was League of Ireland top scorer on three occasions in 1951–52, 1952–53 and 1955–56.

== Gaelic football ==
Gibbons was born in Dublin. His mother was from County Wicklow and his father came from County Kildare. His father and brothers had played Gaelic football at inter–county level. As a youth Gibbons was also a prominent Gaelic footballer. He captained Parnells in a Dublin Junior Football Championship final and was in the Parnells team that lost to St Vincents in the 1950 Dublin Senior Football Championship final. At 17, he was also selected as a substitute for the Dublin county team's senior panel.

== Association football ==
=== Early years ===
As a schoolboy and youth Gibbons played association football for Dublin City U14s, Home Farm U16s and Bohemians U19. He also had a trial with Hull City. Gibbons initially played as a centre half, however in a youth trial game against a Liverpool FA XI, he switched to centre-forward. Gibbons made his League of Ireland debut with Bohemians as a replacement for Mick O'Flanagan, before joining Whitehall Rangers of the Athletic Union League and helping them win the Leinster Junior Cup.

=== St Patrick's Athletic ===
Gibbons joined St Patrick's Athletic in 1950 when they were still playing in the Leinster Senior League. In 1950–51, he helped St Pat's win the Leinster title and they were subsequently invited to join the League of Ireland. In 1951–52, Gibbons scored 26 goals in 22 games, including four hat-tricks, and finished the season as the League of Ireland top scorer. His goals also helped St Pat's win their first League of Ireland title in their debut season. In 1952–53, he was again league top scorer with 22 goals in 22 games. This included five he scored in a 6–2 win against Cork Athletic. He also had a sixth goal disallowed. This remains the most goals scored by a St Pat's player in a single game. In 1954–55, Gibbons scored 28 goals as St Pat's won the league for the second time. This remains the most goals scored by a St Pat's player in a single season. In 1955–56, he topped the league scoring charts for a third time with 21 goals as St Pat's won a third League of Ireland title in their first five seasons in the league. With 108 goals, he remains St Pat's all-time top league goal scorer as well as their top goalscorer in all competitions with 172.

=== Later career ===
After short spells with Holyhead Town and Cork Hibernians, Gibbons joined Dundalk for the 1958–59 season, scoring twice in his Oriel Park debut against Cork Hibernians in a League of Ireland Shield game. He went on to score seven goals in his first five appearances for Dundalk. Gibbons finished the season with 23 goals in 37 appearances in all competitions.

== International career ==
Gibbons represented the Republic of Ireland at youth, junior, inter-league and senior levels. Between 1952 and 1955, Gibbons made four senior international appearances. He made his senior debut in a 3–0 away defeat in a friendly against Germany on 4 May 1952. He was the only League of Ireland player in the starting eleven. He won his second cap on 28 October 1953 in a 4–0 win at Dalymount Park against Luxembourg in a 1954 World Cup qualifier. He won his third cap on 19 October 1955 in a 4–1 defeat at home to Yugoslavia. This was the match that Archbishop John Charles McQuaid tried to get banned. He won his final cap in a 2–2 draw with Spain on 27 November 1955.

== Honours ==
St Patrick's Athletic

- League of Ireland: 1951–52, 1954–55, 1955–56
- Dublin City Cup: 1953–54, 1955–56
- LFA President's Cup: 1952–53, 1953–54, 1955–56
- Leinster Senior League (6): 1950–51

Individual

- League of Ireland top scorer: 1951–52, 1952–53, 1955–56
