= List of Sligo Rovers F.C. seasons =

This is a list of seasons played by Sligo Rovers Football Club in Irish and European football, from 1934 (year of entry into the League of Ireland) to the most recent completed season. The list details the club's achievements in the League of Ireland

== Seasons ==
| Season | League of Ireland | | | | | | | | | FAI Cup | Top goalscorer(s) | |
| Season | Division^{[A]} | Pos | P | W | D | L | F | A | Pts | FAI Cup | Name | Goals |
|---|---|---|---|---|---|---|---|---|---|---|---|---|
| 1934-35 | | 3rd | 18 | 8 | 4 | 6 | 44 | 30 | 20 | SF | Gerry McDaid | 35 |
| 1935-36 | | 8th | 22 | 9 | 3 | 10 | 48 | 47 | 21 | R2 | Gerry McDaid | 29 |
| 1936-37 | | 1st | 22 | 16 | 2 | 4 | 68 | 30 | 34 | R2 | Harry Litherland | 29 |
| 1937-38 | | 6th | 22 | 7 | 5 | 10 | 55 | 61 | 19 | R1 | Lewis Hughes | 16 |
| 1938-39 | | 2nd | 22 | 10 | 7 | 5 | 50 | 31 | 27 | RU | Mattie Began | 15 |
| 1939-40 | | 3rd | 22 | 12 | 4 | 6 | 60 | 44 | 28 | RU | Joe McAleer | 21 |
| 1948-49 | | 8th | 18 | 4 | 5 | 9 | 31 | 37 | 13 | R1 | George Sergeant | 16 |
| 1949-50 | | 6th | 18 | 7 | 5 | 6 | 28 | 30 | 19 | SF | Sam Waters | 13 |
| 1950-51 | | 2nd | 18 | 11 | 3 | 4 | 39 | 25 | 25 | SF | George Gray/Stephen McDonagh/Frankie Moody | 10 |
| 1951-52 | | 4th | 22 | 13 | 3 | 6 | 49 | 46 | 29 | SF | Johnny Armstrong | 19 |
| 1952-53 | | 5th | 22 | 8 | 7 | 7 | 42 | 37 | 23 | R2 | (Republic of Ireland) Liam Coll | 16 |
| 1953-54 | | 9th | 22 | 8 | 4 | 10 | 33 | 37 | 20 | R1 | Stephen McDonagh | 12 |
| 1954-55 | | 9th | 22 | 6 | 3 | 13 | 39 | 49 | 15 | R1 | Johnny Armstrong | 19 |
| 1955-56 | | 5th | 22 | 11 | 2 | 9 | 47 | 50 | 24 | R1 | Johnny Armstrong | 22 |
| 1956-57 | | 3rd | 22 | 11 | 7 | 4 | 42 | 29 | 29 | R2 | Johnny Armstrong | 14 |
| 1957-58 | | 11th | 22 | 5 | 5 | 12 | 32 | 61 | 15 | R2 | Victor Meldrum | 20 |
| 1958-59 | | 10th | 22 | 6 | 3 | 13 | 34 | 51 | 15 | R1 | Victor Meldrum | 11 |
| 1959-60 | | 10th | 22 | 5 | 3 | 14 | 44 | 67 | 13 | R2 | Dan McCaffrey | 15 |
| 1960-61 | | 12th | 22 | 1 | 4 | 17 | 35 | 97 | 6 | R1 | Damien Bradley | 21 |
| 1961-62 | | 12th | 22 | 1 | 3 | 18 | 31 | 87 | 5 | R1 | | |
| 1963-64 | | 9th | 22 | 6 | 7 | 9 | 30 | 53 | 17* | R1 | Jimmy Burnside | 8 |
| 1964-65 | | 5th | 22 | 10 | 5 | 7 | 41 | 29 | 25 | R1 | Jimmy Burnside | 12 |
| 1965-66 | | 5th | 22 | 8 | 7 | 7 | 26 | 26 | 23 | SF | Paul Dowling | 9 |
| 1966-67 | | 3rd | 22 | 11 | 5 | 6 | 37 | 29 | 27 | R1 | (England) Johnny Brookes | 17 |
| 1967-68 | | 11th | 22 | 6 | 4 | 12 | 24 | 48 | 16 | R1 | Johnny Brookes | 9 |
| 1968-69 | | 8th | 22 | 8 | 4 | 10 | 29 | 32 | 20 | R1 | Mick Hunter | 12 |
| 1969-70 | | 8th | 26 | 11 | 4 | 11 | 37 | 41 | 26 | RU | Gerry Mitchell | 14 |
| 1970-71 | | 11th | 26 | 7 | 7 | 12 | 36 | 58 | 21 | R2 | | |
| 1971-72 | | 14th | 26 | 5 | 4 | 17 | 34 | 71 | 14 | R1 | Gerry Mitchell | 13 |
| 1972-73 | | 10th | 26 | 8 | 2 | 16 | 25 | 51 | 20* | R1 | Gerry Mitchell | 8 |
| 1973-74 | | 13th | 26 | 6 | 2 | 18 | 28 | 51 | 14 | R2 | Joe Logan/Tony Fagan/Gerry Rogers | 6 |
| 1974-75 | | 14th | 26 | 7 | 4 | 15 | 27 | 46 | 18 | R1 | Liam McCool | 10 |
| 1975-76 | | 10th | 26 | 6 | 8 | 12 | 32 | 49 | 20 | SF | Mick Leonard | 21 |
| 1976-77 | | 1st | 26 | 18 | 3 | 5 | 48 | 20 | 39 | R1 | (Republic of Ireland) Paul McGee | 17 |
| 1977-78 | | 6th | 30 | 13 | 8 | 9 | 47 | 31 | 34 | RU | Gary Hulmes | 15 |
| 1978-79 | | 10th | 30 | 9 | 7 | 14 | 35 | 40 | 25 | R1 | Gary Hulmes | 15 |
| 1979-80 | | 8th | 30 | 11 | 9 | 10 | 40 | 45 | 31 | R2 | Brendan Bradley | 11 |
| 1980-81 | | 11th | 30 | 10 | 6 | 14 | 45 | 47 | 26 | RU | Brendan Bradley | 21 |
| 1981-82 ^{[B]} | | 5th | 30 | 16 | 5 | 9 | 55 | 45 | 62 | R1 | Brendan Bradley | 19 |
| 1982-83 ^{[C]} | | 12th | 26 | 4 | 9 | 13 | 27 | 48 | 21 | W | Gus Gilligan | 6 |
| 1983-84 | | 14th | 26 | 2 | 4 | 20 | 20 | 58 | 8 | R1 | (Republic of Ireland) Paul McGee | 6 |
| 1984-85 | | 13th | 30 | 7 | 12 | 11 | 34 | 47 | 26 | R1 | (Republic of Ireland) Harry McLoughlin | 8 |
| 1985-86 | First | 2nd | 18 | 11 | 5 | 2 | 32 | 13 | 27 | R1 | (Republic of Ireland) Harry McLoughlin | 16 |
| 1986-87 | Premier | 9th | 22 | 6 | 5 | 11 | 23 | 38 | 17 | SF | (Republic of Ireland) Tony O'Kelly | 10 |
| 1987-88 | Premier | 12th | 33 | 4 | 5 | 24 | 30 | 81 | 13 | R1 | (Republic of Ireland) Tony O'Kelly | 7 |
| 1988-89 | First | 10th | 27 | 4 | 6 | 17 | 23 | 37 | 14 | R1 | | |
| 1989-90 | First | 2nd | 27 | 13 | 11 | 3 | 30 | 12 | 37 | R2 | | |
| 1990-91 | Premier | 5th | 33 | 13 | 12 | 8 | 34 | 22 | 38 | R2 | | |
| 1991-92 | Premier | 9th | 33 | 7 | 11 | 15 | 33 | 42 | 26 | R1 | | |
| 1992-93 ^{[D]} | Premier | 11th | 32 | 6 | 14 | 12 | 16 | 32 | 26 | QF | (Republic of Ireland) Padraig Moran | 5 |
| 1993-94 | First | 1st | 27 | 14 | 8 | 5 | 42 | 19 | 50 | W | (Scotland) Eddie Annand | 17 |
| 1994-95 | Premier | 8th | 33 | 12 | 7 | 14 | 43 | 42 | 43 | SF | (Scotland) Eddie Annand | 17 |
| 1995-96 | Premier | 3rd | 33 | 16 | 7 | 10 | 45 | 38 | 55 | SF | | |
| 1996-97 | Premier | 6th | 33 | 12 | 11 | 10 | 43 | 43 | 47 | R2 | | |
| 1997-98 | Premier | 7th | 33 | 10 | 14 | 9 | 46 | 49 | 44 | QF | | |
| 1998-99 | Premier | 9th | 33 | 9 | 11 | 13 | 37 | 50 | 38 | QF | | |
| 1999-00 | Premier | 11th | 33 | 5 | 10 | 18 | 31 | 60 | 25 | R2 | (Republic of Ireland) Padraig Moran | 11 |
| 2000-01 | First | 4th | 36 | 19 | 5 | 12 | 61 | 48 | 62 | R2 | (Republic of Ireland) Padraig Moran | 16 |
| 2001-02 | First | 6th | 32 | 8 | 9 | 15 | 35 | 48 | 33 | QF | (Republic of Ireland) Sean Flannery | 10 |
| 2002-03 | First | 6th | 22 | 8 | 6 | 8 | 28 | 27 | 30 | R3 | (Republic of Ireland) Paul McTiernan | 13 |
| 2003 | First | 6th | 33 | 11 | 13 | 9 | 39 | 39 | 46 | QF | (Republic of Ireland) Paul McTiernan | 11 |
| 2004 | First | 7th | 33 | 11 | 5 | 17 | 46 | 50 | 38 | R2 | (Republic of Ireland) Stephen O'Donnell | 10 |
| 2005 | First | 1st | 33 | 15 | 16 | 5 | 45 | 27 | 61 | QF | (Republic of Ireland) Paul McTiernan | 14 |
| 2006 | Premier | 5th | 30 | 11 | 7 | 12 | 33 | 42 | 40 | SF | (England) Darren Mansaram / (Republic of Ireland) Paul McTiernan | 8 |
| 2007 | Premier | 6th | 33 | 12 | 5 | 16 | 34 | 45 | 41 | R3 | (Bosnia and Herzegovina) Fahrudin Kuduzović | 11 |
| 2008 | Premier | 4th | 33 | 12 | 12 | 9 | 41 | 28 | 48 | R2 | (Benin) Romauld Boco | 7 |
| 2009 | Premier | 6th | 36 | 11 | 10 | 15 | 41 | 51 | 43 | RU | (Republic of Ireland) Raffaele Cretaro | 21 |
| 2010 | Premier | 3rd | 36 | 17 | 12 | 7 | 61 | 36 | 63 | W | (Republic of Ireland) Pádraig Amond | 23 |
| 2011 | Premier | 2nd | 36 | 22 | 7 | 7 | 73 | 19 | 73 | W | (Republic of Ireland) Eoin Doyle | 25 |
| 2012 | Premier | 1st | 30 | 17 | 10 | 3 | 53 | 23 | 61 | R2 | (England) Danny North | 17 |
| 2013 | Premier | 3rd | 33 | 19 | 9 | 5 | 53 | 22 | 66 | W | (Republic of Ireland) David McMillan | 13 |
| 2014 | Premier | 5th | 33 | 12 | 7 | 14 | 44 | 36 | 43 | R2 | (England) Danny North | 7 |
| 2015 | Premier | 9th | 33 | 7 | 10 | 16 | 39 | 55 | 31 | QF | (Republic of Ireland) Raffaele Cretaro | 12 |
| 2016 | Premier | 5th | 33 | 13 | 10 | 10 | 42 | 35 | 49 | R3 | (Republic of Ireland) Raffaele Cretaro | 10 |
| 2017 | Premier | 9th | 33 | 8 | 15 | 10 | 33 | 44 | 39 | R1 | (Republic of Ireland) Kieran Sadlier | 7 |
| 2018 | Premier | 7th | 36 | 12 | 6 | 18 | 38 | 50 | 42 | R1 | (Republic of Ireland) David Cawley / (Republic of Ireland) Mikey Drennan | 6 |
| 2019 | Premier | 7th | 36 | 10 | 12 | 14 | 38 | 47 | 42 | SF | (Jamaica) Romeo Parkes | 11 |
| 2020 | Premier | 4th | 18 | 8 | 1 | 9 | 19 | 23 | 25 | SF | (Republic of Ireland) Ronan Coughlan | 7 |
| 2021 | Premier | 3rd | 36 | 16 | 9 | 11 | 43 | 32 | 57 | R1 | (Republic of Ireland) Johnny Kenny | 11 |
| 2022 | Premier | 5th | 36 | 13 | 10 | 13 | 47 | 44 | 49 | R1 | (Republic of Ireland) Aidan Keena | 18 |
| 2023 | Premier | 8th | 36 | 10 | 7 | 19 | 36 | 51 | 37 | R1 | (New Zealand) Max Mata | 11 |
| 2024 | Premier | 6th | 36 | 13 | 10 | 13 | 40 | 51 | 49 | R3 | (England) Ellis Chapman | 9 |
| 2025 | Premier | 7th | 36 | 11 | 8 | 17 | 42 | 54 | 41 | QF | (Republic of Ireland) Owen Elding | 12 |
| 2026 | Premier | 10th | 36 | 5 | 10 | 21 | 28 | 66 | 25 | QF | (Republic of Ireland) Cian Kavanagh | 8 |
| 2027 | First | | | | | | | | | | | |

== Key ==
| Champions | Runners-up | Promoted | Relegated |

Key to league record:

- P = Played
- W = Games won
- D = Games drawn
- L = Games lost
- F = Goals for
- A = Goals against
- Pts = Points
- Pos = Final position

Key to divisions:

- Premier = LOI Premier Division
- First = LOI First Division

== Notes ==
A. Prior to 1985 there was just one division. Six new teams were introduced for the 1985-86 season and the league was split into two divisions.

B. An experimental points system was operated for the 1981-82 season whereby a team was awarded four points for an away win, three points for a home win, two points for an away draw and one point for a home draw.

C. ^{a} ^{b} In 1982-83 three points were awarded for a win and one point for a draw. The system reverted the following season to the pre-1981-82 system, i.e. two points for a win and one point for a draw.

D. In 1992-93 the Premier Division 'split' into two sections of six after the 22nd series of games had been played on 17 January.
