= LFA President's Cup =

- Organiser(s): Leinster Football Association
- Founded: 1930
- Region: Leinster
- Most championships: Shamrock Rovers (21)

The LFA President's Cup was an association football cup competition featuring League of Ireland clubs affiliated to the Leinster Football Association. It was played for between 1930 and 2002. It was a de facto national super cup and on twenty four occasions featured the League of Ireland champions against the FAI Cup winners. The Football Association of Ireland also organised similar competitions, such as the Top Four Cup and the FAI Super Cup, both of which co-existed with the LFA President's Cup. Since 2014 the FAI has organised their own similarly named super cup, the President's Cup.

== History ==
=== Early years ===
The LFA President's Cup was originally introduced as fundraiser to help cover the costs of the LFA's new headquarters at Parnell Square. The top four placed LFA affiliated clubs from the 1929–30 League of Ireland season took part in two semi-finals. Shelbourne defeated Brideville 1–0 at Harold's Cross Stadium in the first game on Sunday, 4 May 1930. Three days later the 1929–30 FAI Cup winners Shamrock Rovers defeated the league champions, Bohemians 2–0 at Dalymount Park. In the inaugural final on 23 May, Rovers and Shelbourne drew 1–1 at Shelbourne Park. For some reason the final was never replayed. In the 1930–31 final Dundalk beat Rovers 7–3. This became the competitions highest scoring final. Rovers won the cup for the first time outright in 1932–33. They would go on to become the competition's most successful club, winning it twenty-one times. They were also runners-up on a further ten occasions. The 1941–42 competition took nearly an entire year to compete despite a single tie format been used. Shamrock Rovers and Drumcondra drew in August 1941, drew in the replay in April 1942 before Rovers, in Bob Fullam's first competitive match in charge, won the second replay in August 1942.

=== Format ===
The most common format used throughout LFA President's Cup history saw the top placed LFA affiliated club from the League of Ireland play-off against the LFA affiliated club that had progressed the furthest in the FAI Cup. This match was usually a one-off fixture played before the following season. However the earliest competitions in 1930s featured as many as ten clubs and were played at the end of the season. There was no competition held between 1933 and 1938 and when it returned in 1939–40 it adopted the two club single match format. This format continued throughout the 1940s, 1950s and early 1960s. Between 1964 and 1965 and 1972–73, with the exception a single tie final in 1968–69, it reverted to a knockout tournament featuring up to eight clubs. In 1973–74 the LFA broke with tradition when they arranged an all-Munster final for the first and only time. Waterford, who had been League of Ireland champions for six out of the eight previous seasons, played Cork Hibernians, the winners of the two previous FAI Cup finals. Alfie Hale scored both goals, including one penalty, as Waterford won 2–0 at Flower Lodge on 29 August 1973. From 1973 to 1974 onwards the LFA President's Cup continued with the two club single match format, except between 1980 and 1981 and 1983–84 when the finals were played over two legs.

=== Super Cup ===
When the LFA President's Cup was first established in 1929–30 every previous League of Ireland winner had come from Leinster and only two teams from outside Leinster – Alton United and Fordsons – had won the FAI Cup. This Leinster dominance would continue and the League of Ireland's traditional top four clubs – Shamrock Rovers, Shelbourne, Bohemians and Dundalk – all came from the province. As a result the LFA President's Cup developed into a de facto national super cup. On twenty four occasions the final featured the League of Ireland champions against the FAI Cup winners. Between 1954 and 1955 and 1959–60 they met in six consecutive finals. Of the 64 finals played only nine did not feature either the League of Ireland champion or the FAI Cup winner.

== List of finals ==
League of Ireland champions v FAI Cup winners. League champions in bold
More than two teams competed in the cup

| Date | Winner | Score | Runners-up | Venue |
|---|---|---|---|---|
| 1929–30 | Shamrock Rovers | 1–1 (Note: Final not replayed.) | Shelbourne | Shelbourne Park |
| 1930–31 | Dundalk | 1–1 (Note: Shelbourne were the League of Ireland champions but did not take part) | Shamrock Rovers | Shelbourne Park |
| Replay | Dundalk | 7–3 | Shamrock Rovers | Dalymount Park |
| 1931–32 | This competition was not completed | (Note: Ten teams were supposed to participate in 1931–32 but the competition was abandoned after only three games played.) | | |
| 1932–33 | Shamrock Rovers | 2–0 (Note: Eight teams competed in 1932–33 tournament. By coincidence the League of Ireland champions and the FAI Cup winners both reached final.) | **Dundalk** | Dalymount Park |
| 1939–40 | Shelbourne | 2–1 | **Shamrock Rovers** | Shelbourne Park |
| 1940–41 | Shamrock Rovers | 2–1 | **St James's Gate** | Shelbourne Park |
| 1941–42 | Shamrock Rovers | 3–3 | Drumcondra | Tolka Park |
| Replay | Shamrock Rovers | 4–4 | Drumcondra | Dalymount Park |
| 2nd Replay | Shamrock Rovers | 5–3 | Drumcondra | Glenmalure Park |
| 1942–43 | No competition | | | |
| 1943–44 | Shamrock Rovers | 3–2 | Dundalk | Glenmalure Park |
| 1944–45 | Shamrock Rovers | 2–0 (Note: Shelbourne were the League of Ireland champions but did not take part) | Drumcondra | Glenmalure Park |
| 1945–46 | Shamrock Rovers | 3–2 | Shelbourne | Glenmalure Park |
| 1946–47 | Drumcondra | 2–2 | Shamrock Rovers | Dalymount Park |
| Replay | Drumcondra | 1–0 | Shamrock Rovers | Dalymount Park |
| 1947–48 | Drumcondra | 2–2 (Note: Final not replayed.) | Shelbourne | Tolka Park |
| 1948–49 | **Shamrock Rovers** | 3–2 | Drumcondra | Glenmalure Park |
| 1949–50 | Drumcondra | 2–1 | Dundalk | Tolka Park |
| 1950–51 | Drumcondra | 2–0 | Transport | Tolka Park |
| 1951–52 | Dundalk | 2–1 | Drumcondra | Tolka Park |
| 1952–53 | **St Patrick's Athletic** | 1–1 | Dundalk | Tolka Park |
| Replay | **St Patrick's Athletic** | 5–0 | Dundalk | Dalymount Park |
| 1953–54 | St Patrick's Athletic | 2–2 | Shelbourne | Tolka Park |
| Replay | St Patrick's Athletic | 3–1 | Shelbourne | Tolka Park |
| 1954–55 | **Shamrock Rovers** | 2–1 | Drumcondra | Tolka Park |
| 1955–56 | **St Patrick's Athletic** | 3–1 | Shamrock Rovers | Tolka Park |
| 1956–57 | Shamrock Rovers | 1–0 | **St Patrick's Athletic** | Dalymount Park |
| 1957–58 | **Shamrock Rovers** | 3–3 | Drumcondra | Dalymount Park |
| Replay | **Shamrock Rovers** | 1–0 | Drumcondra | Dalymount Park |
| 1958–59 | **Drumcondra** | 4–3 | Dundalk | Dalymount Park |
| 1959–60 | **Shamrock Rovers** | 1–1 | St Patrick's Athletic | Dalymount Park |
| Replay | **Shamrock Rovers** | 2–0 | St Patrick's Athletic | Tolka Park |
| 1960–61 | Shelbourne | 1–1 | Shamrock Rovers | Dalymount Park |
| Replay | Shelbourne | 1–1 | Shamrock Rovers | Tolka Park |
| 2nd Replay | Shelbourne | 3–1 | Shamrock Rovers | Tolka Park |
| 1961–62 | **Drumcondra** | 3–0 | St Patrick's Athletic | Dalymount Park |
| 1962–63 | Shamrock Rovers | 1–0 | Shelbourne | Dalymount Park |
| 1963–64 | **Dundalk** | 4–3 | Shelbourne | Dalymount Park |
| 1964–65 | Dundalk | 1–1 | Shamrock Rovers | Dalymount Park |
| Replay | Dundalk | 4–2 | Shamrock Rovers | Dalymount Park |
| 1965–66 | Bohemians | 1–1 | Shamrock Rovers | Dalymount Park |
| Replay | Bohemians | 3–2 | Shamrock Rovers | Dalymount Park |
| 1966–67 | Drumcondra | 1–0 | Shamrock Rovers | Tolka Park |
| 1967–68 | Bohemians | 0–0 (Note: Four teams played in the competition. However Dundalk, the 1966–67 League of Ireland champions and Shamrock Rovers, the 1966–67 FAI Cup winners did not participate.) | Drumcondra | Dalymount Park |
| Replay | Bohemians | 3–2 | Drumcondra | Tolka Park |
| 1968–69 | Shamrock Rovers | 3–2 | Dundalk | Tolka Park |
| 1969–70 | Shamrock Rovers | 4–3 | St Patrick's Athletic | Tolka Park |
| 1970–71 | Shamrock Rovers | 3–3 | Drogheda | Dalymount Park |
| Replay | Shamrock Rovers | 3–1 | Drogheda | Tolka Park |
| 1971–72 | St Patrick's Athletic | 0–0 | Bohemians | Dalymount Park |
| Replay | St Patrick's Athletic | 2–1 | Bohemians | Tolka Park |
| 1972–73 | Shamrock Rovers | 3–1 | Dundalk | Dalymount Park |
| 1973–74 | **Waterford** | 2–0 | Cork Hibernians | Flower Lodge |
| 1974–75 | Bohemians | 4–1 | St Patrick's Athletic | Tolka Park |
| 1975–76 | **Bohemians** | 4–0 | Home Farm | Dalymount Park |
| 1976–77 | Bohemians | 1–1 | **Dundalk** | Dalymount Park |
| Replay | Bohemians | 1–0 | **Dundalk** | Oriel Park |
| 1977–78 | Bohemians | 2–1 | Dundalk | Oriel Park |
| 1978–79 | **Bohemians** | 3–1 | Shamrock Rovers | Glenmalure Park |
| 1979–80 | Dundalk | 2–1 | Bohemians | Oriel Park |
| 1980–81 | Dundalk | 1–1 | St Patrick's Athletic | Richmond Park |
| | Dundalk | 3–0 (Note: Final played over were two legs. Dundalk won 4–1 on aggregate.) | St Patrick's Athletic | Oriel Park |
| 1981–82 | Dundalk | 2–1 | **Athlone Town** | Oriel Park |
| | Dundalk | 2–2 (Note: Final played over were two legs. Dundalk won 4–3 on aggregate.) | **Athlone Town** | St Mel's Park |
| 1982–83 | Bohemians | 1–0 | Dundalk | Dalymount Park |
| | Bohemians | 2–3 (Note: Final played over were two legs. Bohemians won on away goals.) | Dundalk | Oriel Park |
| 1983–84 | Athlone Town | 2–1 | Bohemians | St Mel's Park |
| | Athlone Town | 3–0 (Note: Final played over were two legs. Athlone Town won 5–1 on aggregate.) | Bohemians | Dalymount Park |
| 1984–85 | **Shamrock Rovers** | 3–2 | UCD | Tolka Park |
| 1985–86 | Shamrock Rovers | 1–0 (Note: After extra time.) | Bohemians | Glenmalure Park |
| 1986–87 | Shamrock Rovers | 3–2 | Dundalk | Oriel Park |
| 1987–88 | Shamrock Rovers | 0–0 (Note: No extra time was played because of heavy rain. Shamrock Rovers won 3–1 on penalties.) | Dundalk | Oriel Park |
| 1988–89 | Dundalk | 3–2 | St Patrick's Athletic | Tolka Park |
| 1989–90 | Dundalk | 3–1 | Bray Wanderers | Carlisle Grounds |
| 1990–91 | **St Patrick's Athletic** | 2–2 (Note: After extra-time, St Patrick's Athletic won 5–4 on penalties.) | Bray Wanderers | Carlisle Grounds |
| 1991–92 | (Note: Final not played. The two finalists, Dundalk and Shamrock Rovers, could not agree on a date.) | | | |
| 1992–93 | Bohemians | 0–0 (Note: After extra-time, Bohemians won 4–2 on penalties.) | **Shelbourne** | Tolka Park |
| 1993–94 | Shelbourne | 3–2 (Note: After extra time.) | Bohemians | Tolka Park |
| 1994–95 | Bohemians | 2–1 | Shamrock Rovers | Dalymount Park |
| 1995–96 | Shelbourne | 2–1 | Dundalk | Tolka Park |
| 1996–97 | **St Patrick's Athletic** | 0–0 (Note: No extra-time played, St Patrick's Athletic won 6–5 on penalties.) | Shelbourne | Dalymount Park |
| 1997–98 | Bohemians | 1–0 | Shelbourne | Dalymount Park |
| 1998–99 | Shelbourne | 4–0 | St Patrick's Athletic | Richmond Park |
| 1999–2000 | No competition | | | |
| 2000–01 | Bohemians | 0–0 (Note: Bohemians won 4–1 on penalties.) | Shelbourne | Dalymount Park |
| 2001–02 | Bohemians | 1–1 (Note: Bohemians won 4–3 on penalties.) | Shelbourne | Dalymount Park |
| 2002–03 | **Shelbourne** | 2–0 | Dundalk | Tolka Park |

== List of winners by club ==
| Club | Titles | Seasons |
|---|---|---|
| Shamrock Rovers | 21 | 1929–30, 1932–33, 1940–41, 1941–42, 1943–44, 1944–45, 1945–46, 1948–49, 1954–55, 1956–57, 1957–58, 1959–60, 1962–63, 1968–69, 1969–70, 1970–71, 1972–73, 1984–85, 1985–86, 1986–87, 1987–88 ^{(Note 1)} |
| Bohemians | 13 | 1965–66, 1967–68, 1974–75, 1975–76, 1976–77, 1977–78, 1978–79, 1982–83, 1992–93, 1994–95, 1997–98, 2000–01, 2001–02 |
| Dundalk | 9 | 1930–31, 1951–52, 1963–64, 1964–65, 1979–80, 1980–81, 1981–82, 1988–89, 1989–90 |
| Shelbourne | 8 | 1929–30, 1939–40, 1947–48, 1960–61, 1993–94, 1995–96, 1998–99, 2002–03 ^{(Note 1)} ^{(Note 2)} |
| Drumcondra | 7 | 1946–47, 1947–48, 1949–50, 1950–51, 1958–59, 1961–62, 1966–67 ^{(Note 2)} |
| St Patrick's Athletic | 6 | 1952–53, 1953–54, 1955–56, 1971–72, 1990–91, 1996–97 |
| Athlone Town | 1 | 1983–84 |
| Waterford | 1 | 1973–74 |

Notes

- ^1 Shamrock Rovers and Shelbourne shared the 1929–30 title.
- ^2 Drumcondra and Shelbourne shared the 1947–48 title.

== See also ==
- FAI Super Cup
- President of Ireland's Cup
- Top Four Cup
