= Dessie Glynn =

Irish footballer

Personal information
- Full name: Desmond Glynn
- Date of birth: 7 June 1928
- Place of birth: Dublin, Ireland
- Date of death: 6 January 2017 (aged 88)
- Position: Forward

Youth career
- Johnville
- Clifton United

Senior career*
Years	Team	Apps	(Gls)
1949–1956	Drumcondra	148	(96)
1956–1958	Shelbourne	26	(15)

International career
1951	League of Ireland XI		
1951–55	Republic of Ireland	2	(1)
- * Club domestic league appearances and goals

Desmond "Dessie" Glynn (7 June 1928 – 6 January 2017) was an Irish footballer who played for Drumcondra and Shelbourne in the late 1940s and 1950s, scoring 111 goals in his League of Ireland career. Glynn was also Drumcondra's all-time top goalscorer with 96 goals between 1949 and 1956. Eamon Dunphy described Glynn as "a splendidly versatile centre-forward, a scorer and maker of goals".

Glynn grew up in Drumcondra, Dublin, was educated at St. Vincent's C.B.S. and worked for the Irish civil service. In 1958, he spent nine months in hospital, suffering from tuberculosis – a condition which effectively ended his playing career. He later coached in New York.

== Club career ==
=== Early years ===
As a youth, Glynn played for Johnville and was a member of their team that won the FAI Youth Cup in 1945–46. He subsequently played for Clifton United.

=== Drumcondra ===
Glynn joined Drumcondra in January 1949 and helped the club win the League of Ireland title in his first season. He was an all rounder and appeared in virtually every position for Drumcondra. He also played in two FAI Cup finals, collecting a winners medal in 1953–54 and a runners-up medal in 1954–55. His teammates in these two finals included, among others, Tim Coffey, Bobby Duffy and Benny Henderson. Glynn scored 96 league goals in eight seasons with Drumcondra and was the club's top scorer in six seasons. He was also the top scorer in the 1950–51 League of Ireland season with 20 goals. In November 1951, Glynn scored five goals in a game against Transport. He scored the fifth from a penalty kick, which according to legend, burst the net and knocked out a seventeen year old fan in the crowd.

=== Shelbourne ===
Glynn joined Shelbourne for the 1956–57 season, where he again finished as the club top scorer with 12 league goals. He continued to play for Shelbourne until 1958.

== International career ==
=== League of Ireland XI ===
In October 1951, Glynn was a member of the League of Ireland XI that lost 9–1 to a Football League XI.

=== Republic of Ireland ===
Glynn was capped twice by the Republic of Ireland at senior level. He made his international debut on 17 October 1951 at Dalymount Park in a 3–2 win against West Germany. Together with Florrie Burke, Glynn was one of two League of Ireland players selected for the starting eleven. Glynn scored the winner for the Republic after finishing off a move started by Peter Farrell and Tommy Eglington. Glynn had cancelled his honeymoon in order to make his Republic of Ireland debut. He won his second cap on 25 May 1955 in a 3–1 away win against Norway.

== Honours ==
Drumcondra

- League of Ireland
  - 1948–49
- FAI Cup
  - 1953–54
- League of Ireland Shield
  - 1950–51
- Dublin City Cup
  - 1949–50, 1950–51, 1951–52
- Leinster Senior Cup
  - 1949–50, 1953–54

Johnville

- FAI Youth Cup
  - 1945–46: 1

Individual

- League of Ireland Top Scorer:
  - 1950–51
