= Mick Lawlor (association footballer) =

Irish footballer (born 1949)

Personal information
- Date of birth: 12 April 1949 (age 77)
- Place of birth: Dublin, Republic of Ireland
- Position: Striker

Youth career
- Home Farm

Senior career*
Years	Team	Apps	(Gls)
1965–1974	Shamrock Rovers	120	(41)
1974–1976	Shelbourne	49	(18)
1976–1981	Dundalk	70	(17)
1981–1982	Shelbourne	29	(2)
1982–1983	Bohemians	8	(1)
1983–1984	Limerick United	1	(0)
1984–1986	Home Farm	24	(2)

International career
1970–1973	Republic of Ireland	5	(0)
1972	Republic of Ireland U23	1	(0)
1970	League of Ireland XI	1	(0)

Managerial career
- 1984–86: Home Farm
- 1986: Drogheda United
- * Club domestic league appearances and goals

Mick Lawlor (born 12 April 1949) is an Irish former footballer who played as a forward.

== Playing career ==
Son of Kit Lawlor he joined Shamrock Rovers in 1966 and made a scoring debut on 20 April 1966. He scored his first goal for the Hoops the following season in a Dublin City Cup semi final win over Waterford United.

He twice played in the UEFA Cup Winners' Cup for Rovers against Randers FC and FC Schalke 04. He scored 41 League and 8 FAI Cup goals in the green and white and earned one League of Ireland XI cap.

After all the success at Milltown Mick signed for Shelbourne in January 1974.

He later signed for Dundalk in 1976 and was named Player of the Month in March 1977. He had more success scoring against Celtic at Parkhead in the 1979–80 European Cup. Shortly after he was out of the game for a year with injury and became assistant manager to Jim McLaughlin. At this stage his younger brother Martin was playing for the club. He resigned from the Oriel Park outfit in May 1981 to seek first team football which he got again at Shelbourne.

Then he signed for Bohemians F.C. in 1982 but announced his retirement in January 1983.

Lawlor was appointed player/manager of Home Farm in March 1984.

He then was appointed manager of Drogheda United in 1986 but resigned in November.

He was also Chairman of the PFAI near the end of his career and managed Clontarf Athletic from 1988.

== International career ==
Lawlor won five full international caps for the Republic of Ireland national football team as well as youth caps, making his full international debut at 21 years, 5 months & 11 days against Poland in Dalymount Park, Dublin.

He was appointed Ireland kit manager in April 2008.

== Family connections ==
His two brothers Robbie and Martin also played for Rovers, and his uncle Jimmy Lawlor was also a footballer.

== Honours ==
- League of Ireland
  - Dundalk F.C. – 1978/79
- FAI Cup: 3
  - Shamrock Rovers – 1968, 1969
  - Dundalk F.C. – 1979
- League of Ireland Shield
  - Shamrock Rovers – 1967/68
- Leinster Senior Cup
  - Shamrock Rovers – 1969
- League of Ireland Cup
  - Dundalk F.C. – 1977/78
- Top Four Cup
  - Shamrock Rovers 1966
- Blaxnit Cup
  - Shamrock Rovers 1967–68
- LFA President's Cup:
  - Shamrock Rovers 1969/70

== Sources ==
- Doolan, Paul; Goggins, Robert (1993). The Hoops: A History of Shamrock Rovers. Dublin: Gill & MacMillan. ISBN 978-0-7171-2121-2.
