= 1952–53 League of Ireland =

League of Ireland
- Season: 1952–53
- Champions: Shelbourne (6th title)
- Matches played: 132
- Goals scored: 484 (3.67 per match)
- Top goalscorer: Shay Gibbons (22 goals)
- Biggest home win: Cork Athletic 6–1 Bohemians; Drumcondra 6–1 Bohemians; Shelbourne 6–1 Cork Athletic
- Biggest away win: Bohemians 3–7 St Patrick's Athletic
- Highest scoring: Bohemians 3–7 St Patrick's Athletic

The 1952–53 League of Ireland was the 32nd season of senior football in the Republic of Ireland.

St Patrick's Athletic were the defending champions.

== Changes from 1951–52 ==
No new teams were elected to the League.

== Teams ==
Locations of the 1952–53 League of Ireland teams

Team	Location	Stadium
Bohemians	Dublin (Phibsborough)	Dalymount Park
Cork Athletic	Cork (Mardyke)	Mardyke
Drumcondra	Dublin (Clonturk)	Clonturk Park
Dundalk	Dundalk	Oriel Park
Evergreen United	Cork (Turners Cross)	Turners Cross
Limerick	Limerick	Markets Field
Shamrock Rovers	Dublin (Milltown)	Glenmalure Park
Shelbourne	Dublin (Ringsend)	Shelbourne Park
Sligo Rovers	Sligo	The Showgrounds
St Patrick's Athletic	Dublin (Inchicore)	Richmond Park
Transport	Bray	Carlisle Grounds
Waterford	Waterford	Kilcohan Park

== Season overview ==
Shelbourne won their sixth title.

== Table ==
Pos	Team	Pld	W	D	L	GF	GA	GD	Pts
1	Shelbourne	22	12	6	4	46	24	+22	30
2	Drumcondra	22	10	9	3	49	33	+16	29
3	Shamrock Rovers	22	12	3	7	40	27	+13	27
4	St Patrick's Athletic	22	8	8	6	49	34	+15	24
5	Sligo Rovers	22	8	7	7	42	37	+5	23
6	Dundalk	22	8	6	8	45	45	0	22
7	Limerick	22	8	5	9	39	44	−5	21
8	Cork Athletic	22	9	3	10	41	47	−6	21
9	Transport	22	7	7	8	35	42	−7	21
10	Evergreen United	22	8	4	10	36	35	+1	20
11	Waterford	22	5	5	12	35	58	−23	15
12	Bohemians	22	4	3	15	27	58	−31	11

Source: RSSSF, foot.dk

== Results ==
Home \ Away	BOH	CAT	DRU	DUN	EVE	LIM	SHM	SHE	SLI	STP	TRA	WAT
Bohemians	—	1–2	1–3	0–4	1–1	2–0	2–1	0–3	2–0	3–7	4–2	0–0
Cork Athletic	6–1	—	3–3	2–0	2–1	2–2	0–1	2–0	1–4	2–1	1–2	4–2
Drumcondra	6–1	1–1	—	2–1	0–1	3–0	1–0	1–1	3–1	0–0	1–1	4–4
Dundalk	5–1	1–0	2–2	—	3–2	2–1	0–0	2–2	0–4	1–1	5–2	4–0
Evergreen United	2–1	1–0	3–1	5–0	—	2–2	0–3	1–2	1–1	1–3	1–2	4–2
Limerick	4–3	1–4	1–1	6–3	2–0	—	4–1	2–4	2–0	2–2	1–1	2–1
Shamrock Rovers	1–0	6–2	4–3	2–2	2–1	1–2	—	2–0	2–0	2–0	3–0	1–2
Shelbourne	2–1	6–1	2–3	2–0	3–1	3–0	1–2	—	4–1	1–0	1–1	4–0
Sligo Rovers	4–1	1–2	2–2	2–2	1–1	2–1	0–2	2–2	—	1–1	3–1	4–3
St Patrick's Athletic	2–0	6–2	1–2	4–2	2–3	3–0	3–1	1–1	3–3	—	1–2	4–1
Transport	1–1	2–0	2–4	2–1	1–0	2–3	1–1	1–2	0–4	3–3	—	5–1
Waterford	2–1	4–2	1–3	3–5	1–4	2–1	3–2	0–0	1–2	1–1	1–1	—

Source: extratime.ie
Legend: Blue = home team win; Yellow = draw; Red = away team win.

== Top scorers ==
Rank	Player	Club	Goals
1	(Republic of Ireland) Shay Gibbons	St Patrick's Athletic	22
2	(Republic of Ireland) Jim Rowe	Drumcondra	16
3	(Republic of Ireland) Liam Coll	Sligo Rovers	13
3	(Republic of Ireland) Rory Dwyer	Shelbourne	13
3	(Republic of Ireland) Dessie Glynn	Drumcondra	13
3	(Republic of Ireland) Mick Lipper	Transport	13
7	(Republic of Ireland) Seán McCarthy	Evergreen United	11
7	(Republic of Ireland) Joe Martin	Dundalk	11
9	(Republic of Ireland) Paddy Collopy	Limerick	10
9	(New Zealand) Tom McCabe	Dundalk	10
