= Jackie Mooney =

Irish footballer

Personal information
- Date of birth: 1938
- Place of birth: Dublin, Ireland
- Date of death: 30 December 2017 (aged 79)
- Place of death: Dublin, Ireland
- Position: Inside right

Senior career*
Years	Team	Apps	(Gls)
1954–1955	Home Farm		
1955–1958	Manchester United	0	(0)
1958–1960	Bangor City		
1960–1962	Cork Hibernians	41	(16)
1962–1967	Shamrock Rovers	55	(38)
1967–1969	Aer Lingus		
1969–1971	Athlone Town	40	(12)
1971–1972	Bohemians	23	(11)
1972–1975	Shamrock Rovers	2	(0)
1975–1977	Athlone Town	25	(1)

International career
1962–1965	League of Ireland XI	6	(1)
1964	Republic of Ireland	2	(1)
- * Club domestic league appearances and goals

Jackie Mooney (1938 – 30 December 2017) was an Irish soccer player during the 1960s and 1970s.

Mooney played for Shamrock Rovers, Athlone Town and Bohemians amongst others during his career in the League of Ireland.

== Club career ==
Jackie was spotted playing for Home Farm by Billy Behan in 1955 and joined Manchester United. After 3 years at the club however, Mooney left Old Trafford without making the breakthrough. He had short spells at Bangor City and Cork Hibernians before signing for Shamrock Rovers where he made a scoring debut, against Shels in Dalymount Park on 22 August 1962. He scored for Rovers in the Inter-Cities Fairs Cup against Valencia in the Estadio Mestalla in 1963. He made a total of 6 appearances for the Hoops in European competition and was also the league top scorer in 1964/65 season with 16 goals

After sustaining a serious knee injury in a match against Shelbourne, Mooney was out of the game for two years. He returned to play for Aer Lingus in the Leinster Senior League for two years before Billy Young brought him back into football with Athlone Town when they re entered the league for the 1969–70 League of Ireland season. He had immediate success as Athlone won the Leinster Senior Cup for the first time with Mooney scoring a hat trick in the final. After a couple of seasons at Athlone, Mooney followed Young to Dalymount Park and Bohemians. He was top scorer for Bohs during the 1971/72 season. His goalscoring record for that season showed a total of 10 goals in 23 league games.

== International career ==
He also represented the full Irish international team during the 1960s; marking his debut with a goal against Poland at Dalymount Park on 25 October 1964. In total, he represented his country twice, with his second cap coming against Belgium in March 1965.

== Footballing family ==
His uncle Denis Doyle was a member of the very first Shamrock Rovers side to win the League of Ireland title in 1922–23. He went on to win three League medals and one FAI Cup medal during his time at Milltown. He also played on the occasion of Ireland's first international game which was against Italy in Turin in March 1926. His younger brother, Tommy "Netler" Doyle also played for Shamrock Rovers. He went on to win the League of Ireland Shield and the Leinster Senior Cup while at Rovers.

== Honours ==
Shamrock Rovers

- League of Ireland: 1963–64
- FAI Cup: 1964, 1965
- League of Ireland Shield: 1962–63, 1963–64, 1964–65, 1965–66
- Leinster Senior Cup: 1964
- Dublin City Cup: 1963–64
- Top Four Cup: 1965–66
- Blaxnit Cup: 1967–68

Athlone Town

- Leinster Senior Cup: 1969–70

== Sources ==
- Paul Doolan; Robert Goggins. The Hoops. ISBN 0-7171-2121-6.
