= James Lawler =

James Lawler may refer to:

- James F. Lawler (born 1935), American politician
- James R. Lawler (1929–2013), Australian literary critic

== See also ==
- James Lawlor (disambiguation)
