= Sean Core =

Irish footballer

Personal information
- Place of birth: Dublin, Ireland
- Position: Wing half

Senior career*
Years	Team	Apps	(Gls)
1965–1968	Shamrock Rovers	21	(0)
1968	Sligo Rovers	4	(0)
1968–1972	Shelbourne	87	(5)
1972	Rialto		
1972–1975	Limerick	65	(0)

International career
1966	Republic of Ireland U23	0	(0)
- * Club domestic league appearances and goals

Sean Core is an Irish former footballer who played as a half back.

== Career ==
He joined Shamrock Rovers in 1965 and played in 3 European Cup Winners' Cup games one of which was a draw at Dalymount Park against FC Bayern Munich.

He was part of the "Boston Rovers" squad that travelled to the United States in the summer of 1967, to take part in a tournament held to raise the profile of the game in that country.

In January 1968 he joined Sligo Rovers F.C. as a full-time professional. In March he was suspended for the rest of that season.

Signed for Shelbourne in August 1968.

In August 1972 he was placed on his own request, on the transfer list.

Played for Rialto before signing for Limerick F.C. in December 1972.

Was released at the end of the 1974/75 season.

== Honours ==
- Top Four Cup
  - Shamrock Rovers 1966
- Dublin City Cup
  - Shamrock Rovers 1966/67
- FAI Cup
  - Shamrock Rovers 1966

== Sources ==
- Paul Doolan; Robert Goggins. The Hoops. ISBN 0-7171-2121-6.
