= 1951–52 League of Ireland =

League of Ireland
- Season: 1951–52
- Champions: St Patrick's Athletic (1st title)
- Matches played: 132
- Goals scored: 521 (3.95 per match)
- Top goalscorer: Shay Gibbons (26 goals)
- Biggest home win: Dundalk 6–0 Limerick; Shamrock Rovers 6–0 Sligo Rovers; Sligo Rovers 6–0 Limerick
- Biggest away win: Bohemians 1–5 St Patrick's Athletic
- Highest scoring: Shelbourne 4–4 Drumcondra; Shelbourne 6–2 Sligo Rovers; Sligo Rovers 4–4 Shelbourne; Waterford 2–6 Transport

The 1951–52 League of Ireland was the 31st season of senior football in the Republic of Ireland.

Cork Athletic were the two-time defending champions.

== Changes from 1950–51 ==
Two new teams were elected to the League: Evergreen United and St Patrick's Athletic.

== Teams ==
Locations of the 1951–52 League of Ireland teams

Team	Location	Stadium
Bohemians	Dublin (Phibsborough)	Dalymount Park
Cork Athletic	Cork (Mardyke)	Mardyke
Drumcondra	Dublin (Clonturk)	Clonturk Park
Dundalk	Dundalk	Oriel Park
Evergreen United	Cork (Turners Cross)	Turners Cross
Limerick	Limerick	Markets Field
Shamrock Rovers	Dublin (Milltown)	Glenmalure Park
Shelbourne	Dublin (Ringsend)	Shelbourne Park
Sligo Rovers	Sligo	The Showgrounds
St Patrick's Athletic	Dublin (Inchicore)	Richmond Park
Transport	Bray	Carlisle Grounds
Waterford	Waterford	Kilcohan Park

== Season overview ==
St Patrick's Athletic won their first title.

== Final classification ==
Pos	Team	Pld	W	D	L	GF	GA	GD	Pts
1	St Patrick's Athletic	22	16	2	4	59	34	+25	34
2	Shelbourne	22	13	5	4	59	44	+15	31
3	Shamrock Rovers	22	12	5	5	43	18	+25	29
4	Sligo Rovers	22	13	3	6	49	46	+3	29
5	Evergreen United	22	11	2	9	44	42	+2	24
6	Drumcondra	22	9	5	8	47	33	+14	23
7	Bohemians	22	8	3	11	37	41	−4	19
8	Waterford	22	8	3	11	47	54	−7	19
9	Transport	22	7	3	12	43	50	−7	17
10	Cork Athletic	22	6	3	13	36	44	−8	15
11	Dundalk	22	4	7	11	37	50	−13	15
12	Limerick	22	2	5	15	20	65	−45	9

Source: RSSSF, foot.dk

== Results ==
Home \ Away	BOH	CAT	DRU	DUN	EVE	LIM	SHM	SHE	SLI	STP	TRA	WAT
Bohemians	—	4–1	3–2	3–1	3–1	2–0	1–4	3–2	1–2	1–5	3–0	1–4
Cork Athletic	2–2	—	1–0	2–2	1–3	5–0	2–1	3–4	1–4	0–1	2–2	3–1
Drumcondra	0–0	0–2	—	3–2	4–1	4–0	1–0	6–1	3–1	1–3	5–0	2–3
Dundalk	1–1	2–5	2–1	—	2–1	6–0	0–2	0–3	1–1	1–1	3–3	4–0
Evergreen United	1–0	2–0	3–2	3–1	—	1–1	0–3	1–2	5–0	1–1	4–2	4–3
Limerick	0–3	3–0	0–0	3–3	2–5	—	0–3	1–1	1–2	2–3	1–1	3–1
Shamrock Rovers	1–0	3–1	1–1	1–1	3–1	2–0	—	3–2	6–0	3–1	0–1	1–2
Shelbourne	2–1	3–2	4–4	3–1	3–1	4–0	1–1	—	6–2	3–1	5–2	1–1
Sligo Rovers	3–0	1–0	2–1	4–2	3–1	6–0	1–1	4–4	—	2–1	2–1	3–2
St Patrick's Athletic	3–2	1–0	1–2	5–2	5–1	4–2	1–0	6–1	3–1	—	4–3	3–2
Transport	2–1	2–1	1–3	3–0	0–1	5–1	0–3	1–2	2–3	1–2	—	5–2
Waterford	4–2	3–2	2–2	2–0	1–3	4–0	1–1	0–2	4–2	3–4	2–6	—

Source: extratime.com
Legend: Blue = home team win; Yellow = draw; Red = away team win.

== Top goalscorers ==
Rank	Player	Club	Goals
1	(Republic of Ireland) Shay Gibbons	St Patrick's Athletic	26
2	(Republic of Ireland) Rory Dwyer	Shelbourne	22
3	(Republic of Ireland) Dessie Glynn	Drumcondra	20
4	(Republic of Ireland) Billy Burns	Shamrock Rovers	15
4	(Republic of Ireland) Seán McCarthy	Evergreen United	15
6	(Republic of Ireland) Jack Fitzgerald	Waterford	14
7	(Republic of Ireland) Joey Dunne	Bohemians	12
8	(Republic of Ireland) Liam Coll	Sligo Rovers	11
8	(Republic of Ireland) Bernie Lester	Transport	11
10	(Republic of Ireland) Johnny Armstrong	Sligo Rovers	10
10	(Scotland) Jimmy Nelson	Waterford	10
10	(Republic of Ireland) Johnny Vaughan	Cork Athletic	10
