= Top Four Cup =

- Founded: 1955–56
- Region: Republic of Ireland
- Teams: 4
- Most championships: Waterford (5 wins)

The Top Four Cup was an association football super cup featuring the top four clubs in the League of Ireland. It was first held in 1955–56 and last played for in 1973–74. It was played at the end of the season. Shamrock Rovers were the inaugural winners and subsequently featured in seven finals. Waterford won the competition the most times, five times in total. The competition was sponsored by the Irish Independent and a result was also known as the Independent Cup. The cup was last won by Cork Celtic and is currently on display in the Evergreen Bar in Turners Cross, Cork. During the late 1960s the (Northern) Irish Football League also organised a Top Four Cup. Between 1998 and 2001 the FAI organised a similar formatted competition known as the FAI Super Cup.

== List of finals ==
Season	Winner	Score	Runners-up	Venue
1955–56	Shamrock Rovers	1–0	Waterford	Dalymount Park
1956–57	Evergreen United	2–1	Drumcondra	Dalymount Park
1957–58	Shamrock Rovers	2–1	Drumcondra	Dalymount Park
1958–59	Evergreen United	1–0	Shamrock Rovers	Dalymount Park
1959–60	Cork Celtic	2–1	Shelbourne	Dalymount Park
1960–61	Drumcondra	1–1	Cork Celtic	Dalymount Park
Replay	Drumcondra	2–2	Cork Celtic	The Mardyke
2nd Replay	Drumcondra	3–0	Cork Celtic	Tolka Park
1961–62	Shelbourne	2–1	Cork Celtic	Dalymount Park
1962–63	Drumcondra	2–2	Cork Celtic	Tolka Park
Replay	Drumcondra	4–3	Cork Celtic	Turners Cross
1963–64	Dundalk	0–0	Limerick	Dalymount Park
Replay	Dundalk	2–0	Limerick	Tolka Park
1964–65	Drumcondra	3–0	Shamrock Rovers	Dalymount Park
1965–66	Shamrock Rovers	3–3	Bohemians	Dalymount Park
Replay	Shamrock Rovers	1–1	Bohemians	Tolka Park
2nd Replay	Shamrock Rovers	3–0	Bohemians	Dalymount Park
1966–67	Dundalk	0–0	Bohemians	Dalymount Park
Replay	Dundalk	2–1	Bohemians	Tolka Park
1967–68	Waterford	3–2	Shamrock Rovers	Tolka Park
1968–69	Waterford	2–0	Shamrock Rovers	Tolka Park
1969–70	Waterford	6–2	Cork Hibernians	Kilcohan Park
1970–71	Waterford	3–0	Cork Hibernians	Tolka Park
1971–72	Bohemians	2–1	Finn Harps	Dalymount Park
1972–73	Waterford	6–2	Bohemians	Tolka Park
1973–74	Cork Celtic (Note: Cork Celtic won on penalties)	0–0	Bohemians	Flower Lodge

== See also ==
- FAI Super Cup
- LFA President's Cup
- President of Ireland's Cup
- Top Four Cup (Northern Ireland)
