= Billy Dixon (footballer, born 1941) =

Irish association footballer (born 1941)

Personal information
- Date of birth: 12 February 1941 (age 85)
- Place of birth: Dublin, Ireland

Youth career
- 1958–1960: Home Farm

Senior career*
Years	Team	Apps	(Gls)
1960–1962	Waterford	34	(3)
1962–1966	Drumcondra	60	(18)
1966—1971	Shamrock Rovers	85	(12)
1967	→ Boston Rovers (loan)	11	(2)
1971–1972	Drogheda	14	(1)

International career
	League of Ireland XI	12	
- * Club domestic league appearances and goals

Billy Dixon (born 12 February 1941) is an Irish former footballer.

He began his career at Home Farm F.C. and after playing for Waterford United F.C. he signed for Drumcondra where he made his debut in a 5–5 draw with Shamrock Rovers in 1963. He scored in Inter-Cities Fairs Cup wins over Danish side B 1909 of Odense (twice) and Bayern Munich.

He joined Shamrock Rovers F.C. in June 1966 and scored on his debut.

He earned one League of Ireland XI while at Milltown and 12 in total and scored 4 goals in 10 appearances in the UEFA Cup Winners' Cup.

Dixon scored the winner in his only FAI Cup final in 1967.

He scored twice while playing for Rovers when they represented Boston as Boston Rovers in the summer of 1967 United Soccer Association.

He was placed on the transfer list in July 1971 after five years at Glenmalure Park.

Dixon signed for Drogheda United F.C. soon after with Joe Haverty and scored on his debut against Rovers. Over his career he accumulated 6 goals in 12 European cup games.

== Honours ==
- League of Ireland: 1
  - Drumcondra - 1964/65
- FAI Cup: 1
  - Shamrock Rovers - 1967
- League of Ireland Shield: 1
  - Shamrock Rovers - 1967/68
- Leinster Senior Cup: 1
  - Shamrock Rovers - 1969
- Dublin City Cup: 1
  - Shamrock Rovers - 1966/67
- Top Four Cup: 3
  - Drumcondra - 1962/63, 1964/65
  - Shamrock Rovers - 1965/66

== Sources ==
=== Bibliography ===
- The Hoops by Paul Doolan and Robert Goggins (ISBN 0-7171-2121-6)
