= John O'Neill (footballer, born 1935) =

Irish footballer

Personal information
- Full name: John Nicholas O'Neill
- Date of birth: 8 September 1935
- Place of birth: Dublin, Ireland
- Date of death: 23 September 2012 (aged 77)
- Place of death: Blackpool, England
- Position: Utility player

Senior career*
Years	Team	Apps	(Gls)
1953–1958	Drumcondra	55	(2)
1958–1963	Preston North End	50	(0)
1963–1964	Barrow	35	(3)
1964–1965	Drumcondra	18	(5)
1965	Melbourne Hakoah	16	(5)
1965	Drumcondra	2	(0)
1965–1976	Waterford	208	(67)

International career
1960	Republic of Ireland	1	(0)
- * Club domestic league appearances and goals

John Nicholas O'Neill (8 September 1935 – 23 September 2012) was an Irish professional footballer.

He was a defender who started his career with Drumcondra in his native city before moving to Preston North End in April 1958 along with team-mate Alan Kelly. He eventually went on to replace the legendary Joe Walton at left back and played for Preston 50 times. O'Neill won his only cap for the Republic of Ireland national football team on 28 September 1960 against Wales at Dalymount Park.

O'Neill moved to Barrow in July 1963 for a £1,500 fee.

He died on 23 September 2012, aged 77.
