= Fred Hutchinson (disambiguation) =

Fred Hutchinson (1919–1964) was an American baseball player and manager.

Fred, Freddie or Frederick Hutchinson may refer to: People:

- Fred Hutchinson (shortstop) (1886–1954), American baseball player
- Fred Hutchinson (rugby union) (1867–1941), Welsh rugby union player
- Freddie Hutchinson (1912–1973), Irish footballer

Places:

- Fred Hutchinson Cancer Center
