= Mick Hoy (footballer) =

Irish footballer

Personal information
- Full name: Michael Hoy
- Date of birth: 26 September 1909
- Place of birth: Tandragee, County Armagh, Ireland
- Date of death: 1984 (aged 74–75)
- Position: Left-back

Youth career
- Tandragee Rovers

Senior career*
Years	Team	Apps	(Gls)
- Glenavon
1937–19xx	Dundalk		

International career
1937–39	Ireland	6	(0)
1939	League of Ireland XI	2	(0)

Managerial career
- 1950s: Tandragee Rovers
- * Club domestic league appearances and goals

Mick Hoy (26 September 1909 – 1984) was an Irish footballer who played for Glenavon, Dundalk and Ireland. During the 1950s Hoy returned to his local club, Tandragee Rovers, where he worked as a coach with the senior and youth teams.

== Irish international ==
When Hoy began his international career in 1937 there were, in effect, two Ireland teams, chosen by two rival associations. Both associations, the Northern Ireland - based IFA and the Irish Free State - based FAI claimed jurisdiction over the whole of Ireland and selected players from the whole island. Hoy was one of several players born in Northern Ireland who benefited from the FAI's attempts to establish their all-Ireland influence.

Between 1937 and 1939 Hoy made 6 appearances for the FAI XI. He won all of these caps while playing for Dundalk. Together with fellow Northerner, Tommy Donnelly, he made his international debut in a 3-2 away defeat to Norway on 10 October 1937 in a qualifier for the 1938 FIFA World Cup. He made his final appearance for the FAI XI on 23 May 1939 in a 1-1 draw with Germany. In 1939, together with Jimmy Dunne and Kevin O'Flanagan, he also played twice for the League of Ireland XI, helping them to 2-1 victories against an Irish League XI and a Scottish League XI.

== Honours ==
Dundalk

- Dublin City Cup
  - Winners 1937-38: 1
- FAI Cup
  - Runners Up 1937-38: 1
- Leinster Senior Cup
  - Runners Up 1938-39: 1
