= Joseph Grace =

Joseph or Joe Grace may refer to:

- Joseph Patrick Grace (born 1949), American film producer
- Joseph Peter Grace Sr. (1872–1950), American businessman
- J. Peter Grace (1913–1995), American businessman
- Joe Grace (baseball) (1914–1969), baseball outfielder
- Joe Grace (Australian footballer) (1878–1919), Australian rules footballer
- Joe Grace (Irish footballer) (died 1959), Ireland international footballer
