= Vincent Ryan (footballer) =

Irish footballer

Personal information
- Full name: Vincent Ryan
- Date of birth: 25 October 1935 (age 91)
- Place of birth: Dublin, Ireland
- Position: Forward

Youth career
- 19xx–1953: Home Farm

Senior career*
Years	Team	Apps	(Gls)
1953–1957	Celtic	22	(3)
1957–1959	St Mirren	24	(5)
1959–1964	Drumcondra	23	(7)
- * Club domestic league appearances and goals

Vincent Ryan (born 25 October 1935) was an Irish footballer. Son of a founder member of Home Farm (Hamilton Ryan), Ryan played as forward for Home Farm, Celtic and St Mirren. Ryan married Sylvia Cerasi in 1975 and had two sons Conor and Robert Ryan.

== Early years ==
As a schoolboy Ryan played football for Home Farm. He was spotted by Billy Behan. Matt Busby called at his home to sign the young Ryan but negotiations failed and Ryan went on to sign for Celtic a year later for a fee of one thousand pounds. Busby went on to sign Ryan's teammate Liam (Billy) Whelan.
