= Senator Lawler =

Senator Lawler may refer to:

- Daisy Lawler (born 1942), Oklahoma State Senate
- James F. Lawler (born 1935), South Dakota State Senate
