= Vincent Ryan =

Vincent Ryan may refer to:

- Vincent Ryan (footballer) (born 1935), Irish footballer
- Vincent James Ryan (1884–1951), Bishop of Bismarck, 1940–1951
- Vincent Ryan (bishop) (1816–1888), Bishop of Mauritius, 1854–1869
