= Paddy Meehan (footballer) =

Republic of Ireland footballer

Personal information
- Full name: Patrick Meehan
- Position: Forward

Senior career*
Years	Team	Apps	(Gls)
- Drumcondra

International career
1934	Republic of Ireland	1	(0)
- * Club domestic league appearances and goals

Paddy Meehan was an Irish footballer who played as a forward.

Meehan was capped once for the Republic of Ireland national team at senior level. He made his debut in a 5–2 defeat to the Netherlands on 8 April 1934.

At club level, Meehan played for Drumcondra between 1933 and 1939 then moved to Bray Unknowns for two seasons before moving back to Drums in 1941.
