= Paddy Byrne =

Republic of Ireland footballer

Personal information
- Full name: Patrick Byrne
- Position: Defender

Senior career*
Years	Team	Apps	(Gls)
1931–1932	Shelbourne	2	
1934–1934	Drumcondra	1	

International career
1931–34	Republic of Ireland	3	(0)
- * Club domestic league appearances and goals

Paddy Byrne was an Irish Free State international footballer.

A defender, Byrne was capped three times for the Irish Free State at senior level. He made his debut in a 1–1 draw with Spain on 26 April 1931 in Barcelona and played twice against the Netherlands national football team, in 1932 and 1934.

At club level, Byrne played for Dolphin, Shelbourne and Dumcondra, all based in Dublin.
