= James Lawlor =

James Lawlor is the name of:

- Jim Lalor (1878–1956), Irish hurler
- Jimmy Lawlor (1933–2012), Irish footballer
