= Tommy Donnelly (footballer) =

Irish association footballer

Personal information
- Full name: Thomas Donnelly
- Place of birth: Enniskillen, County Fermanagh, Ireland
- Date of death: 28/01/1994
- Place of death: Enniskillen
- Position: Forward

Senior career*
Years	Team	Apps	(Gls)
193x–1937	Drumcondra		
1937–1938	Shamrock Rovers		

International career
1937–1938	Ireland	2	(1)
- * Club domestic league appearances and goals

Tommy Donnelly (died 28 January 1994) was an Irish footballer who played for Drumcondra, Shamrock Rovers and Ireland.

When Donnelly played as an international there were, in effect, two Ireland teams, chosen by two rival associations. Both associations, the Northern Ireland - based IFA and the Irish Free State - based FAI claimed jurisdiction over the whole of Ireland and selected players from the whole island. Donnelly was one of several players born in Northern Ireland who benefited from the FAI's attempts to establish their all-Ireland influence. He made 2 appearances and scored 1 goal for the FAI XI. Together with fellow Ulsterman, Mick Hoy, he made his international debut in a 3–2 away defeat to Norway on 10 October 1937, in a qualifier for the 1938 World Cup.

Donnelly won his first cap while with Drumcondra and subsequently joined Shamrock Rovers. He made his second appearance for the FAI XI on 18 September 1938 in a friendly against Switzerland and scored the fourth goal in 4–0 win. The other goal scorers that day were Paddy Bradshaw and Connelly's Rovers teammate, Jimmy Dunne. Despite getting on the score sheet against the Swiss, Donnelly later lost his place to Kevin O'Flanagan and was released by Rovers shortly afterwards.

== Honours ==
Shamrock Rovers

- League of Ireland
  - Winners 1937-38: 1
- League of Ireland Shield
  - Winners 1937-38: 1
- Leinster Senior Cup
  - Winners 1938: 1

== Sources ==
- The Boys In Green - The FAI International Story (1997): Sean Ryan
