= Fran Brennan =

Irish former association football player

Personal information
- Date of birth: 14 February 1940 (age 86)
- Place of birth: Dublin, Ireland
- Position: Defender

Senior career*
Years	Team	Apps	(Gls)
1957–1961	Shelbourne	3	(0)
1961–1962	Transport	34	(1)
1962–1966	Drumcondra	74	(0)
1966–1973	Dundalk	153	(2)
1973–1974	Shelbourne	8	(0)
1974–1977	Belgrove		
1977–1978	Galway Rovers	29	(0)
1978–1979	Bray Wanderers		
1979–1985	Bluebell United		

International career
1965	Republic of Ireland	1	(0)
- * Club domestic league appearances and goals

Fran Brennan (born 14 February 1940) is an Irish former footballer.

== Career ==
He played for Transport, Drumcondra, Dundalk and Shelbourne at club level, winning the league title with Drumcondra in 1965 and Dundalk in 1967. He later served as manager of Dundalk.

On 24 March 1965, he won his only senior cap for the Republic of Ireland national football team when he lined out in defence in a 2–0 defeat to Belgium in a friendly international played at Dalymount Park.

Fran subsequently was involved in the underage set up assisting Paddy Hilliard with Under 14 International teams.

Fran came from a family of 10, with 4 sisters and 6 brothers. His brother Tom was an Irish Senior Cross Country Champion, winning the title in 1975 and was a significant contributor to the development of the Liffey Valley Athletic Club.

His nephew is Dublin county football team manager Ger Brennan
