= Bobby Duffy =

Irish footballer

Personal information
- Full name: Robert Duffy
- Date of birth: 1 October 1930 ?
- Place of birth: Dublin
- Date of death: January 1992
- Position: Forward

Senior career*
Years	Team	Apps	(Gls)
19??–1948	St James's Gate		
1948–1951	Shamrock Rovers	29	(19)
1951–1952	Transport		(0)
1952–1954	Bray Wanderers		
1954–1955	Drumcondra	9	(2)
1954	→ Bangor (loan)		

International career
1950	Republic of Ireland	1	(1)
- * Club domestic league appearances and goals

Robert Duffy (died January 1992) was an Irish footballer.

He played for St James's Gate F.C., Shamrock Rovers F.C. and Drumcondra as a forward.

He won his only senior cap and also scored for Ireland on 10 May 1950 in a 5-1 defeat to Belgium in Brussels.
