= Lar O'Byrne =

Irish footballer

Lar O'Byrne (10 August 1924 – 5 November 2015) was an Irish footballer.

== Career ==
After playing for junior side CY Ringsend, he joined Shamrock Rovers in 1946 under Bob Fullam and was later managed by Jimmy Dunne. In 1951 he fell out with the then owners the Cunninghams over wages and left for Drumcondra He retired from the game in 1960.

He won one senior cap for the Republic of Ireland on 24 April 1949 in a 2–0 friendly loss against Belgium at Dalymount Park. He represented the League of Ireland XI 4 times while at Glenmalure Park in 1949. The mother of former Hoop Johnny Fullam was Lar's half sister. His cousin Kevin Martin boxed for Ireland at the 1948 Summer Olympics and 1952 Summer Olympics.

On Friday, 10 April 2009, Lar was honoured at Tallaght Stadium with a reception and he was presented with a Dublin Crystal memento of his time with the Club.

As of September 2012 O'Byrne was Rovers' oldest surviving player. He died on 5 November 2015, aged 91.

== Sources ==
- Paul Doolan; Robert Goggins. The Hoops. ISBN 0-7171-2121-6.
