= Alan Kelly Jr. =

Ireland international footballer and coach

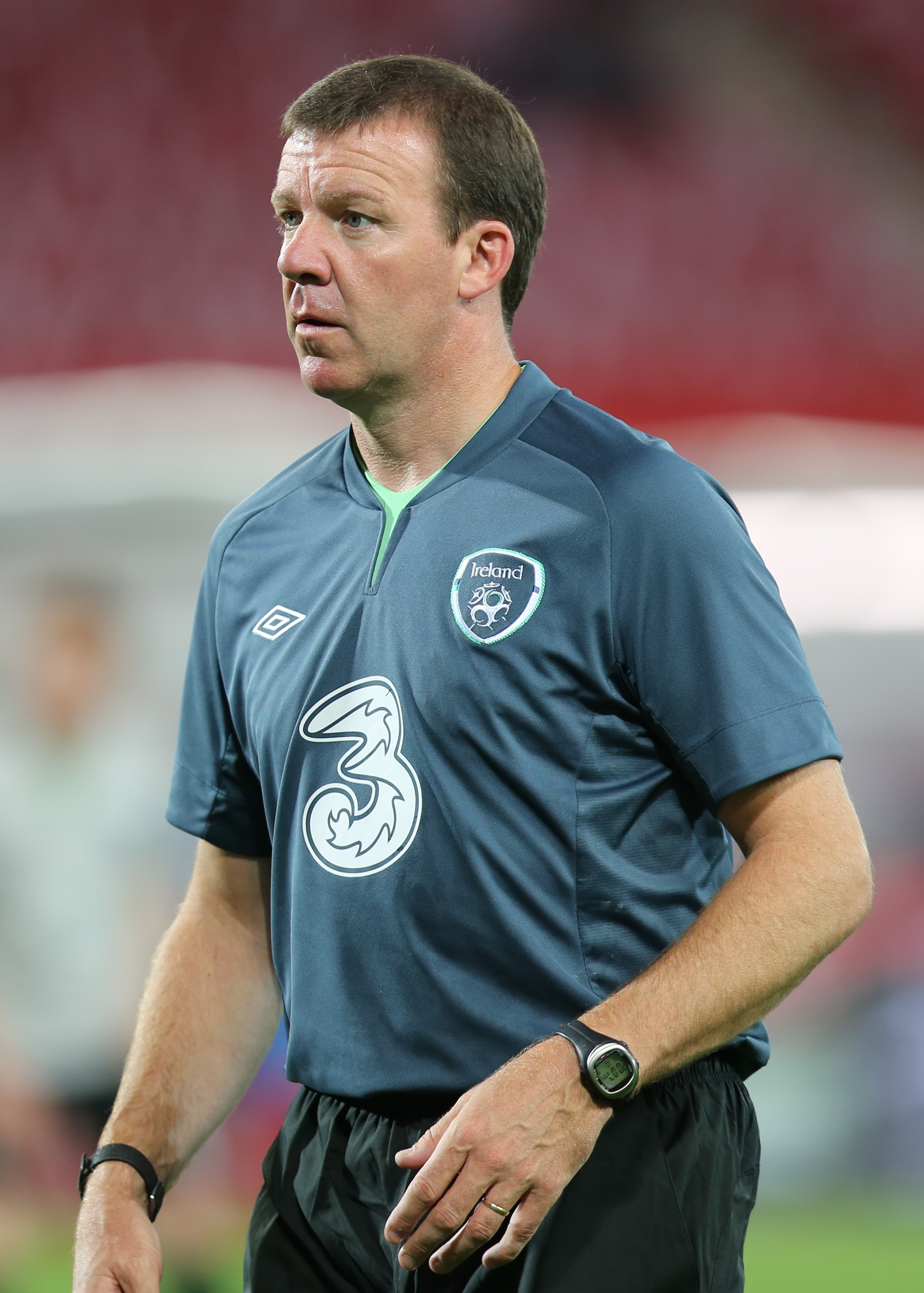
- Kelly in 2013

Personal information
- Full name: Alan Thomas Kelly
- Date of birth: 11 August 1968 (age 58)
- Place of birth: Preston, England
- Height: 6 ft 2 in (1.88 m)
- Position: Goalkeeper

Youth career
- –: Preston North End

Senior career*
Years	Team	Apps	(Gls)
1985–1992	Preston North End	142	(0)
1992–1999	Sheffield United	214	(0)
1999–2004	Blackburn Rovers	39	(0)
2001	→ Stockport County (loan)	2	(0)
2001	→ Birmingham City (loan)	6	(0)
Total		403	(0)

International career
1990	Republic of Ireland U23	1	(0)
1993–2002	Republic of Ireland	34	(0)
- * Club domestic league appearances and goals

Alan Thomas Kelly (born 11 August 1968) is an Irish former professional footballer who most recently was goalkeeper coach at Everton. He played as a goalkeeper for Preston North End, Sheffield United and Blackburn Rovers, along with short loan spells at Stockport County and Birmingham City. Born in Preston, Kelly represented the Republic of Ireland internationally, winning 34 caps for his country. Both his father, Alan Kelly Sr., who also represented Ireland, and older brother, Gary Kelly, played as goalkeepers.

== Club career ==
Kelly started his career at Preston North End in the Fourth Division, following the footsteps of his father, Alan Kelly Sr., and played 142 League games for the team.

He joined Sheffield United in July 1992 for £150,000. Kelly stayed with Sheffield United until 1999, despite their relegation from the Premiership shortly into his career with them. In total, he made 213 appearances for the Blades. He also helped Sheffield United to the FA Cup semi finals in both 1992-93 and 1997-98 seasons. In the 1992-93 quarter finals against Blackburn Rovers the tie went to a penalty shootout after a replay, and Kelly saved the decisive penalty from Jason Wilcox to send Sheffield United through. He repeated the heroics five years later in another quarter final replay, this time against Coventry City; the game went to a penalty shootout and Kelly saved from Dion Dublin, Simon Haworth and David Burrows to help his side progress.

In 1999, Kelly transferred to Blackburn Rovers, making 39 appearances, and stayed there until his retirement from football in 2004. This time also included loan spells at Stockport County and Birmingham City. He made more than 470 appearances in all competitions at club level.

== International career ==
Kelly won 34 caps for the Republic of Ireland, and was a member of the Republic's 1994 and 2002 World Cup squads. He was the team's second-choice goalkeeper on both occasions (behind Packie Bonner and Shay Given respectively), and never played in a World Cup game. In 1999 he was named as FAI Senior International Player of the Year.

== Later career ==
In the summer of 2006, Kelly was goalkeeping coach for the Soccer-Academy camps, located in Virginia, Maryland, Delaware and Pennsylvania in the United States.

After spending 18 months at Preston North End's Centre of Excellence Kelly became the new goalkeeping coach following the dismissal of Phil Brown and appointment of David Unsworth as caretaker manager. He left the post in August 2017. In October, he linked up again with Unsworth, who was the newly appointed caretaker manager of Premier League club Everton. In December 2019 he joined John Ebbrell and Francis Jeffers as the coaching team supporting caretaker manager Duncan Ferguson, who took over Everton's first team, after Marco Silva was sacked on 5 December.

On 13 August 2024 Everton confirmed Kelly had departed the club.

== Honours ==
Blackburn Rovers

- Football League Cup: 2002

Individual

- FAI Senior International Player of the Year: 1999
- First Division PFA Team of the Year: 1995–96, 1996–97

== See also ==
- List of Republic of Ireland international footballers born outside the Republic of Ireland
