= 1948–49 League of Ireland =

League of Ireland
- Season: 1948–49
- Champions: Drumcondra (2nd title)
- Matches played: 90
- Goals scored: 332 (3.69 per match)
- Top goalscorer: Bernard Lester; Eugene Noonan; Patrick O'Leary (12 goals each)
- Biggest home win: Waterford 5–0 Transport
- Biggest away win: Bohemians 0–6 Shelbourne
- Highest scoring: Transport 6–2 Limerick; Transport 2–6 Cork Athletic

The 1948–49 League of Ireland was the 28th season of senior football in the Republic of Ireland.

Drumcondra were the defending champions.

== Changes from 1947–48 ==
Two new teams were elected to the League: Sligo Rovers returned after an eight-year absence, while Transport made their début. This resulted in an expansion in size for the first time in six seasons, from eight to ten.

For the first time in the history of the League, there were more teams from outside Dublin (six) than from Dublin (four).

== Teams ==
Locations of the 1948–49 League of Ireland teams

| Team | Location | Stadium |
|---|---|---|
| Bohemians | Dublin (Phibsborough) | Dalymount Park |
| Cork United | Cork | Mardyke |
| Cork Athletic | Cork | Mardyke |
| Drumcondra | Dublin (Clonturk) | Clonturk Park |
| Dundalk | Dundalk | Oriel Park |
| Limerick | Limerick | Markets Field |
| Shamrock Rovers | Dublin (Milltown) | Glenmalure Park |
| Shelbourne | Dublin (Ringsend) | Shelbourne Park |
| Sligo Rovers | Sligo | The Showgrounds |
| Transport | Bray | Carlisle Grounds |
| Waterford | Waterford | Kilcohan Park |

== Season overview ==
Cork United resigned from the League on 10 October 1948 and disbanded following their participation in the Dublin City Cup. Cork Athletic were founded with a new board and elected in their place.

Drumcondra successfully defended their title.

== Table ==
| Pos | Team | Pld | W | D | L | GF | GA | GD | Pts |
|---|---|---|---|---|---|---|---|---|---|
| 1 | Drumcondra | 18 | 12 | 5 | 1 | 34 | 23 | +11 | 29 |
| 2 | Shelbourne | 18 | 9 | 5 | 4 | 39 | 23 | +16 | 23 |
| 3 | Dundalk | 18 | 9 | 5 | 4 | 33 | 24 | +9 | 23 |
| 4 | Shamrock Rovers | 18 | 6 | 8 | 4 | 33 | 25 | +8 | 20 |
| 5 | Transport | 18 | 5 | 8 | 5 | 35 | 41 | −6 | 18 |
| 6 | Limerick | 18 | 6 | 5 | 7 | 27 | 35 | −8 | 17 |
| 7 | Waterford | 18 | 7 | 1 | 10 | 39 | 34 | +5 | 15 |
| 8 | Sligo Rovers | 18 | 4 | 5 | 9 | 31 | 37 | −6 | 13 |
| 9 | Cork Athletic | 18 | 6 | 1 | 11 | 33 | 41 | −8 | 13 |
| 10 | Bohemians | 18 | 2 | 5 | 11 | 28 | 49 | −21 | 9 |

Source: RSSSF, foot.dk

== Results ==
| Home \ Away | BOH | CAT | DRU | DUN | LIM | SHM | SHE | SLI | TRA | WAT |
|---|---|---|---|---|---|---|---|---|---|---|
| Bohemians | — | 2–2 | 1–3 | 1–4 | 2–3 | 2–1 | 0–6 | 1–2 | 2–2 | 3–2 |
| Cork Athletic | 3–1 | — | 2–4 | 0–2 | 2–0 | 3–4 | 2–5 | 3–2 | 3–0 | 0–2 |
| Drumcondra | 3–2 | 1–0 | — | 1–0 | 1–1 | 1–1 | 2–2 | 2–1 | 2–1 | 1–4 |
| Dundalk | 2–2 | 2–1 | 0–0 | — | 2–1 | 2–1 | 1–1 | 1–1 | 1–2 | 4–0 |
| Limerick | 2–1 | 5–2 | 0–1 | 3–2 | — | 1–1 | 0–2 | 3–2 | 1–1 | 1–5 |
| Shamrock Rovers | 2–2 | 3–1 | 2–3 | 3–0 | 0–0 | — | 2–0 | 2–2 | 2–2 | 4–1 |
| Shelbourne | 0–0 | 0–1 | 3–4 | 0–1 | 3–1 | 1–0 | — | 2–1 | 3–1 | 2–2 |
| Sligo Rovers | 3–1 | 5–2 | 0–1 | 3–4 | 1–1 | 1–1 | 1–4 | — | 1–1 | 0–3 |
| Transport | 4–3 | 2–6 | 1–1 | 3–3 | 6–2 | 1–1 | 3–1 | 4–3 | — | 2–0 |
| Waterford | 5–2 | 1–0 | 2–3 | 1–2 | 1–2 | 2–3 | 2–3 | 1–2 | 5–0 | — |

Source: Extratime.ie
Legend: Blue = home team win; Yellow = draw; Red = away team win.

== Top goalscorers ==
| Rank | Player | Club | Goals |
|---|---|---|---|
| 1 | (Republic of Ireland) Bernard Lester | Transport | 12 |
| 1 | (Republic of Ireland) Eugene Noonan | Waterford | 12 |
| 1 | (Republic of Ireland) Patrick O'Leary | Cork Athletic | 12 |
| 4 | (Republic of Ireland) Brendan Carroll | Shelbourne | 10 |
| 4 | (Republic of Ireland) George Sergeant | Sligo Rovers | 10 |
| 6 | (Republic of Ireland) Kit Lawlor | Drumcondra | 9 |
| 6 | (Republic of Ireland) Paddy Mullen | Shamrock Rovers | 9 |
| 8 | (Republic of Ireland) Emmet McLoughlin | Bohemians | 8 |
| 8 | (Republic of Ireland) Gerry Malone | Shelbourne | 8 |
| 8 | (Republic of Ireland) Peadar Walsh | Dundalk | 8 |

== See also ==
- 1948–49 FAI Cup
- 1948–49 Dublin City Cup
- 1948–49 League of Ireland Shield
