= Kevin Clarke (Irish footballer) =

Irish footballer

Personal information
- Full name: Patrick Kevin Noel Clarke
- Date of birth: 3 December 1921
- Place of birth: Santry, Ireland
- Date of death: November 1990 (aged 68)
- Place of death: Gravesend, England
- Position: Half back

Senior career*
Years	Team	Apps	(Gls)
- Drumcondra
1948–1952	Swansea Town	10	
- Gravesend and Northfleet

International career
	League of Ireland XI	6	
1948	Republic of Ireland	2	(0)
- * Club domestic league appearances and goals

Kevin Clarke (3 December 1921 – November 1990) was an Irish soccer player.

== Career ==
He played for Drumcondra at club level where he won the FAI Cup twice. He then transferred to Swansea Town in November 1948. In season 1953-54 he joined Tunbridge Wells United

Clarke was capped twice by the Republic of Ireland national football team. He made his debut on 23 May 1948, in a 2–0 defeat to Portugal in a friendly international played in Lisbon. He played his only other senior international a week later in Barcelona, when Ireland were beaten 2-1 by Spain in another friendly international.

While with Drums he represented the League of Ireland six times.
