= Cork Athletic F.C. =

Irish football club based in Cork

- Full name: Cork Athletic Football Club
- Founded: 1948
- Dissolved: 1957
- Ground: The Mardyke; Cork
- League: League of Ireland
Home colours

Cork Athletic Football Club was an Irish football club based in Cork.

== History ==
The club played in the League of Ireland between 1948 and 1957. It was the successor club of Cork United; when United quit the league in October 1948, Cork Athletic was immediately formed to take its place.

Athletic won the league in 1950 and only lost the cup final against Transport after two replays. The following year it won a league and FAI Cup double after beating Shelbourne in a replay to win the cup. In 1953 Athletic won the first all-Cork FAI Cup final, beating Evergreen United 2–1. Athletic also began the Cork tradition of fielding veteran English League players by recruiting Sunderland legend Raich Carter.

The club eventually folded in 1957, due to financial problems. It was replaced in the League by Cork Hibernians.

== Colours ==
The club wore green shirts, inherited from the predecessor club, with white shorts and green socks.

== Honours ==
- League of Ireland: 2
  - 1949–50, 1950–51
- FAI Cup: 2
  - 1950–51, 1952–53
- Munster Senior Cup: 3
  - 1950–51, 1952–53, 1954–55

== Season placings ==
Chart of yearly table positions for Cork Athletic in League of Ireland

Season	Position
1956–57	8th
1955–56	9th
1954–55	5th
1953–54	4th
1952–53	8th
1951–52	10th
1950–51	1st
1949–50	1st
1948–49	9th

== Notable former players ==
=== Ireland (FAI) internationals ===
- (Republic of Ireland) Florrie Burke
- (Republic of Ireland) Noel Cantwell
- (Republic of Ireland) Ned Courtney
- (Ireland) (Republic of Ireland) Owen Madden
- (Republic of Ireland) Jack O'Reilly

=== Ireland (IFA) internationals ===
- (Ireland) (Republic of Ireland) Owen Madden

=== England internationals ===
- (England) Raich Carter

=== Scotland internationals ===
- (Scotland) Jimmy Delaney

=== Other sports ===
- (Republic of Ireland) Noel Cantwell – played cricket for Ireland
- (Republic of Ireland) Ned Courtney – played Gaelic football for Cork

== Notable former managers ==
- (Ireland) (Republic of Ireland) Owen Madden
- (England) Raich Carter
- (Scotland) Jimmy Delaney

== See also ==
- Cork F.C.
- Cork City F.C. (1938–1940)
- Cork United F.C. (1940–1948)
- League of Ireland in Cork city
