= Joe Grace (Irish footballer) =

Irish footballer (??–1959)

Personal information
- Full name: Joseph Grace
- Date of death: January 1959
- Position: Forward

Senior career*
Years	Team	Apps	(Gls)
- Bohemians
- Belfast Celtic
- Drumcondra

International career
1926	Irish Free State	1	(0)
- * Club domestic league appearances and goals

Joe Grace was an Ireland international footballer.

== International career ==
On 21 March 1926, Grace made his only appearance for the Irish Free State national football team in a 3–0 defeat to Italy in Turin.

His appearance at international level was controversial as the selectors included the former Belfast Celtic defender who was playing in the Leinster Senior League with Drumcondra at the time.

Grace had previously appeared for the Ireland amateur international team in November 1920 in a 4–0 defeat to England at Solitude, Belfast. This was an all island team.

== Club career ==
In 1927, Drumcondra became the first non-senior team south of the border to win the FAI Cup. They were competing in the Leinster Senior League at the time.

Grace, a tall, commanding, centre-half was hugely influential as Drumcondra defeated Brideville 1–0 in the final.

Drumcondra further enhanced their reputation and paved their way for promotion to the League of Ireland by reaching the final again the following year losing 2–1 to Bohemians.
