= 1960–61 League of Ireland =

League of Ireland
- Season: 1960–61
- Champions: Drumcondra (4th Title)
- European Cup: Drumcondra
- European Cup Winners Cup: St Patrick's Athletic
- Matches played: 132
- Goals scored: 477 (3.61 per match)
- Top goalscorer: Dan McCaffrey (Drumcondra), 29

Statistics of League of Ireland in the 1960/1961 season.

== Overview ==
It was contested by 12 teams, and Drumcondra won the championship and qualified to play in the 1961–62 European Cup for next season.

St Patrick's Athletic qualified to play in the 1961–62 European Cup Winners' Cup.

== Final classification ==
Pos	Team	Pld	W	D	L	GF	GA	GD	Pts	Qualification
1	Drumcondra	22	16	1	5	59	21	+38	33	European Cup
2	St Patrick's Athletic	22	14	4	4	43	28	+15	32	European Cup Winners' Cup
3	Waterford	22	12	5	5	45	33	+12	29	
4	Cork Celtic	22	11	4	7	52	31	+21	26	
5	Dundalk	22	12	2	8	43	37	+6	26	
6	Shamrock Rovers	22	9	7	6	40	29	+11	25	
7	Limerick	22	10	4	8	35	27	+8	24	
8	Shelbourne	22	7	5	10	43	41	+2	19	
9	Cork Hibernians	22	5	8	9	30	42	−12	18	
10	Transport	22	6	2	14	27	39	−12	14	
11	Bohemians	22	4	4	14	25	52	−27	12	
12	Sligo Rovers	22	1	4	17	35	97	−62	6	

Source: www.rsssf.com

== Results ==
Home \ Away	BOH	CCF	CHF	DRU	DUN	LIM	SHM	SHE	SLI	StP	TRA	WAT
Bohemians	—	1–2	2–2	1–0	2–5	0–1	0–2	3–3	5–0	0–4	1–0	1–1
Cork Celtic	3–1	—	3–0	4–3	1–2	2–3	0–1	0–2	3–1	5–0	4–2	0–0
Cork Hibernian	2–1	1–2	—	1–2	0–0	3–1	1–0	1–1	2–2	1–1	2–0	2–2
Drumcondra	6–1	0–2	2–0	—	3–0	2–0	1–1	2–1	8–0	6–0	4–0	3–0
Dundalk	1–0	2–2	2–0	3–1	—	1–0	3–1	4–3	5–2	1–2	1–0	1–3
Limerick	2–1	2–1	4–0	1–2	0–2	—	2–2	3–2	4–0	0–1	3–1	1–3
Shamrock Rovers	1–1	2–2	3–3	2–0	2–4	0–0	—	0–1	8–1	2–2	3–0	2–1
Shelbourne	2–0	0–3	3–4	1–2	4–2	1–1	1–3	—	5–5	0–1	0–1	2–2
Sligo Rovers	2–3	2–9	3–3	3–5	3–1	2–2	0–1	1–6	—	0–3	2–4	2–4
St Patrick's Athletic	3–0	3–2	3–1	0–2	2–1	1–0	3–2	0–2	7–1	—	1–1	4–0
Transport	6–1	1–1	2–1	0–1	2–1	0–3	0–1	0–2	4–0	1–2	—	2–3
Waterford	4–0	2–1	3–0	0–4	4–1	0–2	3–1	3–1	5–3	0–0	2–0	—

Legend: Blue = home team win; Yellow = draw; Red = away team win.

== Top scorers ==
Rank	Player	Club	Goals
1	Dan McCaffrey	Drumcondra	29
2	Donal Leahy	Cork Celtic	21
3	Jimmy Hasty	Dundalk	17
4	Eric Barber	Shelbourne	14
4	Damien Bradley	Sligo Rovers	14
6	Austin Noonan	Cork Celtic	12
7	Johnny McGeehan	St Patrick's Athletic	10
7	Ronnie Whelan	St Patrick's Athletic	10
9	Jack Fitzgerald	Waterford	9
10	Paddy Ambrose	Shamrock Rovers	8
10	Johnny Armstrong	Sligo Rovers	8
10	Eddie Bailham	Shamrock Rovers	8
10	Mick Geoghegan	Bohemians	8
10	Jackie Hennessy	Shelbourne	8
10	Paddy McDonnell	Dundalk	8
10	Jimmy Samson	Transport	8
