= 1950–51 League of Ireland =

League of Ireland
- Season: 1950–51
- Champions: Cork Athletic (2nd title)
- Matches played: 90
- Goals scored: 337 (3.74 per match)
- Top goalscorer: Desmond Glynn (20 goals)

The 1950–51 League of Ireland was the 30th season of senior football in the Republic of Ireland.

Cork Athletic were the defending champions.

== Changes from 1949–50 ==
No new teams were elected to the League.

== Teams ==
Locations of the 1950–51 League of Ireland teams

Team	Location	Stadium
Bohemians	Dublin (Phibsborough)	Dalymount Park
Cork Athletic	Cork	Mardyke
Drumcondra	Dublin (Clonturk)	Clonturk Park
Dundalk	Dundalk	Oriel Park
Limerick	Limerick	Markets Field
Shamrock Rovers	Dublin (Milltown)	Glenmalure Park
Shelbourne	Dublin (Ringsend)	Shelbourne Park
Sligo Rovers	Sligo	The Showgrounds
Transport	Bray	Carlisle Grounds
Waterford	Waterford	Kilcohan Park

== Season overview ==
Cork Athletic successfully defended their title.

== Final classification ==
Pos	Team	Pld	W	D	L	GF	GA	GD	Pts
1	Cork Athletic	18	12	2	4	46	22	+24	26
2	Sligo Rovers	18	11	3	4	39	25	+14	25
3	Drumcondra	18	8	7	3	37	26	+11	23
4	Shelbourne	18	8	4	6	37	27	+10	20
5	Bohemians	18	7	6	5	30	32	−2	20
6	Shamrock Rovers	18	7	3	8	33	30	+3	17
7	Transport	18	5	4	9	25	36	−11	14
8	Dundalk	18	4	4	10	35	44	−9	12
9	Waterford	18	5	2	11	28	47	−19	12
10	Limerick	18	4	3	11	27	48	−21	11

Source: RSSSF, foot.dk

== Results ==
Home \ Away	BOH	CAT	DRU	DUN	LIM	SHM	SHE	SLI	TRA	WAT
Bohemians	—	1–1	0–0	3–5	2–0	2–2	0–1	1–2	0–0	0–4
Cork Athletic	2–1	—	1–2	1–0	8–3	3–0	3–1	2–2	3–2	2–0
Drumcondra	3–1	1–2	—	0–0	3–2	0–4	2–2	0–0	3–0	3–0
Dundalk	2–1	3–2	1–1	—	2–1	1–1	3–2	0–0	5–0	2–1
Limerick	0–0	2–2	1–1	3–3	—	4–3	1–1	2–1	1–1	1–1
Shamrock Rovers	7–2	2–5	0–1	3–1	4–0	—	3–1	5–1	1–2	4–1
Shelbourne	4–0	1–1	0–0	4–3	3–1	3–0	—	2–2	3–1	3–3
Sligo Rovers	3–1	2–1	2–4	2–1	2–0	1–0	4–0	—	0–1	1–1
Transport	5–0	1–2	1–2	1–3	1–1	1–1	1–2	3–0	—	0–0
Waterford	4–1	2–2	4–3	5–2	4–3	2–2	1–1	6–3	2–2	—

Source: Extratime.ie
Legend: Blue = home team win; Yellow = draw; Red = away team win.

== Top scorers ==
Rank	Player	Club	Goals
1	Dessie Glynn	Drumcondra	20
2	Johnny Vaughan	Cork Athletic	14
3	Martin Colfer	Shelbourne	10
3	Pat Gallacher	Dundalk	10
3	George Gray	Sligo Rovers	10
6	Tommy Carberry	Shelbourne	9
7	Christy Boggan	Shamrock Rovers	8
7	Leo McDonagh	Dundalk	8
7	Joe Martin	Dundalk	8
10	Paddy Cronin	Cork Athletic	7
