= 1965–66 League of Ireland =

League of Ireland
- Season: 1965–66
- Champions: Waterford (1st Title)
- Matches played: 132
- Goals scored: 433 (3.28 per match)
- Top goalscorer: Mick Lynch Waterford 17

Statistics of League of Ireland in the 1965/1966 season.

== Overview ==
It was contested by 12 teams, and Waterford won the championship.

== Final classification ==
Pos	Team	Pld	W	D	L	GF	GA	GD	Pts
1	Waterford	22	16	4	2	53	26	+27	36
2	Shamrock Rovers	22	15	4	3	59	23	+36	34
3	Bohemians	22	13	1	8	46	30	+16	27
4	Shelbourne	22	10	5	7	37	30	+7	25
5	Sligo Rovers	22	8	7	7	26	26	0	23
6	Limerick	22	7	8	7	36	35	+1	22
7	Drumcondra	22	8	6	8	32	35	−3	22
8	Dundalk	22	9	3	10	32	35	−3	21
9	St Patrick's Athletic	22	9	2	11	35	43	−8	20
10	Cork Hibernians	22	6	3	13	30	51	−21	15
11	Cork Celtic	22	4	6	12	32	51	−19	14
12	Drogheda	22	1	3	18	15	48	−33	5

Source: www.rsssf.org

== Results ==
Home \ Away	BOH	CCF	CHF	DRO	DRU	DUN	LIM	SHM	SHE	SLI	StP	WAT
Bohemians	—	2–0	6–0	4–1	2–1	3–1	3–1	2–4	2–0	2–0	0–2	0–1
Cork Celtic	2–3	—	4–3	4–3	1–1	1–1	2–3	1–1	1–3	3–3	2–4	0–1
Cork Hibernians	3–2	1–1	—	3–2	0–0	3–0	0–2	0–2	0–3	2–1	0–3	0–0
Drogheda United	0–2	0–1	2–1	—	1–2	0–2	0–3	0–2	1–1	1–2	0–1	1–3
Drumcondra	3–1	1–3	2–1	0–0	—	1–2	2–1	0–3	1–0	0–1	2–0	2–3
Dundalk	1–0	4–1	3–6	4–0	0–2	—	0–2	0–2	2–0	2–0	2–1	0–1
Limerick	2–0	3–2	2–4	1–1	2–2	0–1	—	1–1	0–2	3–3	2–2	1–2
Shamrock Rovers	2–3	3–1	6–1	4–0	5–1	2–1	5–2	—	7–1	2–1	1–2	0–1
Shelbourne	2–0	5–0	2–0	2–1	4–2	1–1	1–1	1–1	—	0–1	0–1	3–5
Sligo Rovers	1–1	1–1	1–0	1–0	1–1	2–1	0–0	0–0	1–2	—	2–0	0–1
St Patrick's Athletic	3–4	1–0	2–1	2–0	1–3	4–4	1–3	1–2	1–3	1–3	—	2–6
Waterford	0–4	4–1	5–1	3–1	3–3	3–0	1–1	3–4	1–1	3–1	3–0	—

Legend: Blue = home team win; Yellow = draw; Red = away team win.

== Top scorers ==
Rank	Player	Club	Goals
1	Mick Lynch	Waterford	17
2	Shamie Coad	Waterford	14
2	Bobby Gilbert	Shamrock Rovers	14
2	Liam Tuohy	Shamrock Rovers	14
5	Tony Allen	Cork Hibernians	12
5	Frank O'Neill	Shamrock Rovers	12
7	Billy Dixon	Drumcondra	11
8	Eric Barber	Shelbourne	10
8	Joe O'Brien	Limerick	10
8	Ben O'Sullivan	Bohemians	10
