= 1964–65 League of Ireland =

League of Ireland
- Season: 1964–65
- Champions: Drumcondra (5th Title)
- Matches played: 132
- Goals scored: 396 (3 per match)
- Top goalscorer: Jackie Mooney - Shamrock Rovers 16

The 1964/1965 League of Ireland was contested by 12 teams, and Drumcondra won the championship.

== Final classification ==
Pos	Team	Pld	W	D	L	GF	GA	GD	Pts	Qualification
1	Drumcondra	22	14	4	4	35	22	+13	32	European Cup
2	Shamrock Rovers	22	14	3	5	40	22	+18	31	
3	Bohemians	22	10	7	5	38	24	+14	27	
4	Cork Hibernians	22	11	5	6	41	29	+12	27	
5	Sligo Rovers	22	10	5	7	30	31	−1	25	
6	Shelbourne	22	11	2	9	38	37	+1	24	
7	St Patrick's Athletic	22	9	3	10	37	36	+1	21	
8	Cork Celtic	22	8	3	11	33	34	−1	19	
9	Dundalk	22	7	5	10	31	37	−6	19	
10	Drogheda	22	5	5	12	19	34	−15	15	
11	Limerick	22	4	4	14	29	48	−19	12	Cup Winners Cup
12	Waterford	22	4	4	14	25	42	−17	12	

Source: www.rsssf.org

== Results ==
Home \ Away	BOH	CCF	CHF	DRO	DRU	DUN	LIM	SHM	SHE	SLI	StP	WAT
Bohemians	—	2–0	1–0	2–0	0–0	2–0	3–1	1–2	5–1	1–0	1–0	1–1
Cork Celtic	2–2	—	1–0	6–2	3–0	1–4	1–2	1–2	2–0	3–0	2–1	1–0
Cork Hibernians	1–0	1–0	—	4–0	1–2	3–3	3–1	2–0	3–0	2–2	2–0	5–3
Drogheda United	1–1	1–0	1–1	—	1–2	0–1	2–1	0–0	2–0	0–1	1–0	0–1
Drumcondra	2–2	3–0	2–0	3–1	—	3–1	2–1	2–0	2–1	2–0	1–0	2–1
Dundalk	3–3	1–0	1–2	1–3	1–2	—	2–1	1–1	1–2	1–0	0–1	2–0
Limerick	2–2	2–2	3–3	1–0	2–3	1–4	—	2–1	0–2	1–5	1–2	1–3
Shamrock Rovers	2–0	1–0	1–1	4–1	2–1	5–1	2–1	—	3–1	3–0	4–1	3–2
Shelbourne	2–0	3–0	2–3	1–1	2–1	1–1	2–1	3–1	—	0–2	6–2	3–2
Sligo Rovers	0–6	2–2	2–0	2–1	0–0	2–1	1–1	1–0	3–1	—	1–1	3–1
St Patrick's Athletic	4–1	3–6	2–1	1–0	3–0	1–1	2–2	0–1	2–3	4–0	—	5–1
Waterford	0–2	2–0	2–3	1–1	0–0	3–0	1–1	0–2	0–2	0–3	1–2	—

Legend: Blue = home team win; Yellow = draw; Red = away team win.

== Top scorers ==
Rank	Player	Club	Goals
1	Jackie Mooney	Shamrock Rovers	16
2	Eric Barber	Shelbourne	14
2	Noel Bates	St Patrick's Athletic	14
4	Joe McGrath	Dundalk	10
4	Austin Noonan	Cork Celtic	10
6	Jack Fitzgerald	Cork Hibernians	9
6	Ned Halpin	Drogheda	9
6	Johnny Kingston	Drumcondra	9
6	Peter Mitchell	Limerick	9
10	John McCole	Cork Hibernians	8
10	Turlough O'Connor	Bohemians	8
10	Donie Wallace	Cork Hibernians	8
