= Benny Henderson =

Irish footballer

Personal information
- Full name: Bernard Joseph Henderson
- Date of birth: c. 1926
- Date of death: 25 June 1993
- Position: Midfielder

Senior career*
Years	Team	Apps	(Gls)
1947–1949	Drumcondra		
1946, 1954	Dundalk		

International career
1948	Republic of Ireland	2	(0)
- * Club domestic league appearances and goals

Bernard Joseph "Benny" Henderson (c. 1926 – 1993) was an Irish soccer player. He played for Drumcondra and Dundalk at club level.

On 23 May 1948, he won his first senior cap for the Republic of Ireland national football team when he lined out on the left wing in a 2-0 defeat to Portugal in a friendly international played in Lisbon.

He played his only other senior international a week later in Barcelona when Ireland were beaten 2-1 by Spain in another friendly international.

== Sources ==
- Benny Henderson at WorldFootball.net
- Benny Henderson at EU-Football.info (archived)
- The Complete Who's Who of Irish International Football, 1945-96 (1996):Stephen McGarrigle
