= 1956–57 League of Ireland =

League of Ireland
- Season: 1956–57
- Champions: Shamrock Rovers (8th title)
- European Cup: Shamrock Rovers
- Matches played: 132
- Goals scored: 484 (3.67 per match)
- Top goalscorer: Tommy Hamilton; Donal Leahy (15 goals)
- Biggest home win: Waterford 10–2 Limerick
- Biggest away win: Limerick 1–6 Shelbourne F.C. Shelbourne 0–5 Evergreen United
- Highest scoring: Waterford 10–2 Limerick

The 1956–57 League of Ireland was the 36th season of senior football in the Republic of Ireland.

St Patrick's Athletic were the defending champions.

== Changes from 1955–56 season ==
No new teams were elected to the League.

== Teams ==
Locations of the 1954–55 League of Ireland teams

Team	Location	Stadium
Bohemians	Dublin (Phibsborough)	Dalymount Park
Cork Athletic	Cork (Mardyke)	Mardyke
Drumcondra	Dublin (Drumcondra)	Tolka Park
Dundalk	Dundalk	Oriel Park
Evergreen United	Cork (Turners Cross)	Turners Cross
Limerick	Limerick	Markets Field
Shamrock Rovers	Dublin (Milltown)	Glenmalure Park
Shelbourne	Dublin (Ringsend)	Shelbourne Park
Sligo Rovers	Sligo	The Showgrounds
St Patrick's Athletic	Dublin (Phibsborough)	Dalymount Park
Transport	Dublin (Harold's Cross)	Harold's Cross Stadium
Waterford	Waterford	Kilcohan Park

== Season overview ==
Shamrock Rovers won their eighth title and qualified for the following season's European Cup.

== Table ==
Pos	Team	Pld	W	D	L	GF	GA	GD	Pts	Qualification
1	Shamrock Rovers	22	15	6	1	68	24	+44	36	Qualification for European Cup preliminary round
2	Drumcondra	22	11	9	2	49	28	+21	31	
3	Sligo Rovers	22	11	7	4	42	29	+13	29	
4	Evergreen United	22	11	5	6	48	31	+17	27	
5	Transport	22	8	10	4	42	36	+6	26	
6	Shelbourne	22	10	6	6	47	39	+8	24 (Note: Shelbourne were deducted two points by the League.)	
7	Waterford	22	9	4	9	49	41	+8	22	
8	Cork Athletic	22	5	8	9	32	46	−14	18	Resigned
9	St Patrick's Athletic	22	6	5	11	33	55	−22	17	
10	Dundalk	22	4	8	10	33	40	−7	16	
11	Bohemians	22	2	5	15	20	56	−36	9	
12	Limerick	22	2	3	17	21	59	−38	7	

Source: RSSSF, foot.dk

== Results ==
Home \ Away	BOH	CAT	DRU	DUN	EVE	LIM	SHM	SHE	SLI	STP	TRA	WAT
Bohemians	—	3–0	0–3	0–0	1–0	0–2	1–4	0–1	1–4	0–3	2–2	1–3
Cork Athletic	2–1	—	3–3	1–0	2–4	2–0	4–3	1–3	3–3	0–2	1–3	1–1
Drumcondra	1–0	4–2	—	5–1	1–1	4–1	1–1	2–2	0–0	3–0	4–1	3–1
Dundalk	4–2	1–1	2–2	—	4–1	0–1	1–2	2–2	0–1	1–2	2–2	2–0
Evergreen United	4–1	2–0	2–2	2–1	—	1–1	1–2	2–1	1–0	4–0	2–3	2–2
Limerick	2–2	0–2	0–1	2–3	0–2	—	1–1	1–6	0–2	2–3	2–3	1–2
Shamrock Rovers	6–0	5–1	5–0	3–1	4–1	3–0	—	2–2	3–1	4–0	1–0	1–1
Shelbourne	3–0	2–2	2–2	2–1	0–5	1–0	2–5	—	3–0	6–1	1–1	1–0
Sligo Rovers	5–0	2–0	0–4	3–3	1–1	2–0	2–2	3–0	—	4–2	2–2	2–1
St Patrick's Athletic	3–3	1–1	1–2	1–1	2–5	3–2	1–6	1–2	2–2	—	0–2	3–1
Transport	1–1	2–2	1–1	2–2	2–1	6–1	0–0	5–4	0–1	0–0	—	3–2
Waterford	3–1	1–1	2–1	3–1	1–4	10–2	3–5	3–1	1–2	4–2	4–1	—

Source: Extratime.com
Legend: Blue = home team win; Yellow = draw; Red = away team win.

== Top scorers ==
Rank	Player	Club	Goals
1	Tommy Hamilton	Shamrock Rovers	15
1	Donal Leahy	Evergreen United	15
3	Austin Noonan	Evergreen United	13
4	Jack Fitzgerald	Waterford	12
4	Dessie Glynn	Shelbourne	12
6	Willie Coleman	Drumcondra	11
6	Tommy Collins	Cork Athletic	11
6	Vincent Morrison	Sligo Rovers	11
9	Jackie McCourt	Drumcondra	10
9	Jack Walsh	Sligo Rovers	10
