= Kit Lawlor =

Irish footballer

Personal information
- Full name: John Lawlor
- Date of birth: 3 December 1922
- Place of birth: Dublin, Ireland
- Date of death: 8 June 2004 (aged 81)
- Position: Forward

Senior career*
| Years | Team | Apps | (Gls) |
| 1945–1946 | Shamrock Rovers | ? | (0) |
| 1946–1950 | Drumcondra | 61 | (31) |
| 1950–1954 | Doncaster Rovers | 128 | (46) |
| 1954–1955 | Ballymena United | ? | (?) |
| 1955–1959 | Drumcondra | 47 | (20) |
| 1959–1960 | Dundalk | 19 | (5) |
| 1960–1961 | Worcester City | 3 | (0) |

International career
| 1949–1951 | Republic of Ireland | 3 | (0) |
- * Club domestic league appearances and goals

John Christopher Lawlor (3 December 1922 – 8 June 2004) was an Irish professional footballer.

== Career ==
His League of Ireland playing career began with Shamrock Rovers. After spending just one season at Glenmalure Park, Lawlor moved to Drumcondra and in only his second campaign with the club, he helped them to the league championship. He was then signed by Peter Doherty for Doncaster Rovers in June 1950, playing five full seasons for them in the old Second Division, scoring 46 goals in 128 appearances.

After almost five years in England he returned home to sign for Ballymena United in December 1954. Dublin to resume his career with Drumcondra. In 1957, Lawlor was part of the Drumcondra side that caused a major shock by defeating Shamrock Rovers in the Cup final and the following year, the club won the league title. He finished his career with Dundalk moving there in 1959 at the age of 37.

He won three full Irish caps. His son Mick Lawlor also played for his country in the 1970s and is now kit manager for Ireland. Both Mick and another son Robbie also played for Rovers.
