= Freddie Hutchinson =

Association football player

Personal information
- Full name: Frederick Armstrong Hutchison
- Date of birth: 10 September 1912
- Place of birth: Dublin, Ireland
- Date of death: 15 September 1973 (aged 61)
- Place of death: Dublin, Ireland
- Position: Wing half

Senior career*
Years	Team	Apps	(Gls)
- Drumcondra

International career
1935	Republic of Ireland	2	(0)
- * Club domestic league appearances and goals

Frederick Armstrong Hutchison (1912–1973) was an Irish footballer who played with Drumcondra in the 1930s and made two appearances for the Republic of Ireland national team.

Hutchinson was capped twice for the Republic of Ireland at senior level winning both caps in May 1935 in away friendlies versus Switzerland and Germany.
