= Tim Coffey =

Irish footballer

Personal information
- Full name: Timothy Alfred Coffey
- Date of birth: 20 February 1928
- Place of birth: Dublin, Ireland
- Date of death: 8 November 1999 (aged 71)
- Position: Defender

Senior career*
Years	Team	Apps	(Gls)
- Drumcondra

International career
1949	Republic of Ireland	1	(0)
- * Club domestic league appearances and goals

Timothy Alfred Coffey (20 February 1928 – 8 November 1999) was an Irish soccer player.

He played for Drumcondra at club level and was a great favourite with the Drumcondra fans in the 1940s and 1950s. A wing-half, he won a League of Ireland winners medal in 1948/49 and a FAI Cup winners medal in 1954.

On 9 October 1949, he won his only senior cap for the Republic of Ireland national football team when he lined out in defence in a 1–1 draw with Finland in a World Cup qualification tie played in Helsinki. Coffey laid on the opening goal for Irish skipper Peter Farrell. He also represented the League of Ireland.

== Honours ==
- League of Ireland: 1
  - Drumcondra 1948/49
- FAI Cup: 1
  - Drumcondra 1954
