= Alan Kelly Sr. =

Irish footballer and manager

Alan Kelly
Personal information
- Full name: Alan James Alexander Kelly
- Date of birth: 5 July 1936
- Place of birth: Bray, Ireland
- Date of death: 20 May 2009 (aged 72)
- Place of death: Rockville, Maryland, United States
- Position: Goalkeeper

Senior career*
Years	Team	Apps	(Gls)
–1956	Bray Wanderers		
1956–1958	Drumcondra		
1958–1973	Preston North End	447	(0)

International career
1956–1973	Republic of Ireland	47	(0)

Managerial career
- 1980: Republic of Ireland (caretaker)
- 1981: Preston North End (caretaker)
- 1983–1985: Preston North End
- * Club domestic league appearances and goals

Alan James Alexander Kelly (5 July 1936 – 20 May 2009) was an Irish football player and coach.

Kelly played as a goalkeeper for Bray Wanderers and Drumcondra in his home country, and most notably for Preston North End in England. He was capped 47 times for the Republic of Ireland. He was the father of Gary Kelly and Alan Kelly Jr., who also became goalkeepers.

== Playing career ==
Kelly started his career at Bray Wanderers. In 1956, he joined Drumcondra, with whom he had won a FAI Cup winners medal in 1957 and a League Championship in 1958. In 1960, he moved to Preston North End.

Kelly won the first of his 47 Republic of Ireland caps against West Germany in a 1956 friendly, and won his second cap the following year in a World Cup qualifier against England.

He made his Preston debut on 28 January 1961, in an FA Cup tie against Swansea Town and became first choice goalkeeper the following season. In total, he made a club record 513 appearances over a 14-year period – including the 1964 FA Cup Final defeat by West Ham United. West Ham's second goal was unfortunate for Kelly because a header from Geoff Hurst hit the crossbar and bounced down before deflecting in off the back of Kelly's head. In league competition, he played 447 times for Preston, keeping 126 clean sheets, which is a club record.

Kelly was named Preston's inaugural Player of the Year in 1966–67, and again in 1967–68. He won a Third Division championship medal in 1970–71. A shoulder injury ended his career in 1973 – his final game being against Bristol City on 15 September 1973. He was given a testimonial match against Stoke City on 19 November 1974; Stoke won 2–1.

== Management career and later life ==
Following his retirement, Kelly joined North End's coaching staff and was promoted to assistant manager under Nobby Stiles in 1977. In 1980, he briefly managed the Republic of Ireland side, presiding over one match against Switzerland. In 1983, he was appointed manager of Preston North End. Following a bad run of results over the Christmas period he resigned in February 1985.

In 1985–86, his son Alan Kelly Jr. followed in his father's footsteps when he made his debut in goal for Preston. The younger Kelly later also played in goal for the Republic of Ireland, winning 34 caps. Kelly's oldest son David who played amateur football his second son Gary was also a goalkeeper. He was never capped at senior level, but enjoyed a lengthy career playing for Newcastle United, Bury and Oldham Athletic.

Kelly was goalkeeping coach for Major League Soccer side D.C. United for five seasons.

In 2001, the third part of Deepdale's redevelopment was named the Alan Kelly Town End in honour of their former player and manager.

Kelly spent the final years of his life in Rockville, Maryland, United States, and died on 20 May 2009 after battling colon cancer for a number of years.

== Honours ==
Drumcondra

- League of Ireland: 1957–58
- FAI Cup: 1957

Preston North End

- Football League Third Division: 1970–71
- FA Cup runner-up: 1963–64

Individual

- Preston North End Player of the Year: 1966–67, 1967–68
