= Jimmy Lawlor =

Irish footballer (1933–2012)

Personal information
- Full name: James Joseph Lawlor
- Date of birth: 10 May 1933
- Place of birth: Finglas Bridge, Dublin, Ireland
- Date of death: 5 April 2012 (aged 78)
- Place of death: Bradford, England
- Position: Centre half

Senior career*
Years	Team	Apps	(Gls)
- Transport
- Shamrock Rovers
- Drumcondra
1952–1955	Doncaster Rovers	9	(0)
1955–1957	Coleraine		
1957–1962	Bradford City	153	(5)
Total		162+	(5+)
- * Club domestic league appearances and goals

James Joseph Lawlor (10 May 1933 – 5 April 2012), also known as Jimmy Lawlor or Jim Lawlor, was an Irish professional footballer who played in both Ireland and England as a centre half.

== Career ==
Born in Finglas Bridge, Dublin, Ireland, Lawlor spent his early career with Transport, Shamrock Rovers and Drumcondra. In August 1952, he was signed for English club Doncaster Rovers by manager Peter Doherty. He made his debut for Doncaster on 16 October 1954 in a 5–1 defeat against Lincoln City, and made a total of nine appearances in the Football League for Doncaster during the 1954–55 season. He also scored two goals in a friendly match against Scottish club Celtic on 18 November 1952. After leaving Doncaster, Lawlor had a spell in Northern Ireland with Coleraine, before signing with English club Bradford City in March 1957. After scoring five goals in 153 appearances in the Football League for them, and 176 appearances in all competitions, Lawlor retired at the age of 28 in 1962, due to a broken leg injury.

== Later life and death ==
Lawlor died on 5 April 2012, at the age of 78, following a period of illness.
