= Harry McLoughlin =

Irish footballer

Personal information
- Full name: Harold McLoughlin
- Date of birth: 1956 (age 69–70)
- Place of birth: Sligo, Ireland
- Position: Winger

Senior career*
Years	Team	Apps	(Gls)
1977–1989	Sligo Rovers	315	(35)
1989–1990	Finn Harps	14	(1)
1989–1990	Longford Town	9	(0)
- * Club domestic league appearances and goals

Harry McLoughlin (born 1956) is an Irish former footballer who played as a winger. Primarily associated with Sligo Rovers, he also had stints with Finn Harps and Longford Town later in his career.

== Career ==
McLoughlin was born in Sligo. Originally from the Forthill area of Sligo, he played his early football with the now defunct Boys Club on O'Connell Street in the town. McLoughlin, who typically played on the wing, joined Sligo Rovers in the summer of 1977. He made his League of Ireland debut for the club, on 9 October 1977, during an away match against Shamrock Rovers at Glenmalure Park. During his debut season, McLoughlin was seen as the club's replacement for Paul McGee, who had just signed for Queens Park Rangers in England.

On 6 March 1983, Sligo Rovers defeated Shamrock Rovers in the FAI Cup quarter final. McLoughlin scored the first goal, in a 2-1 win, with a "blistering shot" taken on the half-volley from a cross by Martin McDonnell. Sligo Rovers, who defeated Cobh Ramblers in a replayed semi-final, went on to defeat Bohemians in the 1983 FAI Cup Final, with McLoughlin scoring the winning goal.

During the 1985–86 League of Ireland First Division, he scored 11 goals to finish as the league's joint-top goalscorer, tied with Finn Harps's Con McLoughlin. Overall, McLoughlin made 315 appearances for Sligo Rovers, scoring just short of fifty goals for the club.

In May 1989, he was released by the new Sligo Rovers manager Dermot Keely. In June 1989, McLoughlin signed for Finn Harps, before later signing for Longford Town.

In November 2011, at a ceremony held during the 2011 FAI Cup final, McLoughlin was "honoured as an FAI cup legend".

McLoughlin's nephew, Alan Cawley, was also a footballer.

== Honours ==
Sligo Rovers

- FAI Cup: 1983
