= James F. Lawler =

American politician

Jim Lawler

Member of the South Dakota Senate from the 3rd district
- In office 1993–2000
- Preceded by: William R. Taylor
- Succeeded by: Elmer Diedtrich

Personal details
- Born: December 14, 1935 (age 90) Howard, South Dakota
- Party: Democratic
- Spouse: Christine
- Profession: scientist, environmental sanitarian

James F. Lawler (born December 14, 1935) is an American former politician. He served in the South Dakota Senate from 1993 to 2000.
