= Billy Behan =

Irish footballer and manager

Personal information
- Full name: William Behan
- Date of birth: 8 August 1911
- Place of birth: Dublin, Ireland
- Date of death: 12 November 1991 (aged 80)
- Position: Goalkeeper

Senior career*
Years	Team	Apps	(Gls)
1930–1931	Shamrock Rovers	?	(?)
1931–1933	Shelbourne	?	(?)
1933–1934	Manchester United	1	(0)
1934	Shelbourne	?	(?)
1934–1936	Shamrock Rovers	?	(?)

Managerial career
- 1953–1954: Drumcondra
- * Club domestic league appearances and goals

William Behan (8 August 1911 – 12 November 1991) was an Irish footballer who played as a goalkeeper for Shelbourne, Shamrock Rovers and Manchester United during the 1930s.

He made his Rovers debut on 8 February 1931 in a 5–1 win over Bray Unknowns at Milltown. In his first season, he won the FAI Cup.

Behan signed for Manchester United from Shelbourne in September 1933. Along with fellow Irishman David Byrne, the two men became the first players from the south of Ireland to play for the club in over a decade. Behan made his United debut in an English Second Division home game against Bury on 3 March 1934. The following July, he briefly returned to Shelbourne before again returning to Rovers. Over the next two seasons, he won another FAI Cup and a League of Ireland Shield. His last game for the Hoops was on 23 August 1936 in a Shield win over Drumcondra.

After his retirement as a player, Behan became a referee and officiated the 1943 FAI Cup final. He moved into management in 1946, starting with St Patrick's C.Y.M.S. in Ringsend. Behan then managed Drumcondra in the 1950s where he won the FAI Cup again.

Behan subsequently became United's chief scout in the Republic of Ireland and is credited with discovering, among others, Johnny Carey, Liam Whelan, Tony Dunne, Don Givens, Kevin Moran and Paul McGrath. He also attempted to organise a trial for future Irish rugby international, Tony Ward. In addition, Began served as vice chairman of the Dalkey-based Leinster Senior League team, Dalkey United and it was through this association that he discovered McGrath.

Behan's father, William Sr., was one of the founder members of Shamrock Rovers. His brothers John and Paddy also played for Rovers. His son kept goal for Rovers side also for a spell. His second cousin was Bob Fullam. Behan died on 12 November 1991.

== Honours ==
=== As a player ===
Shamrock Rovers

- FAI Cup (2): 1931, 1936
- League of Ireland Shield (1): 1934–35

=== As a manager ===
Drumcondra

- FAI Cup (1): 1954

== Sources ==
- McGrath, Paul; Hogan, Vincent (2006), Back From the Brink, Arrow, ISBN 978-0-09-949955-8
- The Boys In Green – The FAI International Story (1997): Sean Ryan
- The Hoops by Paul Doolan and Robert Goggins (ISBN 0-7171-2121-6)
