= Liam Coll =

Irish soccer player (born 1929)

Personal information
- Full name: William Sean Coll
- Date of birth: 16 December 1929 (age 96)
- Place of birth: Carrickmacross, Ireland
- Position: Right winger

Senior career*
Years	Team	Apps	(Gls)
1949–1951	Accrington Stanley	13	(0)
1951–1953	Sligo Rovers		(24)
1953–1955	Ballymena United		
1954	→ Doncaster Rovers (trial)	0	(0)
1955–1957	Chelmsford City		
1957	Bedford Town	2	(0)
1957–?	Ards		
- * Club domestic league appearances and goals

William Sean Coll (born 16 December 1929) is an Irish former footballer who played as a right winger.

== Career ==
Coll began his career at Accrington Stanley, making 13 Football League appearances during his time at the club. After leaving Accrington, Coll signed for Sligo Rovers in 1951. Coll scored 24 League of Ireland goals for the club, before departing to sign for Ballymena United. Following his spell at Ballymena, Coll played for Doncaster Rovers, Chelmsford City, Bedford Town and Ards.
