= Jack Fitzgerald (footballer) =

Irish footballer

Personal information
- Full name: Jack Fitzgerald
- Date of birth: 3 April 1930
- Place of birth: Waterford, Ireland
- Date of death: 23 November 2003 (aged 73)
- Position: Forward

Youth career
- –1949: Waterford Bohemians

Senior career*
Years	Team	Apps	(Gls)
1949–1950	Waterford	?	(0)
1951–1964	Waterford	?	(121)
1964–1965	Cork Hibernians	20	(9)
Total		?	(130)

International career
1955–1956	Republic of Ireland	2	(1)
	League of Ireland XI	?	(?)
- * Club domestic league appearances and goals

Jack Fitzgerald (3 April 1930 – 23 November 2003) was an Irish professional footballer.

Fitzgerald was the Golden Boy of Waterford football during the Fifties. Jack was one of six brothers who played in the League of Ireland for the Blues - Denny, Tom, Ned, Peter Fitzgerald (footballer) and Paul were the others. Their father, Michael, was a native of Durrow and a hurler, only becoming involved with football through his sons. However, he subsequently was elected chairman of Waterford and became an international selector in the early 1960s.

Fitzgerald had started his career as a right half at Waterford Bohemians and along with his brother Denny was in the squad that won the FAI Youth Cup in 1947.

== Debut ==
After making his League of Ireland debut in the 1949-50 League of Ireland season he spent the following season working in England. When he returned for the 1951-52 League of Ireland season, player-manager Jimmy Nelson switched him to centre-forward during an injury crisis. Jack responded with a couple of goals and his career took off from there.

He was noted for his pace and ability to score with both his head and feet while playing in the penalty area. His height and physical presence made him a difficult opponent for defenders, and he was also recognized for his work rate and persistence in challenging for the ball.

He won amateur caps, full international caps and inter-League honours, but fitting football in with his work as a milk delivery man wasn't easy. Yet, when he got the chance to move to England, he turned it down. First in with an offer was Matt Busby in October 1953. The fee was £8,000 but an inopportune cartilage operation put an end to that. Shortly after he signed professional for Waterford.

== At Waterford ==
The following season Jack's partnership with the ill-starred Scot Jimmy Gauld, who was later to be jailed for the 1964 match-fixing scandal in England, caught the public's imagination and set attendance records around the country. This brought Jack back into the limelight and he scored the winning goal against Netherlands national football team in Dalymount Park, which seemed to presage a lengthy international career. However, he then broke his ankle playing against the Hessen League in Germany. That didn't stop Sunderland pursuing him, the chairman even visiting him in hospital seeking his signature and inviting Jack and his wife over to do some house-hunting. Jack declined, citing as his excuse that he was a bad traveller.

A hat-trick in the return game against the Hessen League in Dalymount earned him a recall to the international team. Holland were the opposition again and Jack contributed handsomely to a famous 4–1 win in Rotterdam. Such was the Dutch dismay at this football lesson from the Irish that they switched from amateur to professional football as a result.

Despite being such crowd-pleasers, that Waterford team just missed out on the honours, twice being pipped for the League title and losing the 1959 FAI Cup final to St Patrick's Athletic after a replay. By 1964 the tide had turned and they had to apply for re-election. At the end of that season a note was pushed under Jack's front door telling him he was being released. After 16 years with Waterford, that was the only sour note - the fact that none of the directors had the courtesy to call on him and tell him personally that he was surplus to requirements.

He signed for Cork Hibernians and enjoyed one good season, finishing top scorer, before work commitments forced him to quit. At the end of the 2013 League of Ireland season Fitzgerald is joint seventeenth in the all-time League of Ireland goalscoring list with 130 league goals

== Sources ==
- The Book of Irish Goalscorers by Seán Ryan & Stephen Burke 1987
