= Drumcondra F.C. =

- Full name: Drumcondra Football Club
- Nickname: The Drums
- Founded: 1923; 103 years ago
- Ground: Clonturk Park; Tolka Park (1928–1972); Morton Stadium (2001–2019); Baskin Lane (2019–present)
- Capacity: 400
- League: League of Ireland; Leinster Senior League; Amateur Football League; North Dublin Schoolboys/Girls League; Dublin & District Schoolboys League
- Website: drumcondrafc.com
Home colours

Drumcondra Football Club is an Irish association football club based in Drumcondra, Dublin.

Once one of the most successful clubs in Ireland in the 1940s, 1950s and 1960s, with a strong rivalry with Shamrock Rovers since the 1920s, they fell into obscurity since their financial and organisational troubles began in 1969. After numerous name changes, revivals, mergers, splits and relocations, the club is now an amateur one with a large membership of both senior and youth players.

Currently their senior team play in the Leinster Senior League Senior Division 1A. They also field a team in the league's Major 1B Saturday Division.

== History ==
=== Foundation ===
Drumcondra F.C.'s heritage goes back to the late nineteenth century, using variations of the name Drumcondra A.F.C, and Drumcondra Botanic (when they began to play in 1901 on Botanic Road where Santry RFC used to play). Drumcondra's won the Leinster Junior League in 1899 and the Leinster Junior Shield Winners 1911–12. Early figures in the club's history included former player and club honorary secretary Larry Sheridan (who served as chairman and honorary secretary of the Football Association of Ireland (FAI), as well as honorary secretary of the League of Ireland) and Jack A. Ryder (who served as Secretary of the LFA and the FAI). The club lapse during the great war and was refounded in 1924.

=== Prominence ===
Drumcondra came to national prominence, in 1926–27, while playing in the Leinster Senior League and with a team that included Joe Grace and Johnny Murray, Drums won the inaugural FAI Qualifying Cup, later known as the FAI Intermediate Cup, beating Cobh Ramblers in the final. This win enabled them to compete in the FAI Cup where Drumcondra made it to the final against Brideville. After the first game finished in a 1–1 draw, the Drums beat Brideville in the replay at Shelbourne Park to win the 1926–27 FAI Cup and complete a cup double. In 1927–28 Drums won the Leinster Senior League and also reached the 1927–28 FAI Cup final.

=== League of Ireland ===
In 1928–29 Drumcondra made their League of Ireland debut and finished a respectable fourth in their first season. However Drums would have to wait until the late 1940s before they won their first league title. Then with a team that included, among others, Benny Henderson, Dessie Glynn, Chris Giles, Kevin Clarke, Kit Lawlor and Tim Coffey, they won two in a row in 1947–48 and 1948–49.

In 1953 Sam Prole, a wealthy man from Dundalk who had made his money from the Great Northern Railway, bought Drumcondra from the Hunter family. Prole introduced pitch-side advertising and in 1953 installed floodlights at Tolka Park. As a result, Drumcondra became the first League of Ireland club to have floodlights.

Chart of yearly table positions for Drumcondra in League of Ireland

=== Rivalry with Shamrock Rovers ===
During their time in the League of Ireland Drumcondra enjoyed a strong rivalry with Shamrock Rovers. In 1928–29 when Drums made their League of Ireland debut, their first opponents were Rovers. This first meeting between Drums and Rovers ended in a 1–1 draw. During the 1940s and 1950s large crowds gathered to see the Northside/Southside derby fixtures between the two clubs. During this time Drumcondra played Rovers in four FAI Cup finals in 1946, 1948, 1955 and 1957. The two clubs shared the honours, winning two finals each. In 1946 with a team that featured Con Martin, Robin Lawler, Kevin Clarke and Jimmy Lawlor, Drums won their third FAI Cup final after defeating Rovers 2–1 with goals from Tommy McCormack and Benny Henderson. The rivalry reached its peak during the late 1950s. At the time Drums squad included, among others, Alan Kelly, John O'Neill and Kit Lawlor. The 1956–57 season saw Rovers win the League of Ireland title, while Drums finished second. The opening game of the League of Ireland season saw the two teams meet at Tolka Park. The venue was packed to capacity with a crowd of 15,000. Rovers defeated Drums 2–0 in the Leinster Senior Cup final and then won the Dublin City Cup final on corners. However Drums defeated Rovers 2–0 in the 1956–57 FAI Cup final, thanks to goals from Bunny Fullam and Willie Coleman, and then 3–0 in the semi-final of the Top Four Cup a week later. A crowd of 20,000 turned up on 26 December 1956 to watch the Leinster Senior Cup final. The FAI Cup final on 28 April 1957 saw an attendance of 30,000 while the Top Four semi-final on 5 May 1957 was watched by 16,845. All three games were played at Dalymount Park. The rivalry continued into the 1957–58 season with Rovers and Drums meeting in the finals of the Leinster Senior Cup, the Top Four Cup, the Dublin City Cup and the LFA President's Cup. Rovers won all four. However Drums did finish the season as League of Ireland champions, finishing two points clear of second placed Rovers. Drums and Rovers games continued to attract large crowds and on occasions this created some issues. On 26 January 1958 the first-ever all ticket League of Ireland game between Drums and Rovers had to be abandoned, after sixty-five minutes, after thousands of ticketless fans forced their way into an already packed Tolka Park. This in turn led to crowd encroachment on the pitch. Rovers were leading 2–1 at the time and the result was allowed to stand. In 1964–65 when Drums won their fifth League of Ireland title they finished one point clear of runners-up Rovers.

=== Merging with Home Farm ===
In the late 1960s Drumcondra went into decline. In both 1969–70 and 1970–71 Drums finished last place in the league. They were also £6,000 in debt. At the end of the 1971–72 season the team was effectively taken over by Home Farm when, after almost twenty years in charge, Sam Prole agreed to sell the club. Drums final league game in their own right was a 1–1 draw with Shelbourne at Tolka Park on 5 April 1972. It was announced by Brendan Menton Snr, Home Farm honorary secretary, that the amateur club had taken over the entire share capital of their professional neighbouring club. During the 1972–73 season the side played as Home Farm-Drumcondra, however within a season the Drumcondra name was dropped and from the start of 1973–74 the side simply became Home Farm. Sam Prole subsequently became involved with Dundalk F.C. and a number of former Drumcondra players including Shay Noonan, Johnny Robinson, Willie Coleman, Ned Halpin and Tommy Rowe joined him at the Oriel Park club.

=== Revival ===
Drumcondra F.C. was reformed in the mid-1970s, not long after the demise of the original club. However, by the early 2000s they had relocated to Santry, playing their home games at Morton Stadium. They reached the third round of the 2004 FAI Cup but lost 5–0 to UCD. Over the years there were a number of amalgamations with local clubs coming under the Drumcondra F.C. banner, the most significant of which was with Drumcondra Athletic a club formed in the early 1990s who went on to also achieve LSL Intermediate status prior to amalgamating with Drumcondra F.C.

== Statistics ==
=== Season placings ===
- 1928–29 – 4
- 1929–30 – 7
- 1930–31 – 11
- 1931–32 – 9
- 1932–33 – 10
- 1933–34 – 7
- 1934–35 – 9
- 1935–36 – 9
- 1936–37 – 6
- 1937–38 – 12
- 1938–39 – 8
- 1939–40 – 6
- 1940–41 – 6
- 1941–42 – 9
- 1942–43 – 3
- 1943–44 – 6
- 1944–45 – 4
- 1945–46 – 2
- 1946–47 – 2
- 1947–48 – 1
- 1948–49 – 1
- 1949–50 – 2
- 1950–51 – 3
- 1951–52 – 6
- 1952–53 – 2
- 1953–54 – 3
- 1954–55 – 6
- 1955–56 – 8
- 1956–57 – 2
- 1957–58 – 1
- 1958–59 – 5
- 1959–60 – 9
- 1960–61 – 1
- 1961–62 – 7
- 1962–63 – 3
- 1963–64 – 8
- 1964–65 – 1
- 1965–66 – 7
- 1966–67 – 8
- 1967–68 – 7
- 1968–69 – 9
- 1969–70 – 14
- 1970–71 – 14
- 1971–72 – 12

=== Records ===
Stat	Opponent	Score	Competition	Date
Biggest League Win	Sligo Rovers	8–0	1960–61 League of Ireland	22 January 1961
Biggest League Defeat	Cork United	1–9	1945–46 League of Ireland	13 January 1946

== European record ==
Drumcondra qualified for European football on five occasions during the late 1950s and early 1960s. They made their home European debut on 1 October 1958 in a European Cup against Atlético Madrid at Dalymount Park. They had already lost the away leg 8–0 and would subsequently lose the home leg 5–1. The highlight of their European adventures came in the 1962–63 Inter-Cities Fairs Cup. Drums became the first League of Ireland side to register an aggregate win in European competition when they knocked out an Odense XI in the first round. In the second round they were beaten 6–0 away by Bayern Munich in the first leg. However, in the return game they earned a 1–0 win with Billy Dixon scoring the winning goal.

=== Overview ===
Competition	Matches	W	D	L	GF	GA
European Cup	6	1	0	5	3	25
Inter-Cities Fairs Cup	6	2	0	4	8	20
TOTAL	12	3	0	9	11	45

=== Matches ===
Season	Competition	Round	Opponent	Home	Away	Aggregate
1958–59	European Cup	PR	(Spain) Atlético Madrid	1–5	0–8	1–13
1961–62	European Cup	PR	(West Germany) Nürnberg	1–4	0–5	1–9
1962–63	Inter-Cities Fairs Cup	1R	(Denmark) Odense XI	4–1	2–4	6–5
1962–63	Inter-Cities Fairs Cup	2R	(West Germany) Bayern Munich	1–0	0–6	1–7
1965–66	European Cup	PR	(West Germany) Vorwärts Berlin	1–0	0–3	1–3
1966–67	Inter-Cities Fairs Cup	PR	(West Germany) Eintracht Frankfurt	0–2	1–6	1–8

== Home grounds ==
During their time in the League of Ireland, Drumcondra played their home games at Tolka Park. In more recent seasons they have played at Morton Stadium. They currently play at their new base in Baskin Lane, North County Dublin, which they moved to in advance of the 2019/20 LSL season.

== Team colours ==
Drumcondra's colours are essentially gold/yellow and royal blue. In their later seasons in the League of Ireland, and certainly during the 1968–69 season, they also played in an All sky blue strip. At various times they wore blue/gold hoops with white shorts before adopting a more modern European style gold with a blue v-neck and blue shorts in 1954.

== Notable former players ==
Dual Ireland internationals

- (Ireland) (Republic of Ireland) Tom Davis
- (Ireland) (Republic of Ireland) Peter Kavanagh
- (Ireland) (Republic of Ireland) Con Martin

Republic of Ireland internationals

Johnny Murray represented Ireland at the 1924 Summer Olympics In 1926, Joe Grace became the first player to represent Ireland while playing for Drumcondra. The club were still playing in the Leinster Senior League at the time. In the 1930s Paddy Byrne, Tommy Donnelly, Freddie Hutchinson and Paddy Meehan also represented Ireland while playing for Drumcondra. After the Second World War, Tim Coffey, Dessie Glynn, Benny Henderson, Alan Kelly and Fran Brennan were added to this list.

- (Republic of Ireland) Paddy Andrews
- (Republic of Ireland) Fran Brennan
- (Republic of Ireland) Paddy Byrne
- (Republic of Ireland) Kevin Clarke
- (Republic of Ireland) Tim Coffey
- (Republic of Ireland) Tommy Donnelly
- (Republic of Ireland) Bobby Duffy
- (Republic of Ireland) Amby Fogarty
- (Republic of Ireland) Bobby Gilbert
- (Republic of Ireland) Chris Giles
- (Republic of Ireland) Dessie Glynn
- (Republic of Ireland) Joe Grace
- (Republic of Ireland) Eoin Hand
- (Republic of Ireland) Joe Haverty
- (Republic of Ireland) Benny Henderson
- (Republic of Ireland) Freddie Hutchinson
- (Republic of Ireland) Alan Kelly
- (Republic of Ireland) Fred Kiernan
- (Republic of Ireland) Kit Lawlor
- (Republic of Ireland) Robin Lawler
- (Republic of Ireland) Maxie McCann
- (Republic of Ireland) Paddy Meehan
- (Republic of Ireland) Johnny Murray
- (Republic of Ireland) Lar O'Byrne
- (Republic of Ireland) John O'Neill
- (Republic of Ireland) Mick Smyth
- (Republic of Ireland) Maurice Swan
- (Republic of Ireland) Fran Watters

League of Ireland XI representative

- (Republic of Ireland) Mick Cahill
- (Republic of Ireland) Olly Lyons
- (Republic of Ireland) Eamonn Darcy
- (Republic of Ireland) Billy Dixon

Ireland (IFA) internationals

- (Ireland) Tucker Croft
- (Ireland) Billy Millar

Scotland internationals

- (Scotland) Alex James
- (Scotland) Alex Parker
- (Scotland) Gordon Smith

Goalscorers

On three occasions Drumcondra players finished as the League of Ireland Top Scorer.

- Dessie Glynn: 1950–51 – 20
- Dan McCaffrey: 1960–61 – 29

== Notable former managers ==
- (Republic of Ireland) Billy Behan
- (Republic of Ireland) Christy Giles
- (Republic of Ireland) Amby Fogarty

== Honours ==
- League of Ireland: 5
  - 1947–48, 1948–49, 1957–58, 1960–61, 1964–65
- FAI Cup: 5
  - 1926–27, 1942–43, 1945–46, 1953–54, 1956–57
- League of Ireland Shield: 4
  - 1945–46, 1946–47, 1950–51, 1961–62
- LFA President's Cup: 7
  - 1946–47, 1947–48, 1949–50, 1950–51, 1958–59, 1961–62, 1966–67
- Dublin City Cup: 6
  - 1939–40, 1940–41, 1949–50, 1950–51, 1951–52, 1960–61
- PJ Casey Cup: 1
  - 1962–63
- Leinster Senior League: 4
  - 1927–28, 1928–29, 1945–46, 1951–52
- Leinster Senior Cup: 11
  - 1933–34, 1935–36, 1938–39, 1942–43, 1943–44, 1944–45, 1949–50, 1953–54, 1958–59, 1959–60, 1961–62
- FAI Intermediate Cup: 2
  - 1926–27, 1946–47
- FAI Junior Cup: 2
  - 1938–39, 1939–40
