= Kilcohan Park =

Greyhound racing stadium in Waterford, Ireland

Kilcohan Park Greyhound Stadium
- Interactive map of Kilcohan Park Greyhound Stadium
- Location: Old Tramore Road, Waterford, Ireland
- Coordinates: 52.243074°N 7.112086°W
- Operated by: Greyhound Racing Ireland
- Date opened: 2 Nov 1930 (for football); 26 Dec 1934 (for unlicensed racing); May 1947 (for licensed racing)
- Race type: greyhound racing

Kilcohan Park Greyhound Stadium is a greyhound racing track and former soccer stadium located in the south of Waterford, Ireland.

== Operations ==
Racing takes place every Friday and Saturday evening. Race distances are 325, 525, 550, 575 and 731 yards and the feature event at the track is the Gain Feeds Select Stakes.

The main event held at the track is the Gain Feeds Select Stakes which for many years was known as the Waterford Glass Stakes.

Facilities include a restaurant, fast food facilities, a number of bars and totalisator betting.

The stadium is near Waterford city, and has a large customer car park.

== History ==
Originally built as a Soccer stadium for Waterford Football Club, opening on 2 November 1930 and unlicensed greyhound racing. It was owned by Mr J.McGrath and agreement was reached with Mr J.Mulhall, the president of the Irish Coursing Club (ICC) for the track to be run by them and under ICC rules in 1947. It staged its first meeting during May 1947 under ICC rules and is one of the Ireland's smallest provincial tracks but still has a circumference of 460 yards.

In September 1978 a new restaurant was built by the owners the Waterford Greyhound Racing Company and overseen by Racing Manager Paddy Grant. The track managed to survive despite the large scale redundancies at the nearby Waterford Glass works in the late eighties. Waterford United Football Club remained at the stadium until 1993 and European Cup matches were held at this venue before the club moved grounds.

Greyhound Racing Ireland took over the venue and invested in improvements in 2002, with a major facelift throughout the stadium and on the track. In 2006 a €3.5m extension featuring a new 180-seated restaurant and bar bringing the facilities up to a very high standard.

In December 2023, the stadium renewed the contract agreement (as part of the GRI) with S.I.S for 2024.

== Competitions ==
- Select Stakes

== Track records ==
Current

Yards	Greyhound	Time	Date	Notes
300	Montos Mark	15.91	4 November 2006	
325	Gingko	17.19	3 May 2008	
500	Ardfert Billy	26.95	28 May 2005	
525	Droopys Curio	27.94	5 September 2020	Munster Oaks Semi-Final
550	Ardfert Billy	29.20	22 October 2005	
575	Jeffys Crystal	30.80	1 November 2008	
730	Jemmy Doodlebeag	39.98	22 November 2008	
790	Making Merry	43.20	25 August 2001	
815	Group Skater	45.51	27 December 2008	
815	Compass Cowboy	=45.51	4 April 2009	
525 hurdles	Secondrate Champ	28.67	2 April 2005	

Former

Yards	Greyhound	Time	Date	Notes
290	Tuesdays Daley	15.98	10 June 1989	
290	Concentration	15.84	20 April 1991	
300	Prince Kay	16.75	16 August 1968	
300	Toms Pal	16.35	26 August 1972	
300	Quarter To Five	15.99	3 July 1999	
300	Montos Mark	15.91	4 November 2006	
310	Square Kid	17.89	1950	
310	Last Landing	17.25	25 July 1959	
325	Roxholme Ryan	17.22	26 April 2008	
325	Slippery Sam	28.80	22 July 1961	
500	Javas Jet	27.52	5 August 2000	
500	Cooly Merson	27.34	14 May 2001	
500	Magna Replay	27.39*	4 May 2002	
500	Sir Chris	27.21	14 May 2002	
500	Hazel Bank Queen	27.00	12 April 2003	
525	Cookhouse	30.20	1950	
525	Good Stayer	29.40	17 July 1965	
525	Peruvian Style	29.34	1975	
525	Peruvian Style	29.28	27 April 1976	
525	Lady Referee	29.28	21 August 1976	
525	The Other Duke	29.24	16 October 1984	
525	Yale Princess	28.99	28 May 1988	
525	Daring Lance	28.82	19 October 1991	
525	Mr Pickwick	28.25	24 May 1997	
525	Killaspy Jack	28.25	20 August 2005	
525	Abbeyside Blonde	28.17	17 September 2005	
525	Lolos Choice	28.09	27 September 2005	
525	Paradise Maverik	28.01	8 November 2014	
550	Sparta Tom	29.74	18 August 2001	
550	Kilmacar Joker	29.72	3 August 2002	
550	Glenske Ghost	29.67	16 August 2003	
550	Seventh Gear	29.52	31 July 2004	
575	Tory Spot	30.96	1 March 2008	
700	Local Minnie	40.35	24 August 1963	
700	Kontiki Lady	40.35	11 April 1964	=equalled
700	Westpark April	40.20	19 August 1972	
700	Tinahue Sam	39.38	22 August 1987	
700	Druicidin	39.98	11 June 1988	
700	Queenies Fire	39.98	19 November 1988	
700	Crinkle	39.71	17 August 1991	
730	Making Merry	40.05	18 August 2001	
770	Tain Nua	44.02	23 September 1978	
770	Narabane Silver	43.14	August 1991	
310 H	Ollys Prince	17.85	6 August 1960	
525 H	Chancellorstown Lad	31.30	1950	
525 H	I'm Funny	30.30	1 September 1962	
525 H	Kansil Gift	29.16	19 October 2002	
525 H	Bally Euro	28.95	23 May 2003	
525 H	Bally Euro	28.95	14 May 2004	
