= Transport F.C. =

- Full name: Transport Football Club
- Founded: 1935
- Ground: Carlisle Grounds; Harold's Cross Stadium
- League: League of Ireland; Leinster Senior League
Home colours

Transport Football Club is an Irish association football club who played in the League of Ireland for fourteen seasons from 1948–49 to 1961–62. They currently play in the Leinster Senior League. Like several earlier League of Ireland clubs, such as St James's Gate, Jacobs, Midland Athletic, Fordsons and the current team Dundalk, Transport had their origins as a factory or works team. They were effectively the football team of Córas Iompair Éireann.

== History ==
=== League of Ireland ===
Chart of yearly table positions for Transport in League of Ireland

In 1948–49 when the League of Ireland was expanded from ten to twelve team, together with Sligo Rovers, Transport was one of two teams invited to join. In 1946–47 they had been Leinster Senior League champions. In their debut season they finished fifth and they repeated this feat in 1956–57. These were their best two performances in the league. At the end of the 1961–62 season, the league was reduced to ten teams. On this occasion both Transport and Sligo Rovers failed to get re-elected.

==== Stats ====
Stat	Opponent	Score	Date
Biggest League Win	Sligo Rovers	6–0	16 March 1958
Biggest League Defeat	Cork Hibernians	1–10	20 March 1960

=== FAI Cup ===
The highlight of Transport's time in the League of Ireland was winning the 1949–50 FAI Cup. The team was managed by Matt Giles, an uncle of Johnny Giles. After knocking out Waterford, Bohemians and Sligo Rovers in the early rounds, Transport defeated Cork Athletic in the final played over three games. The original final and first replay both finished 2–2 before Transport won the third game 3–1.

=== Leinster Senior League ===
After leaving the league, Transport rejoined the Leinster Senior League. In 1962–63 they won their second Leinster league title. They also won the FAI Intermediate Cup in 1963–64, 1965–66 and 1973–74. In 1975 they moved to the Transport Club in Crumlin, Dublin. Having some success through the years. In 2017 they withdrew from the Leinster Senior League for a Season. Returning in June 2018 to Premier Sunday.

=== Modern era ===
Transport departed intermediate football for the junior ranks, entering the FAI Junior Cup in 2026. They played their first round game against Athy Town, losing 0–6.

== Home grounds ==
Between 1948 and 1951, Transport played their home matches at the Carlisle Grounds in Bray, County Wicklow. Between 1951 and 1962 they played at Harold's Cross Stadium in Dublin. From 1962, they have played at the nearby Transport Club in Dublin 12.

== Honours ==
- Leinster Senior League: 2
  - 1946–47, 1962–63
- FAI Cup: 1
  - 1949–50
- Leinster Senior Cup: 1
  - 1951–52
- FAI Intermediate Cup: 3
  - 1963–64, 1965–66, 1973–74

== Notable former players ==
=== Republic of Ireland internationals ===
On 26 July 1948, Peter McDonald represented Ireland in the 1948 Olympic Football Tournament. He played in Ireland's only game in the competition against the Netherlands. He became the first Transport to represent Ireland at international level. The following Transport players also represented Ireland, the majority either before or after playing for Transport.

- (Republic of Ireland) Ray Brady
- (Republic of Ireland) Fran Brennan
- (Republic of Ireland) Brendan Carroll
- (Republic of Ireland) Tommy Dunne
- (Republic of Ireland) Mick Fairclough
- (Republic of Ireland) Paddy Fagan
- (Republic of Ireland) Eddie Gannon
- (Republic of Ireland) Robin Lawler
- (Republic of Ireland) Maxie McCann
- (Republic of Ireland) Peter McDonald
- (Republic of Ireland) Albie Murphy

=== League of Ireland XI representative ===
- (Republic of Ireland) Mick Cahill

=== Goalscorers ===
In 1948–49 Bernie Lester, with 12, was joint top goalscorer in the League of Ireland.

- Top League Scorer (total): 30, Bernie Lester (1948–53)
- Top League Scorer (season): 15, Johnny McGeehan (1957–58)
