= Dublin City Cup =

Irish football tournament

The Dublin City Cup is a defunct Irish football tournament which was played for by all League of Ireland sides (and not just those from Dublin city as the name suggests). It ran from 1933 and ran uninterrupted until 1973. In the 1975–76 season it was revived and played for by sides who did not reach the League of Ireland Cup quarter-finals. In 1983–84 it was revived again but only eight teams were invited to play, the six Dublin sides (Bohemians, Shamrock Rovers, Shelbourne, St Patrick's Athletic, UCD and Home Farm) along with Drogheda United and Dundalk.

It was played in a variety of formats; from complete round robin series to straight knock out tournaments. From the 1951–52 season it was played as a knockout tournament. It was traditionally seen as the fourth most important competition for League of Ireland sides (after the League, FAI Cup and League of Ireland Shield or League Cup).

In both 1956–57 and 1959–60 Shamrock Rovers drew with Drumcondra in the final but won the trophy based on the unusual tiebreaker of having been awarded more corner kicks.

== List of winners ==
- 1934-35* Dolphin
- 1935-36 Bohemians
- 1936-37 Sligo Rovers
- 1937-38 Dundalk
- 1938-39 St James's Gate
- 1939-40 Drumcondra
- 1940-41 Drumcondra
- 1941-42 Shelbourne
- 1942-43 Dundalk
- 1943-44 Cork United
- 1944-45 Shamrock Rovers
- 1945-46 Cork United
- 1946-47 Shelbourne
- 1947-48 Shamrock Rovers
- 1948-49 Dundalk
- 1949-50 Drumcondra
- 1950-51 Drumcondra
- 1951-52 Drumcondra
- 1952-53 Shamrock Rovers
- 1953-54 St Patrick's Athletic
- 1954-55 Shamrock Rovers
- 1955-56 St Patrick's Athletic
- 1956-57 Shamrock Rovers
- 1957-58 Shamrock Rovers
- 1958-59 Limerick
- 1959-60 Shamrock Rovers
- 1960-61 Drumcondra
- 1961-62 Cork Celtic
- 1962-63 Shelbourne
- 1963-64 Shamrock Rovers
- 1964-65 Shelbourne
- 1965-66 Cork Hibernians
- 1966-67 Shamrock Rovers
- 1967-68 Dundalk
- 1968-69 Dundalk
- 1969-70 Limerick
- 1970-71 Cork Hibernians
- 1971-72 Finn Harps
- 1972-73 Cork Hibernians
- 1975-76 St Patrick's Athletic
- 1983-84 Shamrock Rovers

== See also ==
- League of Ireland
- FAI Cup
- League of Ireland Cup
- League of Ireland Shield
