= 1961–62 League of Ireland =

League of Ireland
- Season: 1961–62
- Champions: Shelbourne (7th Title)
- European Cup: Shelbourne
- Cup Winners Cup: Shamrock Rovers
- Fairs Cup: Drumcondra
- Matches: 132
- Goals: 529 (4.01 per match)
- Top goalscorer: Eddie Bailham (Shamrock Rovers), 21

Statistics of League of Ireland in the 1961/1962 season.

== Overview ==
It was contested by 12 teams, and Shelbourne won the championship after beating Cork Celtic, 1–0, in a Championship play-off on 2 May 1962 at Dalymount Park.

Shelbourne qualified to play in the European Cup, Shamrock Rovers qualified to play in the Cup Winners' Cup, and Drumcondra qualified to play in the Fairs Cup for next season.

== Final classification ==
Pos	Team	Pld	W	D	L	GF	GA	GD	Pts	Qualification
1	Shelbourne	22	15	5	2	55	23	+32	35	European Cup
2	Cork Celtic	22	16	3	3	71	24	+47	35	
3	Shamrock Rovers	22	14	3	5	51	32	+19	31	Cup Winners Cup
4	St Patrick's Athletic	22	11	3	8	48	46	+2	25	
5	Cork Hibernians	22	8	8	6	37	36	+1	25 (Note: After a protest the points for the drawn game between Cork Hibernians and Limerick were awarded to Cork Hibernians.)	
6	Limerick	22	10	5	7	41	34	+7	24	
7	Drumcondra	22	8	6	8	45	40	+5	22	Fairs Cup
8	Dundalk	22	8	5	9	42	36	+6	21	
9	Bohemians	22	6	5	11	40	46	−6	17	
10	Waterford	22	7	3	12	39	49	−10	17	
11	Transport (Note: Transport and Sligo Rovers were not re-elected to the league for next season.)	22	2	3	17	29	76	−47	7	
12	Sligo Rovers	22	1	3	18	31	87	−56	5	

Source: www.rsssf.com

== Results ==
Home \ Away	BOH	CCF	CHF	DRU	DUN	LIM	SHM	SHE	SLI	StP	TRA	WAT
Bohemians	—	2–2	3–3	1–5	2–1	1–2	2–3	1–0	5–0	1–4	2–0	2–1
Cork Celtic	3–1	—	5–1	1–0	4–1	1–1	4–0	1–1	8–1	0–2	5–1	4–1
Cork Hibernians	2–1	2–3	—	2–0	2–2	+:- (Note: The match between Cork Hibernians and Limerick (1–1) was resulted in a goalless win for Cork.)	1–1	1–2	4–1	0–1	4–0	1–1
Drumcondra	2–1	2–1	1–1	—	4–1	2–4	0–2	1–1	5–1	2–3	4–2	2–1
Dundalk	2–0	1–2	4–1	1–1	—	1–2	0–2	2–2	3–0	0–1	5–0	4–1
Limerick	2–0	1–4	1–2	2–3	1–1	—	1–1	1–2	6–3	2–1	3–3	1–0
Shamrock Rovers	3–2	1–3	3–0	4–3	3–1	2–0	—	1–2	0–0	3–1	4–2	2–0
Shelbourne	0–0	3–0	1–2	3–2	1–0	3–1	6–2	—	7–0	3–3	2–1	2–1
Sligo Rovers	4–4	0–2	2–3	1–1	2–5	1–4	1–3	2–7	—	0–1	6–4	1–5
St Patrick's Athletic	2–2	2–8	2–2	3–1	2–3	1–2	0–5	0–2	4–1	—	5–3	3–2
Transport	1–5	0–6	1–1	1–1	1–2	0–4	3–1	1–2	2–1	1–6	—	1–3
Waterford	4–2	0–4	1–2	3–3	2–2	2–0	0–5	0–3	4–3	3–1	4–1	—

Legend: Blue = home team win; Yellow = draw; Red = away team win.

== Top scorers ==
Rank	Player	Club	Goals
1	Eddie Bailham	Shamrock Rovers	21
2	Donal Leahy	Cork Celtic	18
3	Eric Barber	Shelbourne	15
3	Austin Noonan	Cork Celtic	15
5	Ronnie Whelan	St Patrick's Athletic	12
6	Jimmy Morrissey	Drumcondra	11
7	Ben Hannigan	Shelbourne	10
7	George Lynam	Cork Celtic	10
7	Donal O'Leary	Cork Celtic	10
10	Johnny Kingston	Bohemians	9
10	Jackie Mooney	Cork Hibernians	9
10	Eddie Mulvey	Limerick	9
10	Tommy O'Connor	Limerick	9
10	Paddy O'Rourke	St Patrick's Athletic	9
10	Willie Peyton	St Patrick's Athletic	9
