= 1962–63 League of Ireland =

League of Ireland
- Season: 1962–63
- Champions: Dundalk (2nd Title)
- European Cup: Dundalk
- Cup Winners Cup: Shelbourne
- Fairs Cup: Shamrock Rovers
- Matches played: 90
- Goals scored: 306 (3.4 per match)
- Top goalscorer: Mick Lynch (Waterford) 12

Statistics of League of Ireland in the 1962/1963 season.

== Overview ==
It was contested by 10 teams, and Dundalk won the championship.

== Final classification ==
Pos	Team	Pld	W	D	L	GF	GA	GD	Pts	Qualification
1	Dundalk	18	9	6	3	39	23	+16	24	European Cup
2	Waterford	18	10	3	5	50	37	+13	23	
3	Drumcondra	18	10	3	5	33	27	+6	23	
4	Cork Celtic	18	6	9	3	33	22	+11	21	
5	Shamrock Rovers	18	7	5	6	36	25	+11	19	Fairs Cup
6	Cork Hibernians	18	7	4	7	22	25	−3	18	
7	Shelbourne	18	7	4	7	29	35	−6	18	Cup Winners' Cup
8	Limerick	18	5	3	10	22	30	−8	13	
9	St Patrick's Athletic	18	4	5	9	23	47	−24	13	
10	Bohemians	18	1	6	11	19	35	−16	8	

Source: www.rsssf.com

Drogheda and Sligo Rovers were elected to the league for next season.

== Results ==
Home \ Away	BOH	CCF	CHF	DRU	DUN	LIM	SHM	SHE	StP	WAT
Bohemians	—	1–1	0–1	0–1	2–2	2–0	0–0	2–2	1–2	1–3
Cork Celtic	2–1	—	1–1	5–0	2–2	3–2	2–2	3–3	1–1	4–2
Cork Hibernians	2–1	0–1	—	0–1	1–0	0–1	3–2	1–0	0–1	3–3
Drumcondra	2–1	2–1	1–2	—	0–0	2–1	2–1	4–0	3–0	2–0
Dundalk	5–1	2–1	2–0	5–2	—	3–0	1–3	2–1	4–1	2–2
Limerick	3–0	0–0	3–3	3–3	0–2	—	1–0	1–4	3–0	2–3
Shamrock Rovers	3–1	0–0	5–2	2–0	1–1	0–1	—	5–0	1–1	2–4
Shelbourne	2–1	0–0	1–0	2–2	2–1	1–0	2–4	—	1–2	2–3
St Patrick's Athletic	1–1	1–5	1–1	1–5	2–2	2–0	1–4	2–3	—	3–6
Waterford	3–3	2–1	1–2	3–1	2–3	2–1	3–1	2–3	6–1	—

Legend: Blue = home team win; Yellow = draw; Red = away team win.

== Top scorers ==
Rank	Player	Club	Goals
1	Mick Lynch	Waterford	12
2	Jackie Mooney	Shamrock Rovers	11
3	Jimmy Hasty	Dundalk	9
4	Eric Barber	Shelbourne	8
4	Al Casey	Waterford	8
4	Jackie Hennessy	Shelbourne	8
4	Frank McCarthy	Cork Celtic	8
4	Austin Noonan	Cork Celtic	8
9	Ben Hannigan	Shelbourne	7
9	Donal Leahy	Cork Celtic	7
