= List of Shelbourne F.C. seasons =

The Irish League seasons 1915/16-1918/19 were suspended due to World War I. Shelbourne competed in the Irish League and Irish Cup for the 1920/21 season but resigned from the league and cup during the season following a dispute with the Irish Football Association.

== Seasons ==
Season	Irish Football League								Irish Cup	Top scorer	
Season	P	W	D	L	F	A	Pts	Pos	Irish Cup	Top scorer	
1904–05	14	5	3	6	15	17	13	=5	Runners-up	L. Lawless	4
1905–06	14	5	2	7	16	18	21	=5	Winners	James Owens	6
1906–07	14	8	3	3	27	21	19	2	Runners-up	J. Murphy	9
1907–08	14	6	2	6	22	17	14	=4	Runners-up	J. Murphy	6
1908–09	14	7	0	7	20	20	14	3		J. Enright / J. Murphy	3
1909–10	14	2	7	5	15	24	11	=6		M. Foley	4
1910–11	14	3	4	7	15	31	10	6	Winners	J. Strothers	3
1911–12	14	2	3	9	12	33	7	=6		W. O'Brien / W. Watson	2
1912–13	18	7	4	7	20	23	18	=6		A. Stafford	10
1913–14	14	6	2	6	16	10	14	5		Crowe / D. Mitchell	3
1914–15	14	6	3	5	17	12	15	=4		Chalmers	7
1919–20	14	3	7	4	16	21	13	4	Winners	Ed Brookes	7

Season	League of Ireland									FAI Cup	Shield/ League Cup^{[C]}	Europe	Top scorer	
Season	Division (Note: In 1985 with the introduction of 6 new teams the league was split into two divisions. Prior to this there was just one division.)	P	W	D	L	F	A	Pts	Pos	FAI Cup	Shield/ League Cup^{[C]}	Europe	Top scorer	
1921–22	A Division	14	8	2	4	31	21	18	3rd	Semi-Finals	Winners		Mick Foley	6
1922–23	A Division	22	15	4	3	72	14	34	3rd	Runners-up	Winners		Mick Keegan	11
1923–24	A Division	18	13	2	3	55	21	28	2nd	Round 2			Frank Rushe	12
1924–25	A Division	18	12	3	3	55	20	27	3rd	Runners-up			Mick Maguire	10
1925–26	A Division	18	14	3	1	65	23	31	1st	Round 1	Winners		Jock Simpson	18
1926–27	A Division	18	13	3	2	63	24	29	2nd	Semi-Finals			Jock McMillan	17
1927–28	A Division	18	13	2	3	67	24	28	2nd	Semi-Finals			Sammy McIlvenny	22
1928–29	A Division	18	16	1	1	49	12	33	1st	Round 1			David Byrne	15
1929–30	A Division	18	14	1	3	59	25	29	2nd	Round 1	Winners		Johnny Ledwidge	16
1930–31	A Division	22	13	5	4	52	22	31	1st	Round 1			Alex Hair	29
1931–32	A Division	22	10	6	6	43	34	26	6th	Semi-Finals			George Lennox / Robert Skinner	8
1932–33	A Division	18	10	3	5	45	26	23	3rd	Semi-Finals			Clarence Wonnacott	9
1933–34	A Division	18	6	5	7	22	25	17	6th	Round 1			Frank Brady	8
1936–37	A Division	22	9	3	10	53	48	21	8th	Round 1			Bob Slater	19
1937–38	A Division	22	6	6	10	36	47	18	7th	Round 1			Jimmy Doyle	12
1938–39	A Division	22	9	4	9	40	48	22	6th	Winners			Alex Weir	10
1939–40	A Division	22	6	8	8	41	39	20	7th	Round 1			Mick Delaney	12
1940–41	A Division	20	3	9	8	23	31	15	10th	Round 2			Willie Fallon	5
1941–42	A Division	18	8	5	5	38	29	21	3rd	Round 2			Paddy Bradshaw	11
1942–43	A Division	18	7	5	6	35	28	19	5th	Round 1			John Cassidy	10
1943–44	A Division	14	9	3	2	32	22	21	1st	Runners-up	Winners		Mick McCluskey	8
1944–45	A Division	14	5	3	6	21	21	13	5th	Round 1	Winners		Harry Hill	5
1945–46	A Division	14	3	2	9	26	44	8	8th	Semi-Finals			Gerry Malone	7
1946–47	A Division	14	8	3	3	34	24	19	1st	Semi-Finals			Alf Hanson	11
1947–48	A Division	14	7	3	4	30	24	17	3rd	Round 2			Brendan Carroll	9
1948–49	A Division	18	9	5	4	39	23	23	2nd	Runners-up	Winners		Brendan Carroll	10
1949–50	A Division	18	7	7	4	39	23	23	3rd	Round 1			Martin Colfer	5
1950–51	A Division	18	8	4	6	37	27	20	4th	Runners-up			Martin Colfer	10
1951–52	A Division	22	13	5	4	59	44	31	2nd	Round 2			Rory Dwyer	22
1952–53	A Division	22	12	6	4	46	24	30	1st	Round 1			Rory Dwyer	13
1953–54	A Division	22	10	3	9	35	35	23	6th	Round 2			Martin Colfer / Jimmy Moloney	6
1954–55	A Division	22	13	2	7	62	41	28	4th	Round 2			Rory Dwyer	19
1955–56	A Division	22	8	4	10	45	42	20	6th	Round 1			Gerry Malone	15
1956–57	A Division	22	10	6	6	47	39	24	6th	Round 1			Dessie Glynn	12
1957–58	A Division	22	11	3	8	41	29	23	5th	Semi-Finals			Christy Doyle	11
1958–59	A Division	22	7	8	7	35	33	22	6th	Round 1			Christy Doyle	9
1959–60	A Division	22	11	6	5	48	33	28	3rd	Winners			Christy Doyle	14
1960–61	A Division	22	7	5	10	43	41	19	8th	Round 2			Eric Barber	14
1961–62	A Division	22	15	5	2	55	23	35	1st	Runners-up		DNQ	Eric Barber	15
1962–63	A Division	18	7	4	7	29	35	18	7th	Winners		EC R1	Eric Barber / Jackie Hennessy	8
1963–64	A Division	22	8	5	9	46	42	21	7th	Round 2		CWC R1	Eric Barber	15
1964–65	A Division	22	11	2	9	38	37	24	6th	Round 2		FC R2	Eric Barber	14
1965–66	A Division	22	10	5	7	37	30	25	4th				Eric Barber	10
1966–67	A Division	22	4	3	15	32	54	11	12th				Johnny Foran	6
1967–68	A Division	22	8	3	11	32	36	19	7th				Mick Conroy	8
1968–69	A Division	22	2	8	12	30	69	12	10th				Brian Delargey	6
1969–70	A Division	26	10	7	9	38	32	27	6th				Jimmy O'Connor	12
1970–71	A Division	26	10	7	9	32	30	27	8th		Winners		John Murray	10
1971–72	A Division	26	6	8	12	30	37	22	9th			UEFA Cup R1	Eric Barber	9
1972–73	A Division	26	9	6	11	50	40	24	8th	Runners-up			Eric Barber	13
1973–74	A Division	26	4	5	17	31	58	13	14th				Eric Barber	8
1974–75	A Division	26	6	7	13	33	38	19	13th	Runners-up			Eric Barber / Mick Lawlor	7
1975–76	A Division	26	7	7	12	42	44	21	9th				Mick Lawlor	11
1976–77	A Division	26	10	8	8	39	40	28	7th				Liam Devine	11
1977–78	A Division	30	6	11	13	32	50	23	12th				John Delamere	10
1978–79	A Division	30	6	9	15	41	58	21	13th				John Delamere	15
1979–80	A Division	30	3	6	21	30	83	12	16th				Paul Nugent	5
1980–81	A Division	30	6	6	18	31	52	18	15th				Philip Fitzgerald / Paul Nugent	5
1981–82	A Division (Note: An experimental points system was operated for the 1981–82 season whereby a team was awarded four points for an away win, three points for a home win, two points for an away draw and one point for a home draw.)	30	10	7	13	44	46	45	9th				Terry Daly	12
1982–83	A Division (Note: In 1982–83 three points were awarded for a win and one point for a draw. The system reverted the following season to the pre-1981–82 system, i.e. two points for a win and one point for a draw.)	26	13	5	8	50	45	44	5th				Kieran McCabe	17
1983–84	A Division	26	9	10	7	41	34	28	5th	Semi-Finals			John Delamere	10
1984–85	A Division	30	9	8	13	39	46	26	12th				Paul Mullen / Paul Newe	8
1985–86	Premier	22	3	7	12	15	40	13	11th (R)				Paul Newe	6
1986–87	First	18	12	3	3	39	20	27	2nd (P)				Bobby Browne / Kieran McCabe	5
1987–88	Premier	33	8	8	17	31	44	24	10th				Bobby Browne	6
1988–89	Premier	33	8	10	15	26	40	26	9th				Philip Byrne	5
1989–90	Premier	33	10	13	10	39	39	33	7th				Garry Haylock	10
1990–91	Premier	33	18	6	9	59	30	42	4th	Round 2			Paul Newe	14
1991–92	Premier	33	21	7	5	57	29	49	1st	Quarter-Finals			Garry Haylock	13
1992–93	Premier (Note: In 1992–93 the Premier Division 'split' into two sections of six after the 22nd series of games had been played on 17 January. Shelbourne qualified for the top six and finished in a three-way tie in the top six (Group 'A'). There was a three-way playoff with Shelbourne, Cork and Bohemians with each team playing each other twice. They couldn't be seen so they played each other once more at neutral venues with Shelbourne finishing 3rd.)	32	15	10	7	53	29	40	3rd	Winners		EC Q	Garry Haylock	15
1993–94	Premier	32	11	10	11	42	42	43	5th	Round 1	Runners-up	CWC R1	Barry O'Connor	7
1994–95	Premier	33	16	9	8	45	32	57	3rd	Runners-up		DNQ	Vinny Arkins	13
1995–96	Premier	33	15	9	9	45	33	54	4th	Winners	Winners	UEFA Cup Q	Stephen Geoghegan	20
1996–97	Premier	33	15	9	9	52	36	54	3rd	Winners		CWC Q	Stephen Geoghegan	16
1997–98	Premier	33	20	7	6	58	32	67	2nd	Runners-up	Runners-up	CWC Q	Stephen Geoghegan	17
1998–99	Premier	33	13	8	12	37	35	47	3rd	Semi-Finals		UEFA Cup 1Q	Tony Sheridan	9
1999–2000	Premier	33	19	12	2	49	20	69	1st	Winners	Round 2	IC R1	Stephen Geoghegan	12
2000–01	Premier	33	17	9	7	53	37	60	2nd	Quarter-Finals	Round 1	CL 2QR	Richie Foran / Stephen Geoghegan	11
2001–02	Premier (Note: St Patrick's Athletic had 15 points deducted for fielding an ineligible player.)	33	19	6	8	50	28	63	1st	Round 3	Round 1	UEFA Cup Q	Stephen Geoghegan	9
2002–03	Premier (Note: The Premier Division was cut to 10 teams and shortened in length by maintaining only 3 rounds of fixtures in the 2002–03 season. The FAI Cup final was played in October '02 making it two FAI Cup finals in one year. The League Cup competition was not played. These measures were aimed at easing the transition from a "Winter schedule"(Autumn-Summer) to "Summer Soccer"(Spring-Winter).)	27	15	4	8	44	26	49	2nd	Round 3	No Competition	CL 1Q	Stuart Byrne / Stephen Geoghegan	9
2003	Premier	36	19	12	5	52	28	69	1st	Round 3	Round 1	UEFA Cup Q	Jason Byrne	25
2004	Premier	36	19	11	6	57	37	68	1st	Round 3	Round 1	CL 3Q UEFA Cup R1	Jason Byrne	28
2005	Premier	33	20	7	6	62	25	67	3rd	Round 2	Semi-Finals	CL 2Q	Jason Byrne	30
2006	Premier (Note: Shelbourne were relegated to the First Division for financial irregularities.)	30	18	8	4	60	27	62	1st	Round 3	Runners-up	IC Semi-Finals	Jason Byrne	23
2007	First	36	11	10	15	46	46	43	5th	Round 2	Round 2	CL Withdrew	Mark Leech	12
2008	First	36	20	10	6	55	25	70	2nd	Round 3	Round 2		Anto Flood	15
2009	First	33	22	7	4	66	31	73	2nd	Round 3	Round 2		David McAllister	19
2010	First	33	18	7	8	57	31	61	4th	Round 4	Preliminary Round		Daniel Corcoran	13
2011	First	30	22	2	6	62	24	68	2nd (P)	Runners-up	Quarter-Finals		Philip Hughes	27
2012	Premier	30	9	8	13	35	43	35	8th	Semi-Finals	Round 2		Philip Hughes	11
2013	Premier	33	5	6	22	25	56	21	12th (R)	Quarter-Finals	Round 1		Philip Hughes	27
2014	First	28	14	10	4	46	10	52	2nd	Round 3	Round 1		Dylan Connolly	12
2015	First	28	13	6	9	37	34	45	4th	Round 2	Round 1		Philip Hughes	7
2016	First	28	9	3	16	36	40	30	6th	Round 2	Quarter-Finals		James English	11
2017	First	28	11	7	10	37	32	40	4th	Round 2	Quarter-finals		James English	8
2018	First	27	13	11	3	52	21	50	3rd	Round 2	Quarter-finals		David O'Sullivan	15
2019	First	27	19	3	5	50	19	60	1st (P)	Round 1	Round 2		Ciarán Kilduff	13
2020	Premier	18	5	4	9	13	22	19	9th (R)	Quarter Finals	Abandoned due to pandemic			
2021	First	27	16	9	2	49	23	57	1st (P)	Round 1	Tournament not held		Ryan Brennan	14
2022	Premier	36	10	11	15	40	49	41	7th	Runners-up	Tournament not held		Seán Boyd	11
2023	Premier	36	15	15	6	44	27	60	4th	Round 1	Tournament not held		Jack Moylan	15
2024	Premier	36	17	12	7	40	27	63	1st	Quarter-finals	Tournament not held	UCL 2QR	Seán Boyd	10
2025	Premier	36	15	14	7	48	37	59	3rd	Third round	Tournament not held			
2026	Premier										Tournament not held	UCL		

== Key ==
Champions	Runners-up	Promoted	Relegated

Division shown in bold when it changes due to promotion or relegation. Top scorers shown in bold are players who finished the season as top scorer of their division.

Key to league record:

- P = Played
- W = Games won
- D = Games drawn
- L = Games lost
- F = Goals for
- A = Goals against
- Pts = Points
- Pos = Final position

Key to divisions:

- Premier = LOI Premier Division
- First = LOI First Division

Key to rounds:

- DNQ = Did not qualify
- QR = Qualifying Round
- PR = Preliminary Round
- R1 = First Round
- R2 = Second Round
- R3 = Third Round
- R4 = Fourth Round
- R5 = Fifth Round
- Grp = Group Stage
- QF = Quarter-finals
- SF = Semi-finals
- RU = Runners-up
- W = Winners
