= 1957–58 League of Ireland =

League of Ireland
- Season: 1957–58
- Champions: Drumcondra (3rd title)
- European Cup: Drumcondra
- Matches played: 132
- Goals scored: 492 (3.73 per match)
- Top goalscorer: Donal Leahy (16 goals)
- Biggest home win: Dundalk 8–2 Cork Hibernians; Shamrock Rovers 8–2 Transport
- Biggest away win: Sligo Rovers 0–6 Transport
- Highest scoring: Bohemians 3–7 Drumcondra; Dundalk 8–2 Cork Hibernians; Shamrock Rovers 8–2 Transport

The 1957–58 League of Ireland was the 37th season of senior football in the Republic of Ireland.

Shamrock Rovers were the defending champions.

== Changes from 1956–57 season ==
Cork Athletic resigned from the League, and were replaced by Cork Hibernians.

== Teams ==
Locations of the 1957–58 League of Ireland teams

Team	Location	Stadium
Bohemians	Dublin (Phibsborough)	Dalymount Park
Cork Hibernians	Cork (Mardyke)	Mardyke
Drumcondra	Dublin (Drumcondra)	Tolka Park
Dundalk	Dundalk	Oriel Park
Evergreen United	Cork (Turners Cross)	Turners Cross
Limerick	Limerick	Markets Field
Shamrock Rovers	Dublin (Milltown)	Glenmalure Park
Shelbourne	Dublin (Ringsend)	Shelbourne Park
Sligo Rovers	Sligo	The Showgrounds
St Patrick's Athletic	Dublin (Phibsborough)	Dalymount Park
Transport	Dublin (Harold's Cross)	Harold's Cross Stadium
Waterford	Waterford	Kilcohan Park

== Season overview ==
Drumcondra won their third title and qualified for the following season's European Cup.

== Final classification ==
Pos	Team	Pld	W	D	L	GF	GA	GD	Pts	Qualification
1	Drumcondra	22	15	3	4	51	23	+28	33	Qualification for European Cup preliminary round
2	Shamrock Rovers	22	15	1	6	55	26	+29	31	
3	Evergreen United	22	13	3	6	53	30	+23	29	
4	St Patrick's Athletic	22	10	6	6	45	32	+13	26	
5	Shelbourne	22	11	3	8	41	29	+12	25	
6	Waterford	22	10	3	9	43	37	+6	23	
7	Limerick	22	7	5	10	31	40	−9	19	
8	Dundalk	22	7	3	12	38	46	−8	17	
9	Bohemians	22	6	4	12	36	52	−16	16	
10	Transport	22	6	4	12	30	50	−20	16	
11	Sligo Rovers	22	5	5	12	32	61	−29	15	
12	Cork Hibernians	22	6	2	14	37	66	−29	14	

Source: RSSSF, foot.dk

== Results ==
Home \ Away	BOH	CHB	DRU	DUN	EVE	LIM	SHM	SHE	SLI	STP	TRA	WAT
Bohemians	—	3–1	3–7	2–2	2–1	2–0	2–4	0–3	6–1	0–2	2–2	1–1
Cork Hibernians	3–3	—	3–2	4–2	2–7	2–0	2–1	2–4	3–1	3–5	0–1	1–3
Drumcondra	3–2	5–0	—	3–0	1–1	4–0	1–2	2–1	5–0	2–1	0–1	1–0
Dundalk	3–2	8–2	0–1	—	0–1	1–3	1–0	0–2	3–1	3–3	1–0	1–2
Evergreen United	4–2	2–1	1–2	4–2	—	1–0	1–2	3–0	5–1	4–1	4–1	3–0
Limerick	2–0	5–2	1–1	3–2	2–2	—	2–4	3–3	2–0	0–0	1–0	1–2
Shamrock Rovers	6–0	1–1	3–0	0–1	6–2	2–0	—	1–0	5–1	1–2	8–2	3–2
Shelbourne	0–1	3–0	0–1	5–2	2–0	4–1	2–1	—	1–1	0–1	2–0	2–3
Sligo Rovers	3–0	3–0	2–3	4–2	2–1	0–2	0–2	1–1	—	2–2	0–6	1–5
St Patrick's Athletic	1–0	1–2	2–2	0–2	0–3	3–0	3–0	4–0	2–2	—	5–0	4–1
Transport	2–1	2–0	0–3	1–1	0–2	2–2	0–1	2–5	3–4	2–2	—	3–2
Waterford	1–2	4–3	0–2	3–1	1–1	3–1	1–2	0–1	2–2	3–1	4–0	—

Source: Extratime.ie
Legend: Blue = home team win; Yellow = draw; Red = away team win.

== Top scorers ==
Rank	Player	Club	Goals
1	Donal Leahy	Evergreen United	16
2	Johnny McGeehan	Transport	15
2	Austin Noonan	Evergreen United	15
4	Ronnie Whelan	St Patrick's Athletic	14
5	Jack Fitzgerald	Waterford	12
6	Christy Doyle	Shelbourne	11
6	Vic Meldrum	Sligo Rovers	11
8	Dermot Cross	Drumcondra	10
9	Willie Coleman	Drumcondra	9
9	Maxie McCann	Shamrock Rovers	9
9	Donal O'Leary	Evergreen United	9
