= 1962 League of Ireland Championship play-off =

The 1962 League of Ireland Championship play-off was contested by Shelbourne of Dublin and Cork Celtic on 2 May at Dalymount Park, Dublin.

Both sides had finished level with 35 points from 22 matches when the regular season was finished, and as goal difference was not used at the time to settle the League of Ireland championship, a once off match was needed to decide the destination of the title and the League's place in the 1962–63 European Cup.

== Match summary ==
Ben Hannigan scored the only goal of the game.

== Match details ==
Shelbourne 1-0 Cork Celtic

Scorer:Hannigan

Shelbourne line-up: John Heavey, Tommy Carroll, Brendan O'Brien, Pat Bonham, Freddie Strahan, Paddy Roberts, Joe Wilson, Ben Hannigan, Eric Barber, Jackie Hennessy, 'Ollie' Conroy

Cork Celtic line-up: Kevin Blount; S O'Keeffe, Pat O'Mahony; Ray Cowhie, Johnny Coughlan, Mick Millington; Paul O'Donovan, Austin Noonan, Donal Leahy, Frank McCarthy, Donal O'Leary
