= 1966–67 League of Ireland =

League of Ireland
- Season: 1966–67
- Champions: Dundalk (3rd title)
- Matches: 132
- Goals: 459 (3.48 per match)
- Top goalscorer: 15 Johnny Brookes (Sligo Rovers); 15 Danny Hale (Dundalk)

Statistics of League of Ireland in the 1966/1967 season.

== Overview ==
It was contested by 12 teams, and Dundalk won the championship.

== Final classification ==
Pos	Team	Pld	W	D	L	GF	GA	GD	Pts
1	Dundalk	22	15	4	3	54	19	+35	34
2	Bohemians	22	12	3	7	45	27	+18	27
3	Sligo Rovers	22	11	5	6	37	29	+8	27
4	Limerick	22	9	6	7	31	29	+2	24
5	Waterford	22	11	1	10	53	48	+5	23
6	St Patrick's Athletic	22	8	5	9	49	51	−2	21
7	Shamrock Rovers	22	8	4	10	31	31	0	20
8	Drumcondra	22	6	8	8	35	38	−3	20
9	Cork Hibernians	22	7	5	10	31	39	−8	19
10	Drogheda	22	7	5	10	31	42	−11	19
11	Cork Celtic	22	8	3	11	30	52	−22	19
12	Shelbourne	22	4	3	15	32	54	−22	11

Source: www.rsssf.org

== Results ==
Home \ Away	BOH	CCF	CHF	DRO	DRU	DUN	LIM	SHM	SHE	SLI	StP	WAT
Bohemians	—	6–0	2–1	6–1	2–1	3–0	0–0	0–2	3–0	1–0	0–1	2–2
Cork Celtic	2–4	—	0–0	2–0	4–2	1–4	2–4	0–0	0–3	0–0	1–2	3–0
Cork Hibernians	0–1	2–3	—	0–1	1–2	0–0	1–0	4–2	2–1	0–3	4–3	1–4
Drogheda United	2–1	5–1	1–2	—	0–3	1–3	1–1	1–0	2–1	2–2	2–2	4–3
Drumcondra	2–2	3–0	2–2	1–1	—	1–2	1–1	0–3	1–1	3–1	2–2	3–4
Dundalk	3–0	5–0	0–0	3–0	2–0	—	3–0	2–0	6–0	1–2	2–2	3–0
Limerick	1–0	4–0	3–2	2–2	0–2	2–3	—	0–2	1–0	0–0	2–0	1–2
Shamrock Rovers	1–2	1–2	1–1	2–1	4–1	2–1	0–1	—	2–2	1–2	1–3	2–1
Shelbourne	1–3	1–2	1–2	2–0	2–2	1–3	1–3	1–3	—	2–1	3–0	1–4
Sligo Rovers	0–3	3–1	3–0	3–1	0–0	1–1	4–1	2–1	3–1	—	3–0	3–2
St Patrick's Athletic	3–2	3–4	4–3	1–3	1–2	1–3	2–2	1–1	6–3	5–1	—	5–4
Waterford	4–2	0–2	2–3	1–0	3–1	2–4	1–2	3–0	5–4	3–0	3–2	—

Legend: Blue = home team win; Yellow = draw; Red = away team win.

== Top scorers ==
Rank	Player	Club	Goals
1	Johnny Brookes	Sligo Rovers	15
1	Danny Hale	Dundalk	15
3	Ben Hannigan	Dundalk	14
4	Johnny Campbell	St Patrick's Athletic	12
4	Eamonn Carroll	Bohemians	12
4	Johnny Matthews	Waterford	12
7	Alfie Hale	Waterford	11
8	Mick Lynch	Waterford	10
9	Carl Davenport	Cork Celtic	9
9	Noel Dunne	St Patrick's Athletic	9
9	Paul Flood	Bohemians	9
9	Joe McGrath	Limerick	9
9	Ben O'Sullivan	Bohemians	9
9	Derek Stokes	Dundalk	9
