= 1958–59 League of Ireland =

League of Ireland
- Season: 1958–59
- Champions: Shamrock Rovers (9th Title)
- European Cup: Shamrock Rovers
- Matches played: 132
- Goals scored: 474 (3.59 per match)
- Top goalscorer: Donal Leahy (Evergreen United), 22 goals

Statistics of League of Ireland in the 1958/1959 season.

== Overview ==
It was contested by 12 teams, and Shamrock Rovers won the championship and qualified to play in the European Cup for next season.

== Final classification ==
| Pos | Team | Pld | W | D | L | GF | GA | GD | Pts | Qualification |
|---|---|---|---|---|---|---|---|---|---|---|
| 1 | Shamrock Rovers | 22 | 15 | 4 | 3 | 58 | 29 | +29 | 34 | European Cup |
| 2 | Evergreen United (Note: Evergreen United changed their club name to Cork Celtic next season.) | 22 | 13 | 3 | 6 | 49 | 27 | +22 | 29 | |
| 3 | Waterford | 22 | 14 | 1 | 7 | 58 | 36 | +22 | 29 | |
| 4 | Limerick | 22 | 11 | 5 | 6 | 48 | 31 | +17 | 27 | |
| 5 | Drumcondra | 22 | 11 | 4 | 7 | 30 | 26 | +4 | 26 | |
| 6 | Shelbourne | 22 | 7 | 8 | 7 | 35 | 33 | +2 | 22 | |
| 7 | Transport | 22 | 8 | 3 | 11 | 30 | 37 | −7 | 19 | |
| 8 | St Patrick's Athletic | 22 | 9 | 0 | 13 | 45 | 59 | −14 | 18 | |
| 9 | Cork Hibernians | 22 | 5 | 5 | 12 | 29 | 43 | −14 | 15 | |
| 10 | Sligo Rovers | 22 | 6 | 3 | 13 | 34 | 51 | −17 | 15 | |
| 11 | Dundalk | 22 | 6 | 3 | 13 | 33 | 52 | −19 | 15 | |
| 12 | Bohemians | 22 | 6 | 3 | 13 | 25 | 50 | −25 | 15 | |

Source: www.rsssf.com

== Results ==
| Home \ Away | BOH | CHF | DRU | DUN | EVE | LIM | SHM | SHE | SLI | StP | TRA | WAT |
|---|---|---|---|---|---|---|---|---|---|---|---|---|
| Bohemians | — | 2–1 | 0–1 | 1–1 | 1–3 | 2–2 | 0–0 | 1–0 | 2–1 | 2–3 | 3–1 | 1–3 |
| Cork Hibernians | 6–1 | — | 0–1 | 1–0 | 1–0 | 1–3 | 3–3 | 2–2 | 2–1 | 0–2 | 1–1 | 0–4 |
| Drumcondra | 2–0 | 1–0 | — | 3–0 | 2–1 | 3–2 | 2–4 | 0–2 | 1–1 | 0–2 | 0–1 | 0–1 |
| Dundalk | 1–0 | 2–3 | 2–3 | — | 1–1 | 3–1 | 1–3 | 3–3 | 4–1 | 3–1 | 3–0 | 0–2 |
| Evergreen United | 8–2 | 1–0 | 3–2 | 4–1 | — | 2–1 | 0–1 | 2–1 | 0–1 | 3–0 | 3–3 | 3–1 |
| Limerick | 3–0 | 0–0 | 2–4 | 3–0 | 1–0 | — | 1–1 | 1–2 | 4–0 | 6–1 | 1–4 | 3–2 |
| Shamrock Rovers | 4–1 | 4–1 | 3–0 | 4–1 | 0–2 | 1–1 | — | 0–2 | 4–1 | 3–1 | 1–0 | 3–2 |
| Shelbourne | 0–1 | 2–2 | 0–0 | 5–0 | 2–2 | 0–0 | 1–4 | — | 0–2 | 5–1 | 0–5 | 2–1 |
| Sligo Rovers | 2–3 | 3–1 | 1–1 | 2–3 | 3–2 | 1–3 | 0–3 | 0–0 | — | 3–0 | 3–5 | 1–3 |
| St Patrick's Athletic | 2–1 | 3–2 | 1–2 | 6–1 | 1–3 | 2–4 | 3–4 | 2–5 | 3–5 | — | 2–1 | 2–0 |
| Transport | 3–0 | 2–1 | 0–2 | 2–1 | 0–2 | 0–3 | 0–3 | 0–0 | 2–0 | 0–6 | — | 0–1 |
| Waterford | 3–1 | 5–1 | 0–0 | 4–3 | 2–4 | 2–3 | 6–5 | 4–1 | 5–2 | 6–1 | 1–0 | — |

Legend: Blue = home team win; Yellow = draw; Red = away team win.

== Top scorers ==
| Rank | Player | Club | Goals |
|---|---|---|---|
| 1 | Donal Leahy | Evergreen United | 22 |
| 2 | Alfie Hale | Waterford | 18 |
| 3 | Peter Fitzgerald | Waterford | 17 |
| 4 | Jimmy Dunne | St Patrick's Athletic | 14 |
| 5 | Shay Gibbons | Dundalk | 11 |
| 6 | George Lynam | Limerick | 10 |
| 6 | Gerry Moore | Transport | 10 |
| 6 | Liam Tuohy | Shamrock Rovers | 10 |
| 9 | Christy Doyle | Shelbourne | 9 |
| 9 | Jackie Morley | Cork Hibs | 9 |
| 9 | Austin Noonan | Evergreen United | 9 |
| 9 | Paddy O'Rourke | St Patrick's Athletic | 9 |
| 9 | Ronnie Whelan | St Patrick's Athletic | 9 |
