= 1959–60 League of Ireland =

League of Ireland
- Season: 1959–60
- Champions: Limerick (1st Title)
- European Cup: Limerick
- Matches: 132
- Goals: 529 (4.01 per match)
- Top goalscorer: Austin Noonan (Cork Celtic), 27

Statistics of League of Ireland in the 1959/1960 season.

== Overview ==
It was contested by 12 teams, and Limerick won the championship and qualified to play in the European Cup for following season 1960/61.

== Final classification ==
Pos	Team	Pld	W	D	L	GF	GA	GD	Pts	Qualification
1	Limerick	22	15	0	7	46	26	+20	30	European Cup
2	Cork Celtic	22	12	4	6	66	44	+22	28	
3	Shelbourne	22	11	6	5	48	33	+15	28	
4	Shamrock Rovers	22	12	3	7	54	31	+23	27	
5	Dundalk	22	12	3	7	50	32	+18	27	
6	Cork Hibernians	22	12	3	7	57	37	+20	27	
7	St Patrick's Athletic	22	12	1	9	46	44	+2	25	
8	Waterford	22	10	4	8	40	43	−3	24	
9	Drumcondra	22	10	2	10	45	35	+10	22	
10	Sligo Rovers	22	5	3	14	44	67	−23	13	
11	Transport	22	3	2	17	18	66	−48	8	
12	Bohemians	22	0	5	17	15	71	−56	5	

Source: www.rsssf.com

== Results ==
Home \ Away	BOH	CCF	CHF	DRU	DUN	LIM	SHM	SHE	SLI	StP	TRA	WAT
Bohemians	—	1–1	0–1	0–3	1–6	1–6	1–4	0–2	2–2	1–6	1–1	0–1
Cork Celtic	7–1	—	2–1	2–2	2–5	4–0	3–3	4–3	4–3	5–2	3–1	4–0
Cork Hibernians	3–0	3–3	—	3–1	1–3	2–1	3–1	1–1	3–1	3–4	10–1	4–4
Drumcondra	4–0	3–5	4–1	—	0–1	2–1	1–1	3–2	6–0	0–2	6–1	0–3
Dundalk	2–1	4–0	0–2	3–1	—	0–1	4–2	0–2	4–2	3–2	3–0	2–2
Limerick	4–0	2–1	2–1	1–0	2–1	—	1–0	3–1	3–2	2–0	2–1	5–0
Shamrock Rovers	5–0	2–1	1–2	1–2	2–0	2–1	—	2–2	8–0	1–4	1–0	6–1
Shelbourne	4–1	2–0	2–0	2–1	0–0	3–2	0–2	—	3–3	2–1	3–0	0–2
Sligo Rovers	1–1	3–4	1–3	1–0	6–5	1–4	0–2	3–6	—	7–2	4–1	1–2
St Patrick's Athletic	3–0	2–1	4–1	2–4	0–2	3–2	1–3	3–3	2–1	—	1–0	1–0
Transport	2–0	0–5	0–7	0–1	1–1	0–1	3–2	0–3	1–2	3–0	—	1–6
Waterford	3–3	1–5	1–2	3–1	2–1	1–0	1–3	2–2	1–0	0–1	4–1	—

Legend: Blue = home team win; Yellow = draw; Red = away team win.

== Top scorers ==
Rank	Player	Club	Goals
1	Austin Noonan	Cork Celtic	27
2	Tommy Collins	Cork Hibernians	21
3	Donal Leahy	Cork Celtic	20
4	Liam Munroe	Dundalk	19
5	Christy Doyle	Shelbourne	14
6	Jack Fitzgerald	Waterford	13
7	Eric Barber	Shelbourne	12
7	Ronnie Whelan	St Patrick's Athletic	12
9	Dermot Cross	Shamrock Rovers	11
10	George Lynam	Limerick	10
10	John Lynch	Cork Hibernians	10
10	Dan McCaffrey	Sligo Rovers	10
10	Tommy O'Connor	Limerick	10
