= 1962–63 Dundalk F.C. season =

Dundalk
1962–63 season
- Trainer: Gerry McCourt
- League of Ireland: 1st (champions)
- FAI Cup: Second round
- League of Ireland Shield: 3rd place
- Dublin City Cup: First round
- Top Four Cup: Semi-final
- Leinster Senior Cup: Semi-final
- P.J. Casey Cup: Runners-up
- Top goalscorer: League: Jimmy Hasty (9); All: Jimmy Hasty (19)
Home colours

Dundalk entered the 1962–63 season on the back of a disappointing eighth-place finish in the League and a fifth-place finish in the Shield the previous season. 1962–63 saw the side trained by 1932–33 title-winning veteran Gerry McCourt, assisted by Mickey Fox, Colm Bellew and Shay Noonan. Team selection was still the responsibility of the club's 10-person management committee. It was Dundalk's 37th consecutive season in the top tier of Irish football.

== Season summary ==
The new season would see the 30th anniversary of the club's only previous League title pass. Since then they had been runners-up three times. They had been uncompetitive throughout the 1950s, but had made strong challenges for the League in both 1959–60 and 1960–61. The season opened with the P.J. Casey Cup – a single-season competition run to replace matches lost due to the reduction in teams that season. It ran as a two group, single match round-robin with the top two in each group then playing off in a semi-final and final. The competition was named in memory of P.J. Casey - a long time Honorary Treasurer of the League, and former committee member at Dundalk, who had died in late 1961. Drumcondra defeated Dundalk in the final. The Shield followed, a competition Dundalk had yet to win, and they were pipped to the runners-up spot on goal average. The Dublin City Cup saw them knocked out in the first round, 4–3 on aggregate, while the Leinster Senior Cup saw them knocked out in the semi-final on corner-count after a 2–2 draw with Shelbourne.

With four competitions essentially dealt with by the time the League was up and running, all attention turned to the League schedule. A run of five wins and a draw saw Dundalk lead the table going into the new year, but a defeat and three draws in their next five games raised doubts about their ability to stay in front. Their rivals were faltering too, however, and with six games remaining Dundalk led by four points – although their closest rivals, Waterford and Drumcondra, both had two games in hand, as bad weather that winter had seen a number of postponements. Another slump in form followed, with a second round exit in the FAI Cup to Cork Hibernians and two League defeats in three weeks, leaving them top on goal average only with an extra game played. But they rallied as their rivals continued to drop points, needing a win away to Bohemians in their final match to seal the title. They went two goals behind, however, and with supporters believing they had blown the title, they came back to score twice in the last five minutes and secure a point. They then had to wait a full week for the fixture backlog to clear, with Shelbourne, Cork Celtic and Drumcondra all in the hunt. All three faltered, confirming Dundalk as Champions.

=== First-Team Squad (1962–63) ===
| No. | Name | Years | League | FAI Cup | League of Ireland Shield | Other^{a} | Total | Goals |
|---|---|---|---|---|---|---|---|---|
| 1 | (Republic of Ireland) Christy Barron | 1959–1967 | 18 | 2 | 9 | 11 | 40 | 0 |
| 2 | (Republic of Ireland) John Murphy | 1957–1969 | 16 | 1 | 8 | 11 | 36 | 3 |
| 3 | (Republic of Ireland) Tom Lyons | 1961–1966 | 18 | 2 | 7 | 8 | 35 | 1 |
| 4 | (Republic of Ireland) Patsy McKeown | 1957–1968 | 17 | 2 | 9 | 11 | 39 | 0 |
| 5 | (Republic of Ireland) Tommy Rowe | 1962–1965 | 18 | 2 | 2 | 10 | 32 | 2 |
| 6 | (Northern Ireland) Ted Harte | 1959–1964 | 17 | 2 | 3 | 7 | 29 | 1 |
| 7 | (Republic of Ireland) Francie Callan | 1954–1967 | 16 | 2 | 9 | 9 | 36 | 12 |
| 8 | (Republic of Ireland) Billy Kennedy | 1962–1966 | 13 | 1 | 8 | 10 | 32 | 5 |
| 9 | (Northern Ireland) Dermot Cross | 1961–1964 | 14 | 1 | 7 | 7 | 29 | 10 |
| 10 | (Republic of Ireland) Leo O'Reilly | 1962–1966 | 10 | 1 | 9 | 11 | 31 | 11 |
| 11 | (Northern Ireland) Jimmy Hasty | 1960–1966 | 13 | 2 | 5 | 7 | 27 | 19 |
| 12 | (Republic of Ireland) Stan Pownall | 1962–1964 | 9 | 1 | 5 | 9 | 24 | 3 |
| 13 | (Republic of Ireland) James Redmond | 1962–1963 | 16 | 2 | 0 | 1 | 19 | 6 |
| 14 | (Republic of Ireland) Davy McArdle | 1960–1964 | 3 | 1 | 5 | 6 | 15 | 3 |

a. Includes the Leinster Senior Cup, Dublin City Cup, P.J. Casey Cup, and Top Four Cup.

== Competitions ==
=== P.J. Casey Cup ===
Group

| 19 August 1962 | Dundalk | 3–2 | St Patrick's Athletic | Dundalk |
| | | | | Stadium: Oriel Park |

| 26 August 1962 | Dundalk | 1–1 | Shelbourne | Dundalk |
| | | | | Stadium: Oriel Park |

| 30 August 1962 | Shamrock Rovers | 1–4 | Dundalk | Dublin |
| | | | | Stadium: Dalymount Park |

| 30 August 1962 | Drumcondra | 5–3 | Dundalk | Dublin |
| | | | | Stadium: Tolka Park |

Dundalk qualified as group runners-up

Semi-final

| 5 September 1962 | Dundalk | 1–0 | Waterford | Dublin |
| | | | | Stadium: Dalymount Park |

Final

| 12 September 1962 | Drumcondra | 3–0 | Dundalk | Dublin |
| | | | | Stadium: Dalymount Park |

=== Shield ===
| 9 September 1962 Round 1 | Cork Celtic | 1–2 | Dundalk |

| 16 September 1962 Round 2 | Dundalk | 2–7 | Waterford |

| 23 September 1962 Round 3 | Drumcondra | 1–1 | Dundalk |

| 30 September 1962 Round 4 | Dundalk | 2–1 | St Patrick's Athletic |

| 7 October 1962 Round 5 | Shelbourne | 0–4 | Dundalk |

| 14 October 1962 Round 6 | Dundalk | 1–4 | Shamrock Rovers |

| 21 October 1962 Round 7 | Limerick | 3–2 | Dundalk |

| 28 October 1962 Round 8 | Dundalk | 1–1 | Cork Hibernians |

| 4 November 1962 Round 9 | Bohemians | 1–3 | Dundalk |

==== Shield table ====
| Pos | Team | Pld | W | D | L | GF | GA | GD | Pts |
|---|---|---|---|---|---|---|---|---|---|
| 1 | Shamrock Rovers | 9 | 8 | 0 | 1 | 33 | 11 | +22 | 16 |
| 2 | Cork Celtic | 9 | 5 | 0 | 4 | 17 | 15 | +2 | 10 |
| 3 | Dundalk | 9 | 4 | 2 | 3 | 18 | 19 | −1 | 10 |
| 4 | Cork Hibernians | 9 | 3 | 3 | 3 | 12 | 19 | −7 | 9 |
| 5 | Waterford | 9 | 3 | 2 | 4 | 22 | 18 | +4 | 8 |
| 6 | Bohemians | 9 | 3 | 2 | 4 | 18 | 27 | −9 | 8 |
| 7 | Limerick | 9 | 4 | 0 | 5 | 15 | 21 | −6 | 8 |
| 8 | Drumcondra | 9 | 2 | 3 | 4 | 17 | 17 | 0 | 7 |
| 9 | St Patrick's Athletic | 9 | 3 | 1 | 5 | 17 | 17 | 0 | 7 |
| 10 | Shelbourne | 9 | 3 | 1 | 5 | 17 | 22 | −5 | 7 |

Source: Irish Press

=== Dublin City Cup ===
First round

| 11 November 1962 | Cork Hibernians | 2–1 | Dundalk | Cork |
| | | | | Stadium: Flower Lodge |

| 18 November 1962 | Dundalk | 2–2 | Cork Hibernians | Dundalk |
| | | | | Stadium: Oriel Park |

Cork Hibernians won 4–3 on aggregate

=== Leinster Senior Cup ===
Fourth round

| 14 November 1962 | Dundalk | 5–1 | Workmen's Club | Dublin |
| | | | | Stadium: Tolka Park |

Semi-final

| 20 December 1962 | Shelbourne | 2–2 | Dundalk | Dublin |
| | | | | Stadium: Dalymount Park |

Shelbourne won 8–2 on corner count

=== FAI Cup ===
First round

| 17 February 1963 | Dundalk | 2–0 | Waterford | Dundalk |
| | | | | Stadium: Oriel Park |

Second round

| 10 March 1963 | Dundalk | 1–2 | Cork Hibernians | Dundalk |
| | | | | Stadium: Oriel Park |

=== Top Four Cup ===
Semi-final

| 28 April 1963 | Dundalk | 0–1 | Drumcondra | Dublin |
| | | | | Stadium: Dalymount Park |

=== League ===
| 25 November 1962 Round 1 | Dundalk | 2–1 | Cork Celtic |

| 2 December 1962 Round 2 | Waterford | 2–3 | Dundalk |

| 9 December 1962 Round 3 | Dundalk | 5–2 | Drumcondra |

| 16 December 1962 Round 4 | St Patrick's Athletic | 2–2 | Dundalk |

| 23 December 1962 Round 5 | Dundalk | 2–1 | Shelbourne |

| 6 January 1963 Round 7 | Dundalk | 3–0 | Limerick |

| 13 January 1963 Round 8 | Cork Hibernians | 1–0 | Dundalk |

| 20 January 1963 Round 9 | Dundalk | 5–1 | Bohemians |

| 27 January 1963 Round 10 | Cork Celtic | 2–2 | Dundalk |

| 3 February 1963 Round 11 | Dundalk | 2–2 | Waterford |

| 10 February 1963 Round 12 | Drumcondra | 0–0 | Dundalk |

| 24 February 1963 Round 13 | Dundalk | 4–1 | St Patrick's Athletic |

| 3 March 1963 Round 14 | Shelbourne | 2–1 | Dundalk |

| 17 March 1963 Round 6 | Dundalk | 1–3 | Shamrock Rovers |

| 24 March 1963 Round 15 | Limerick | 0–2 | Dundalk |

| 27 March 1963 Round 16 | Shamrock Rovers | 1–1 | Dundalk |

| 31 March 1963 Round 17 | Dundalk | 2–0 | Cork Hibernians |

| 4 April 1963 Round 18 | Bohemians | 2–2 | Dundalk |

==== League table ====
| Pos | Team | Pld | W | D | L | GF | GA | GD | Pts | Qualification |
|---|---|---|---|---|---|---|---|---|---|---|
| 1 | Dundalk | 18 | 9 | 6 | 3 | 39 | 23 | +16 | 24 | European Cup |
| 2 | Waterford | 18 | 10 | 3 | 5 | 50 | 37 | +13 | 23 | |
| 3 | Drumcondra | 18 | 10 | 3 | 5 | 33 | 27 | +6 | 23 | |
| 4 | Cork Celtic | 18 | 6 | 9 | 3 | 33 | 22 | +11 | 21 | |
| 5 | Shamrock Rovers | 18 | 7 | 5 | 6 | 36 | 25 | +11 | 19 | Fairs Cup |
| 6 | Cork Hibernians | 18 | 7 | 4 | 7 | 22 | 25 | −3 | 18 | |
| 7 | Shelbourne | 18 | 7 | 4 | 7 | 29 | 35 | −6 | 18 | Cup Winners' Cup |
| 8 | Limerick | 18 | 5 | 3 | 10 | 22 | 30 | −8 | 13 | |
| 9 | St Patrick's Athletic | 18 | 4 | 5 | 9 | 23 | 47 | −24 | 13 | |
| 10 | Bohemians | 18 | 1 | 6 | 11 | 19 | 35 | −16 | 8 | |

Source: www.rsssf.com
