= Paddy Roberts (footballer) =

Irish footballer (1939–2022)

Personal information
- Full name: Patrick Roberts
- Date of birth: 24 May 1939
- Place of birth: Drimnagh, Dublin, Ireland
- Date of death: 26 February 2022 (aged 82)
- Place of death: Beaumont, Dublin, Ireland
- Position: Central midfielder

Senior career*
Years	Team	Apps	(Gls)
1960–1969	Shelbourne		

International career
- League of Ireland XI
- * Club domestic league appearances and goals

Patrick Roberts (24 May 1939 – 26 February 2022) was an Irish footballer who played for Shelbourne in the League of Ireland. As an international, he also played for the League of Ireland XI.

== Career ==
Roberts lined out for Shelbourne from 1960 to 1969, making almost 150 League of Ireland appearances. He made his league debut at the end of the 1959–60 season and was a member of Shelbourne's 1961–62 league-winning team. A runner-up in the FAI Cup final in 1962, when Shelbourne lost to Shamrock Rovers, Roberts earned a winner's medal in 1963 after scoring in the 2–0 win over Cork Hibernians. He also lined out when Shelbourne entered European competitions for the first time, most notably against Sporting CP in the 1962–63 European Cup and against Barcelona in the 1963–64 European Cup Winners' Cup. Roberts also earned selection to the League of Ireland XI and was at midfield when the team recorded their sole win over the English Football League XI in October 1963.

== Personal life and death ==
Away from football, Roberts worked as a pastry chef at the Gresham Hotel. He died at Beaumont Hospital on 26 February 2022, aged 82.

== Honours ==
Shelbourne

- League of Ireland: 1961–62
- FAI Cup: 1962–63
