= Peter McDonald (footballer) =

Irish footballer (1924–2022)

Personal information
- Date of birth: 6 January 1924
- Place of birth: Dublin, Ireland
- Date of death: 29 March 2022 (aged 98)
- Place of death: Dublin, Ireland

Senior career*
Years	Team	Apps	(Gls)
- Bohemians
- Transport

International career
1948	Ireland	1	(0)
- * Club domestic league appearances and goals

Peter McDonald (6 January 1924 – 29 March 2022) was an Irish footballer. He competed in the men's tournament at the 1948 Summer Olympics. He played for Bohemians and Transport in the League of Ireland.

He worked for railway company Córas Iompair Éireann until his retirement in the 1980s. A fan of Shelbourne, he volunteered as head groundsman at Tolka Park during the 1990s and 2000s.

Having been the last surviving Irish Olympic Games footballer, McDonald died on 29 March 2022, aged 98.
