= Jimmy Hasty =

Irish footballer

Personal information
- Full name: James Hasty
- Date of birth: 1936
- Place of birth: Belfast, Northern Ireland
- Date of death: 11 October 1974 (aged 37–38)
- Place of death: Belfast, Northern Ireland
- Height: 6 ft 1 in (1.85 m)
- Position: Forward

Senior career*
Years	Team	Apps	(Gls)
1959–1960	Newry Town		(55)
1960–1966	Dundalk	98	(59)
1966–1967	Drogheda	10	(3)
- * Club domestic league appearances and goals

James Hasty (1936 – 11 October 1974) was a Northern Irish footballer who is best known for his time playing as a forward for Dundalk between 1960 and 1966. He was nicknamed 'the One-Armed Wonder' because he had lost his left arm in a workplace accident prior to his career in football. He was murdered in a sectarian killing in Belfast in October 1974 during the Troubles.

== Early life ==
Jimmy Hasty was born in Belfast in 1936 and was raised in the Sailortown area of the city. In July 1950, when he was 14 years old, he lost his left arm in an industrial accident on his first day at work at Jennymount Mill in Belfast. He later received £1,200 in compensation.

== Career ==
Hasty played for several junior football clubs in the Belfast area during the late 1950s, before joining Newry Town in the Irish League second tier in October 1959. He scored twice on his debut for Newry against Derry City Reserves and went on to be Newry's top goalscorer with 38 goals as they won the 1959–60 Irish League B Division.

He started the following season in the same vein, scoring a further 17 goals, including four in a 5-1 win over Crusaders Reserves in his final game for Newry before being transferred to Dundalk in November 1960. His reputation as a prolific goalscorer with Newry, who had learned to use his injury to his advantage on the pitch, had attracted Dundalk Director Jim Malone. When Malone saw Hasty play, he was so confident in his ability that he offered to personally cover the cost of the signing in front of a sceptical board.

Hasty made a scoring debut against Cork Celtic at Oriel Park, and scored six more goals in the next four league matches. Five weeks after his debut, he scored the only goal in the Leinster Senior Cup final, Dundalk's second time winning the competition. He quickly became a star attraction, with spectators flocking to league grounds all over Ireland to see him play, and his goals helped Dundalk challenge for a League title for the first time in over a decade. His second season was disrupted by injury but he recovered and was the top scorer in the side that won the League in 1962–63, which was the club's first title in 30 years.

The following season, in a European Cup tie away to FC Zürich, he assisted the first goal and scored the second in a 2–1 win, which was the first away victory by an Irish side in European competition. He went on to be joint top-scorer in the league that season, with Dundalk finishing as runners-up, and he scored the opening goal in the Top Four Cup final as they won the competition for the first time.

After two injury-plagued seasons, Hasty was released at the end of the 1965–66 season. He made 170 appearances in all competitions in his six seasons at Dundalk, scoring 103 goals (59 goals in 98 League appearances). He won League, Top Four Cup and Leinster Senior Cup medals and is the sixth-highest goalscorer in the club's history.

After leaving Dundalk, Hasty joined Drogheda for one season before retiring. Both his final appearance and his final goal in the League of Ireland came in February 1967, when he scored for Drogheda against the Dundalk side that would go on to win the League that season.

== Later life ==
Hasty had remained living in Belfast during his League of Ireland career and was living in Hillman Street and working at a betting shop near Belfast docks at the time of his death. He was shot dead on Brougham Street in Belfast on the morning of 11 October 1974 while he was walking to work. The killing was claimed by Loyalist paramilitaries calling themselves the 'Ulster Protestant Action Group' (a cover name for the UVF). No one was ever charged with his murder. Hasty has been the subject of documentaries on RTÉ, BBC and UEFA TV.

Danny Hale, a footballing contemporary of Hasty's, stated that he was single-minded, had great balance for a man over six feet tall, doubled or trebled the attendance no matter where he played and was good enough even to play in goal; another person recalled Hasty as a great swimmer despite his disability.

== Honours ==
Dundalk

- League of Ireland: 1
  - 1962–63
- Top Four Cup: 1
  - 1963–64
- Leinster Senior Cup: 1
  - 1960–61
- LFA President's Cup: 2
  - 1963–64, 1964–65

Newry Town

- Irish League B Division
  - 1959–60
