= Maxie McCann =

Irish footballer (1934–2017)

Personal information
- Date of birth: 4 March 1934
- Place of birth: Dublin, Ireland
- Date of death: 16 November 2017 (aged 83)
- Place of death: Dublin, Ireland
- Position: Outside right

Senior career*
Years	Team	Apps	(Gls)
1952–1954	Clontarf		
1954–1962	Shamrock Rovers	134	(46)
1962–1964	Drumcondra	32	(8)
1964–1965	Dundalk	9	(2)
1965–1966	Transport		

International career
1956	Republic of Ireland	1	(1)
1957–1958	League of Ireland XI	4	(3)
1958	Republic of Ireland B	2	(1)
- * Club domestic league appearances and goals

James "Maxie" McCann (4 March 1934 – 16 November 2017) was an Irish soccer player from Dublin.

McCann joined Shamrock Rovers in 1954 and made his debut on 10 April in a 2–0 win against Bohemians at Dalymount Park having signed the previous week. He scored a hat-trick in his second senior game.

He played for Shamrock Rovers as a winger. He played in European competition for the Milltown club, scoring in a 3–2 defeat for Rovers against Manchester United in a 1957 European Cup preliminary round tie at Old Trafford.

This goal was the first ever scored in European competition by a player representing an Irish club. In total he made two appearances for Rovers in Europe and scored 46 League and 7 FAI Cup goals during his time at Glenmalure Park. He also represented the League of Ireland XI four times scoring three goals.

He won his one and only senior cap for the Republic of Ireland national football team on 25 November 1956, scoring the third goal in a 3–0 win over world champions Germany at Dalymount Park. He won two Republic of Ireland B national football team caps in 1958 scoring the winner in Iceland on his debut.

He shared his benefit with Tommy Hamilton against Sunderland at Dalymount Park on 30 April 1962.

His son Ray played for Bohemians in the 1980s. Of his other sons, Shay had a long career playing in the Athletic Union League, David (Maxie) played his schoolboy football at Belvo, part of the first Belvo team to win an A league in the D.D.S.L, then went on to Leinster Senior and League of Ireland and youngest son Paul played for Sheriff Y.C. His grandson Alan McCann played for St Patrick's Athletic before moving into coaching where he is now at Reading United AC in the US.

In February 2008, McCann, and Liam Hennessy were invited to the Munich commemoration at Manchester United.

McCann died in Dublin on 16 November 2017, at the age of 83.

== Sources ==
- Paul Doolan; Robert Goggins. The Hoops. ISBN 0-7171-2121-6.
- Shamrock Rovers programme 29 August 2008
