= Patsy Dorgan =

Irish footballer (1936–2021)

Personal information
- Full name: Patrick Dorgan
- Date of birth: 22 March 1936
- Place of birth: Cork, Ireland
- Date of death: 27 December 2021 (aged 85)
- Place of death: Trinidad
- Position: Centre-half

Youth career
- Glasheen

Senior career*
Years	Team	Apps	(Gls)
1954–1957	Blackburn Rovers		
1957–1966	Cork Hibernians		
1966–1967	Cork Celtic		
- * Club domestic league appearances and goals

Patrick Dorgan (22 March 1936 – 27 December 2021) was an Irish footballer who played for several clubs in both the League of Ireland and the English League, most notably, Blackburn Rovers, Cork Hibernians and Cork Celtic.

== Career ==
Born in Cork, Dorgan first came to prominence on the Glasheen team who beat Home Farm in the FAI Youth Cup. Blackburn Rovers manager Jackie Carey was impressed with the young Dorgan and within weeks he was signed to the English club. After three years at Blackburn and shortly after the start of the 1957–58 season he signed for League of Ireland debutants Cork Hibernians. In 1966 Dorgan moved to Cork Celtic when their centre half John Coughlan retired. His tenure here was brief, however, he continued to play with the Aer Lingus team in the Cork Shipping League, until the mid-1980s.

== Honours ==
Glasheen

- FAI Youth Cup: 1953–54
