= Mick Cahill =

Irish former footballer

Personal information
- Date of birth: 1938 (age 87–88)
- Place of birth: Dublin, Ireland
- Position: Centre-half

Senior career*
Years	Team	Apps	(Gls)
1956–1962	Bohemians	?	(0)
1962–1965	Shamrock Rovers	13	(0)
1965–1966	Transport	?	(?)
1966–1967	Drumcondra	25	(1)
1967–1970	Bohemians	29	(0)
1970–1971	St Patrick's Athletic	2	(0)

International career
1960–1962	League of Ireland XI	6	(0)
- * Club domestic league appearances and goals

Mick Cahill (born 1938 in Dublin) is an Irish former footballer who played as a centre half.

== Biography ==
He joined Shamrock Rovers in 1962 from Bohemians. He captained Bohs in 1961/62 during his time at Dalymount Park, five years before his brother Paul would do so. They joined a prestigious list of brothers such as the Hoopers, O'Kanes and Kerrs who captained The Gypsies. Mick received two amateur international caps and captained his country against England in February 1961 in a 1–1 draw in Dalymount Park. He played twice in the UEFA Cup Winners' Cup for Rovers before signing for Transport F.C. in 1965 and later playing for Drumcondra.

== Personal life ==
Cahill was a successful greyhound racing owner during the 1980s, winning various open races.

== Sources ==
- Paul Doolan; Robert Goggins (1993). The Hoops. Gill & MacMillan. ISBN 0-7171-2121-6.
- Bohemian F.C. Match Programme, 29 January 1989
