= Danny Hale (footballer) =

Northern Irish footballer (1941–2026)

Personal information
- Date of birth: 1 July 1941
- Place of birth: Belfast, Northern Ireland
- Date of death: 4 February 2026 (aged 84)
- Height: 5 ft 7 in (1.70 m)
- Position: Forward

Youth career
- St Malachy's
- Cranburn Stars
- Lisnagarvey Strollers

Senior career*
Years	Team	Apps	(Gls)
1959–1961	Cliftonville	52	(20)
1961–1962	Glentoran	8	(3)
1962–1966	Crusaders		(143)
1966–1968	Dundalk	81	(43)
1968–1971	Derry City		(104)
1971–1972	Ards		(11)
Total			(324)

International career
1960–1965	Northern Ireland amateur	3	(0)
- * Club domestic league appearances and goals

Daniel Hale (1 July 1941 – 4 February 2026) was a Northern Irish footballer who played as a forward. He was a prolific goalscorer both in the Irish League and the League of Ireland, becoming top scorer in each league. He netted over 300 times in a career spanning 13 seasons.

== Club career ==
Raised in Carrick Hill in north Belfast, Hale played for St Malachy's, Cranburn Stars, Lisnagarvey Strollers, Cliftonville, Glentoran, Crusaders, Dundalk, Derry City and Ards. His senior debut came at Solitude on 15 August 1959, when he scored for Cliftonville against Coleraine. He won an Intermediate Cup medal for Glentoran.

At Crusaders, he scored an "incredible" 55 times in the 1965–66 season, which remains a club record. Crusaders later named an enclosure in their North Stand in his honour. Hale rates Crusaders' stalwart winger Arthur "Mousey" Brady as one of his very best playing partners.

Following the release of fellow Belfast man Jimmy Hasty by Dundalk, Hale was persuaded by manager Alan Fox to come south and become the team's centre forward. He was joint top scorer in the League of Ireland in the 1966–67 season, with 15 goals, as Dundalk became league champions. In 1967, Hale scored in Hungary for Dundalk, becoming the first Irishman to score behind the Iron Curtain. He was the supporters' player of the year that season. At Dundalk, his nickname was "Red Sand Dan". Hale trained in Belfast while playing for Dundalk.

Hale scored 104 goals in three seasons of "very happy memories" at Derry City from 1969 to 1971 (45, 25, 34). His 45 goals in 1968–69 remain a record for the club. Twenty-one league goals made him top goalscorer in the Irish League, with Derry finishing runners-up. He was part of the Derry City team that reached the Irish Cup final in 1971. Hale's favourite goal for Derry was scored against Coleraine in the North-West Cup. His most difficult centre-half opponent was Davy Jackson of Coleraine.

== International career ==
Hale won three caps with Northern Ireland amateur national team.

== Style of play ==
One journalist who saw Hale wrote: 'He didn't score beautiful goals ... No, Danny was a penalty box player, a "sniffer", as they were called. A player with an instinct for goals ... goals were his bread and butter. Danny, at the level he played north and south of the border, was one of the best in the game'.

== Personal life and death ==
Educated by the Christian Brothers, Hale worked as a chemist's message boy in the 1950s; a contemporary recalled that he played Gaelic football and hurling for the Pearse's Club and was a swimmer and runner. Hale had two elder brothers, Gerry and Jackie, who played for Crusaders before him; his grandsons Rory and Ronan would also represent the club. He married Kathleen and they had three children: Gerard who pre-deceased him, Kathy and Danny. He was a grandfather and great-grandfather. After football, Hale worked as an upholstering instructor, in which profession he had served his time. For many years, Hale organised trips with the New Lodge Celtic Club based originally in the Circle club to see his favourite team Celtic in Glasgow. He was honorary president of Newington Football Club. His son Danny Jnr played for Distillery. In May 2024, Hale was in the stand as footballer-grandsons Rory and Ronan helped Cliftonville win the Irish Cup.

Hale died at home in Eia Street, Belfast, on 4 February 2026, at the age of 84. Hundreds of mourners attended Hale's funeral Mass in Holy Family Catholic Church, Newington, on 11 February 2026, where grandsons Rory and Ronan led the prayers of the faithful. Tributes paid to Hale attested to the high regard in which he was held throughout football.
