= Paul Flood =

Irish former professional footballer

Personal information
- Full name: Paul Anthony Flood
- Date of birth: 29 June 1948 (age 78)
- Place of birth: Dublin, Ireland
- Height: 5 ft 8 in (1.73 m)
- Position: Forward

Youth career
- 1964–1965: Coventry City

Senior career*
Years	Team	Apps	(Gls)
1965–196?	Drogheda		(1)
196?–1967	Bohemians		(9)
1967–1971	Brighton & Hove Albion	35	(7)
1971–197?	Tonbridge		
- Eastbourne United
1976–1977	Horsham		
- Southwick
- Worthing
1983–1984	Horsham		
- Peacehaven & Telscombe

International career
1967	Republic of Ireland amateur	1	(0)
- * Club domestic league appearances and goals

Paul Anthony Flood (born 29 June 1948) is an Irish former professional footballer who played as a forward in the English Football League for Brighton & Hove Albion. He was capped by his country at schoolboy, youth and amateur level, appeared in the League of Ireland for Drogheda and Bohemians, and later played non-league football in the Sussex area.

== Life and career ==
Flood was born in Dublin in 1948. He represented his country at schoolboy and youth level, and spent time with English club Coventry City as a youngster. When he returned to Ireland, still only 16, he played and scored for Drogheda in the 1964–65 League of Ireland season, and then moved on to Bohemians. To add to his nine League of Ireland goals in 1966–67, he scored the winning goal in that season's Leinster Senior Cup final, and his performances were rewarded with selection for the Republic of Ireland amateur team for a friendly against England in March 1967.

The 18-year-old Flood returned to England in June 1967 and signed for Brighton & Hove Albion of the Football League Third Division. He never established himself as a first-team regular, contributing eight goals from 39 competitive appearances over four seasons. In 1971, he left the club for Tonbridge of the Southern League: he scored 28 goals from 246 appearances, during which he played in defence and midfield as well as his original forward position, and was a member of the team that won the 1974–75 Kent Senior Cup. He then played for Sussex-based non-league clubs including Eastbourne United, Horsham (two spells), Southwick, Worthing – helping the sixth-tier Isthmian League side reach the second round of the 1982–83 FA Cup – and Peacehaven & Telscombe. He worked in insurance.
