= Ben O'Sullivan =

Irish footballer

Ben O'Sullivan was an Irish soccer player during the 1960s and 1970s.

== Career ==
He played for Bohemians (two spells), Derry City and St. Patrick's Athletic during his career in the League of Ireland and made 1 appearance for Bohs in European competition. O'Sullivan was an ace goalscorer whose best season for Bohs came in 1966/67 when he netted 22 times in all competitions (9 league goals). This marginally eclipsed his previous season's total of 21 goals (10 league goals).

He made his debut for Bohemians in 1965 and spent the next 3 years at Dalymount Park before signing for Derry City. He returned to Bohs in 1969 and helped them win the FAI Cup in 1970. After 84 goals in 214 appearances Ben went to St. Pats, winning a runners-up medal in the 1974 FAI Cup Final against Finn Harps.
