= Martin Colfer =

Republic of Ireland footballer (died 2015)

Senior career*
Years	Team	Apps	(Gls)
- St James's Gate
1948–1956	Shelbourne	100	(41)

International career
1950–1951	Republic of Ireland	2	(0)
1950–1951	League of Ireland XI	7	(0)
- * Club domestic league appearances and goals

Martin Colfer (died 25 September 2015) was a Republic of Ireland soccer international, who played with Shelbourne for seven seasons in the 1950s.

== Football career ==
Colfer began his career with St James's Gate. From there he transferred to Shelbourne in the 1948–49 season and played 100 league games and 12 FAI Cup games between that and the 1955–56 season. He became Shelbourne's top scorer, scoring a total of 41 goals for the club and was the club's top scorer in three of the seven seasons he played for them.

Dublin born Colfer was capped twice for the Republic of Ireland at senior level, away to Belgium in May 1950 and Norway the following year, while also winning seven inter-League caps.

He was on the losing side in two FAI Cup finals with Shelbourne in 1949 and 1951 but played in the League of Ireland title winning team in the 1952–53 season.
