= Brendan Carroll (footballer) =

Irish footballer

Personal information
- Full name: Brendan Carroll
- Place of birth: Bray, County Wicklow, Ireland
- Position: Centre-forward

Senior career*
Years	Team	Apps	(Gls)
1944–1946	Bray Wanderers		
1946–1947	Bohemians	1	(0)
1947–1950	Shelbourne	32	(23)
1950–1951	Transport	9	(2)
1951–1957	Bray Wanderers		

International career
1949	Republic of Ireland	2	(0)
1949	League of Ireland XI	2	(0)
- * Club domestic league appearances and goals

Brendan Carroll (died 14 June 2007) was an Irish professional football player in the League of Ireland.

He played for Bray Wanderers from 1944 before moving to Bohemians briefly on his way to a successful career at Shelbourne whom he joined in 1947. He was top scorer for Shelbourne in seasons 1947/48 and 1948/49 and was also twice picked for his national team.

Carroll made two appearances for the Republic of Ireland national football team. He made his international debut on 24 April 1949 in a 2–0 defeat to Belgium at Dalymount Park.
