= Republic of Ireland national football B team =

Irish national football reserve team

Republic of Ireland B
- Nickname: The Boys in Green
- Association: Football Association of Ireland
- Confederation: UEFA (Europe)
- Head coach: Pat Devlin
- Captain: Alex Bruce
- Top scorer: Christy Doyle; Daryl Clare; David Kelly; Jackie Hennessy; Neale Fenn; Niall Quinn (all 2 goals each)
- Home stadium: Dalymount Park; Lansdowne Road; Tolka Park; Turner's Cross; Carlisle Grounds
- FIFA code: IRL
First colours	Second colours	Third colours

First international
- Republic of Ireland 1–0 Romania (Dublin, Ireland; October 20, 1957)

Biggest win
- Republic of Ireland 4–1 England (Cork, Ireland; March 27, 1990)

Biggest defeat
- England 2–0 Republic of Ireland (Liverpool, England; December 1, 1994)

The Republic of Ireland national football B team is the reserve team of the Republic of Ireland national football team. There are no competitions for B teams. However, since 1957 the Football Association of Ireland has arranged occasional friendlies.

== History ==
=== Early B internationals ===
The FAI first introduced B internationals during the 1950s. In an era when League of Ireland players were getting fewer opportunities to break into the senior team, these games were seen as a chance for these players to gain some international experience. The Republic of Ireland B played their first game on October 20, 1957 at Dalymount Park against Romania B. They held the visitors to a 1–1 draw. Three days later, on October 23, the Romanians lost 6–0 to a Northern Ireland B team.

In August 1958 a Republic of Ireland B team travelled to Reykjavík and beat Iceland 3–2. Then in September 1960, Iceland made a return visit to Dalymount Park, this time losing 2–1. On both occasions Iceland fielded their senior team and the Football Association of Iceland regard these games as full internationals. In between the two games against Iceland, the Republic of Ireland B also beat South Africa 1–0 at Tolka Park. The South Africans also regard this as a full international. Several League of Ireland players who played in these games subsequently played for the senior Republic of Ireland team. These included Christy Doyle, who had scored against both Iceland and South Africa, Jackie Hennessy who had scored twice against Iceland and Liam Tuohy.

After the game against Iceland in 1960 it would be thirty years before a Republic of Ireland B team officially played again. However, on May 24, 1971, the FAI, celebrating its Golden Jubilee arranged a special game at Lansdowne Road. This should have been a full international, however their opponents, England, only sent a B team. Steve Heighway scored for an unofficial Republic of Ireland B team in the subsequent 1–1 draw.

=== 1990s ===
Under Jack Charlton, B internationals were revived and during the 1990s the Republic of Ireland B played England B twice. They recorded their biggest win to date when they beat England B 4–1 at Turner's Cross on March 27, 1990. However four years later England B avenged this defeat when they beat the Republic of Ireland B 2–0 at Anfield on December 1, 1994. This remains their biggest defeat to date.

In between the two games against England B, the Republic of Ireland B also beat Denmark B 2–0 at Tolka Park on February 12, 1992. Under Mick McCarthy, the Republic of Ireland B played a further three games, including two against a League of Ireland XI and one against a Northern Ireland B team.

=== From 2006 ===
In April 2006 the FAI announced that Pat Devlin would join the management team of Steve Staunton as manager of the Republic of Ireland B and as League of Ireland co-ordinator. The intention was for Devlin to monitor players in the league, report on potential international players and introduce them to international football at B level. Since then the Republic of Ireland B has played and drawn with Scotland B twice. In 2008, a team playing as Republic of Ireland XI overcame Nottingham Forest at Dalymount Park. This team was, in effect, an Ireland B team.

== Results ==
October 20, 1957

Republic of Ireland B	1–1	Romania B
Neville		Semenescu

Dalymount Park, Dublin, Ireland
Friendly
Attendance: 21,500
Referee: Kelly (England)

August 11, 1958

Iceland	2–3	Republic of Ireland B
Björgvinsson; Þórðarson		Doyle; Nolan; McCann

Laugardalsvöllur, Reykjavík, Iceland
Friendly

October 11, 1958

Republic of Ireland B	1–0	South Africa
Doyle

Tolka Park, Dublin, Ireland
Friendly
Attendance: 19,000

September 11, 1960

Republic of Ireland B	2–1	Iceland
Hennessy		Beck

Dalymount Park, Dublin, Ireland
Friendly

May 24, 1971

Republic of Ireland B	1–1	England B
Heighway		Wagstaff

Lansdowne Road, Dublin, Ireland
Friendly
Referee: Davidson (Scotland)

March 27, 1990

Republic of Ireland B	4–1	England B
McLoughlin; Kelly (pen.); Quinn		Atkinson

Turner's Cross, Cork, Ireland
Friendly
Attendance: 10,000
Referee: Cooper (Wales)

February 12, 1992

Republic of Ireland B	2–0	Denmark B
Fenlon; Kelly

Tolka Park, Dublin, Ireland
Friendly
Attendance: 4,000
Referee: Gifford (Wales)

December 13, 1994

England B	2–0	Republic of Ireland B
Cole; Fowler

Anfield, Liverpool, England
Friendly
Attendance: 7,431
Referee: Hugh Dallas (Scotland)

March 17, 1997

Republic of Ireland B	1–1	(Republic of Ireland) League of Ireland XI
Dominic Foley		Pat Morley

Tolka Park, Dublin, Ireland
Friendly
Referee: Barr (Irish Football Association)

February 11, 1998

Republic of Ireland B	0–1	Northern Ireland B
		O'Boyle

Tolka Park, Dublin, Ireland
Friendly
Attendance: 10,000
Referee: Richards (Wales)

February 9, 1999

Republic of Ireland B	4–3	(Republic of Ireland) League of Ireland XI
Fenn; Clare		Coughlan; Gormley (pen.); Tony Cousins

Carlisle Grounds, Bray, Ireland
Friendly
Referee: Perry (Ireland)

November 14, 2006

Republic of Ireland B	0–0	Scotland B
	Report

Dalymount Park, Dublin, Ireland
Friendly
Attendance: 3,000
Referee: Martin Atkinson (England)

November 20, 2007

Scotland B	1–1	Republic of Ireland B
Howard	Report	Byrne

Excelsior Stadium, Airdrie, Scotland
Friendly
Referee: Joseph Attard (Malta)

October 9, 2008

Republic of Ireland B	2–0	(England) Nottingham Forest F.C.
Folan; Keogh	Report

Dalymount Park, Dublin, Ireland
Friendly
Attendance: 4,040
Referee: Damien Hancock (Republic of Ireland)

== See also ==
- Category:Republic of Ireland B international footballers
