= Carl Davenport =

English footballer

Personal information
- Full name: Carl Davenport
- Date of birth: 30 May 1944
- Place of birth: Farnworth, England
- Position: Centre forward

Senior career*
Years	Team	Apps	(Gls)
	Bolton Wanderers	0	(0)
1962–1963	Preston North End	0	(0)
1963	Stockport County	16	(3)
1963–1965	Wigan Athletic		
1965–1967	Macclesfield Town	45	(38)
1967–1968	Cork Celtic		(24)
1968–1971	Cork Hibernians		(18)
1971–1972	Cork Celtic		(3)
1972	Limerick		(1)
1973	St Patrick's Athletic		(4)
1974–197?	Cork Celtic		(3)
1976–1977	Horwich R.M.I.		(?)
1977–1978	Radcliffe Borough	18	(8)
- * Club domestic league appearances and goals

Carl Davenport (born 30 May 1944) is an English former footballer who played as a centre forward in the Football League for Stockport County. He played non-league football in England, before enjoying a successful career in the League of Ireland.

== Life and career ==
Born in Farnworth, which was then in Lancashire, Davenport was on the books of Bolton Wanderers and Preston North End, without making a league appearance for either, before joining Stockport. He then played for Cheshire League clubs Wigan Athletic and Macclesfield Town.

He then moved to Ireland, where at the age of 23 he became player-manager of Cork Celtic, was the League of Ireland's joint top scorer in 1967–68, went on to play for Cork Hibernians, Limerick and St Patrick's Athletic, and was capped twice for the League of Ireland Representative XI.

Upon returning to England he turned out for Horwich R.M.I. and Radcliffe Borough, before retiring.

In 2003, Bolton Wanderers played a Cork All Stars XI in Davenport's testimonial match.
