= Gerry Moore =

English jazz pianist (1903–1993)

Gerald Asher Moore (8 October 1903, London – 29 January 1993, Twickenham) was an English jazz pianist.

Moore spent the years 1922-1939 working freelance in London, playing movie palaces and nightclubs. Among the clubs in which he worked are Sherry’s (1925–26), the Empress Rooms (1927), Chez Rex Evans (1933–34), the Bag o’ Nails (1932–36), the 43 Club (1934–35), and Mema’s (1934–39). His first live appearance on BBC radio in September 1936 was heralded in The Radio Times with a listing as "Britain's 'King of Swing'". In 1939, he worked with Buddy Featherstonhaugh, from 1940 until 1942 with Adelaide Hall, and in 1945 with Vic Lewis. He worked in Europe late in the 1940s, including in Germany with Max Geldray (1947), at the Paris Jazz Fair with Carlo Krahmer (1949), and at the Palm Beach Hotel in Cannes (1948–50). He played with Harry Gold and Laurie Gold in 1954-57 and worked as a pianist on the Queen Mary (1957) and Caronia (1959–63). From the mid-1960s up until his death, Moore played at clubs in London.
