= Austin Noonan =

Irish footballer (1933–2022)

Personal information
- Date of birth: 16 July 1933
- Place of birth: Cork, Ireland
- Date of death: 7 November 2022 (aged 89)
- Place of death: Cork, Ireland
- Position: Attacking midfielder

Senior career*
Years	Team	Apps	(Gls)
1953–1966	Evergreen United / Cork Celtic		
1966–1969	Cork Hibernians		

International career
- League of Ireland XI
- * Club domestic league appearances and goals

Austin Noonan (16 July 1933 – 7 November 2022) was an Irish football player and manager who played for Cork Celtic and Cork Hibernians in the League of Ireland. He also served as manager of Cork Hibernians.

== Career ==
Noonan first played football as a schoolboy with Maymount. Considered too small and light as a youth player, he later played with Colmcille's and Ballinlough before being selected on the Cork AUL.

Noonan signed for Evergreen United (later Cork Celtic) for the 1953–54 season. He formed a close goal-scoring partnership with Donie Leahy and, after spending much of the 1958-59 season on the sideline with a troublesome right ankle injury, was the league's overall top scorer with 27 goals the following season. Noonan was honoured by the League of Ireland XI selectors on a couple of occasions, while his other honours include Top Four Cup, Shield, Dublin City Cup and Munster Senior Cup winners' medals.

Noonan transferred to local rivals Cork Hibernians in 1966 before taking over as manager. He has the distinction of being the club's manager in 1970 when their Shield victory qualified them to play in a European competition for the first time.

== Death ==
Noonan died on 7 November 2022, at the age of 89.

== Honours ==
Cork Celtic

- League of Ireland Shield: 1960–61
- Dublin City Cup: 1961–62
- Top Four Cup: 1956–57, 1958–59, 1959–60
- Munster Senior League: 1955–56
- Munster Senior Cup: 1959–60, 1961–62, 1963–64
