= Jackie Hennessy =

Irish footballer

Personal information
- Date of birth: 5 October 1940 (age 86)
- Position: Utility player

Youth career
- 1956–1957: Manchester United

Senior career*
Years	Team	Apps	(Gls)
1958	Cork Hibernians	2	(2)
1958–1966	Shelbourne	150	(39)
1966	Derry City	?	(?)
1966–1969	St. Patrick's Athletic	49	(4)
1969–1970	South Coast United	?	(?)
1970–1972	Derry City	?	(?)

International career
1964–1968	Republic of Ireland	5	(0)
1960	Republic of Ireland B	1	(2)
- * Club domestic league appearances and goals

Jackie Hennessy was an Irish footballer who played with St. Patrick's Athletic, Shelbourne and Derry City during his career. He also earned 5 international call-ups to the Republic of Ireland team, debuting during the 1965-66 League of Ireland season against West Germany. In 1960, he scored twice on his only Republic of Ireland B appearance. In 1962 Hennessy scored Shelbourne's first ever goal in European Competition in the 1962-63 European Cup against Sporting CP.
