= Ronnie Whelan (footballer, born 1936) =

Irish footballer

Personal information
- Date of birth: 17 November 1936
- Place of birth: Dublin, Ireland
- Date of death: 16 July 1993 (aged 56)
- Position: Inside forward

Youth career
- Stella Maris
- 19xx–1956: Home Farm

Senior career*
| Years | Team | Apps | (Gls) |
| 1956–1966 | St Patrick's Athletic | 177 | (89) |
| 1965 | → Shamrock Rovers (guest) | | |
| 1966–1974 | Drogheda | 138 | (20) |
| 1974–197x | Córas Iompair Éireann | | |
- Aer Lingus

International career
| 1963–1964 | Republic of Ireland | 2 | (0) |
| 1961–1963 | League of Ireland XI | 2 | (1) |
- * Club domestic league appearances and goals

Ronnie Whelan Sr. (17 November 1936 – 16 July 1993) was a Republic of Ireland international footballer, who played as a forward for several clubs, most notably St. Patrick's Athletic. He is the father of Ronnie Jr. Another son, Paul, and a grandson, Gavin, were also League of Ireland players. Whelan died in July 1993 at the age of 56 from stomach cancer.

== Playing career ==
=== Clubs ===
Two fellow Ireland internationals played a role in the development of Whelan's early career. Legend has it, Whelan was initially "discovered" by the wife of Paddy Moore, who then recommended him to her husband who was coaching Stella Maris at the time. Later Whelan was invited by his neighbour, Liam Whelan, to join him at Home Farm. After an unsuccessful trial with Chelsea, Whelan signed for St Patrick's Athletic. Between 1957 and 1964 he was a prominent member of the St. Pat's forward line and was the club's leading goalscorer in five out of twelve seasons, scoring a total of 89 goals. During this time he helped St. Pat's win the 1958–59 and 1960–61 FAI Cup finals and the 1959–60 League of Ireland Shield. Whelan was awarded a benefit game in May 1963 and in May 1965 he guested for Shamrock Rovers in another benefit game . A run of injuries, effectively ended his St. Pat's career but he subsequently joined Drogheda for a further six seasons, helping them reach the 1970–71 FAI Cup final. While with Drogheda, Whelan also scored a further 20 league goals. He later played for Córas Iompair Éireann (CIÉ) in the League of Ireland B Division and then Aer Lingus of the Leinster Senior League. Whelan also worked for Aer Lingus.

=== Representative career ===
==== Republic of Ireland ====
In the 1963–64 season Whelan made two full appearances for the Republic of Ireland. On 25 September 1963 Whelan played in a European Nations Cup qualifier against Austria. The game finished 0–0. On 24 May 1964 Whelan came on as a substitute after just five minutes for an injured Joe Haverty in a friendly against England at Dalymount Park. Ireland lost this game 3–1.

==== League of Ireland XI ====
Whelan played for the League of Ireland XI on at least two occasions. On 17 March 1961 he played against an Irish League XI. On 2 October 1963 at Dalymount Park, Whelan scored the winner for the League of Ireland XI in a 2–1 win against an English League XI. This English League XI included four players – Ray Wilson, Bobby Moore, Roger Hunt and Martin Peters – who subsequently went on to help England win the 1966 FIFA World Cup. At the time Whelan was working for Unidare, a Finglas-based electrical firm. Whelan subsequently received a warning from his boss at Unidare for taking time off to play in this game.

==== Dublin XI ====
In 1964 Whelan played for a Dublin XI against Liverpool.

== Honours ==
=== St Patrick's Athletic ===
- FAI Cup
  - Winners: 1958–59, 1960–61
- League of Ireland Shield
  - 1959–60

=== Drogheda ===
- FAI Cup
  - Runners-up: 1970–71
