= Ben Hannigan =

Irish footballer (1943–2021)

Personal information
- Date of birth: 3 September 1943
- Place of birth: Dublin, Ireland
- Date of death: 4 February 2021 (aged 77)
- Position: Inside forward

Senior career*
Years	Team	Apps	(Gls)
1961–1965	Shelbourne	75	(35)
1965–1966	Wrexham	7	(2)
1966–1967	Dundalk	21	(14)
1967	Chelmsford City		
1967–1969	Dundalk	30	(19)
1969–1970	Shamrock Rovers	15	(5)
1971	Sligo Rovers	6	(1)
1971	Fortuna Köln	0	(0)
1971–1972	St Patrick's Athletic	5	(2)
1972–1973	Shelbourne	16	(5)
1973–1975	Cork Celtic	29	(6)
1980–1981	Shelbourne	2	(0)

International career
	League of Ireland XI	4	(1)
- * Club domestic league appearances and goals

Ben Hannigan (3 September 1943 – 4 February 2021) was an Irish footballer who played as an inside forward. He spent most of his career playing for Shelbourne in the League of Ireland.

== Career ==
Hannigan had three different spells with Shelbourne as a player from 1961 to 1966, 1972 to 1974, and finally in the 1980–81 season.

His first spell was the most successful as Shels won the league championship in 1962, after defeating Cork Celtic in a play-off and then defeating Cork Hibernians in the following year's FAI Cup final.

In December 1965, he signed for Wrexham but was soon back home with Dundalk where he won the League in 1967. He scored over 50 goals for the Oriel Park side.

Hannigan then signed for Shamrock Rovers in April 1969 and made his debut on 6 April. He won the FAI Cup in his first season and represented Rovers twice in European competition against Schalke 04. In Finn Harps' first ever game in the League of Ireland, Hannigan scored four times in a 10–2 win on 17 August 1969.

Hannigan later signed for Sligo Rovers in February 1971. He scored on his debut on 28 February. In his time at the Showgrounds, he played a total of six games, scoring once. This was followed by a short spell at Fortuna Köln in the early stages of the 1971–72 season, but unlike Noel Campbell, whom Fortuna had signed simultaneously, Hannigan went back home soon.

== Death ==
Hannigan died on 4 February 2021, aged 77.

== Honours ==
Shelbourne

- League of Ireland: 1961–62
- FAI Cup: 1963

Dundalk

- League of Ireland: 1966–67
- Dublin City Cup: 1968

Cork Celtic

- League of Ireland: 1973–74

Shamrock Rovers

- FAI Cup: 1969
