= Christy Doyle =

Irish footballer

Personal information
- Position: Forward

Senior career*
| Years | Team | Apps | (Gls) |
| 1957–1962 | Shelbourne | | |

International career
| 1959 | Republic of Ireland MNT | 1 | (0) |
- * Club domestic league appearances and goals

Christy Doyle was an Irish footballer who played as a forward for Shelbourne FC from 1957 to 1961, scoring 36 goals in 60 League of Ireland appearances.

Doyle helped Shelbourne to their FAI Cup victory in 1960 as they defeated Cork Hibernians 2–0 in the final at Dalymount Park.

Doyle won two caps for the Republic of Ireland B national team scoring on both appearances (against Iceland and South Africa) and won a single cap for the senior team against Czechoslovakia. He also won two inter-league caps against the Irish League (scoring) and the English Football League.

He was the nephew of Jimmy Dunne.
