= Eric Barber (Irish footballer) =

Irish footballer

Personal information
- Date of birth: 18 January 1942
- Place of birth: Dublin, Ireland
- Date of death: 20 August 2014 (aged 72)
- Position: Striker

Senior career*
Years	Team	Apps	(Gls)
1958–1966	Shelbourne	139	(89)
1966–1967	Birmingham City	4	(1)
1967	Chicago Spurs	12	(8)
1968–1969	Kansas City Spurs	34	(20)
1969–1970	Shamrock Rovers	25	(15)
1970–1971	Wiener Sport-Club	19	(8)
1971–1975	Shelbourne	81	(37)
1979–1980	Shelbourne	2	(0)

International career
1965	Republic of Ireland	1	(0)

Managerial career
- 1979–1980: Shelbourne
- * Club domestic league appearances and goals

Eric Barber (18 January 1942 – 20 August 2014) was an Irish professional footballer. He spent most of his career playing for Shelbourne in the League of Ireland with whom he had three spells from 1958 to 1966, 1971–75 and 1978–80, managing them during the 1979–80 season.

== Player ==
=== Professional ===
During his time with Shels, Barber scored a club record 126 league goals. He was part of Shels FAI Youth Cup-winning side in 1959 and went on to win the League of Ireland championship in 1962, and the FAI Cup in 1960 and 1963, beating Cork Hibernians 2–0 on both occasions. Barber scored in every round including the final in the 1960 cup win and in the 1962 cup final defeat to Shamrock Rovers. His goal in the 1960 final was a lob from almost forty yards.

In March 1966, Barber signed for Birmingham City, but never became a regular. At the end of the 1966–67 season he was offered a chance to sign for Chicago Spurs in the National Professional Soccer League. After just two days in America, Barber scored twice on his debut at Oakland Clippers, and went on to finish third top scorer in the NPSL. At the end of the season the franchise moved and became Kansas City Spurs and Barber moved with them and finished second top scorer in the league that season.

Barber then moved on loan to Shamrock Rovers for the 1969–70 season as the Kansas City Spurs ran into financial difficulty and scored two goals in 2–1 win against Schalke 04 in the Cup Winners' Cup. He made two appearances in Europe and went on to be the club's top goalscorer that season.

Then Barber got the offer of moving to Vienna to play for Wiener Sport-Club, but despite an impressive start with nearly a goal a game in his first eleven games, an injury and subsequent row about the treatment for it saw him eventually return to Dublin as Shels paid an IR£3,000 transfer fee for him in November 1971.

He played for Shels in their FAI Cup Final defeats in 1973 and 1975, being red-carded in the replay of the 1973 decider in Flower Lodge.

Barber was Shels top league scorer at the end of ten different seasons.

At the end of the 2012 League of Ireland season Barber is twelfth in the all-time League of Ireland goalscoring list with 141 league goals

=== National team ===
Barber was capped once by the Republic of Ireland national football team during his time with Shels in a 1966 FIFA World Cup qualification – UEFA Group 9 qualifier in Spain.

== Manager ==
He was Rovers' assistant manager in the 1978–79 season. He managed Shels the following season.

== Honours ==
- League of Ireland: 1
  - Shelbourne – 1961/62
- FAI Cup: 2
  - Shelbourne – 1960, 1963

== Sources ==
- Paul Doolan; Robert Goggins (1993). The Hoops. Gill & MacMillan. ISBN 0-7171-2121-6.
