= Donal Leahy =

Irish footballer

Personal information
- Full name: Donal Leahy
- Date of birth: 31 August 1938
- Place of birth: Cork, Ireland
- Date of death: 31 December 2015 (aged 77)
- Position: Forward

Youth career
- Dunbar Celtic
- North End

Senior career*
Years	Team	Apps	(Gls)
1956–1969	Evergreen United / Cork Celtic	257	(158)
1969	Tramore Athletic	1	(0)
1969–1970	Limerick	15	(4)

International career
1957–1962	League of Ireland XI	17	(7)
- * Club domestic league appearances and goals

Donal Leahy (31 August 1938 – 31 December 2015) was an Irish footballer recognised for his role as a wing-half. He is chiefly remembered for his time with his hometown club, Evergreen United.

== Club career ==
Leahy made his debut on 15 September 1956, scoring in a match against Shamrock Rovers at Glenmalure Park, which ended in a 3–1 loss for Evergreen in the League of Ireland Shield.

Leahy gained attention from Evergreen after a notable performance for Munster Youths against West Germany Youths at The Mardyke in May 1956. He opted to stay in Cork rather than move to Aston Villa or Blackburn in 1957. Under manager Tommy Moroney, Leahy was repositioned as a striker, a move that resulted in him being the top scorer in the League of Ireland for three consecutive seasons from 1956–57 to 1958–59. On 3 May 1959, Leahy scored the only goal in Evergreen's 1–0 victory over Shamrock Rovers in the Top Four Cup final at Dalymount Park, marking his first senior medal.

On 21 January 1962, Leahy scored five goals in Cork Celtic's 8–2 victory over St. Patrick's Athletic at Richmond Park. He scored the equaliser in the 1964 FAI Cup final against Shamrock Rovers, although Celtic lost the replay. After this season, back problems affected his performance, leading him to play in midfield during the 1964–65 League of Ireland season. Despite this, he became the first Cork player to score in European competition at PFC Slavia Sofia in the 1964–65 European Cup Winners' Cup.

In February 1967, Leahy requested a transfer, seeking a change of club. He played as a fullback during the 1967–68 League of Ireland season, the only season in his 14-year career in which he did not score in the league. He later managed Celtic's reserve team and contributed to the team reaching the 1969 FAI Cup final.

Leahy retired from Cork Celtic in December 1969 and subsequently played non-league football with Tramore Athletic before returning to the League of Ireland with Limerick. He scored on his debut for Limerick at the Markets Field. Leahy retired from professional football due to back issues at the end of the 1969–70 League of Ireland season. He briefly returned to football to score the winning goal in Billy Lord's testimonial match in May 1976.

== International career ==
Leahy scored on his Inter-League debut against the Irish League XI in March 1957. His performance in his debut season led to him being placed on standby for the 1958 FIFA World Cup qualification match against England on 19 May 1957. However, he did not earn this international cap.

He also scored the sole goal for the League of Ireland XI in a defeat to the Scottish League on 5 October 1960 at Celtic Park.

== Legacy ==
In March 1995, he was inducted into the National League Legends roll of honour. He was present when Pat Morley broke his record of 162 League of Ireland goals in November 1999. By the end of the 2013 League of Ireland season, Leahy was joint fifth on the all-time League of Ireland goalscoring list with 162 goals.

== Statistics ==
=== Inter League goals ===
Date	Opponents	Result	Score	Competition	Venue	Attendance
1957-03-18	Irish League XI	D	2–2	friendly	Dalymount Park, Dublin	28,000
1957-04-22	Irish League XI	W	2–1	friendly	Windsor Park, Belfast	15,000
1959-09-02	Scottish Football League XI	L	1–4	friendly	Dalymount Park, Dublin	26,000
1960-04-12	Irish League XI	W	2–1	friendly	Tolka Park, Dublin	8,000
1960-10-05	Scottish Football League XI	L	1–5	friendly	Celtic Park, Glasgow	23,000
1961-03-17	Irish League XI	L	2–3	friendly	Dalymount Park, Dublin	12,000
1961-04-03	Irish League XI	D	1–1	friendly	Solitude Ground, Belfast	22,000

== List of League goals ==
Season	Goals	Club	Notes
1956–57	15	Evergreen	Joint top league goalscorer
1957–58	16	Evergreen	Top league goalscorer
1958–59	22	Evergreen	Top league goalscorer
1959–60	20	Cork Celtic	
1960–61	21	Cork Celtic	
1961–62	18	Cork Celtic	
1962–63	7	Cork Celtic	
1963–64	16	Cork Celtic	
1964–65	5	Cork Celtic	
1965–66	8	Cork Celtic	
1966–67	5	Cork Celtic	
1967–68	0	Cork Celtic	
1968–69	5	Cork Celtic	
1969–70	4	Limerick	

== Honours ==
Cork Celtic

- League of Ireland Shield: 1960–61
- Dublin City Cup: 1961–62
- Top Four Cup: 1956–57, 1958–59, 1959–60
- Munster Senior Cup: 1959–60, 1961–62, 1963–64

== Sources ==
- The Book of Irish Goalscorers by Seán Ryan & Stephen Burke 1987
