= Cork Celtic F.C. =

Irish football club

- Full name: Cork Celtic Football Club
- Dissolved: 1980
- Ground: Turners Cross; Cork
- League: League of Ireland
Home colours

Cork Celtic F.C., originally Evergreen United F.C., was an Irish football club based in Cork. They played in the League of Ireland between 1951 and 1979 and played their home games at Turners Cross. In 1974, they were League of Ireland champions and the following season they reached the second round of the European Cup.

== History ==
=== Evergreen United ===
The club's foundation date is unknown, but its earliest appearance in the FAI Cup was in 1936–37. Evergreen finished as League runners-up in 1954 and 1959. In 1953 they also played in an all-Cork FAI Cup final against Cork Athletic, losing 2–1 in a replay after drawing the first game 2-2. During the 1956–57 season Evergreen's Donal Leahy finished as joint top goalscorer in the league with 15 goals. In the following two seasons Leahy finished top goalscorer outright with 16 and 22 goals respectively. Irish international Tommy Moroney finished his playing career with Evergreen and, on 4 October 1953 in a World Cup qualifier against France, he won the last of his 12 caps while with the club. In 1959 the club changed its name to Cork Celtic.

=== Cork Celtic ===
As Celtic in the 1960s they enjoyed a local rivalry with Cork Hibernians. Attendances reaches record highs in the late 1960s, with players such as Carl Davenport, the Dav, drawing crowds of up to 18,000. In 1974 with a team that included Alfie Hale and Bobby Tambling, Celtic won their only League of Ireland title under manager and former player Paul O'Donovan. Tambling, a former Chelsea player and England international had initially moved to Ireland to work as a Jehovah's Witness missionary. He scored 7 league goals in his first season as he helped Celtic win the title.

=== Best, Hurst and Seeler ===
In subsequent seasons Celtic attracted several other notable players. On the back of League success in 1974, Paul O'Donovan signed George Best and then Geoff Hurst. In December 1975, George Best had a brief spell with Celtic in between equally brief spells at Stockport County and Los Angeles Aztecs. He played only three league games, against Drogheda United, Bohemians and Shelbourne, but despite attracting big crowds he failed to score or impress. In 1976 Geoff Hurst spent a month with Celtic, scoring three goals during his brief stay. Uwe Seeler also played one game for Celtic during the 1977–78 season and scored twice in a 6–2 defeat to Shamrock Rovers.

=== Demise ===
At the start of the 1977–78 season Celtic looked for a longer lease on Turners Cross in order to develop it for the purpose of raising additional income. The club, now in decline since winning the League in 1973–74, saw developing Turners Cross as their only means of survival. The FAI's legal advisers had previously been unable to find the property owner or their original lease, however a complex ownership structure was eventually unravelled. Unable to resolve the tenancy situation with the FAI, Celtic spent no money on the upkeep of Turners Cross and it was eventually deemed unfit for use by the League for the 1978–79 season. As a result, the club moved to Flower Lodge for what would be their final season. But three years of deteriorating relationships with both the League and the F.A.I. led to Celtic being expelled from the League in the summer of 1979.

Despite exiting the League, Cork Celtic's holding company still held the sub-lease on Turners Cross, and the club proposed joining the Munster Senior League. However the Munster F.A. refused, and the trustees of the club eventually relinquished the lease on Turners Cross in 1980, bringing the club to an end.

== Honours ==
- League of Ireland: 1
  - 1973–74
- League of Ireland Shield: 1
  - 1960–61
- Dublin City Cup: 1
  - 1961–62
- Top Four Cup: 4
  - 1956–57, 1958–59, 1959–60, 1973–74
- Munster Senior League: 2
  - 1936–37, 1955–56
- Munster Senior Cup: 6
  - 1951–52, 1959–60, 1961–62, 1963–64, 1971–72, 1973–74
- FAI Junior Cup
  - Winners: 1935–36: 1
  - Runners Up: 1934–35: 1
- FAI Youth Cup
  - Winners: 1938–39, 1948–49: 2
  - Runners Up: 1961–62, 1976–77: 2

== Season placings ==
Chart of yearly table positions for Cork Celtic in League of Ireland

Season	Position
1978–79	16th
1977–78	14th
1976–77	9th
1975–76	8th
1974–75	7th
1973–74	1st
1972–73	12th
1971–72	8th
1970–71	5th
1969–70	9th
1968–69	11th
1967–68	3rd
1966–67	11th
1965–66	11th
1964–65	8th
1963–64	4th
1962–63	4th
1961–62	2nd
1960–61	4th
1959–60	2nd
1958–59	2nd
1957–58	3rd
1956–57	4th
1955–56	4th
1954–55	11th
1953–54	2nd
1952–53	10th
1951–52	5th

== European record ==
=== Overview ===
Competition	Matches	W	D	L	GF	GA
European Cup	2	0	0	2	2	7
European Cup Winners' Cup	2	0	1	1	1	3
TOTAL	4	0	1	3	3	10

=== Matches ===
Season	Competition	Round	Opponent	Home	Away	Aggregate
1964–65	European Cup Winners' Cup	1R	(Bulgaria) Slavia Sofia	0–2	1–1	1–3
1974–75	European Cup	1R	(Cyprus) Omonia	w/o		
1974–75	European Cup	2R	(Soviet Union) Ararat Yerevan	1–2	0–5	2–7

== Notable former players ==
- (Republic of Ireland) Florrie Burke
- (Republic of Ireland) Tommy Moroney
- (Republic of Ireland) Donal Leahy
- (Republic of Ireland) Jim "Jimux" O'Keeffe GK
- (Republic of Ireland) Paul O'Donovan
- (Republic of Ireland) Kevin Blount
- (Republic of Ireland) Dinny Allen
- (Republic of Ireland) Jimmy Barry-Murphy
- (Republic of Ireland) Amby Fogarty
- (Republic of Ireland) Alfie Hale
- (Republic of Ireland) Patsy Dorgan
- (Republic of Ireland) Keelan Hegarty
- (Republic of Ireland) Jimmy O'Neill
- (England) Geoff Hurst
- (England) Bobby Tambling
- (Northern Ireland) George Best
- (Northern Ireland) Billy McCullough
- (West Germany) Uwe Seeler
- (England) Barry Notley
- (England) Alec Ludzic

== Notable former managers ==
- (Republic of Ireland) Paul O'Donovan
- (England) Bobby Tambling
- (Republic of Ireland) Alfie Hale

== See also ==
- League of Ireland in Cork city
- 1962 League of Ireland Championship play-off
