= Ian Baraclough =

English footballer and manager

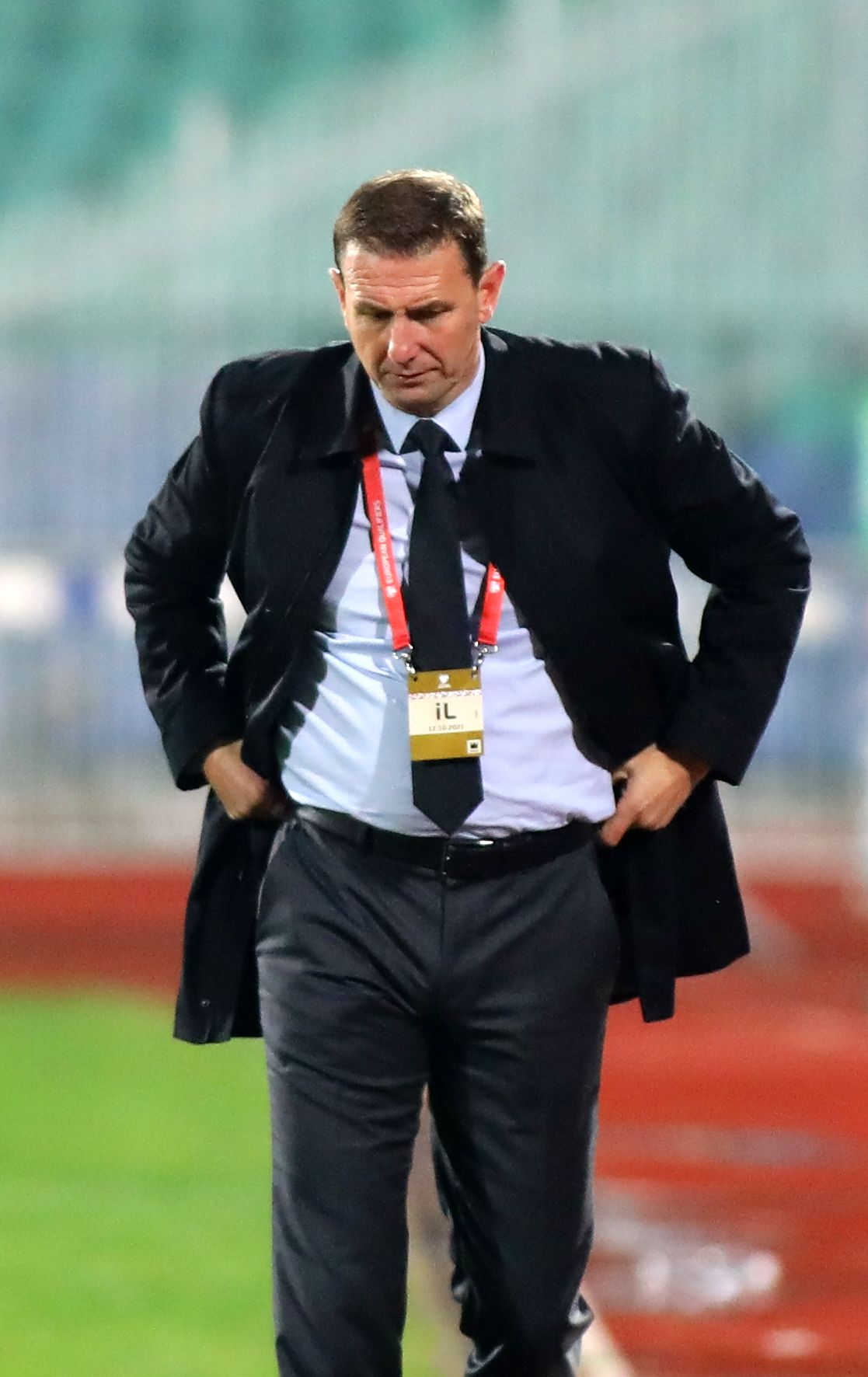
- Baraclough as the manager of Northern Ireland in 2021

Personal information
- Full name: Ian Robert Baraclough
- Date of birth: 4 December 1970 (age 55)
- Place of birth: Leicester, England
- Positions: Defender; midfielder

Team information
- Current team: Partick Thistle (Sporting Director)

Youth career
- Leicester City

Senior career*
Years	Team	Apps	(Gls)
1988–1991	Leicester City	0	(0)
1990	→ Wigan Athletic (loan)	9	(2)
1990	→ Grimsby Town (loan)	4	(0)
1991–1992	Grimsby Town	1	(0)
1992–1994	Lincoln City	73	(10)
1994–1995	Mansfield Town	47	(5)
1995–1998	Notts County	111	(10)
1998–2001	Queens Park Rangers	125	(1)
2001–2004	Notts County	101	(7)
2004–2008	Scunthorpe United	134	(15)
Total		605	(50)

Managerial career
- 2010–2011: Scunthorpe United
- 2012–2014: Sligo Rovers
- 2014–2015: Motherwell
- 2017–2020: Northern Ireland U21
- 2020–2022: Northern Ireland
- * Club domestic league appearances and goals

Ian Robert Baraclough (born 4 December 1970) is an English football manager and former player who is sporting director of Scottish Championship club Partick Thistle.

As a player, he was a defender from 1988 to 2008 for Leicester City, Grimsby Town, Lincoln City, Mansfield Town, Notts County, Queens Park Rangers and Scunthorpe United.

Having been a part of Scunthorpe's coaching staff after retiring from playing he went on to manage the club between 2010 and 2011. In 2012, he was appointed manager of Sligo Rovers and is regarded as the club's most successful manager having led the club to numerous trophies during a two-year stay. His most recent managerial role had been a short spell as assistant manager of Cheltenham Town, having been the manager of the Northern Ireland national team prior to that.

== Playing career ==
Born in Leicester, Baraclough started his career with local team Leicester City, and has also played for Grimsby Town, Lincoln City, Mansfield Town, Notts County and Queens Park Rangers (QPR).

Baraclough signed for QPR in March 1998 making his debut against Stoke City the same month. He played 125 league games for them, scoring one goal against Huddersfield Town.

After his spell at Loftus Road, Baraclough joined Notts County and enjoyed a turbulent first season captaining the side on a few occasions.

He later signed for Scunthorpe United in 2004 on a free transfer, enjoying fantastic success with the Iron, winning promotion from Football League Two. He was part of the team who were then promoted from League One as champions to the Championship in 2007 and then once more via the playoffs in 2009 as part of the backroom staff at Glanford Park where he had great success as coach/assistant to Nigel Adkins. Baraclough made 124 League starts and nine as a substitute, scoring seven goals for Scunthorpe.

== Coaching career ==
=== Scunthorpe United ===
When Nigel Adkins was appointed Scunthorpe manager in November 2006, Baraclough was made head first-team coach. From the 2008–09 season, he ceased playing to concentrate on coaching duties.

Baraclough was appointed caretaker manager of the club on 12 September 2010, following Adkins' departure to League One Southampton. His first match was a 4–0 away win at Sheffield United. On 24 September 2010, Scunthorpe United named him as their new manager. He was surprisingly dismissed on 16 March 2011 after a 3–0 loss to Preston North End, who occupied 24th place in the Championship, with his team having just dropped into the relegation zone at the time of his dismissal.

=== Sligo Rovers ===
On 27 February 2012, Baraclough was announced as the new manager of League of Ireland Premier Division side Sligo Rovers. He fought off competition from former Aston Villa boss Brian Little, former Sligo legend Willie McStay, and Republic of Ireland international Kevin Kilbane.

On 13 October 2012, Baraclough led Sligo Rovers to their first League of Ireland title in 35 years. The 3–2 victory against St Patrick's Athletic secured the league title with two games to play and was played in front of a sell-out crowd of 5,600 at The Showgrounds. As a result of this title, Sligo Rovers qualified for the 2013–14 UEFA Champions League, and Baraclough was the sole English coach involved in that season's competition.

Baraclough then led Sligo Rovers to their fifth (and his first) FAI Cup triumph in an exciting 3–2 win over Drogheda United in the 2013 FAI Cup final at the Aviva Stadium on 3 November.

Baraclough and Sligo Rovers continued their winning habit by lifting the first major piece of silverware available during the 2014 season by defeating high flying Dundalk in the All-Ireland Setanta Sports Cup at a rain soaked Tallaght Stadium. The 1–0 victory gave Sligo Rovers their first ever cross border title since they were formed in 1928.

On 19 June 2014, Baraclough parted company with Sligo Rovers with the club in fifth place, 17 points behind leaders Dundalk.

After leaving Sligo, Baraclough worked as a scout for Huddersfield Town.

=== Motherwell ===
On 13 December 2014, Baraclough was appointed manager of Motherwell of the Scottish Premiership, replacing Stuart McCall. Despite a very tough season he led the club to league safety after 6–1 aggregate victory in the Scottish Premiership play-offs against Rangers in a two-legged final at the end of the season. In an ironic twist of events, the opposition manager was his predecessor at Fir Park, Stuart McCall. Baraclough left Motherwell in September 2015, with the club having taken seven points from their first eight league games of the 2015–16 season.

=== Oldham Athletic ===
In July 2016, Baraclough was appointed assistant manager at League One club Oldham Athletic by incoming manager Steve Robinson, who he worked with at Baraclough's previous club Motherwell.

=== Northern Ireland Under-21 ===
In May 2017 Baraclough left Oldham to become manager of the Northern Ireland Under-21 side.

=== Northern Ireland ===
After a successful spell with the under-21s, he was appointed as the successor to Michael O'Neill as manager of the senior team on 27 June 2020. Baraclough's first match in charge of Northern Ireland was an away UEFA Nations League fixture against Romania which ended in a 1–1 draw. On 12 November 2020, Northern Ireland lost 2–1 to Slovakia in the UEFA Euro 2020 qualifying play-offs and failed to qualify for the finals in 2021. He was sacked on 21 October 2022. In May 2023, he was linked with the St Patrick's Athletic job following the departure of Tim Clancy from the role.

=== Cheltenham Town ===
On 18 January 2024, Baraclough was appointed assistant manager of League One club Cheltenham Town on an initial contract until the end of the season.

=== AFC Fylde ===
On 18 December 2024, Baraclough announced that he had started his new role as Director of Football at AFC Fylde of the National League, having joined the club at the end of the previous month.

=== Partick Thistle ===
In April 2025 Scottish Championship club Partick Thistle announced the appointment of Baraclough as the club's first ever sporting director.

== Personal life ==
In June 2025, Baraclough was left requiring "immediate surgery" following potentially life-changing back and neck injuries he sustained whilst swimming on holiday in Mauritius.

== Managerial statistics ==
As of match played 27 September 2022

Managerial record by team and tenure
Team	From	To	Record				
Team	From	To	P	W	D	L	Win %
Scunthorpe United	12 September 2010	16 March 2011	34	8	4	22	23.5
Sligo Rovers	27 February 2012	19 June 2014	111	61	25	25	55.0
Motherwell	13 December 2014	23 September 2015	34	12	5	17	35.3
Northern Ireland U21	5 May 2017	27 June 2020	17	8	5	4	47.1
Northern Ireland	27 June 2020	21 October 2022	28	6	8	14	21.4
Total			224	95	47	82	42.4

== Honours ==
=== Player ===
Grimsby Town

- Lincolnshire Senior Cup: 1991–92

Notts County

- Football League Third Division: 1997–98

Scunthorpe United

- Football League One: 2006–07
- Football League Two promotion: 2004–05

=== Managerial ===
Sligo Rovers

- League of Ireland Premier Division: 2012
- FAI Cup: 2013
- Setanta Sports Cup: 2014
