= Bartley Gorman =

English bareknuckle boxer (1944–2002)

Bartley Gorman V (1 March 1944 – 18 January 2002) was a bare-knuckle boxer.

Born in England, his family were Travellers of Irish descent, his mother was born in Newry, County Down, Northern Ireland. Gorman called himself "the King of the Gypsies". Between 1972 and 1992, he reigned supreme in the world of illegal gypsy boxing. During these years, he fought down a mineshaft, in a quarry, at horse fairs, on campsites, in bars and clubs, and in the streets. Several of Gorman's relatives have become professional boxers, including Nathan Gorman, Hughie Fury and Tyson Fury.

== Early life ==
Gorman was born on 1 March 1944, in Giltbrook, Nottinghamshire, England, to Irish born parents, who were both from Irish Traveller bloodline. His paternal grandfather and great-grandfather were bare-knuckle fighters. Gorman had his first bare-knuckle fight at the age of 12 years old.

== Career ==
Gorman claimed that he won the title of Bareknuckle Champion of Great Britain and Ireland sometime around 1972/73, having beaten rival Jack Fletcher in a fight at a quarry. He was 28, 6 feet 1 inch (1.85 metres) tall and weighed 15 stone 7 pounds (98 kilograms). Quite who this "title" was supposedly awarded by is of course unclear, as is any information as to why beating the aforementioned Jack Fletcher would merit it, as he appears to be unknown to history apart from this mention by Gorman.

On St Leger day in 1976, Gorman claims he was ambushed by an armed mob and almost killed. He says he had turned up expecting to fight a challenger by the name of Ricky "Top Hat" Donahue, but was set upon by the group, who he claims had been paid £25,000 to carry out the attack. Bartley claimed in his book: "I showed up at 10.30am, the agreed time, but he (Donahue) was nowhere to be seen. Then from out of nowhere 25 guys appeared with crowbars and bricks. I was beaten senseless."

Bartley Gorman and David Pearce signed to fight for the World unlicensed title after Pearce KO'd former WBA World Heavyweight Champion John Tate in California. Gorman said; "Dave Pearce is the best gorger fighting man in Great Britain and I am King of the Gypsies, If I win I will challenge Muhammad Ali to fight for the title". This was made possible due to the links both fighters had with former Bareknuckle fighter and friend to Ali, Paddy Monaghan. The BBBoC threatened a worldwide ban on Pearce if he took part. Pearce was forced to decline and, according to Gorman, was "left devastated".

== Retirement and death ==
Gorman claimed to remain unbeaten until his retirement in 1992, with his last fight a draw with Graeme O'Laughlan (Kennedy).

In January 2002, hundreds of gypsies from across the country came to his funeral after he died aged 57

== In popular culture ==
In the 2012 film The Dark Knight Rises, actor Tom Hardy used Gorman's voice as one of the inspirations for the accent of Bane. Gorman has been cited as the main inspiration for professional wrestler Wade Barrett's finishing move, the Bull Hammer Elbow.

Gorman's autobiography King of the Gypsies, written with the help of Peter Walsh, was completed just before Gorman's death. Shane Meadows filmed a documentary entitled King of the Gypsies, interviewing Gorman about his life in 1995. The 1999 comedy drama A Room for Romeo Brass featuring Paddy Considine who played the part of Morrell based his accent on Gorman's.
