= Sligo Rovers F.C. =

Sligo Rovers
- Full name: Sligo Rovers Football Club
- Nickname: The Bit O'Red
- Short name: Rovers; Sligo
- Founded: 1928; 98 years ago
- Ground: The Showgrounds
- Capacity: 5,500 (3,873 seated)
- Owner: Supporter-owned
- Chairman: Tommy Higgins
- Manager: Darren Purse
- League: League of Ireland First Division
- 2026: League of Ireland Premier Division, 10th of 10 (Relegated)
- Website: www.sligorovers.com
| Home colours | Away colours |

Sligo Rovers Football Club is an Irish professional (relegated) football club playing in the League of Ireland First Division. The club is based in Sligo in the west of Ireland.

The club was founded in 1928 and have been in the League of Ireland since 1934. The club is a co-operative venture, owned by the people of Sligo. Rovers have played at The Showgrounds since their inception. In 2013, they won a third FAI Cup in four years, and also became the 2012 Premier Division Champions, winning the league with two games to spare. In total, they have won three league titles, five FAI Cups and two League Cups.

== History ==
=== Beginnings ===
Sligo Rovers Football Club was formed on 17 September 1928 as a result of an amalgamation of two junior sides, Sligo Town and Sligo Blues. Their first game was a 9–1 victory against Ballyshannon, a team from County Donegal in Ulster, on 23 September 1928 in the qualifying round of the Connacht Cup. The club, elected to the League of Ireland in 1934, hails from Sligo and play their home matches at the Showgrounds and have done so ever since their inception. The home colours are red with white sleeve uppers, with red shorts and socks while the away colours are white with black sides, white shorts and socks. The third alternative kit is navy with red sleeve uppers, navy shorts and navy socks with a red upper part.

=== 1928–1940: Early success ===
The club started well by winning the FAI Junior Cup in their first season, beating Grangegorman in the final at the Showgrounds 3–0. The following season also brought silverware in the shape of the Connacht Junior Cup with Rovers beating Galway in the final 1–0 after a replay. At the beginning of the 1931–32 season the club successfully applied to join the Dublin-based Sunday Alliance League and won their first game at this level by beating Windy Arbour 4–2 at the Showgrounds and went on to win the league, finishing four points ahead of Westland Sligo. After this success the club moved up another level the following season by joining the Leinster Senior League and played their first game away to UCD in August 1932 and won 4–2. The club performed well in their first season at this level eventually finishing third as Brideville won the league. This season also saw The Bit O' Red make their first appearance in the FAI Cup, winning in the first round against Brideville 3–1 before going out to Shelbourne in the next round 5–2. The next year, the club won the Leinster Senior League in only their second year at this level by beating Distillery in a play-off at Tolka Park 3–2 after the teams had finished the league level on points. The team also won the Intermediate Cup, winning 5–1 against Waterford side Tramore Rookies in the final at Dalymount Park, as well as the Metropolitan Cup, beating Queens Park 3–0 in the final at Tolka Park to secure a remarkable treble for the young club.

Chart of yearly table positions for Sligo Rovers in League of Ireland

Following this achievement the club was elected to the Free State League on 28 June 1934 along with Waterford as both Shelbourne and Cork Bohemians resigned from the league. Scotsman Bob Preston, ex-Heart of Midlothian, Plymouth Argyle and Torquay United player, managed the team in their first season at the highest level of Irish football with the first game being a 3–1 defeat in the Shield at the Iveagh Grounds in Dublin against St. James Gate. Tommy Callaghan scored Rovers' goal. The team finished third in that season with Gerry McDaid finishing as top scorer. During this season local Paddy Monaghan won two caps for the Irish national team and is still the only man to have achieved this while at the club.

The 1936–37 season began in spectacular fashion with Sligo winning their first 11 games and they clinched their first league title by beating Cork 4–3 with two games of the season remaining. Trainer and captain that year was Jimmy Surgeoner in his only season at the club. Top scorer was Englishman Harry Litherland whose record of 19 league goals that season was surpassed by Eoin Doyle in 2011 season scoring 20 league goals. The club also won the Dublin City Cup this year beating Dundalk in the final. Two years later, in 1939, the club reached their first FAI Cup final by beating Dundalk 2–1 in the semi-final. A crowd of 30,601 went to Dalymount Park to see Rovers take on Shelbourne in the final which ended in a 1–1 draw. The replay was held at Dalymount Park 10 days later on 3 May with 28,369 in attendance to see the Dublin side record a 1–0 victory thanks to an early goal. The club were also runners-up in the league that year finishing nine points behind winners Shamrock Rovers making it another good season for the club.

The following season once again saw the club come close to winning a trophy on two occasions. First was a 3–2 defeat to Bohs in a play-off for the shield after the two sides finished level on points. Also that year the club reached its second consecutive FAI Cup final with Shamrock Rovers providing the opposition in front of a crowd of 38,500 on 21 April. Unfortunately for Rovers, it was Shams who ran out 3–0 winners. Despite this success the club decided that because of The Emergency the club could no longer compete in the league and withdrew from football.

=== Dixie Dean ===
Before the cup campaign of 1939 the club's committee decided they needed a big name to fill the vacant centre-forward position. They got in touch with some contacts in England, one of whom was the manager of Everton who suggested that Dixie Dean, who was at Notts County at the time, could be available. Although coming to the end of his career Dean was still one of the biggest names in football due to his goalscoring feats during his time at Everton where he is still the club's all-time leading scorer and also holds the record for having scored the highest number of league goals in a single season – 60 in 1927–28. Despite rejecting Rovers' initial offer the club's improved second offer was accepted by Dean and a massive coup was pulled off by the club. A huge crowd turned up at Sligo Railway Station to give Dean a hero's welcome. Dean duly scored on his debut, a game against Shelbourne in the Showgrounds on 29 January and went on to score nine more in his seven league appearances for the club, including five in a single game against Waterford. He also scored in the FAI cup final of that year in the 1–1 draw with Shelbourne though the replay would be lost 1–0. Dean's runners-up medal was stolen after the game but he did however have it returned to him seven years later when he was back in England. Dean returned to Ireland in 1978 to see Sligo Rovers play in the FAI Cup final of that year.

=== 1948–1976: Return to football and trophyless years ===
Following the end of the war Rovers began attempts to return to the league. In 1945 the club couldn't raise sufficient funds to facilitate this and the following year improvement works at the Showgrounds delayed the return by another year. In 1947 Rovers applied to rejoin the league but were unsuccessful as the league decided to maintain its structure of eight teams. A year later and the club were this time successful and were readmitted to the league along with Transport for the 1948–49 season. After two quiet seasons Rovers were once again challenging for honours, this time going close to winning the league title. Going into the final game of the season against Transport, Rovers needed a win to finish level on points with Cork Athletic and force a play-off but they could only draw 0–0 and finished second, a point behind Athletic. The Cork side also denied Rovers in the FAI Cup knocking them out 2–0 at the semi-final stage. At the beginning of the next season the club signed Scottish forward Johnny Armstrong who would go on to stay with the club for several years and become the all-time leading goalscorer.

The next few seasons saw Rovers finish around mid-table. On 6 March 1955 one of the most famous games the Showgrounds has seen took place when Rovers were drawn to face Shamrock Rovers in the FAI Cup. Before the match Rovers announced that they had signed Austrian International Albert Straka to play in the game and this attracted much attention resulting in a crowd of over 7,000. In the final minute with Rovers 2–1 down a penalty was awarded and up stepped Straka to equalise and create jubilant scenes. Rovers would go on to lose the replay. Rovers finished the 1956–57 season in third place however it would be another nine seasons before they would finish inside the top three again. The slump began in the 1957–58 season with the club finishing in the bottom two and therefore having to apply for re-election for the first time. During the next few years Rovers struggled on the pitch as well as off it with persistent financial difficulties blighting the club. This came to a head at the end of the 1961–62 season when the decision was made to cut the league from 12 clubs to 10. With Rovers having finished bottom for the last two seasons they, along with Transport, were dismissed from the league despite the club making an appeal to the FAI.

The absence would only last one year however, when the decision was made to bring the league's numbers back up to 12, Rovers were re-admitted along with Drogheda. The club's fortunes improved after their return and they had three consecutive top half finishes from 1965 to 1967, a feat not matched until 2008 and they also reached an FAI Cup semi-final in 1966 but lost to Limerick after a replay. A significant achievement was made in 1968 when Rovers were able to take full ownership of the Showgrounds, which enabled them to begin work on improving facilities at the venue. One of the worst moments of the club's history occurred in 1969 when the club were beaten by non-league opposition in the FAI Cup for the first time as Longford Town won 2–0 in Longford. Rovers fared better in the cup the following year as they reached their first final in 30 years where they faced Bohs. After the first two games ended scoreless Bohs came out on top in the second replay winning 2–1 despite Johnny Cooke giving Rovers the lead. The following years saw Rovers struggle towards the bottom end of the table, and they had to apply for re-election on two occasions as financial constraints forced the club to adopt a part-time policy. Rovers reached their first League Cup final but lost 4–1 over two legs to Limerick.

=== 1977–1985: Second league title and first FAI Cup ===
The 1976–77 season would be one of the most successful in the club's history as the club won its first league title for 40 years and its second ever. Manager Billy Sinclair assembled a talented squad with a mix of local and British talent that pipped Bohs to the title by a point with the title being clinched with a famous 3–1 victory over Shamrock Rovers at the Showgrounds on Easter Sunday. In the squad that year was goalkeeper Alan Paterson; defenders McManus, Sinclair, Fox (captain), Rutherford, Stenson; midfielders Fagan, Fielding, McGee, Betts, Ferry, Walker and forwards Leonard and Hulmes. The club also reached their second successive League Cup final but lost 1–0 to Shamrock Rovers. Sligo native Paul 'Ski' McGee played a big part in the title win and was transferred to English side QPR at the end of the season and would go on to have a successful time in England as well as earning 16 caps for the Ireland national side. The league win gave Rovers their first opportunity to play in Europe and they were drawn to play Red Star Belgrade of Yugoslavia in the first round of the European Cup. They would lose both legs 3–0.

The next season saw another cup run for Rovers as they reached the final of the FAI Cup again and this time Shamrock Rovers, managed by Irish football legend Johnny Giles, were their opponents. A controversial penalty scored by Ray Treacy gave the Dublin side a 1–0 win and prolonged Rovers search for their first FAI Cup. After one more season manager Billy Sinclair announced his departure and he would eventually be replaced by ex-Finn Harps manager Patsy McGowan who brought with him several players from the Donegal side. This included Brendan Bradley the league's all-time top scorer. In his second season at the club McGowan led Rovers to their fifth FAI Cup final where they this time met Dundalk. A 2–0 defeat left many wondering would Rovers ever get their hands on the famous trophy. At the end of the following season when Rovers finished in 5th position McGowan left to return to Finn Harps. He would be replaced by long-serving player Paul Fielding.

With financial difficulties persisting the club finished towards the bottom of the table however the 1983 season will always be remembered at the club for the FAI Cup run of that year. Rovers made their way to the semi-finals by beating Shamrock Rovers and were drawn to face junior side Cobh Ramblers in what looked to be a straightforward tie. However it took a late equaliser for Rovers to force the first game to a replay and in that Cobh came from two down to force a second replay back at Flower Lodge which saw another draw. Rovers eventually came out on top in the third replay, despite going two down, to book their place in the final. The tie earned Cobh the respect of Rovers and the Irish footballing public. A week later, on 24 April, Rovers were facing Bohs in the cup final at a rain-soaked Dalymount Park. Bohs took the lead in the first half and it was looking like Rovers would lose their sixth cup final. However an equaliser from Tony Stenson brought Rovers back into it and a lob by local winger Harry McLoughlin won it for Rovers. The final result of 2–1 meant that club captain and long-serving local hero Tony Fagan could finally get his hands on the FAI Cup for the club 50 years after the club first entered it. Huge celebrations were had in Sligo following the victory. The following season Rovers were in the Cup Winners' Cup but lost to Finnish side FC Haka 1–0 and 3–0.

=== 1986–1993: Moving between divisions ===
For the 1985–86 season the league expanded to incorporate a First Division as well as the Premier. This meant the bottom four sides would be relegated. By this stage most of the Cup winning side had moved on and manager Paul Fielding had been replaced by Gerry Mitchell, with financial difficulties forcing the club into having a part-time squad. Despite Rovers coming from three down on the final day of the season to draw 3–3 with Drogheda it wasn't enough and Rovers were relegated on goal difference. Rovers bounced back the following year with Gerry Mitchell still in charge and much of the previous season's squad still there they finished runners-up behind Bray Wanderers which was enough to secure their way back to the Premier Division. At the end of this season, an Extraordinary General Meeting was held where the decision was made to structure the club as a co-op, and that structure is still in existence today. Back in the Premier, Rovers managed to stay up and also had a run to the semi-finals of the FAI Cup where they were defeated by Shamrock Rovers. The next season was a poor one with Rovers finishing bottom and never looking capable of survival which meant a return to First Division football for the 1988–89 season. Things were to get even worse the following year with David Pugh replacing Mitchell as manager and an all local policy the club finished bottom of the First Division in what is still their worst ever finish.

Things were to improve dramatically the following year under new manager Dermot Keely, who was able to bring in some experienced players from Dublin. A 1–1 draw with Kilkenny City on the final day was enough to secure promotion back to the top flight. Although beaten by Waterford United in a play-off for the title the club were back in the Premier Division for the 1990–91 season. After finishing in a respectable mid-table position upon their return Rovers were back fighting relegation the following year, although they did survive courtesy of loanee Colin Cameron's hat-trick on the final day of the season in Drogheda. Keely resigned after the first three games of the following season which led to Rovers appointing Willie McStay as manager but he couldn't keep them up and Rovers returned to the First Division for the 1993–94 season.

=== 1994–2000: Treble win and European exploits ===
Despite this 1994 proved to be one of the most successful of the club's history under the popular Scot. The first trophy was won early in the season in the First Division Shield with Waterford United being beaten 2–1 over two legs. Another addition that year was the installation of floodlights at the historic Showgrounds. Rovers began with a 4–0 over Home Farm. With three games to spare, promotion was guaranteed with a 2–0 away win over Athlone Town, with the First Division title secured with a 1–0 home win over Bray Wanderers. The club's best day of the season was set up by Eddie Annand's winning goal in the FAI Cup semi-final over Limerick at the Showgrounds. The final against Premier Division Derry City was fixed for 15 May at Lansdowne Road on what proved to be another wet day. The game was won by Gerry Carr's header and captain Gavin Dykes lifted the trophy. McStay left at the end of the season to return to Celtic and he would be replaced by Wimbledon cup final hero Lawrie Sanchez but only after caretaker Chris Rutherford had guided Rovers to their first European win, beating Maltese side Floriana 3–2 on aggregate in the Cup Winners' cup. Padraig Moran, one of the club's all-time leading goalscorers, scored Rovers' first European goal. The next round pitted Rovers against big name opposition in the shape of Belgian side Club Brugge. Despite Johnny Kenny's goal in the first leg Rovers lost 2–1 at the Showgrounds and then 3–1 in the return leg.

At one stage of the 1994–95 season, Rovers were contending for the title but a bad run at the end of the season, largely due to a backlog of fixtures, meant they eventually finished 8th. Rovers put up a good defence of the cup but Shelbourne's 3–1 win at the Showgrounds ended their hopes. Sanchez would leave the club at the end of the season to return to England but his replacement and former Wimbledon team-mate Steve Cotterill continued the success of recent seasons. He guided them to their first League cup final since 1977. Despite a 1–0 home win in the first leg of the final and going one up in the second opponents Shelbourne fought back and a last minute equaliser forced a penalty shoot-out which Shelbourne were to win. Another run in the cup was also enjoyed but Shelbourne were to prove Rovers nemesis again, beating Rovers at the Showgrounds 1–0. A strong league campaign ended with Rovers finishing in third, their highest position since the league winning year of 1977, and that qualified Rovers for the Intertoto Cup. Rovers did well in Europe again recording draws at home to Nantes and Heerenveen but away defeats of Lillestrøm and Kaunas meant Rovers failed to progress beyond the group stages.

Shortly after, Cotterill departed the club and was replaced by former Burnley manager Jimmy Mullen who, despite guiding Rovers to a mid-table finish, left Rovers at the end of the year. His replacement was player-manager Nicky Reid, a former Man City defender. Rovers gained revenge for their defeat to Shelbourne in the League Cup two years earlier by beating them in the final for Rovers' first win in the competition. The next season was not as successful with Rovers needing a fantastic run at the end of the season to stay up by a single point. With Reid now replaced by Scot Jim McInally the trick could not be repeated the next year and the club lost their Premier division status finishing second from bottom but eight points from safety.

=== 2000–2005: Dark days in the First Division ===
Rovers began life in the First Division under former Northern Ireland manager Tommy Cassidy who had come to the club before relegation but too late to save the club. The club maintained its full-time policy in the First Division in a bid to go straight back up but despite challenging up until the final day of the season they missed out on a play-off spot by two points. This resulted in the departure of Cassidy who was replaced by former Torquay United and Galway United manager Don O'Riordan who due to financial constraints was forced to blood several local youngsters. One of these was Keith Gilroy who was transferred to Middlesbrough. Results were poor however under O'Riordan with the side finishing in 6th place for three successive years without challenging for promotion. During this period the league made the switch to summer soccer, but for Rovers it proved to be one of the darkest periods in its history. With the club again not challenging for promotion in O'Riordan's fourth year he was eventually sacked and replaced towards the end of that year by untried Northern Irishman Sean Connor. He quickly set about building a much stronger squad from all parts of the world and the club found themselves towards the top of the league throughout the 2005 season with promotion being clinched with a scoreless home draw with Athlone Town on 12 November to end the years of misery in the division often referred to as the graveyard.

=== 2006–2011: Return to the Premier Division and cup successes ===
Connor continued to inspire Rovers to success on their return to the Premier Division and they finished fifth that year. The club also enjoyed its first significant cup run in a decade and faced Derry City in a home semi-final which finished all square in front of one of the biggest crowds the Showgrounds had seen for a long time. The replay would prove to be a disaster, however, with Rovers losing 5–0 on 31 October 2006 in the Brandywell. Shortly after Connor stunned the club by announcing his departure to join Bohs before the season had even ended. His departure left a lot of resentment towards him in Sligo which remains to this day. His replacement, Rob McDonald, a former PSV Eindhoven player would only last one game in charge, that being the final game of the 2006 season. He was sacked only a couple of weeks before the new season was to begin which left Rovers in the temporary control of caretakers Leo Tierney and Dessie Cawley as the new season began until a new man could be appointed.

That man was former Coventry City and Wigan Athletic scouser Paul Cook. He immediately got the team playing an attractive brand of passing football and despite all the turmoil steered the side to a respectable 6th place in the 12 team league. The club would build on this the following year by finishing in fourth position and thereby qualifying Rovers for Europe for the first time in 12 years. At the end of that season Rovers sold right-back Seamus Coleman to English Premiership side Everton for £60,000. Coleman made his debut under Sean Connor and the Killybegs man quickly established himself as one of the most exciting players in the league thanks to his quality dribbling skills up the right wing. Coleman has since established himself as a regular in the first-team at Everton. He has gone on to win caps for the Ireland national team and was nominated for the PFA Young Player of the year in 2011. The European campaign proved to be a disappointment, however, with Rovers going out to Albanian side KS Vllaznia Shkodër 3–2 on aggregate in their first game. Despite the club failing to compete as high up the league as the previous year, eventually finishing 6th, the club performed much better in the cup and knocked out Derry City, Cork City and Bohs before then beating Waterford 1–0 in the semi-final at the Showgrounds to book their place in the first FAI Cup final for 15 years courtesy of Matthew Blinkhorn's header. The final was played at Tallaght Stadium against big spending new First Division side Sporting Fingal and despite Eoin Doyle giving Rovers the lead early in the second half, Fingal came back with two late goals.

The following season would see Rovers go on to surpass its recent success. Rovers picked up their first piece of silverware by winning the EA Sports Cup with a 1–0 win over surprise finalists Monaghan United. Matthew Blinkhorn scored the winning goal. The goalscoring feats of Pádraig Amond resulted in his sale to Portuguese side Paços de Ferreira during the season. The club also performed well in the league with a run during the second half of the season enough to leave them in third place, their joint highest since winning it in 1977, only four points from being champions. This also guaranteed a return to European football for the next year. The highlight of the year however would be in the final game of the season, the 2010 FAI Cup Final.

On 14 November 2010, the FAI Cup Final took place in the new Aviva Stadium. Sligo Rovers and Shamrock Rovers drew 0–0 before Sligo won on penalties. The Sligo second choice keeper, Ciarán Kelly, saved four penalties in the shootout. Joseph Ndo won the Man of the Match.

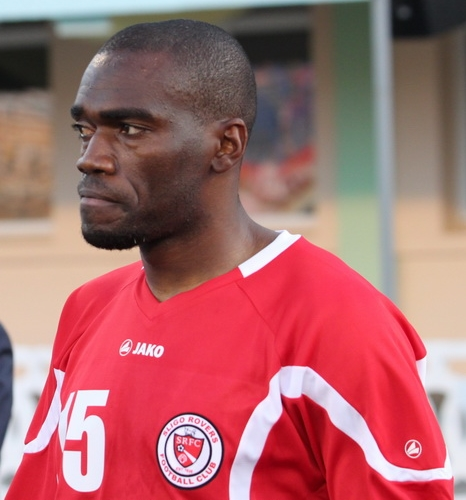
Joseph N'Do during a Europa League game against FC Vorskla Poltava in 2011

The 2011 season was also successful as Paul Cook guided Rovers to second place in the Airtricity League, with a record number of points and record number of goals scored. 15 of these came in two games against Galway United, 8–0 away and 7–1 at home. Despite the club going out of the Europa League to the Ukrainian side Vorskla Poltava, Rovers reached the semi-finals of the EA Sports Cup, and made it to the final of the FAI Ford Cup for a third successive season, this time against Shelbourne. Paul Cook's efforts saw him linked to the vacant position at SPL side St Johnstone, but failed to agree terms with them. After John Coleman was appointed Rochdale manager, Accrington Stanley were granted permission to speak to Cook but talks broke down. However, two days later Sligo Rovers and Accrington agreed compensation for Cook and on 13 February 2012 Cook was appointed manager two weeks before the Airtricity League began.

=== 2012–2013: A third league title and more cup success ===
On 27 February 2012, former Scunthorpe United boss Ian Baraclough was named Rovers new manager, describing the offer as a "fantastic opportunity and I am very thankful for the offer". In his first game as manager, Rovers drew 1–1 with Shelbourne at Tolka Park. Jason McGuinness rescued a point for Baraclough's side in the last minute. In the following game, he won his first game as manager against Glentoran 2–0 in the Setanta Cup thanks to goals from Romauld Boco and Mark Quigley.

Rovers beat reigning champions Shamrock Rovers 3–0 in the Showgrounds on 13 May 2012 to open up an 8-point gap between themselves and 3rd placed Shamrock Rovers and a 6-point gap over second-placed St. Pats. This meant Rovers were unbeaten in the first third of the season along with 2nd placed St. Patrick's Athletic — the first time two sides have achieved this in the same season since the 1980–81 season.

Rovers came unstuck in their Europa League adventure, against Slovaks FC Spartak Trnava losing 3–1 in Slovakia in the first leg, but recovered and obtained a creditable 1–1 draw in the second leg. However Rovers loosened their grip on the FAI Cup losing 3–1 at home to Monaghan United F.C. who later resigned from the league. Another setback occurred during the Spartak Trnava tie when top-scorer Danny North's injury meant he would miss the remainder of the season. However other players particularly Mark Quigley took on the goalscoring responsibilities and Rovers also remained solid defensively. During this period Rovers thrashed rivals Drogheda United 4–1 at the Showgrounds and drew away to the other chasers St. Patrick's Athletic and Shamrock Rovers.

The unbeaten league run meant Rovers could win the title with two games to spare if they beat second placed St. Patrick's Athletic at the Showgrounds. The game became like a cup final with extra seating installed to meet demand and it looked good when Rovers went 2–0 ahead by the middle of the first half. St. Pats needed a win to keep their own aspirations alive and after a half time reshuffle they soon levelled the game at 2–2 with most of the second half remaining. Rovers were still determined to clinch the title that day and pressed on after this eventually winning a late penalty that Mark Quigley converted followed minutes later by the final whistle and celebrations as the ecstatic supporters rushed onto the pitch. Sligo Rovers had won their third league title.

Despite being champions Rovers lost two of their big names, Mark Quigley and Jason McGuinness to Shamrock Rovers before the start of the 2013 season, bringing in Bohemians defender Evan McMillan and re-signing Aaron Greene as replacements. Recruits from the UK were also brought in such as wide midfielder Kieran Djilali and much traveled center-forward Anthony Elding who made a prolific start to his Rovers career as the defending champions won their opening eight games. After that run was ended a spell of games shortly after saw Elding and Rovers struggle to score and slip away from the top of the table. With the Champions League tie looming Baraclough signed striker David McMillan from UCD to try and bolster the attack but he failed to make an impact and struggled to get a game after North's return from injury.

The Bit O'Red's Champions League tie was against strong Norwegian champions Molde FK. Sligo narrowly lost the home leg giving Molde the edge they never let slip. After this Rovers tried to resurrect their title bid but defeats against surprise contenders Dundalk and home draws meant that in almost a mirror image of the previous season St. Patrick's Athletic won the title after beating Sligo with 2 games to spare.

This season however saw Sligo resurrect their FAI cup form and they followed up an away win at Waterford United with 1–0 victories over Cork City and Derry City. The semi final against Shamrock Rovers saw the highlight of the season so far as Sligo Rovers comfortably won 3–0. Rovers would face Drogheda United who had knocked them out of the Setanta Cup and a sluggish first half saw the Louth men go a goal up. With fifteen minutes to go they still trailed but suddenly the whole game came to life as substitute Danny North equalized and a few minutes later gave Sligo the lead with a goal from a clever but controversial free kick routine. The protests over the goal led to a Drogheda player getting sent off but Sligo were also reduced to ten men as Gavin Peers was forced off with injury after all the substitutions had been made. Drogheda took advantage of this to equalize and another Sligo Rovers cup final looked on its way to extra time. However, with injury time running out Danny North turned provider setting up Anthony Elding for a great finish and a third FAI Cup for Sligo Rovers in four seasons.

=== 2014–2019: End of glory days and survival battles ===
The 2014 season started badly when, after a narrow opening day win, Rovers lost four in a row. A pick up in form saw them beat Dundalk in the final Setanta Cup final but the same opposition soon thrashed Rovers 3–0 twice in two weeks including the FAI cup. Further poor league results led to the decision to sack Ian Baraclough. Sligo Rovers quickly found a replacement from North West England in John Coleman and he oversaw Sligo's second European success when they defeated FK Banga of Lithuania 4–0. This was twenty years after their first success and Sligo followed this with a shock 2–1 away first-leg win at Rosenborg. They then took the lead in the second leg but Rosenborg, who had changed managers after the first leg, bounced back to win 3–1. After the European adventure ended, the downward spiral continued with players including Joseph N'Do being let go to reduce the wage bill. Come September, Coleman also left to manage Accrington Stanley leaving Gavin Dykes as caretaker where he only managed four points in their last eight games. However, before the season's end, the club had arranged for Owen Heary of Bohemians to become manager for 2015.

Owen Heary bolstered the squad with promising former Bohs players but they struggled only getting 2 victories in 13 games. Heary was dismissed but only after a period in limbo where the club were hoping he'd just resign. He was replaced initially by Joseph N'Do but after he lost at bottom club Limerick F.C. they hired a former English Premier league manager Micky Adams who kept them safe with a victory in the penultimate game at St. Patrick's Athletic.

With Micky Adams not staying on, the 2016 season saw Rovers hire former Peterborough Utd manager Dave Robertson. His first season veered between surprise wins at Cork City and champions Dundalk to bad defeats against Bray and a FAI cup exit at struggling Wexford Youths, where Rovers had won 5–0 two weeks prior. Still this season was the more encouraging of this period and a top half finish saw them become one of the first League of Ireland clubs invited to take part in the Scottish League Challenge cup. A bad opening day defeat in the 2017 season and resultant poor form led to Robertson's sacking. Three sides would be automatically relegated as the Premier Division was being reduced to ten teams and this hastened the dismissal. Irish League manager Gerard Lyttle was hired but struggled to move the club out of the relegation zone. The turning point came in a televised August success at runaway leaders Cork City with more victories following, though safety was only assured on the final day of the season.

Much of the 2018 season yet again saw Sligo Rovers flirting with relegation assisted by poor home form as any stand out victories came away from home. When safety was assured, with two weekends to spare, the club still decided to dismiss Gerard Lyttle and waited for the season's end to confirm that Liam Buckley would take charge after his departure from St. Patrick's Athletic. Sligo finished the 2019 campaign in seventh place, comfortably above the relegation places. Liam Buckley's appointment in 2019 proved to be somewhat of a turning point within the club, with Rovers reaching the semi-finals of the FAI Cup in 2019, losing to Dundalk at the Showgrounds.

=== 2020–present: European ventures and league stability ===
Liam Buckley's appointment at the club was a huge turning point at Sligo Rovers, avoiding relegation in 2019 and earning his way to a cup semi final V Dundalk (listed above).

The 2020 season proved to be Rovers' best since 2013, finishing in fourth place and ending the season in a European spot, which meant they were to partake in the inaugural UEFA Conference League qualifiers in mid-2021. Buckley's men also put together somewhat of a cup run, beating Derry City 3–1 on penalties in the FAI Cup Quarter-finals at the Showgrounds, fighting their way to a semi-final bout away to Shams (Shamrock Rovers). Rovers lost 2–0 in a COVID-19 restricted Tallaght stadium, ending their cup run.

The good form continued in 2021, with the bit o' red flying high in the first few months of league competition, leading up to their UEFA Europa Conference League game against Icelandic opposition, Fimleikafélag Hafnarfjarðar. Sligo Rovers lost the away leg 1–0 on 8 July, and disappointingly lost the covid-restricted home leg 2-1 a week later, with the only Rovers goal being a Johnny Kenny penalty. The league form dropped massively after Sligo were knocked out of Europe, as they failed to win in 5 straight games, and were also beaten by first division side Cork City FC in the first round of the FAI Cup. They still however finished the domestic season in third place, solidifying a European return in 2022.

Rovers started off 2022 well, with an away win against St Patrick's Athletic, followed by two consecutive 0-0 draws, and two back to back wins, the latter being a win at home to Finn Harps, when Aidan Keena bagged his first professional hattrick. After an 2-2 thriller away to south dublin rivals Shamrock Rovers, the bit o' red's league form dipped, with two consecutive home losses against Shelbourne FC and Bohemians respectively. After a bad string of results, collecting just 8 points out of an available 27, manager Liam Buckley was sacked, and former Rovers midfielder John Russell took the reins. His first game as interim manager proved a success, with Rovers beating second placed side Derry City 2–1 in the Showgrounds, with Seamus Keogh scoring an injury time winner for Rovers. Subsequently, on 2 June 2022, Russell was named the manager of the club on a permanent basis. European football soon followed with Rovers being drawn against Welsh outfit, Bala Town F.C.. Come 7 July, Sligo Rovers won the away leg 2–1, with goals from Aidan Keena and Max Mata respectively. Rovers hosted the Welsh side 7 days later on 14 July 2022 in the Showgrounds, losing 1–0 in 120 minutes, with the game finishing 2–2 on aggregate. The result was to be decided on penalties, with Edward McGinty making the crucial save to give Rovers the win and help them advance to the second round of qualifying.

Sligo Rovers were then drawn to take on SPFL side Motherwell FC in the second qualifying round., with the winner of the tie set to face Norwegian outfit Viking FK. Much to the surprise of the Scottish media, Rovers stunned Motherwell FC in Fir Park, beating the Scottish side 1-0 thanks to an Aidan Keena lob, capitalizing on a Bevis Mugabi defensive error. Young goalkeeper Luke McNicholas shined in his debut, making numerous important saves to deny the Steelmen. Rovers took the fixture back to the Showgrounds, easing past the Scottish minnows in a 2–0 win, which included a Shane Blaney free kick from 35 yards out, and a Max Mata goal late into injury time(The former, Shane Blaney, signing for Motherwell merely house after the games completion, announced in winter 2022. This was the furthest the club had ever gotten in European competition.

The European run was all but over, when on 4 August Sligo Rovers lost 5–1 away to Viking FK in Stavanger, David Cawley's late penalty a consolation goal. The return leg was set to be played in the Showgrounds. The game was not one to be missed, with regards to the game and the atmosphere, as 3,800 people filled a packed out Showgrounds. Rovers came out on top on the day, finishing their European adventure with a 1–0 win at home to Viking FK, a Will Fitzgerald header proving the winning goal. The bit o' red would go on to finish the domestic season in 5th place.#

The 2023 season proved difficult for John Russell's men with the Rovers flirting with the 2 relegation places throughout the year. The loss of Aidan Keena to Cheltenham Town F.C. amongst others proved difficult for the reds. Their FAI Cup run proved no different, being dumped out of the cup by Drogheda United F.C. on 21 July, following a 2–1 loss. Following a tough season, the bit o' red managed to survive relegation, finishing the league in 8th place, 6 points off 9th spot Cork City. On November 6, 2023, it was announced that John Russell had signed a contract extension, and was to lead Sligo Rovers through the 2024 season

2024 was a year of consistent improvement for the Rovers, sustaining a push for a European spot up until the final game weeks. The season opened with a 2–2 draw to Bohemians F.C. in Dalymount Park. While only accumulating 4 away wins throughout the season, it was the bit o' red's home form that proved most valuable. Out of 18 home games, and 54 available points, they managed to win 9, and draw in 4 games, only falling to 5 home losses throughout the year. It was this home form that allowed the Rovers to maintain their battle for a European spot throughout the year. Notable results throughout the year include a 2–0 win against Shamrock Rovers, as well as a 2–0 win against Galway United, on June 28 and July 27 respectively. Once again, their cup run came to an abrupt end however. After beating Cork side Cobh Wanderers in the first round, the bit o' red fell to first division side University College Dublin, in a 2–0 home loss on August 17, 2024. Rovers finished the season just missing out on a European spot, finishing in a comfortable 6th place. Sligo Rovers once again extended John Russell's contract in October 2024, this time for 2 years.

Once again, the 2025 season was a dramatic one in Rovers fortunes. The season was a tale of two halves, ending up in seventh position in the league following an incredible turnaround in form during the second half of the campaign. The first half saw the team struggle, finishing bottom of the table after 18 games. Their strong second-half surge saw them finally climb to a secure mid-table position, confirming their safety with a 2–1 victory away to league champions Shamrock Rovers on the final day of the season. In the FAI Cup, they fared slightly better, beating Dundalk F.C. 2–0 away in July, and Bohemians F.C. 1–0 away in August. The quarter-finals against First Division side Kerry FC was a dramatic 120 minutes. Rovers took a 3–1 lead with a hat-trick from Owen Elding, but Kerry staged a remarkable comeback, scoring two further goals in the final half-hour to force the game to extra time. Kerry eventually won 4–3. Elding was a key performer throughout the season. His goals were crucial, and he found the net in both the league and cup competitions. John Mahon was the team captain for 2025, but spent much of the second half of the season on the bench following injury.

On 9 October 2026, Sligo were relegated after a 1-5 defeat to Shelbourne at Tolka Park ending a 21 year stay in the top flight.

== Supporters ==
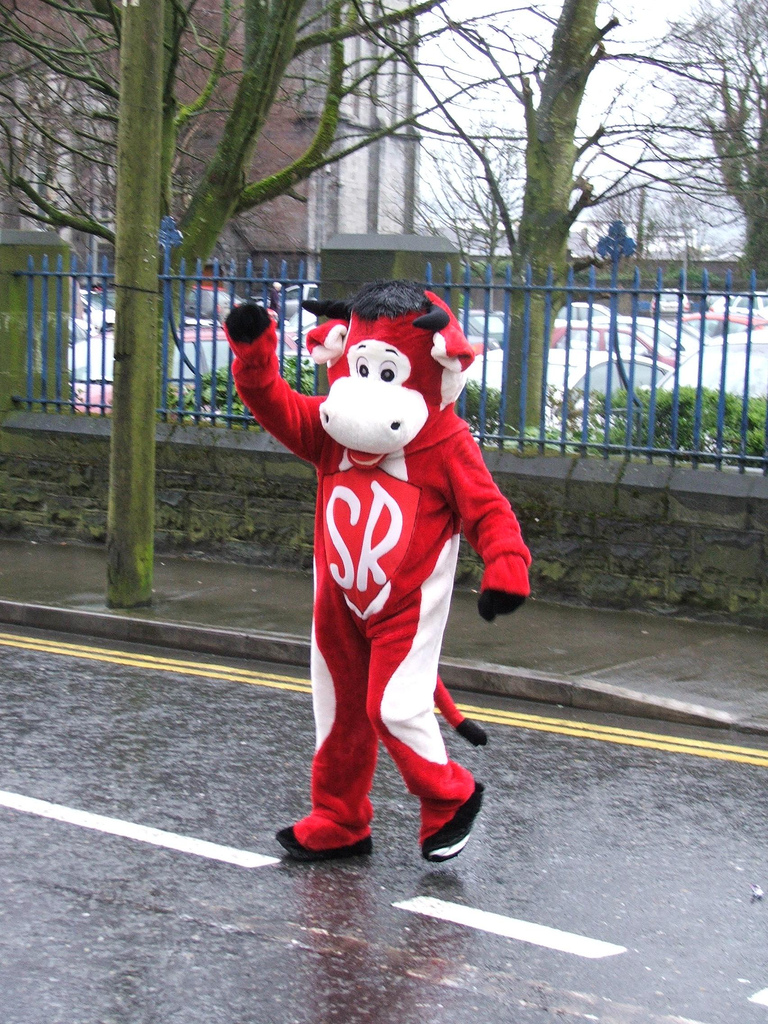
Benny the Bull, the Sligo Rovers team mascot

Since its foundation, the club has had a small but loyal following in Sligo town, where it has been an outpost for football since its inception into the League of Ireland. Sligo Rovers currently averages gates of around 2,000. The average attendance for 2012 season was 3,007. Sligo Rovers has a number of supporters clubs which work on raising funds for the club, particularly the Bit O'Red Supporters Trust which has recently tried to launch some innovative fundraisers to help the club in the long term.

The Dublin Supporters Club (DSC) is another supporters club, as are the South Sligo Supporters Club and the North Sligo Supporters Club, both of which take part in fundraising work within their catchment areas and regularly organise buses to Rovers games both home and away.

The most noticeable supporters group at Sligo Rovers on match days, due to their visual and vocal support for Sligo Rovers, is the independently formed supporters group Forza Rovers (FR08). They have received plaudits from players and supporters for the colourful displays its members have produced since the group was formed in 2008. The group's main goal is to support the club with vocal and visual support on match days. Some of the choreographed displays by the group have involved all stands in the Showgrounds and have been described as "extraordinary" and made the Showgrounds "feel like a 50,000 capacity as the teams walked out to massive noise". Sligo Rovers is the subject of a memoir, There's Only One Red Army by journalist and novelist Eamonn Sweeney, which was published in 1997.

== Honours ==
- League of Ireland/Premier Division: 3
  - 1936–37, 1976–77, 2012
- FAI Cup: 5
  - 1982–83, 1993–94, 2010, 2011, 2013
- League of Ireland Cup: 2
  - 1997–98, 2010
- Dublin City Cup: 1
  - 1936–37
- Setanta Sports Cup: 1
  - 2014
- League of Ireland First Division: 2
  - 1993–94, 2005
- League of Ireland First Division Shield: 1
  - 1993–94
- Leinster Senior League: 1
  - 1933–34
- FAI Intermediate Cup: 1
  - 1933–34
- FAI Junior Cup: 1
  - 1928–29
- Connacht Senior League
  - Winners: 1981–82, 1991–92, 1993–94: 3
  - Runners Up: 1982–83, 1990–91, 1992–93: 3
- Connacht Senior Cup
  - Winners: 1981–82: 1
- Connacht Senior League Challenge Cup
  - Winners: 1990–91, 1993–94: 2
- Connacht Junior Cup
  - Winners: 1929–30: 1

== European record ==
=== Overall ===
| Competition | Matches | W | D | L | GF | GA |
|---|---|---|---|---|---|---|
| European Cup / Champions League | 4 | 0 | 0 | 4 | 0 | 9 |
| UEFA Europa League | 10 | 2 | 4 | 4 | 11 | 13 |
| UEFA Europa Conference League | 8 | 4 | 0 | 4 | 8 | 10 |
| European Cup Winners' Cup | 6 | 1 | 1 | 4 | 5 | 11 |
| UEFA Intertoto Cup | 4 | 0 | 2 | 2 | 3 | 8 |
| TOTAL | 32 | 7 | 7 | 20 | 27 | 51 |

=== Matches ===
| Season | Competition | Round | Opponent | Home | Away | Aggregate |
|---|---|---|---|---|---|---|
| 1977–78 | European Cup | 1R | (Socialist Federal Republic of Yugoslavia) Red Star | 0–3 | 0–3 | 0–6 |
| 1983–84 | UEFA Cup Winners' Cup | 1R | (Finland) Haka | 0–1 | 0–3 | 0–4 |
| 1994–95 | UEFA Cup Winners' Cup | QR | (Malta) Floriana | 1–0 | 2–2 | 3–2 |
| 1994–95 | UEFA Cup Winners' Cup | 1R | (Belgium) Club Brugge | 1–2 | 1–3 | 2–5 |
| 1996 | UEFA Intertoto Cup | Group 5 | (Netherlands) Heerenveen | 0–0 | —N/a | 5th |
| 1996 | UEFA Intertoto Cup | Group 5 | (Norway) Lillestrøm | —N/a | 0–4 | 5th |
| 1996 | UEFA Intertoto Cup | Group 5 | (France) Nantes | 3–3 | —N/a | 5th |
| 1996 | UEFA Intertoto Cup | Group 5 | (Lithuania) Kaunas | —N/a | 0–1 | 5th |
| 2009–10 | UEFA Europa League | 1Q | (Albania) Vllaznia | 1–2 | 1–1 | 2–3 |
| 2011–12 | UEFA Europa League | 3Q | (Ukraine) Vorskla Poltava | 0–2 | 0–0 | 0–2 |
| 2012–13 | UEFA Europa League | 2Q | (Slovakia) Spartak Trnava | 1–1 | 1–3 | 2–4 |
| 2013–14 | UEFA Champions League | 2Q | (Norway) Molde | 0–1 | 0–2 | 0–3 |
| 2014–15 | UEFA Europa League | 1Q | (Lithuania) Banga Gargždai | 4–0 | 0–0 | 4–0 |
| 2014–15 | UEFA Europa League | 2Q | (Norway) Rosenborg | 1–3 | 2–1 | 3–4 |
| 2021–22 | UEFA Europa Conference League | 1Q | (Iceland) FH | 1–2 | 0–1 | 1–3 |
| 2022–23 | UEFA Europa Conference League | 1Q | (Wales) Bala Town | 0–1 (a.e.t.) | 2–1 | 2–2 (4–3 p) |
| 2022–23 | UEFA Europa Conference League | 2Q | (Scotland) Motherwell | 2–0 | 1–0 | 3–0 |
| 2022–23 | UEFA Europa Conference League | 3Q | (Norway) Viking | 1–0 | 1–5 | 2–5 |

Notes

- 1R: First round
- QR: Qualifying round
- 1Q: First qualifying round
- 2Q: Second qualifying round
- 3Q: Third qualifying round

== Records and statistics ==
=== Most overall appearances ===
| Ranking | Nationality | Name | Years | Total Appearances (league only) |
|---|---|---|---|---|
| 1 | Ireland | Tony Fagan | 1967–1987 | 590 (431) |
| 2 | England | Tony Stenson | 1968–1984 | 387 (290) |
| 3 | Ireland | Raffaele Cretaro | 2000–2005, 2007–2009, 2011–2020 | 381 (311) |
| 4 | Scotland | Johnny Armstrong | 1951–1964 | 380 (228) |
| 5 | Ireland | Gavin Dykes | 1987–1996 | 323 (255) |
| 6 | Ireland | Harry McLoughlin | 1977–1989 | 315 (275) |
| 7 | Ireland | David Cawley | 2012-2015, 2018–2023 | 312 (249) |
| 8 | Ireland | David Pugh | 1963–1967, 1969–1978 | 308 (236) |
| 9 | Ireland | Martin McDonnell | 1979–1984, 1990–1997 | 284 (214) |
| 10 | Ireland | Conor O'Grady | 1998–2001, 2005–2010 | 281 (239) |

=== All-time top scorers ===
| Ranking | Nationality | Name | Years | Goals |
|---|---|---|---|---|
| 1 | Scotland | Johnny Armstrong | 1952–1964 | 138 |
| 2 | Ireland | Padraig Moran | 1993–2001 | 82 |
| 3 | Ireland | Raffaele Cretaro | 2001–2005, 2007–2009, 2011–2020 | 82 |
| 4 | Ireland | Paul McGee | 1971–1972, 1976–1978, 1984, 1991–1993 | 65 |
| 5 | Northern Ireland | Gerry McDaid | 1935–1936 | 64 |
| 6 | Ireland | Paul McTiernan | 2002–2006, 2008–2009 | 62 |
| 7 | Ireland | Gerry Mitchell | 1961–1975 | 60 |
| 8 | Ireland | Paddy Monaghan | 1932–1939 | 57 |
| 9 | England | Gary Hulmes | 1977–1979, 1980, 1987 | 53 |
| 10 | Ireland | Brendan Bradley | 1979–1982 | 51 |

=== Top league goalscorers ===
| Ranking | Nationality | Name | Years | Goals |
|---|---|---|---|---|
| 1 | Scotland | Johnny Armstrong | 1952–1964 | 85 |
| 2 | Ireland | Padraig Moran | 1993–2001 | 62 |
| 3 | Ireland | Paul McTiernan | 2002–2006, 2008–2009 | 50 |
| 4 | England | Gary Hulmes | 1977–1979, 1980, 1987 | 50 |
| 5 | Ireland | Paul McGee | 1971–1972, 1976–1978, 1984, 1991–1993 | 50 |
| 6 | Ireland | Raffaele Cretaro | 2001–2005, 2007–2009, 2011–2020 | 50 |
| 7 | Ireland | Gerry Mitchell | 1961–1975 | 46 |
| 8 | Ireland | Brendan Bradley | 1980–1982 | 44 |
| 9 | Ireland | Harry McLoughlin | 1978–1988 | 36 |
| 10 | England | Harry Litherland | 1937–1938 | 33 |

== Players ==
=== Current squad ===
As of 19 November 2026

Note: Flags indicate national team as defined under FIFA eligibility rules; some limited exceptions apply. Players may hold more than one non-FIFA nationality.

| No. | Pos. | Nation | Player |
|---|---|---|---|
| 1 | GK | NIR | Liam Hughes |
| 3 | DF | NIR | Sean Stewart |
| 9 | FW | IRL | Luke Pearce |
| 16 | MF | IRL | Carl McHugh |
| 23 | MF | IRL | Kyle McDonagh |
| 24 | FW | IRL | Jamie O'Donnell |

| No. | Pos. | Nation | Player |
|---|---|---|---|
| 28 | MF | IRL | Ryan O'Kane |
| 32 | GK | IRL | Charlie McGarvey |
| 33 | DF | CMR | Jeannot Esua |
| 46 | DF | IRL | Conor Reynolds |
| 52 | DF | IRL | Gareth McElroy |

== Technical staff ==
| Position | Staff |
|---|---|
| Manager | (England) Darren Purse |
| Assistant manager | (Northern Ireland) Warren Feeney |
| Head of academy | (Republic of Ireland) Conor O'Grady |
| Lead strength and conditioning coach | (Republic of Ireland) Tom French |
| Goalkeeping coach | (England) Richard Brush |
| Kitman | (Republic of Ireland) Darragh Healy |

== Managerial history ==
=== 2018 ===
Liam Buckley was appointed manager on 26 October 2018. The club finished seventh during his first season in charge. Buckley guided the team to a fourth-place finish in 2020, securing European football for the following season. Buckley went one better in the 2021 season, finishing in third place and again securing European football.

=== 2017 ===
Gerard Lyttle managerial post ran from 21 April 2017 – 16 October 2018.

=== 2015 ===
- Dave Robertson managerial post ran from 19 November 2015 – 5 April 2017.
- Micky Adams managerial post ran from 4 August 2015 – 2 November 2015.
- Joseph N'Do & Gavin Dykes caretaker posts ran from 26 June 2015 – 4 August 2015.

=== 2014 ===
- Owen Heary managerial post ran from 26 October 2014 – 26 June 2015.
- Gavin Dykes caretaker post ran from 18 September 2014 – 26 October 2014.
- John Coleman managerial post ran from 21 June 2014 – 18 September 2014.

John Coleman and his assistant Jimmy Bell joined Sligo Rovers in June 2014, tasked with getting Rovers back into the Europa League for 2015. Ultimate Coleman failed in his goals, although Rovers did get through a round against FK Banga Gargždai. Rovers went on to Beat Rosenborg BK away, but lost the home leg and were eliminated. John and Jimmy left for Accrington Stanley F.C. in September but are returning for a friendly against Sligo Rovers.

=== 2012 ===
- Ian Baraclough managerial post ran from 27 February 2012 – 19 June 2014.

Former Scunthorpe United boss Baraclough succeeded Cook after he left for Accrington Stanley. He became boss 5 days before the 2012 Airtricity League began. The job is the 41 year old's first since being sacked by "The Iron" in March 2011. Guided Sligo to their first league title since 1977, in 2012.

=== 2007 ===
- Paul Cook managerial post ran from 27 April 2007 – 13 February 2012.

Liverpool born Cook is a former professional footballer whose clubs included Burnley and Coventry City. He previously managed Southport, becoming their first full-time manager since 1978. Prior to this Cook was a first-team coach with Accrington Stanley In the 2010 season Cook led the club to one of its most successful seasons ever winning the FAI Ford Cup and the EA Sports Cup and finishing 3rd in the Airtricity League. In 2011 he achieved back-to-back FAI Ford Cup victories, beating Shelbourne in the final on penalties. Cook left for Accrington on 13 February 2012 two weeks before the new season.

=== 2006 ===
- Rob McDonald managerial post ran from 14 November 2006 – 6 March 2007. Took charge of only one competitive game, a 1–1 draw on 18 November 2006 against Bray Wanderers at the Carlisle Grounds, Bray.
- Sean Connor resigned 2 November 2006. Belfast native succeeded in getting the team promoted to the Premier Division in 2005 but left in controversial circumstances with only a few games left in the 2006 season.

=== 2001 ===
- Don O'Riordan came to the club after a successful period with Galway United. However, with Rovers he failed to build a side capable of challenging for promotion although he did lay the groundwork for the club's highly successful Youth policy and he gave a number of locals their Senior debuts in the eircom League. O'Riordan and Sligo Rovers parted ways in the summer of 2004.

=== 1999 ===
- Tommy Cassidy had previously managed in Cyprus and Northern Ireland, could do little to reverse the slide in Rovers' fortunes following the departure of previous manager Jim McInally and they were relegated from the Premier Division. Cassidy came close to getting Rovers back up as they were in contention right up until the final day of the 2000–01 season when they lost 4–1 to Home Farm Everton.
- Jim McInally came to the Showgrounds at the start of the 1999–00 season but early results didn't go his way and he left the club for personal reasons.
- Nicky Reid was one of Jimmy Mullen's last signings and the former Manchester City player was asked to take charge. In his first season as player-manager, he took the club on its longest ever unbeaten run – which saw them claim the League Cup in February 1998, beating Shelbourne over two legs in the final (Reid also captained the side). His second season didn't go as well and the club just escaped relegation from the top flight on the final day thanks to a 2–0 win against Derry City. Reid was then released from his contract and he returned to England, where he went back to university to study for a degree in Sports Rehabilitation.

=== 1996 ===
- Jimmy Mullen came to the club after a good spell with Burnley but his reign at the Showgrounds was short-lived and he left the club due to family reasons in July 1997.

=== 1995 ===
- Steve Cotterill. Before Lawrie Sanchez left in 1995, he recommended that Sligo appoint Cotterill and that proved to be a wise decision as he led the club to third place in the Premier Division of the National League and his side also reached the League Cup final (Rovers were beaten on penalties by Shelbourne). Cotterill was then offered the position of manager of Cheltenham Town, who he brought from non-League football into the Football League winning the FA Trophy along the way.

=== 1994 ===
- Lawrie Sanchez. Prior to his appointment with Rovers, Sanchez was best known for scoring the winning goal for Wimbledon in the 1988 FA Cup Final against Liverpool. Sanchez built on the good work done by McStay with his professionalism rubbing off on everyone at the Showgrounds. He led the club to semi-final of the FAI Cup where they were beaten by Shelbourne.

=== 1992 ===
- Willie McStay. In two years McStay lead Rovers to an historic treble, when they won the 1993–94 First Division, First Division Shield and the FAI Cup. In 1994, the Scot left Rovers just before the start of the new season after being approached by Celtic, his former club as a player.

=== 1989 ===
- Dermot Keely guided Sligo to their highest finish in a decade in the Premier Division with a fifth-place finish in 1990–91.

=== 1934-1988 ===
- 1988 David Pugh
- 1986 Gerry Mitchell
- 1982 Paul Fielding
- 1979 Patsy McGowan
- 1979 Ian McKechnie
- 1974 Billy Sinclair
- 1973 Len Vallard
- 1972 Jim McDonnell
- 1971 David Pugh and Gerry Mitchell
- 1968 Ken Turner
- 1967 Ken Bartley
- 1966 Shay Keogh
- 1963 Johnny Robinsonl
- 1961 Peter Farrell
- 1960 Alex Rollo
- 1959 Seán Thomas
- 1955 Tommy McLead
- 1955 Hugh Colvin
- 1953 Jimmy Batten
- 1953 Jock McCosh and Charlie Howley
- 1953 John Black
- 1951 Jock Shearer
- 1951 Dick Groves
- 1950 Bob Mooney
- 1950 Tommy Wright
- 1949 Alan Fletcher
- 1948 Sam Waters
- 1937 Billy Miller
- 1937 Bob McAuley
- 1936 Jimmy Surgeoner
- 1935 James McCann
- 1934 Bob Preston

== The Showgrounds ==
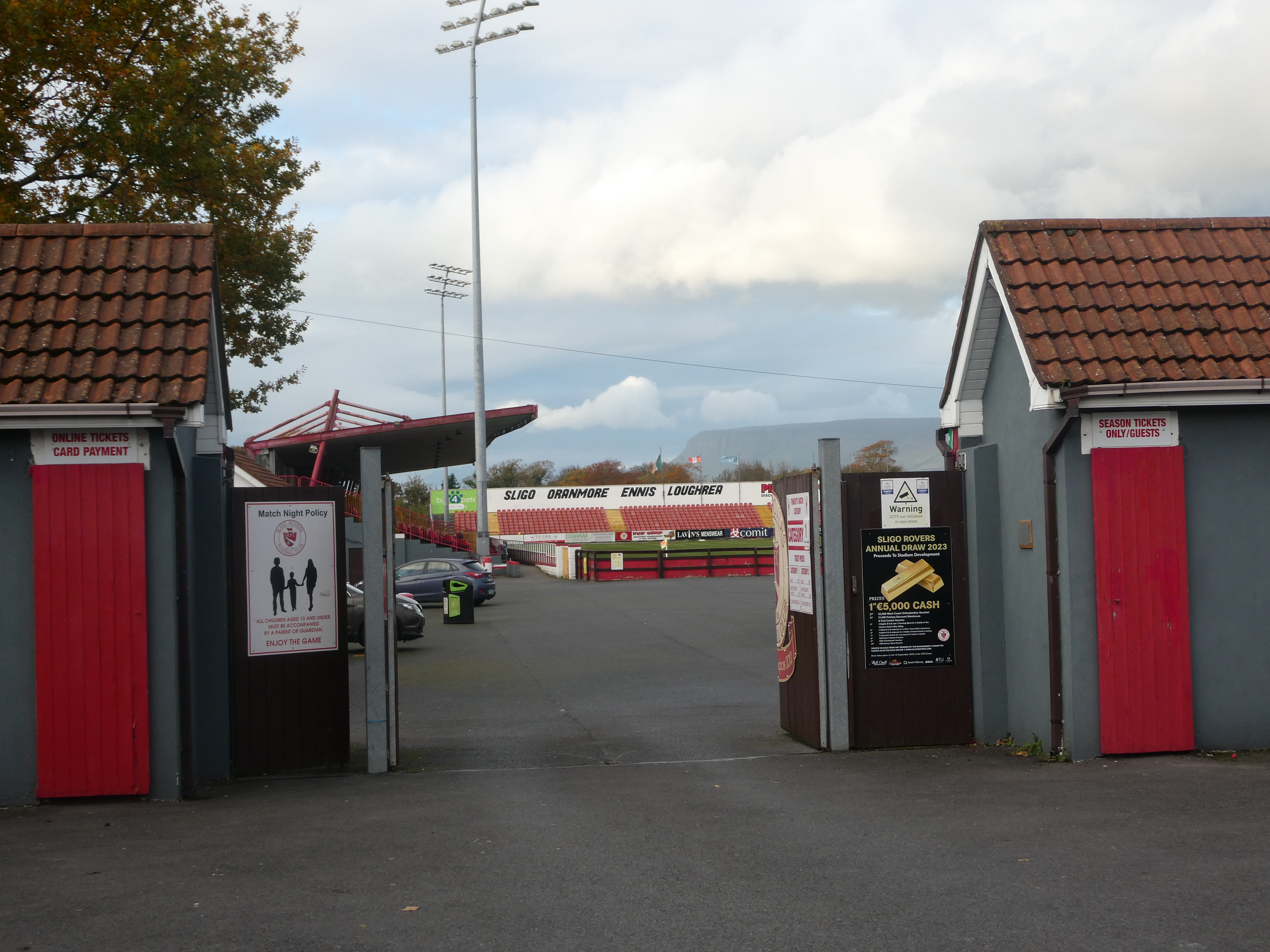
Entrance to ground

Sligo Rovers have played their entire history at the Showgrounds, located in the Maugheraboy area of Sligo town. They are one of very few League of Ireland clubs never to have changed grounds. The Showgrounds takes its name from the annual show held at the grounds by the County Sligo Agricultural Society. It is owned by the people of Sligo and cannot be sold for use for any purpose other than sport and leisure. It is one of the oldest grounds in the country but it has seen a lot of development in recent years thanks to the hard work of several volunteers.

=== Treacy Avenue Stand ===
The largest stand in the ground is the Treacy Avenue Stand with 1,800 covered seats. Also known as the Main Stand, the stand is situated on the western side of the stadium and contains the dugouts and technical area. The stand also contains the dressing rooms and press box. It was built in 2001, replacing a much older stand.

=== Jinks Avenue Stand ===
Located opposite the Treacy Avenue Stand is the Jinks Avenue Stand. Opened on 8 November 1978, this stand has close to 900 covered seats. These were installed in the late 1990s. The stand is part-reserved for away support, while the stand is also occupied by Sligo Rovers' ultras, known as Forza Rovers. The stadium's TV gantry is located on the roof of the stand which was converted to an all-seater in 2008.

=== Railway End ===
In July 2012, a new stand was completed at the Railway End consisting of 1,300 seats. Originally known as the Volkswagen Bank End — as the project was funded by Volkswagen Bank — the stand was renamed to the Pet Stop Stand in 2020 after a new sponsorship deal was agreed.

=== Church Hill Road End ===
The Church Hill Road End is located to the south of the ground. Formerly a terraced area known as the Shed, the stand was partially covered until 2006 when it was turned into a car park. This end gets its name from the shed it used to have where Sligo Rovers' most vocal supporters would congregate until it had to be demolished for health and safety reasons. There is currently no structure at this end of the ground.

=== Sean Fallon Centre ===
Adjacent to the Jinks Avenue Stand is the Sean Fallon Centre, an artificial turf football pitch located within The Showgrounds. Named after former player Sean Fallon, the centre opened in 2014 and is used as a training facility as well as the home ground for the club's academy teams.

== Notable former players ==
Republic of Ireland internationals

- (Republic of Ireland) Seamus Coleman
- (Republic of Ireland) Owen Elding
- (Republic of Ireland) Sean Fallon
- (Republic of Ireland) Peter Farrell
- (Republic of Ireland) Johnny Kenny
- (Republic of Ireland) Sean Maguire
- (Republic of Ireland) Paul McGee
- (Republic of Ireland) Alan Moore
- (Republic of Ireland) Richie Ryan

=== Internationals ===
- (Australia) James Meredith
- (Barbados) Llewellyn Riley
- (Barbados) Alvin Rouse
- (Barbados) Riviere Williams
- (Bermuda) Dante Leverock
- (Benin) Romauld Boco
- (Cameroon) Joseph N'Do
- (Canada) Jordan Hamilton
- (Canada) Kris Twardek
- (Estonia) Frank Liivak
- (Estonia) Sander Puri
- (Estonia) Bogdan Vaštšuk
- (England) Barry Bridges
- (England) Dixie Dean
- (Faroe Islands) Stefan Radosavljevic
- (Haiti) Pascal Millien
- (Jamaica) Romeo Parkes
- (Kenya) Jonah Ayunga
- (Libya) Éamon Zayed
- (New Zealand) Ryan De Vries
- (New Zealand) Max Mata
- (New Zealand) Nando Pijnaker
- (New Zealand) Oskar van Hattum
- (Northern Ireland) Billy Hamilton
- (Northern Ireland) Steve Jones
- (Puerto Rico) Kupono Low
- (Scotland) Colin Cameron
- (Scotland) Jim Lauchlan
- (Scotland) Jim McInally
- (Scotland) Willie McStay
- (Saint Vincent and the Grenadines) Wesley Charles
- (Uganda) Melvyn Lorenzen
