= Chris Rutherford =

English footballer

Personal information
- Date of birth: 1955 (age 70–71)
- Place of birth: Liverpool, England
- Position: Centre-back

Youth career
- 1970–1975: Cardiff City

Senior career*
| Years | Team | Apps | (Gls) |
| 1975–1984 | Sligo Rovers | | |
- * Club domestic league appearances and goals

Chris Rutherford (born 1955) is an English former professional footballer who played for League of Ireland club Sligo Rovers.

== Playing career ==
Liverpool-born Rutherford was given a free transfer from Cardiff City at 20 years old, after failing to break into the first team. He then accepted the offer of a professional contract from Sligo Rovers and quickly became an important player at The Showgrounds. During his second season with the Border Region club he scored in a decisive win over Shamrock Rovers which secured the 1976–77 League of Ireland title. He also helped the club win the 1982–83 FAI Cup, although he was taken off injured 20 minutes into the final win over Bohemians. A broken leg sustained in a 1984–85 League of Ireland Cup tie against Galway United ended Rutherford's playing career at the age of 28. He made 281 appearances for Sligo Rovers and was inducted into the club's Hall of Fame in November 2019.

== Coaching career ==
Rutherford served as manager of Strand Celtic in the Sligo/Leitrim junior league and then of Finn Harps in the League of Ireland First Division. He returned to Sligo Rovers and was assistant to several different managers. While serving as caretaker manager in 1994, he oversaw Sligo Rovers' first ever win in European competition, a 1–0 home win over Floriana in the 1994–95 UEFA Cup Winners' Cup. He left Sligo Rovers in 1999 on the appointment of Jim McInally as player-manager.

== Personal life ==
During and after his football career, Rutherford worked as a glazier for Sligo Glass. After settling in Sligo he married Sligonian woman Bernadette Verdon and converted to Roman Catholicism. They have two daughters, Nina and Gemma, as well as a son, Stuart. The footballer Emma Hansberry is his niece.

== Honours ==
Sligo Rovers

- League of Ireland (1): 1976–77
- FAI Cup (1): 1982–83
