= Paddy Monaghan =

Irish footballer

Personal information
- Position: Forward

Senior career*
Years	Team	Apps	(Gls)
1932–39	Sligo Rovers		

International career
1935	Irish Free State	2	(0)
- * Club domestic league appearances and goals

Paddy "Monty" Monaghan was an Irish footballer who played for Sligo Rovers and the Irish Free State national team.

Monaghan played for Sligo before they entered senior football, winning the Leinster Senior League, the Metropolitan Cup and the FAI Intermediate Cup. He played in the club's first senior match in 1934, against St James's Gate in the League of Ireland Shield. He went on to make a total of 165 appearances for Sligo Rovers, scoring 96 goals, of which 57 were in senior football. He was part of the Sligo team that won the 1936-37 League of Ireland title and reached the 1939 FAI Cup Final. He played twice for the Irish Free State, against Switzerland and Germany in 1935; he is the only Sligo Rovers player to have represented Ireland at full international level.

== Honours ==
Sligo Rovers

- League of Ireland: 1936–37
