= 2014 Setanta Sports Cup final =

- Event: 2014 Setanta Sports Cup
Dundalk	Sligo Rovers
(Republic of Ireland)	(Republic of Ireland)
0	1
- Date: 10 May 2014
- Venue: Tallaght Stadium, Dublin
- Referee: Arnold Hunter (Fermanagh)
- Attendance: 2,600

The 2014 Setanta Sports Cup final was the final match of the 2014 Setanta Sports Cup, an all-Ireland association football competition. The match took place on 10 May 2014 in Tallaght Stadium. Sligo Rovers secured their first ever Setanta Sports Cup title with a 1–0. The only goal came when John Russell slipped in Greene whose low cross was finished by Paul O'Conor at the near post. The match was played in near monsoon conditions.

10 May 2014
16:00 IST

Dundalk (Republic of Ireland)	0–1	(Republic of Ireland) Sligo Rovers
	Report	O'Conor 13'

Tallaght Stadium, Dublin
Attendance: 2,600
Referee: Arnold Hunter (Fermanagh)
