= Gerard Lyttle =

Northern Irish footballer and manager

Gerard Lyttle (born 27 November 1977) is a Northern Irish football manager and former football player, who is the assistant manager of NIFL Premiership club Cliftonville.

== Playing career ==
A right-sided or central midfielder, he began his youth career with Star Of The Sea before signing a professional contract with Celtic in December 1994 where he entered the youth team pool. After a further transitional season in 1994–95, Lyttle made more frequent U-18 appearances the following year and moved up to the reserves ahead of the 1996–97 season. Following a season at that level, Lyttle moved on loan to Swindon Town in July 1997. His time at the club was cut short by injury and he returned to Celtic to make more reserve appearances throughout 1997–98.

Lyttle departed Celtic in 1998 and signed for Peterborough United. As he again struggled to make inroads into the first team after a single League Cup outing in August 1998 against Reading, Lyttle was sent to non-league Kingstonian, but again managed only a single appearance on 4 December 1999. After seeing out 1999–00 with a spell at Northampton Town, a return to Northern Ireland beckoned at the end of the season.

Lyttle went on to play for Irish League sides Ballymena United, Newry City, Cliftonville, Lisburn Distillery and Cliftonville again, before dropping into the junior ranks with Newington YC in 2006.

Throughout his playing career, Lyttle was capped 8 times for Northern Ireland U21s, and also received caps at U16 and U18 level.

== Managerial career ==
Lyttle took charge of junior club Malachians in 2009. He then joined the coaching set-up at Cliftonville, taking temporary charge following Tommy Breslin's resignation in September 2015. He was awarded the post permanently the following month. Lyttle led the club to the 2015–16 Northern Ireland Football League Cup following a victory over second-tier side Ards F.C. in the final. Lyttle resigned in April 2017 to take the post of manager at Sligo Rovers. Lyttle won 31 of his 69 league games in charge at Cliftonville.

Despite taking over a squad which finished 5th in the League of Ireland the previous year, Sligo only narrowly avoided relegation in Lyttle's first season, recording a 9th place finish. Sligo Rovers removed Lyttle from his post in October 2018.

In June 2023, Lyttle was appointed as assistant manager of Cliftonville, under Jim Magilton.
