= 1958 FAI Cup final =

- Event: 1957–58 FAI Cup
Dundalk	Shamrock Rovers
1	0
- Date: 20 April 1958
- Venue: Dalymount Park, Dublin
- Referee: D.H. Howell (Birmingham)
- Attendance: 27,000

The 1958 FAI Cup final was the final match of the 1957–58 FAI Cup, a knock-out association football competition contested annually by clubs affiliated with the Football Association of Ireland. It took place on Sunday 20 April 1958 at Dalymount Park in Dublin, and was contested by Dundalk and Shamrock Rovers. Dundalk won 1–0 to win their fourth FAI Cup.

== Background ==
The two sides' four previous meetings that season had seen two heavy defeats for Dundalk, followed by two victories. Dundalk had finished eighth in the League and seventh in the Shield, during what was a lean time in the club's history. They were playing in their seventh FAI Cup final, having won the previous three - most recently in 1952, which was also the last time they had won a trophy to that point. To reach the final they had defeated Cork Hibernians (1–0), Limerick in the next round (3–0 in a replay following a 0–0 draw), and Shelbourne in the semi-final (1–0).

Shamrock Rovers had finished as runners-up in the 1957–58 League of Ireland, and had already won that season's Shield, Dublin City Cup and Leinster Senior Cup. Rovers were already dominating the Cup's "roll of honour", having won 13 finals to that point – most recently two years earlier. On their way to the final they had defeated non-League Chapelizod (4–1), Sligo Rovers (3–2 in a replay), and St Patrick's Athletic (1–0).

== Match ==
=== Summary ===
Shamrock Rovers were heavy favourites heading into the final, although some pundits felt Dundalk's recent victories had unsettled Rovers, and noted how Dundalk had belied their poor league form by making their way to the final without conceding a goal in any of the previous rounds. The match itself was evenly contested, although Rovers hit the woodwork once in each half. But they looked vulnerable from long balls up the middle of the pitch, and it was from one of these that inside-right Hubie Gannon benefited. The former Rovers player raced between the two Rovers centre backs and reached the ball before the advancing Rovers keeper, Christy O'Callaghan, to head home. Within minutes Rovers won a penalty, but Liam Hennessy missed the spot-kick, and the Rovers challenge faded. The surprise outcome of the match was summed up by the Irish Press headline, "The team that did not have an earthly chance wins the F.A.I. Cup Final". In the process of scoring what turned out to be the winner, Gannon broke his jaw and missed the celebrations, having to spend a week in hospital.

=== Details ===
20 April 1958
15:30

Dundalk	1–0	Shamrock Rovers
Hubie Gannon 72'	Report

Dalymount Park, Dublin
Attendance: 27,000
Referee: D.H. Howell (Birmingham)

Dundalk	Shamrock Rovers

(Northern Ireland) Ted McNeill
(Republic of Ireland) Joe Ralph
(United States) Kenny Finn
(Republic of Ireland) Leo McDonagh
(Republic of Ireland) Johnny Robinson
(Republic of Ireland) Shay Noonan
(Republic of Ireland) Niall McGahon
(Republic of Ireland) Hubert Gannon
(Republic of Ireland) Vincent Gilmore
(Northern Ireland) George Toner
(Republic of Ireland) Tommy Kerr

(Republic of Ireland) Christy O'Callaghan
(Republic of Ireland) Mickey Burke
(Republic of Ireland) Gerry Mackey
(Republic of Ireland) Ronnie Nolan
(Republic of Ireland) Tommy Farrell
(Republic of Ireland) Liam Hennessy
(Republic of Ireland) Maxie McCann
(Republic of Ireland) Sean Carroll
(Republic of Ireland) Paddy Ambrose
(Republic of Ireland) Paddy Coad
(Republic of Ireland) Liam Tuohy
