= Christy O'Callaghan =

Irish association footballer (died 2009)

Personal information
- Date of birth: 1933 or 1934
- Place of birth: Dublin, Irish Free State
- Date of death: 18 January 2009 (aged 75–76)
- Place of death: Dublin, Republic of Ireland
- Position: Goalkeeper

Youth career
- –1951: Shamrock Rovers

Senior career*
Years	Team	Apps	(Gls)
1951–????	Shamrock Rovers		
- Longford Town
????–1962	St Patrick's Athletic		
1962–????	Drogheda		

International career
1955–1956	League of Ireland XI	3	(0)
- * Club domestic league appearances and goals

Christy O'Callaghan (1933 or 1934 – 18 January 2009) was an Irish association footballer who played as a goalkeeper.

== Career ==
O'Callaghan began his career at Shamrock Rovers, joining the club's first team in 1951. With the club, he played in three FAI Cup finals in 1955, 1956, and 1958, notably colliding with Hubert Gannon in the 1958 final against Dundalk, which resulted in Gannon suffering a fractured jaw. However, by 1956, he began getting phased out of the first team following the arrival of Oldham Athletic goalkeeper Eamonn D'Arcy.

In March 1959, he almost signed for Irish League club Distillery, but was prevented from doing so due to business reasons, and by 1960, he was playing for Longford Town, and later played for St Patrick's Athletic. In August 1962, he signed for newly-formed Drogheda F.C..

O'Callaghan made three appearances for the League of Ireland XI, including twice against a Hessenliga XI, and once against The Football League XI in September 1956, although was replaced by Dinny Lowry for their following match against the Scottish Football League XI.

== Personal life and death ==
O'Callaghan had a twin brother, who also played as a footballer, and represented the League of Ireland XI. He died on 18 January 2009, following an illness.
