= Mickey Burke =

Mickey Burke may refer to:

- Mickey Burke (footballer) (died 1993), Irish football player
- Mickey Burke (hurler) (born 1927), Irish retired hurler
