= 2025 SFAI Gaynor Cup =

Association football tournament in Republic of Ireland

Tournament details
- Country: Ireland
- Venue: University of Limerick
- Dates: 2 June 2025 – 6 June 2025
- Teams: 27

Final positions
- Champions: Limerick District (1st title)
- Runners-up: Dublin District

Tournament statistics
- Matches played: 76
- Goals scored: 213 (2.8 per match)
- Top goal scorer: Ellie Byrne (6 goals)

The 2025 SFAI Gaynor Cup was the 14th edition of the premier underage inter-league competition for women's association football teams in Ireland. 24 inter-league representative teams from the Republic of Ireland entered, as well as three from Northern Ireland, South Belfast, the previous year's runners-up, Lisburn Castlereagh, and Derry, who were making their debut in the tournament. The competition began on 2 June 2025 with the group stage and concluded on 6 June 2025 with the Cup final. The tournament was staged at the University of Limerick, which had hosted the previous 11 editions. Limerick District won the Cup final, beating DDSL 1-0.

== Format ==
The competition consisted of 27 representative inter-league teams, split into 6 groups of 4 teams and one group of 3. Seeding is decided based on the team's finish the year before. The winner's of each group progressed into the Cup quarter-finals, with one team receiving a bye to the semi-final due to an uneven number of teams in the draw, the second-place team goes into the same stage of the Bowl competition, with one team receiving a bye to the semi-finals, as well as the third-place into the Shield, one team once again receiving a bye to the semi-finals, and the fourth place team enters into the Trophy, with two teams receiving a bye into the semi-final stage. Placement matches are played to determine each position for losing quarter and semi-finalists.

Games are played over two halves of 30 minutes, for a total of 60 minutes, with games in the knockout phase going straight to penalties, with the exception of the final, where games go to extra-time before penalties.

== Pitches ==
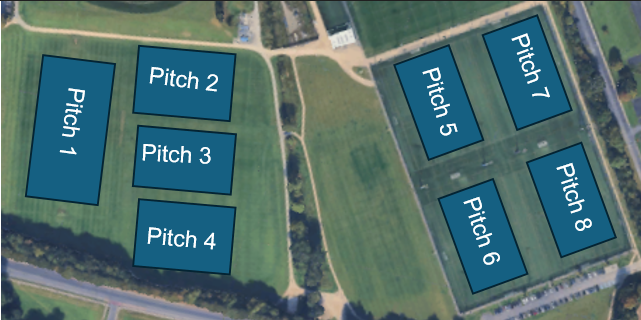
Satellite view of Gaynor Cup pitches 2025

The image (left) is the pitch layout detailed in the official Gaynor Cup programme. Pitches 1–4 are grass pitches, whilst Pitches 5–8 are AstroTurf. The pitches are located in the Maguire's Fields part of University of Limerick, and have staged the SFAI Gaynor Cup and SFAI Kennedy Cup's since 2013 and 1993 respectively. The finals of each competition took place on either Pitch 1 or 2.

== Teams ==
Team	Manager	Captain
Carlow	Alan Smith	Ellie Maher
Clare	Daniel Doran	Roisin Moloney
Cork	Steven Mulcahy	Lily Sexton
DDSL	Kay McKenna	Pixie Keddy & Hattie Farrell
Derry	Christy McGeehan	Grace O'Neill
Donegal	John Frances Doogan	Ava Greer
Galway	Shane Fitzgerald	Kym McNulty
Inishowen	Alison McGonagle	Aimee McLoughlin
Kerry	Danny Maguire	Eabha Maguire
Kildare	Claire Murphy	Katie Murphy
Kilkenny	Alan Condon	Katie Mullins
Limerick County	Rory O'Connor	Clodagh Hourigan
Limerick Desmond	Alan Faulkner	Ciara Loftus
Limerick District	Donal Magee	Grace Geary
Lisburn Castlereagh	Fiona Mooney	Daisy Ferguson
Longford	Michael Nevin	Lucy Mallon
Louth	Robbie Corr	Maisie Ball
Mayo	John Butler	Rheanna Hoban
Midlands	Henry Hilliard	Ellie Buckley
NERL	Paddy Allen	Lucia Kelliher
North Tipperary	Paul Hearty	Zoe Nash
Roscommon	David Brady	Katie Dunleavy
Sligo-Leitrim	Aisling Herbert	Sophie Herbert
South Belfast	Aaron Agnew	Lara Longridge
Tipperary South	John Cremins	Niamh Dunphy
Waterford	Lucinda Shrubb	Maia Stokes
Wexford	Bernard Clancy	Emma Fitzpatrick

== Group Stage ==
The draw for the group stage was done on 26th May 2025 on the SFAI Facebook page. The team finishing in the top position in each of the seven groups progress to the Cup, while the 2nd, 3rd and 4th (if applicable), advance to the Bowl, Shield and Trophy respectively. Three points were awarded for a win, with one for a draw and none for a defeat.

All times are local, BST (UTC+1).

In the following tables:

- Pld = total games played
- W = total games won
- D = total games drawn (tied)
- L = total games lost
- GF = total goals scored (goals for)
- GA = total goals conceded (goals against)
- GD = goal difference (GF−GA)
- Pts = total points accumulated

Tiebreakers

1. Points in head-to-head matches among tied teams;
2. Goal difference in all group matches;
3. Goal difference in head-to-head matches among tied teams;
4. Goals scored in all group matches;

=== Group 1 ===
Pos	Team	Pld	W	D	L	GF	GA	GD	Pts	Qualification
1	DDSL	3	3	0	0	7	0	+7	9	Qualification for the Cup path
2	NERL	3	1	1	1	2	2	0	4	Qualification for the Bowl path
3	Donegal	3	1	1	1	2	3	−1	4	Qualification for the Shield path
4	Derry	3	0	0	3	0	6	−6	0	Qualification for the Trophy path

Rules for classification: 1) Points; 2) Goal difference; 3) Goals scored
2 June 2025
16:00

DDSL	1–0	NERL
Niamh Morrish 38'

Pitch 1
Referee: Elaine Casey
2 June 2025
16:00

Donegal	1–0	Derry
Tara McDaid 21'

Pitch 2
Referee: Grainne Hannigan

3 June 2025
10:00

Derry	0–4	DDSL
		Kasey Deegan 15, 22 Isabella MacLeod 35, 56

Pitch 5
Referee: Phil McGrath
3 June 2025
10:00

NERL	1–1	Donegal
Roise Dorgan 15'		Tara McDaid 55'

Pitch 6
Referee: James Galvin

3 June 2025
16:00

DDSL	2–0	Donegal
Faith Dawson 32' Isabella MacLeod 38'

Pitch 3
Referee: Alan Kinkead
3 June 2025
16:00

NERL	1–0	Derry
Siofra Curley 23'

Pitch 4
Referee: Grainne Hannigan

=== Group 2 ===
Pos	Team	Pld	W	D	L	GF	GA	GD	Pts	Qualification
1	Limerick District	3	3	0	0	7	2	+5	9	Qualification for the Cup path
2	Galway	3	1	1	1	3	3	0	4	Qualification for the Bowl path
3	Longford	3	1	1	1	2	3	−1	4	Qualification for the Shield path
4	Limerick Desmond	3	0	0	3	2	6	−4	0	Qualification for the Trophy path

Rules for classification: 1) Points; 2) Goal difference; 3) Goals scored
2 June 2025
16:00

Galway	0–2	Limerick District
		Rhiann Nolan-Cantillon 11' Zoe McNamara 52'

Pitch 3
Referee: Ellie O'Sullivan
2 June 2025
16:00

Longford	1–0	Limerick Desmond
Sarah Connolly 42'

Pitch 4
Referee: Rhona Cleary

3 June 2025
10:00

Limerick Desmond	0–2	Galway
		Ellie Harty O'Brien 2' Matilda Carroll 15'

Pitch 1
Referee: Thomas Quinn
3 June 2025
10:00

Limerick District	2–0	Longford
Paige Morgan 25' Aoife Grant 57'

Pitch 2
Referee: Daniel Doherty

3 June 2025
16:00

Galway	1–1	Longford
Ellie Harty O'Brien 48'		Leah Waters 58'

Pitch 5
Referee: Lucy O'Sullivan
3 June 2025
16:00

Limerick District	3–2	Limerick Desmond
Grace Geary 23' Anna Meaney 41' Sarah Hayes 49'		Anna O'Grady 46, 51

Pitch 6
Referee: Katie Rowan

=== Group 3 ===
Pos	Team	Pld	W	D	L	GF	GA	GD	Pts	Qualification
1	Roscommon	3	2	0	1	8	3	+5	6	Qualification for the Cup path
2	Midlands	3	2	0	1	6	2	+4	6	Qualification for the Bowl path
3	North Tipperary	3	2	0	1	5	4	+1	6	Qualification for the Shield path
4	Clare	3	0	0	3	2	12	−10	0	Qualification for the Trophy path

Rules for classification: 1) Points; 2) Goal difference; 3) Goals scored
2 June 2025
16:00

North Tipperary	1–2	Roscommon
Tara Hanrahan 50'		Kayla Costello 13' Aoibhinn Cregg 27'

Pitch 6
Referee: Karen Connolly
2 June 2025
16:00

Midlands	4–0	Clare
Laurie Finnegan 8' Ciara Hilliard 47' Isabel Mooney 58' Ellie Buckley 59'

Pitch 5
Referee: Chloe Kenna

3 June 2025
10:00

Roscommon	1–2	Midlands
Ava Hogan 42'		Laurie Finnegan 35' Moya Kilmartin 51'

Pitch 3
Referee: Michael Kiely
3 June 2025
10:00

Clare	2–3	North Tipperary
Aizea Keane 53' Anna Madigan 57'		Hailee Tanner 3' Zoe Nash 30' Madison Deane 30+3

Pitch 4
Referee: Anne-Marie Lynch

3 June 2025
16:00

Midlands	0–1	North Tipperary
		Zoe Nash 21'

Pitch 1
Referee: Chloe Kenna
3 June 2025
16:00

Clare	0–5	Roscommon
		Ava Hogan 8, 50, 55 Lauren Gunning 50' Kayla Costello 60+2

Pitch 2
Referee: Grace Hayes

=== Group 4 ===
Pos	Team	Pld	W	D	L	GF	GA	GD	Pts	Qualification
1	Wexford	2	2	0	0	6	1	+5	6	Qualification for the Cup path
2	Kildare	2	1	0	1	2	3	−1	3	Qualification for the Bowl path
3	South Belfast	2	0	0	2	0	4	−4	0	Qualification for the Shield path

Rules for classification: 1) Points; 2) Goal difference; 3) Goals scored
2 June 2025
18:00

South Belfast	0–1	Kildare
		Leah O'Donoghue 22'

Pitch 7
Referee: Lucy O'Sullivan
3 June 2025
12:00

Kildare	1–3	Wexford
Amy Martin 6'		Kayla Coade Flynn 15' Emma Fitzpatrick 25' Ellie Byrne 46'

Pitch 5
Referee: Emer Slattery
3 June 2025
12:00

South Belfast	0–3	Wexford
		Emma Fitzpatrick 30, 30+1 Ellie Byrne 35'

Pitch 3
Referee: Eilish Reid

Group 4 had 3 teams due to there being an uneven number of teams in the competition.

=== Group 5 ===
Pos	Team	Pld	W	D	L	GF	GA	GD	Pts	Qualification
1	Mayo	3	2	0	1	4	3	+1	6	Qualification for the Cup path
2	Tipperary South	3	1	1	1	3	3	0	4	Qualification for the Bowl path
3	Kilkenny	3	1	1	1	3	3	0	4	Qualification for the Shield path
4	Louth	3	0	2	1	2	3	−1	2	Qualification for the Trophy path

Rules for classification: 1) Points; 2) Goal difference; 3) Goals scored
2 June 2025
18:00

Mayo	2–1	Tipperary South
Saoirse Reynolds 11, 51		Farrah Madigan 24'

Pitch 1
Referee: Keelin Fitzgerald
2 June 2025
18:00

Kilkenny	1–1	Louth
Lavena Fogarty 8'		Ellie Malone 53'

Pitch 2
Referee: Erin Bardon

3 June 2025
12:00

Louth	0–1	Mayo
		Saoirse Reynolds 8'

Pitch 6
Referee: Anne Marie Murphy
3 June 2025
12:00

Tipperary South	1–0	Kilkenny
Niamh Dunphy 28'

Pitch 7
Referee: Erin Bardon

3 June 2025
18:00

Mayo	1–2	Kilkenny
Kate Mc Ging 50'		Brooke Quirke 21, 40

Pitch 4
Referee: Keelin Fitzgerald
3 June 2025
18:00

Tipperary South	1–1	Louth
Niamh Dunphy 16'		Anna May Lynch 50'

Pitch 5
Referee: Ellie O'Sullivan

=== Group 6 ===
Pos	Team	Pld	W	D	L	GF	GA	GD	Pts	Qualification
1	Cork	3	2	1	0	8	2	+6	7	Qualification for the Cup path
2	Kerry	3	2	0	1	8	4	+4	6	Qualification for the Bowl path
3	Carlow	3	1	1	1	7	4	+3	4	Qualification for the Shield path
4	Inishowen	3	0	0	3	3	16	−13	0	Qualification for the Trophy path

Rules for classification: 1) Points; 2) Goal difference; 3) Goals scored
2 June 2025
18:00

Carlow	1–2	Kerry
Goda Gambickaite 14'		Arina Sucaci 28' Orlaith Flynn 60'

Pitch 3
Referee: Grace Hayes
2 June 2025
18:00

Cork	5–1	Inishowen
Laura O'Mullane 16' Michela Moynihan 32, 46 Mia Quille 39, 43		Ella Callaghan 29'

Pitch 4
Referee: Eilish Reid

3 June 2025
12:00

Inishowen	1–5	Carlow
Emily McLaughlin 47'		Emily Carpenter 5, 20 Grainne Keogh 37' Natalia Deka 39' Goda Gambickaite 54'

Pitch 1
Referee: Michael Meehan
3 June 2025
12:00

Kerry	0–2	Cork
		Amy Nash 17'; Laura O'Mullane 26'

Pitch 2
Referee: Timothy O'Sullivan

3 June 2025
18:00

Carlow	1–1	Cork
Emily Carpenter 30'		Mia Quille 43'

Pitch 6
Referee: Elaine Casey
3 June 2025
18:00

Kerry	6–1	Inishowen
Ellie Cregan 7, 23 Alannah Daly 36' Lillian Slattery 52' Isabelle O'Connor 55' Orlaith Flynn 60+1		Adah Gill 22'

Pitch 7
Referee: Hannah O'Brien

=== Group 7 ===
Pos	Team	Pld	W	D	L	GF	GA	GD	Pts	Qualification
1	Waterford	3	2	1	0	13	1	+12	7	Qualification for the Cup path
2	Limerick County	3	1	2	0	3	1	+2	5	Qualification for the Bowl path
3	Sligo-Leitrim	3	1	0	2	6	4	+2	3	Qualification for the Shield path
4	Lisburn	3	0	1	2	0	16	−16	1	Qualification for the Trophy path

Rules for classification: 1) Points; 2) Goal difference; 3) Goals scored
2 June 2025
18:00

Sligo-Leitrim	0–2	Limerick County
		Clodagh Hourigan 4' Roisin Farrell 6'

Pitch 5
Referee: Katie Rowan
2 June 2025
18:00

Waterford	10-0	Lisburn
Lily Codd 12, 33 Kate Mannix 22, 39 Maia Stokes 25, 29 Vittoria Tullia Pascolini 46, 53, 57 Clara Cullinan 50'

Pitch 6
Referee: Hannah O'Brien

3 June 2025
12:00

Lisburn	0–6	Sligo-Leitrim
		Willow McMorrow 18' Sophie Herbert 20, 31, 43 Susan Martin-Vaquero 23' Teagan Fallon 45'

Pitch 3
Referee: Elaine Casey
3 June 2025
12:00

Limerick County	1–1	Waterford
Erin O'Connor 56'		Vittoria Tullia Pascolini 17'

Pitch 4
Referee: Rhona Cleary

3 June 2025
18:00

Sligo-Leitrim	0–2	Waterford
		Maia Stokes 9' Ruby Hallinan 47'

Pitch 1
Referee: Anthony Morrison
3 June 2025
18:00

Limerick County	0–0	Lisburn

Pitch 2
Referee: Bobby Coonan

== Knockout stage ==
In the knockout stage, if a match was level at the end of regular time (two periods of 30 minutes), it was immediately followed by a penalty shoot-out to determine the winner, with the exception of each final, where two ten-minute periods of extra-time were mandated.

=== Cup Path ===
The draw for the Cup path quarter-finals and semi-finals took place on the evening of 3 June, after the end of the group stage. One team, Roscommon were drawn to have a bye to the semi-finals, with the remaining six teams drawn into three quarter-finals.

==== Bracket ====
Quarter-finals
4 June
Waterford	0
Limerick District	1
Roscommon	/
bye	/
4 June
DDSL	3
Mayo	1
4 June
Wexford	1 (3)
Cork (p)	1 (4)

Semi-finals
5 June
Limerick District (p)	1 (4)
Roscommon	1 (3)
5 June
DDSL	2
Cork	0

Final
6 June
Limerick District	1
DDSL	0
Third place
6 June
Roscommon	0
Cork	3

=== Quarter-finals ===
4 June 2025
16:00

Waterford	0–1	Limerick District
		Rhiann Nolan-Cantillon 54'

Pitch 1
Referee: Elaine Casey

4 June 2025
16:00

DDSL	3–1	Mayo
Aoibhe Galvin 15'; Faith Dawson 23'; Isabella MacLeod 53'		Saoirse Reynolds 57'

Pitch 4
Referee: Chloe Kenna

4 June 2025
16:00

Wexford	1–1	Cork
Ellie Byrne 19'		Amy Nash 55'
Penalties
(penalty missed) Emma Fitzpatrick; (penalty scored) Orlaith Burke; (penalty scored) Carla Fox; (penalty scored) Ellie Byrne; (penalty missed) Caoimhe Keating	3–4	(penalty scored) Clara Nash; (penalty scored) Amy Nash; (penalty scored) Mia Quille; (penalty missed) Michela Moynihan; (penalty scored) Fia Comerford

Pitch 2
Referee: Eilish Reid

==== 5/6/7 Play-offs ====
The three losing quarter-finalists, Waterford, Mayo and Wexford all played each other for the 5th, 6th and 7th places.

Pos	Team	Pld	W	D	L	GF	GA	GD	Pts	Qualification
1	Wexford	2	2	0	0	7	1	+6	6	5th
2	Mayo	2	1	0	1	1	3	−2	3	6th
3	Waterford	2	0	0	2	1	5	−4	0	7th

Rules for classification: 1) Points; 2) Goal difference; 3) Goals scored
5 June 2025
11:00

Mayo	0–3	Wexford
		Ellie Byrne 20' Amelia Tobin 24' Emma Fitzpatrick 49'

Pitch 5
Referee: Michael Meehan

5 June 2025
17:00

Wexford	4–1	Waterford
Ellie Byrne 16, 58 Fiadh Daly 28' Aisha Samadi 40'		Molly Dooling 42'

Pitch 7
Referee: Thomas Quinn

6 June 2025
12:00

Waterford	0–1	Mayo
		Kate Mc Ging 24'

Pitch 5
Referee: Hannah O'Brien

=== Semi-finals ===
The 3 winning quarter-finalists advanced to the semi-final stage, joining Roscommon, who had advanced automatically with a bye. The draw for the semi-finals was conducted immediately after the quarter-final draw on 3 June.

5 June 2025
14:00

Limerick District	1–1	Roscommon
Lily-Rose Noonan 11'		Ava Hogan 42'
Penalties
(penalty missed) Paige Morgan; (penalty scored) Aoife Grant; (penalty scored) Zoe McNamara; (penalty scored) Anna Meaney; (penalty scored) Mia McLoughlin	4-3	(penalty missed) Ava Hogan; (penalty scored) Kayla Farnham; (penalty scored) Lillian Fleming; (penalty scored) Kate Devaney; (penalty missed) Eve Lawrence

Pitch 1
Referee: Eilish Reid

5 June 2025
16:00

DDSL	2–0	Cork
Daisy Fleming 44'; Kasey Deegan 55'

Pitch 1
Referee: Hannah O'Brien

=== Third place match ===
6 June 2025
10:00

Roscommon	0–3	Cork
		Aoife Madden 15'; Rebecca Greene 29 (o.g.); Fia Comerford 54'

Pitch 1
Referee: Karen Connolly

=== Final ===
6 June 2025
15:00

Limerick District	1–0	DDSL
Rhiann Nolan-Cantillon 54'

Pitch 1
Referee: Elaine Casey

=== Bowl Path ===
The draw for the Bowl path quarter-finals and semi-finals took place on the evening of 3 June, after the end of the group stage. One team, Midlands were drawn to have a bye to the semi-finals, with the remaining six teams drawn into three quarter-finals.

==== Bracket ====
Quarter-finals
4 June
NERL	2
Kerry	4
Midlands	/
bye	/
4 June
Galway	6
Limerick County	0
4 June
Kildare	1
Tipperary South	2

Semi-finals
5 June
Kerry	1 (3)
Roscommon (p)	1 (5)
5 June
Galway	8
Tipperary South	1

Final
6 June
Midlands	0
Galway	2
Third place
6 June
Kerry	3
Tipperary South	0

=== Quarter-finals ===
4 June 2025
14:00

NERL	2–4	Kerry
Ava Hickey 33'; Lily Byrne 57'		Ava Harty 3'; Alice O'Connor 13'; Nessa Kirby 22, 45

Pitch 4
Referee: Keelin Fitzgerald

4 June 2025
14:00

Galway	6–0	Limerick County
Matilda Carroll 6, 11, 57; Cliodhna Martin 10, 47; Ava Gallagher 53'

Pitch 2
Referee: Katie Rowan

4 June 2025
14:00

Kildare	1–2	Tipperary South
Lia Nolan 41'		Niamh Dunphy 26, 36

Pitch 1
Referee: Daniel Doherty

==== 12/13/14 Play-offs ====
The three losing quarter-finalists, NERL, Limerick County and Kildare all played each other for the 12th, 13th and 14th places.

Pos	Team	Pld	W	D	L	GF	GA	GD	Pts	Qualification
1	Limerick County	2	2	0	0	2	0	+2	6	12th
2	NERL	2	1	0	1	0	1	−1	3	13th
3	Kildare	2	0	0	2	0	1	−1	0	14th

Rules for classification: 1) Points; 2) Goal difference; 3) Goals scored
5 June 2025
11:00

NERL	0–1	Limerick County
		Caoimhe Buckley 35'

Pitch 6
Referee: Emer Slattery

5 June 2025
17:00

Limerick County	1–0	Kildare
Erin O'Connor 18'

Pitch 6
Referee: Anthony Morrison

6 June 2025
12:00

Kildare	0–0	NERL
Penalties
(penalty scored) Leah O'Donoghue; (penalty missed) Lia Nolan; (penalty scored) Emily Steed; (penalty scored) Amy Martin; (penalty scored) Katie Murphy	4-5	(penalty scored) Claire McMoreland; (penalty scored) Lily Byrne; (penalty scored) Siofra Curley; (penalty scored) Pearl Powderly; (penalty scored) Isabelle McKeever

Pitch 6
Referee: Anne-Marie Lynch

=== Semi-finals ===
The 3 winning quarter-finalists advanced to the semi-final stage, joining Midlands, who had advanced automatically with a bye. The draw for the semi-finals was conducted immediately after the quarter-final draw on 3 June.

5 June 2025
16:00

Kerry	1–1	Midlands
Nessa Kirby 16'		Holly Grennan 5'
Penalties
(penalty scored) Ava Harty; (penalty scored) Eabha Maguire; (penalty scored) Nessa Kirby; (penalty missed) Alannah Crossan	3–5	(penalty scored) Moya Kilmartin; (penalty scored) Anna Phillips; (penalty scored) Laurie Finnegan; (penalty scored) Ciara Hilliard; (penalty missed) Isabel Mockler

Pitch 2
Referee: Keelin Fitzgerald

5 June 2025
14:00

Galway	8–1	Tipperary South
Mairead Mullins 3'; Katie Brogan 8'; Cliodhna Martin 22'; Mairead Mulkerins 38, 41; Ava Gallagher 44'; Siun Cullinan 48, 52		Doireann Scully 55'

Pitch 2
Referee: Grainne Hannigan

=== Tenth place match ===
6 June 2025
10:00

Kerry	3–0	Tipperary South
Lillian Slattery 15'; Alannah Daly 38'; Nessa Kirby 44'

Pitch 5
Referee: Keelin Fitzgerald

=== Final ===
6 June 2025
12:45

Midlands	0–2	Galway
		Ellie Harty O'Brien 5, 10

Pitch 2
Referee: Eilish Reid

=== Shield Path ===
The draw for the Shield path quarter-finals and semi-finals took place on the evening of 3 June, after the end of the group stage. One team, Sligo-Leitrim were drawn to have a bye to the semi-finals, with the remaining six teams drawn into three quarter-finals.

==== Bracket ====
Quarter-finals
4 June
Kilkenny	2 (3)
South Belfast (p)	2 (4)
Sligo-Leitrim	/
bye	/
4 June
Donegal (p)	0 (4)
Carlow	0 (3)
4 June
Longford	0
North Tipperary	1

Semi-finals
5 June
South Belfast	3
Sligo-Leitrim	0
5 June
Donegal	1 (2)
North Tipperary	1 (3)

Final
6 June
South Belfast	1
North Tipperary	0
Third place
6 June
Sligo/Leitrim	2
Donegal	0

=== Quarter-finals ===
4 June 2025
16:00

Kilkenny	2–2	South Belfast
Emma Walsh 13'; Lavena Fogarty 19'		Abby Magowan 34'; Sophie Nelson 41'
Penalties
(penalty scored) Emma Walsh; (penalty missed) Lavena Fogarty; (penalty scored) Mia van Eeden; (penalty missed) Alison Walsh; (penalty scored) Jenna Trait; (penalty missed) Katie Mullins	3-4	(penalty missed) Georgia McGibbon; (penalty scored) Darcy Grayson; (penalty missed) Aoife Conlon; (penalty scored) Summer White; (penalty scored) Emilie Sylvester; (penalty scored) Nicole Morrow

Pitch 7
Referee: Hannah O'Brien

4 June 2025
16:00

Donegal	0–0	Carlow
Penalties
(penalty scored) Ava Greer; (penalty scored) Emily Doogan; (penalty missed) Brooke Johnston; (penalty scored) Tara McDaid; (penalty scored) Megan McGinley	4-3	(penalty scored) Emily Carpenter; (penalty scored) Kallie Dunne; (penalty scored) Ellie Maher; (penalty scored) Laura Malone; (penalty scored) Evie Stynes

Pitch 6
Referee: Grainne Hannigan

4 June 2025
14:00

Longford	0–1	North Tipperary
		Jenna McSherry 39'

Pitch 5
Referee: Alan Kinkead

==== 19/20/21 Play-offs ====
The three losing quarter-finalists, Kilkenny, Carlow and Longford all played each other for the 19th, 20th and 21st places.

Pos	Team	Pld	W	D	L	GF	GA	GD	Pts	Qualification
1	Kilkenny	2	2	0	0	2	0	+2	6	19th
2	Longford	2	1	0	1	0	1	−1	3	20th
3	Carlow	2	0	0	2	0	1	−1	0	21st

Rules for classification: 1) Points; 2) Goal difference; 3) Goals scored
5 June 2025
11:00

Kilkenny	1–0	Carlow
Aoibhe Meegan 9'

Pitch 7
Referee: Anne Marie Murphy

5 June 2025
17:00

Carlow	1–3	Longford
Kate Murphy 59'		Leah Waters 13, 49, 58

Pitch 5
Referee: Phil McGrath

6 June 2025
12:00

Longford	1–1	Kilkenny
Leah Waters 49'		Brooke Quirke 56'
Penalties
(penalty missed) Leah Waters; (penalty scored) Sophie McKeon; (penalty scored) Paulina Dygas; (penalty scored) Sarah Connolly; (penalty scored) Sophie Coyle	4-5	(penalty scored) Brooke Quirke; (penalty scored) Emma Walsh; (penalty scored) Aoibhe Meegan; (penalty scored) Ruby Collins; (penalty scored) Mia van Eeden

Pitch 7
Referee: Erin Bardon

=== Semi-finals ===
5 June 2025
16:00

Donegal	1–1	North Tipperary
Amy Lateef 52'		Madison Deane 32'
Penalties
(penalty scored) Ava Greer; (penalty missed) Emily Doogan; (penalty missed) Brooke Johnston; (penalty scored) Tara McDaid	2–3	(penalty missed) Alanna O'Carroll; (penalty missed) Zoe Nash; (penalty scored) Ciara Austin; (penalty scored) Hailee Tanner; (penalty scored) Emma Austin

Pitch 4
Referee: Rhona Cleary

5 June 2025
14:00

South Belfast	3–0	Sligo-Leitrim
Ellie Fegan 33'; Darcy Grayson 41'; Emilie Sylvester 60+1

Pitch 4
Referee: Katie Rowan

=== Seventeeth place match ===
6 June 2025
10:00

Donegal	0–2	Sligo-Leitrim
		Sophie Herbert 1'; Susan Martin-Vaquero 59'

Pitch 6
Referee: Grainne Hannigan

=== Final ===
6 June 2025
11:00

South Belfast	1–0	North Tipperary
Aoife Conlon 21'

Pitch 1
Referee: Rhona Cleary

=== Trophy Path ===
Six teams entered the Gaynor Trophy, the six 4th place teams in the group stage. 2 teams, Derry and Clare, were handed a bye to the semi-final stage, with the remaining four contesting two quarter-finals.

==== Bracket ====
Quarter-finals
4 June
Inishowen	1 (2)
Louth (p)	1 (4)
Derry	/
bye	/
4 June
Lisburn	1
Limerick Desmond	7
Clare	/
bye	/

Semi-finals
5 June
Louth	3
Derry	1
5 June
Limerick Desmond	0
Clare	2

Final
6 June
Louth	1
Clare	0
Third place
6 June
Derry	0
Limerick Desmond	3

=== Quarter-finals ===
4 June 2025
14:00

Inishowen	1–1	Louth
Ellen McLaughlin 47'		Rosie Fox 14'
Penalties
(penalty missed) Caitlin Atherton; (penalty scored) Lexi Donaughey; (penalty scored) Aimee McLaughlin; (penalty missed) Amber Loughrey	2-4	(penalty scored) Eabha Byrne; (penalty scored) Mia van der Westhuizen; (penalty scored) Rosie Fox; (penalty scored) Sophia Mackin

Pitch 6
Referee: Rhona Cleary

4 June 2025
14:00

Lisburn	1–7	Limerick Desmond
Rhia Smith 25'		Jean O'Kane 12, 21; Anna O'Grady 18, 25; Sonyia Vijandra 32, 60; Neasa Reidy 36'

Pitch 5
Referee: Karen Connolly

==== 26th place match ====
The two losing quarter-finalists, Inishowen and Lisburn, played each other for 26th place.

5 June 2025
14:00

Inishowen	2–0	Lisburn
Emily McLaughlin 40'; Aimee McLaughlin 51'

Pitch 5
Referee: Anne-Marie Lynch

=== Semi-finals ===
5 June 2025
12:00

Louth	3–1	Derry
Maisie Ball 20'; Rosie Fox 38'; Hillary Adeniran 50'		Mia van der Westhuizen 36 (o.g.)

Pitch 1
Referee: Karen Connolly

5 June 2025
12:00

Limerick Desmond	0–2	Clare
		Michaela Sexton 34, 58

Pitch 2
Referee: Erin Bardon

=== Twenty-fourth place match ===
6 June 2025
10:00

Derry	0–3	Limerick Desmond
		Jean O'Kane 32'; Elise Vang 42'; Neasa Reidy 52'

Pitch 7
Referee: Anne-Marie Murphy

=== Final ===
With it being a final, and therefore having the possibility of going to extra-time, the game was 0–0 at full-time, and was therefore the only game in the tournament to go to extra time, with a Hillary AAdeniran goal winning it for Louth.

6 June 2025
11:00

Louth	1–0 (a.e.t.)	Clare
Hillary Adeniran 68'

Pitch 2
Referee: Katie Rowan

== Statistics ==
=== Goalscorers ===
In total, 213 goals were scored, with two credited as own goals. Goals scored from penalty shoot-outs are not counted.

Ellie Byrne was awarded the Pádraig Hartnett Golden Boot for scoring six goals.

6 goals

- Ellie Byrne (Wexford)

5 goals

- Ava Hogan (Roscommon)
- Leah Waters (Longford)

4 goals

- Vittoria Tullia Pascolini (Waterford)
- Isabella MacLeod (DDSL)
- Emma Fitzpatrick (Wexford)
- Niamh Dunphy (Tipperary South)
- Nessa Kirby (Kerry)
- Ellie Harty O’Brien (Galway)
- Sophie Herbert (Sligo-Leitrim)
- Anna O’Grady (Limerick Desmond)

3 goals

- Saoirse Reynolds (Mayo)
- Emily Carpenter (Carlow)
- Mia Quille (Cork)
- Maia Stokes (Waterford)
- Kasey Deegan (DDSL)
- Rhiann Nolan-Cantillon (Limerick District)
- Matilda Carroll (Galway)
- Cliodhna Martin (Galway)
- Brooke Quirke (Kilkenny)
- Jean O’Kane (Limerick Desmond)

2 goals

- Tara McDaid (Donegal)
- Laurie Finnegan (Midlands)
- Zoe Nash (North Tipperary)
- Kayla Costello (Roscommon)
- Michela Moynihan (Cork)
- Goda Gambickaite (Carlow)
- Laura O’Mullane (Cork)
- Ellie Cregan (Kerry)
- Orlaith Flynn (Kerry)
- Lily Codd (Waterford)
- Kate Mannix (Waterford)
- Faith Dawson (DDSL)
- Amy Nash (Cork)
- Kate Mc Ging (Mayo)
- Erin O’Connor (Limerick County)
- Alannah Daly (Kerry)
- Lillian Slattery (Kerry)
- Mairead Mulkerins (Galway)
- Ava Gallagher (Galway)
- Siun Cullinan (Galway)
- Lavena Fogarty (Kilkenny)
- Madison Deane (North Tipperary)
- Susan Martin-Vaquero (Sligo-Leitrim)
- Sonyia Vijandra (Limerick Desmond)
- Rosie Fox (Louth)
- Michaela Sexton (Clare)
- Hillary Adeniran (Louth)
- Emily McLaughlin (Inishowen)
- Neasa Reidy (Limerick Desmond)

1 goals

- Niamh Morrish (DDSL)
- Roise Dorgan (NERL)
- Siofra Curley (NERL)
- Zoe McNamara (Limerick District)
- Sarah Connolly (Longford)
- Paige Morgan (Limerick District)
- Aoife Grant (Limerick District)
- Grace Geary (Limerick District)
- Sarah Hayes (Limerick District)
- Anna Meaney (Limerick District)
- Tara Hanrahan (North Tipperary)
- Aoibhinn Cregg (Roscommon)
- Ciara Hilliard (Midlands)
- Isabel Mooney (Midlands)
- Ellie Buckley (Midlands)
- Moya Kilmartin (Midlands)
- Aizea Keane (Clare)
- Anna Madigan (Clare)
- Hailee Tanner (North Tipperary)
- Lauren Gunning (Roscommon)
- Leah O’Donoghue (Kildare)
- Amy Martin (Kildare)
- Kayla Coade Flynn (Wexford)
- Farrah Madigan (Tipperary South)
- Ellie Malone (Louth)
- Anna May Lynch (Tipperary South)
- Arina Sucaci (Kerry)
- Ella Callaghan (Inishowen)
- Grainne Keogh (Carlow)
- Natalia Deka (Carlow)
- Isabelle O’Connor (Kerry)
- Adah Gill (Inishowen)
- Clodagh Hourigan (Limerick County)
- Roisin Farrell (Limerick County)
- Clara Cullinan (Waterford)
- Willow McMorrow (Sligo-Leitrim)
- Teagan Fallon (Sligo-Leitrim)
- Ruby Hallinan (Waterford)
- Aoibhe Galvin (DDSL)
- Amelia Tobin (Wexford)
- Fiadh Daly (Wexford)
- Aisha Samadi (Wexford)
- Molly Dooling (Mayo)
- Lily-Rose Noonan (Limerick District)
- Daisy Fleming (DDSL)
- Aoife Madden (Cork)
- Fia Comerford (Cork)
- Ava Hickey (NERL)
- Lily Byrne (NERL)
- Ava Harty (Kerry)
- Alice O’Connor (Kerry)
- Lia Nolan (Kildare)
- Caoimhe Buckley (Limerick County)
- Holly Grennan (Midlands)
- Doireann Scully (Tipperary South)
- Mairead Mullins (Galway)
- Katie Brogan (Galway)
- Emma Walsh (Kilkenny)
- Abby Magowan (South Belfast)
- Sophie Nelson (South Belfast)
- Jenna McSherry (North Tipperary)
- Aoibhe Meegan (Kilkenny)
- Kate Murphy (Carlow)
- Amy Lateef (Donegal)
- Ellie Fegan (South Belfast)
- Darcy Grayson (South Belfast)
- Emilie Sylvester (South Belfast)
- Aoife Conlon (South Belfast)
- Ellen McLaughlin (Inishowen)
- Rhia Smith (Lisburn)
- Maisie Ball (Louth)
- Aimee McLaughlin (Inishowen)
- Elise Vang (Limerick Desmond)

Own goals

- Roscommon-Rebecca Greene (against Cork)
- Louth-Mia van der Westhuizen (against Derry)

== Final standings ==
Pos	Grp	Team	Pld	W	D	L	GF	GA	GD	Pts	Final result
1	2	Limerick District	6	6	0	0	10	3	+7	18	Champions
2	1	DDSL	6	5	0	1	12	2	+10	15	Runners-up
3	6	Cork	6	4	1	1	12	5	+7	13	Third place
4	3	Roscommon	5	2	0	3	9	7	+2	6	Fourth place
5	4	Wexford	5	4	0	1	14	3	+11	12	
6	5	Mayo	6	3	0	3	6	9	−3	9	
7	7	Waterford	6	2	1	3	14	7	+7	7	
8	2	Galway	6	4	1	1	19	4	+15	13	Bowl winners
9	3	Midlands	5	3	0	2	7	5	+2	9	
10	6	Kerry	6	4	0	2	16	7	+9	12	
11	5	Tipperary South	6	2	1	3	6	15	−9	7	
12	7	Limerick County	6	3	2	1	5	7	−2	11	
13	1	NERL	6	2	1	3	4	7	−3	7	
14	4	Kildare	5	1	0	4	3	6	−3	3	
15	4	South Belfast	5	3	0	2	6	6	0	9	Shield winners
16	3	North Tipperary	6	4	0	2	7	6	+1	12	
17	7	Sligo-Leitrim	5	2	0	3	8	7	+1	6	
18	1	Donegal	6	2	1	3	3	6	−3	7	
19	5	Kilkenny	6	3	1	2	7	6	+1	10	
20	2	Longford	6	2	1	3	6	4	+2	7	
21	6	Carlow	6	1	1	4	8	8	0	4	
22	5	Louth	6	3	2	1	7	5	+2	11	Trophy winners
23	3	Clare	5	1	0	4	4	13	−9	3	
24	2	Limerick Desmond	6	2	0	4	12	9	+3	6	
25	1	Derry	5	0	0	5	1	12	−11	0	
26	6	Inishowen	5	1	0	4	6	17	−11	3	
27	7	Lisburn	5	0	1	4	1	25	−24	1	

Source: FAI Connect

== Broadcasting ==
About 50% of the games were live-streamed on the SFAI YouTube channel, with cameras on Pitch 1, Pitch 2 and Pitch 6. The games on Pitch 1 were accompanied with commentary. The coverage was provided by Full Time Productions. Clips were also posted on the SFAI Facebook page.

== Aftermath ==
In the wake of the tournament, and with the Kennedy Cup to follow the next week, the SFAI YouTube channel was mass reported and taken down by YouTube, along with all of the livestreams and video clips housed on that channel. A documentary about the tournament's winners, Limerick District, along with the Kennedy Cup, was announced to have been filmed and was being produced, due to be released in 2026.
