= John Burke (footballer, fl. 1927–1935) =

Irish footballer

John Burke (fl. 1927–1935) is an Irish former footballer who played as a defender.

== Career ==
After playing for Munster junior side Cahir Park, he joined Shamrock Rovers in 1927 where he stayed until 1935. He made his debut at inside-left at Fordsons on Sunday 6 November 1927 in a 2–2 draw.

He won one senior cap for the Irish Free State on 20 April 1929 in a 4–0 friendly win against Belgium at Dalymount Park. Burke is unique in that while he won only one cap he was captain for the game.

He represented the League of Ireland XI once while at Glenmalure Park in 1929.

His son Mickey Burke later played for Rovers in the 1950s representing the club twice in European competition.

== Sources ==
- Paul Doolan; Robert Goggins. The Hoops. ISBN 0-7171-2121-6.
