= Johnville F.C. (Dublin) =

Johnville F.C. was an Irish association football club based in Dublin and active during the 1940s, 1950s and 1960s. The club had a tradition of being a nursery club for both Shamrock Rovers and Shelbourne.

Jem Kennedy, the namesake of the SFAI Kennedy Cup, was devoted to Johnville FC, he trained and scouted many notable players.

== Notable former players ==
=== Republic of Ireland internationals ===
- (Republic of Ireland) Tommy Dunne
- (Republic of Ireland) Arthur Fitzsimons
- (Republic of Ireland) Dessie Glynn
- (Republic of Ireland) Tommy Hamilton
- (Republic of Ireland) Gerry Mackey
- (Republic of Ireland) Ronnie Nolan

=== Republic of Ireland B internationals ===
- (Republic of Ireland) Eamonn Darcy

=== League of Ireland XI representatives ===
- (Republic of Ireland) Mickey Burke
- (Republic of Ireland) Eamonn Darcy

=== Manchester United players ===
- (Republic of Ireland) Paddy Kennedy

== Honours ==
- FAI Youth Cup
  - Winners: 1945–46, 1952–53: 2
  - Runners Up: 1949–50, 1957–58, 1968–69: 3
