= SFAI Gaynor Cup =

Association Football competition in Republic of Ireland

- Organiser(s): Schoolboy's Football Association of Ireland
- Founded: 2011
- Region: Republic of Ireland; Northern Ireland
- Teams: 24-32
- Current champions: Cork(1st title)
- Most championships: Metropolitan Girls League (4 titles)
- Website: www.fai.ie/competitions/womens-gaynor-cup/
- 2026

The SFAI Gaynor Cup, also known as the Gaynor Cup, is an underage association football tournament organized by the Schoolboy's Football Association of Ireland annually for representative girl's under-14 league teams across the Republic of Ireland, as well as Northern Ireland.

It is currently sponsored by Subway, and has previously been sponsored by Umbro and Fota Island Resort, and has been played every year in the University of Limerick since 2013.

== Format ==
The competition typically consists of 32 representative league teams, although most years fewer teams enter, each selecting 20 players, split into however many groups needed to make the most even spread of teams, for example the 2025 Gaynor Cup had 27 teams enter, split into 6 groups of 4 teams and one group of 3. Seeding is decided based on the team's finish the year before. The winner's of each group progress into the Cup quarter-finals, the second-place team goes into the same stage of the Bowl competition, as well as the third-place into the Shield, and the fourth place team enters into the Trophy. Placement matches are played to determine each position for losing quarter and semi-finalists. Games are played over two halves of 30 minutes, for a total of 60 minutes, with games in the knockout phase going straight to penalties, with the exception of the final, where games go to extra-time before penalties.

There has also been tournaments involving other age groups apart from under-14, and the official winners list contains teams that did not play in the under-14 age group, but the current (as of June 2025) tournament consists of under-14 teams, and the future winners will be added to the list of official winners below, not including other age group tournaments.

== History ==
Girls had been allowed to play in the boy's version of the tournament, the SFAI Kennedy Cup, with the most notable one to do so being future Olympic boxing champion and arguably greatest female boxer in history, Katie Taylor for Wicklow Schoolboys League, but it was a rare occurrence.

The tournament was founded in the early 2000s as a multi age group girls soccer competition, featuring representative teams from the provinces of Ireland, selecting players from each province's local leagues and entering teams in under-14, under-16 and under-18 level. The current format was created in 2011, with each individual league selecting and entering teams for the tournament, similar to the Kennedy Cup, the boys version of the tournament, which has been in existence since 1976.

The inaugural tournament in 2011 was won by Inishowen Girls Academy, a team hailing from the Inishowen peninsula in County Donegal. The league was the smallest in the entire tournament and had only been founded that year, but came away champions thanks to a 2–0 win over Cork Women's and Schoolgirls Soccer League (CWSSL) in the Cup final. The North Dublin Schoolboys/girls League (NDSL) won the Plate final the same year. The tournament was held in University of Galway.

The 2012 final was won by Metropolitan Girls League (MGL), representing the North Dublin and Meath area. They beat Galway & District League 1–0 in the final, Alannah McEvoy scoring the winner from the penalty spot. In 2013, the MGL secured their second title in a row with a penalty shoot-out win over CWSSL. The Galway & District League would win their first Gaynor Cup in 2014, defeating MGL in a repeat of the 2012 final, this time the scoreline being flipped as Galway ran out 1–0 winners.

The MGL would record two Gaynor Cup wins on the bounce in 2015 and 2016, beating Galway on penalties, and Cork 3-1 respectively. Galway would claim their second title with a 1–0 win over Sligo/Leitrim in 2017. The following year, Kilkenny & District Schoolgirl's League won the Gaynor Cup with a 1–0 win over Midlands League, which incidentally was the same fixture as the Kennedy Cup Bowl final that year.

Losing 2017 finalists Sligo/Leitrim would claim victory in the 2019 final decider, coming out winners against perennial Gaynor Cup finalists Metropolitan Girls League in the U13 tournament. The tournament would be cancelled in 2020 due to the COVID-19 pandemic, but would return for 2021, where the Metropolitan Girls League would win again, now split into South and North, with the South team (MGLS) beating Limerick Desmond Schoolboys/girls League 3–0 in the final in University of Limerick. The MGLS would follow up their 2021 win with a victory over 2018 finalists Midlands Schoolboys/Schoolgirls League, winning 2–0 in the 2022 final. The Midlands would once again fall at the final hurdle in 2023, this time losing in the final to Carlow & District Juvenile League on penalties, as Carlow picked up their first Gaynor Cup.

Sligo/Leitrim would win the Cup for a second time in 2024, through a Caragh Guckian extra-time winner against South Belfast Youth League.

Limerick District would win the 2025 Gaynor Cup on home soil, defeating the DDSL 1–0 in the final thanks to a late penalty by Rhiann Nolan at the University of Limerick, winning the Cup for the first time for the Limerick District Schoolchildrens League, and indeed any Limerick team, including the Limerick County and Limerick Desmond League sides. It came after wins against favourites and two-time winners Galway, Longford and 2021 finalists Limerick Desmond in the group phase, before beating Waterford 1–0 in the quarter-finals and advancing to the DDSL final on penalties against Roscommon League in the semi-finals. This was the first year that the DDSL competed in the competition, due to the dissolving of the Metropolitan Girls League, and most teams from that league transitioning to the DDSL, a league which has a record 33 Kennedy Cup wins.

In 2026, Cork, in their 4th final, won their first ever Gaynor Cup, defeating Cavan/Monaghan, Louth and Waterford in Group 2 without conceding a goal, before winning their Round of 16 tie over Tipperary South in an altered format 2-0. What would follow was a victory over Clare in the quarter-finals, a penalty shoot-out victory over 2024 winners Sligo/Leitrim, and culminating in another penalty shoot-out win over Galway in the final.

== Broadcasting ==
The tournament is regularly livestreamed on the SFAI YouTube channel and Facebook page, with 3 games simultaneously shown at the University of Limerick, coupled with commentary on one game. For the final, extra cameras and editing is introduced. Highlights are uploaded on the SFAI Facebook page throughout the week of the tournament. The livestream is produced by Full Time Productions.

== List of finals ==
Date	Winner	Score	Runners-up	Venue
2011	Inishowen	2–0	Cork	University of Galway
2012	Metropolitan Girls	1–0	Galway	Limerick
2013	Metropolitan Girls	0–0(a.e.t.) 4–2pen.	Cork	University of Limerick
2014	Galway	1–0	Metropolitan Girls	University of Limerick
2015	Metropolitan Girls	pen.	Galway	University of Limerick
2016	Metropolitan Girls League	3–1	Cork	University of Limerick
2017	Galway	1–0	Sligo/Leitrim	University of Limerick
2018	Kilkenny	1–0	Midlands	University of Limerick
2019	Sligo/Leitrim	1–0 (a.e.t.)	Metropolitan Girls North	University of Limerick
2021	Metropolitan Girls South	3–0	Limerick Desmond	University of Limerick
2022	Metropolitan Girls South	2–0	Midlands	University of Limerick
2023	Carlow	0–0(a.e.t.) 6–5pen.	Midlands	University of Limerick
2024	Sligo/Leitrim	1–0 (a.e.t.)	South Belfast	University of Limerick
2025	Limerick District	1–0	DDSL	University of Limerick
2026	Cork	2–2(a.e.t.) 3–2pen.	Galway	University of Limerick

== Performances ==
=== Performance by team ===
Rank	Team	Winners	Runners-up	Winning Years	Runners-up Years
1	Metropolitan Girls	4	1	(2012, 2013, 2015, 2016)	(2014)
2	Galway	2	3	(2014, 2017)	(2012, 2015, 2026)
2	Sligo/Leitrim	2	1	(2019, 2024)	(2017)
2	Metropolitan Girls South	2	0	(2021, 2022)	
5	Cork	1	3	(2026)	(2011, 2013, 2016)
5	Inishowen	1	0	(2011)	
5	Kilkenny	1	0	(2018)	
5	Carlow	1	0	(2023)	
5	Limerick District	1	0	(2025)	
9	Midlands	0	3		(2018, 2022, 2023)
9	Metropolitan Girls North	0	1		(2019)
9	Limerick Desmond	0	1		(2021)
9	South Belfast	0	1		(2024)
9	DDSL	0	1		(2025)

== See also ==
- SFAI Kennedy Cup
- List of association football competitions
