= Eamonn Darcy (footballer) =

Irish footballer (1933–2022)

Personal information
- Date of birth: 8 March 1933
- Place of birth: Dublin, Ireland
- Date of death: 7 November 2022 (aged 89)
- Position: Goalkeeper

Senior career*
Years	Team	Apps	(Gls)
1951–1952	Shelbourne		(0)
1952–1954	Dundalk	20	(0)
1954–1956	Oldham Athletic	45	(0)
1956–1962	Shamrock Rovers	92	(0)
1962–1968	Drumcondra	98	(0)
1968–1969	Shelbourne	0	(0)

International career
1960	League of Ireland XI	3	(0)
1960–1963	Republic of Ireland B	2	(0)

Managerial career
- 1984–1986: Republic of Ireland (women's)
- * Club domestic league appearances and goals

Eamonn Darcy (8 March 1933 – 7 November 2022) was an Irish footballer who played as a goalkeeper.

== Career ==
Nicknamed "Sheila", Darcy began at junior club Johnville before joining Shelbourne and then Dundalk After two years at Oldham Athletic he came home to join Shamrock Rovers in 1956, making his debut on 7 October, and played in the club's first four European Champion Clubs' Cup games.

Darcy earned one B cap for the Republic of Ireland national team in 1960.

Darcy played in Rovers' trip to the US and Canada in the summer of 1961. He left for Drumcondra in December 1962. Darcy saved a penalty in the League of Ireland's win over the English League XI in October 1963.

In August 1967, Darcy had his testimonial. He signed for Shels again in May 1968.

Darcy managed the Republic of Ireland women's national team in the 1980s and Newbridge Town F.C. in the 1990s.

== Personal life and death ==
Darcy died on 7 November 2022, at the age of 89.

== Honours ==
Shamrock Rovers

- League of Ireland: 1956–57, 1958–59
- League of Ireland Shield: 1957–58, 1962–63
- Leinster Senior Cup: 1956, 1957, 1958
- Dublin City Cup: 1956–57, 1957–58, 1959–60
- Top Four Cup: 1957–58

Drumcondra

- League of Ireland: 1964–65

== Sources ==
- Paul Doolan; Robert Goggins. The Hoops. ISBN 0-7171-2121-6.
