= Ted McNeill =

English footballer

Personal information
- Full name: Edward Vincent McNeill
- Date of birth: 26 March 1929
- Place of birth: Warrenpoint, Northern Ireland
- Date of death: April 1979 (aged 50)
- Position: Goalkeeper

Senior career*
Years	Team	Apps	(Gls)
1950–1951	Portadown		
1951–1954	Sunderland	7	(0)
1954–1955	Portadown		
1955–19??	Dundalk		
- * Club domestic league appearances and goals

Edward Vincent McNeill (26 March 1929 – April 1979) was an English professional footballer who played as a goalkeeper for Sunderland.

He died in April 1979 at the age of 50.
