= SFAI Kennedy Cup =

Association Football competition in Republic of Ireland

SFAI Umbro Kennedy Cup
- Organiser(s): Schoolboys/girls Football Association of Ireland
- Founded: 1976
- Region: Republic of Ireland; Northern Ireland
- Teams: 32
- Current champions: Limerick Desmond Schoolboy/girl League (1st title)
- Most championships: Dublin District Schoolboys League (33 titles)
- Website: www.fai.ie/competitions/umbro-kennedy-cup/
- 2025 Kennedy Cup

The SFAI Kennedy Cup also known as the SFAI Umbro Kennedy Cup or just the Kennedy Cup, is an underage association football tournament organised by the Schoolboys/girls Football Association of Ireland annually for representative boy's under-14 league teams across the Republic of Ireland, as well as Northern Ireland. It is currently sponsored by Umbro and has previously been sponsored by New Balance.

== Format ==
Unlike other SFAI national competitions, such as the U12, U14 and U16 National Cups, which feature club teams, the Kennedy Cup features teams representing the leagues in which the players compete. The competition typically consists of 32 representative league teams, each selecting 20 players, split into 8 groups of 4 teams, with seeding being decided based on the team's finish the year before. The winner's of each group progress into the Cup quarter-finals, the second-place team goes into the same stage of the Bowl competition, as well as the third-place into the Shield, and the fourth place team enters into the Trophy. The losing quarter-finalists of the Cup path are also placed into a Plate competition, with the 4 losing quarter-finalists playing for 5-8th place as well as the Plate. Placement matches are played to determine each position for losing quarter and semi-finalists of every other path. This format has been used since the 1991 edition, with the exception of 2021, with the previous format being straight knockout. Games are played over two halves of 30 minutes, for a total of 60 minutes, with games in the knockout phase going straight to penalties, with the exception of the final, where games go to extra-time before penalties.

The tournament is usually hosted over 5 or 6 days in June and since 1993, has been hosted in the University of Limerick.

== History ==
The Kennedy Cup was named after Jem Kennedy, who was notable for his training and scouting of players for the successful Dublin club Johnville F.C. in the 1950s. The Cup has an extensive history as Ireland's premier underage competition. The tournament has been held in very high prestige since its inaugural tournament in 1976, a tournament which was won by the Dublin District Schoolboys League (DDSL), the side who has comprehensively dominated the history of the competition, being crowned champions a record 33 times between the aforementioned 1976 tournament and the 2019 edition.

The DDSL defeated Cork Schoolboys League in the first final in 1976, and it would be a repeat final the following year, this time Cork running out 3-2 winners after extra-time. The only side other than the DDSL to win the tournament in the next 9 years would be the Limerick District Schoolboys League, the team representing the Limerick city area, who won the tournament in 1980 in Dublin against the DDSL.

For the next five years, the Dublin team would dominate, winning from 1981 to 1985, before the 1986 tournament, where Cork ended their 9-year drought, winning the first final not contested by the DDSL after the Cork Schoolboys League had beaten them 4-1 in the semi-final. They beat Offaly (now called Midlands) in the two-legged final by ten goals on aggregate, captained by future Irish international, Cobh Ramblers, Nottingham Forest, Manchester United and Celtic player Roy Keane.

The DDSL would add 5 more Kennedy Cup titles between 1987 and 1992 with the only exception in those years being a 1989 Cork win. In 1993 the Waterford Schoolboys League would win their first Kennedy Cup, becoming the first new winners since 1980 and Limerick District, defeating a DDSL side that had player of the tournament Damien Duff on their team. After DDSL reclaimed the title for the 14th time in 1994, their neighbours Brenfer League, now North Dublin Schoolboys League (NDSL) would clinch their first title in 1995, a tournament in which the likes of Stephen Hunt and John O'Shea played for Waterford in. Waterford would add another victory to their record 5 years after their first, with Daryl Murphy scoring two in the final as Waterford ran out comprehensive winners against Donegal in 1998.

The DDSL won for the 17th time in 1999, before Limerick District won for the second time in 2000, defeating Cork 3-1 in the final on home soil in University of Limerick, playing against a Cork side which had future Irish international Stephen Ireland in the lineup. That tournament featured the first girl to play in the tournament, 13 years before the SFAI Gaynor Cup was introduced, in the way of future Olympic boxing champion and arguably greatest female boxer in history, Katie Taylor for Wicklow Schoolboys League. Waterford won again in 2003, before the DDSL picked up a record-extending seven titles in a row between 2004 and 2010, their run eventually coming to an end in the 2011 final against local rival's NDSL, who clinched their second title and first since being re-named from the Brenfer League. The NDSL won 1-0 in the final in UL, Paddy Roche scoring the winner.

DDSL would win the next 3 Kennedy Cups until Kerry Schoolboys League became the first new winner in 20 years, defeating DDSL 1-0 in the final in 2015. The DDSL would win their 30th title against Galway the following year, securing a penalty shoot-out victory, with Belvedere striker Troy Parrott scoring the winning penalty.

The DDSL would add a further 3 wins on the trot in the coming years, including defeating first time finalists Sligo-Leitrim in 2017, beating Kildare in the 2018 decider, and culminating in a 2-0 final success over Mayo in 2019, a tournament in which Longford and District Schoolboys Soccer League became the first ever 4th seed to reach the semi-final stage of the competition. The tournament would be cancelled for the 2020 edition, and postponed, then altered in 2021, due to the COVID-19 pandemic, with South Belfast Youth League winning the 2021 tournament for the first time.

Managed by Robin O'Day Cork claimed their first title in 33 years in 2022 with a 2-0 win over Waterford, moving onto 4 titles overall, surpassing their final opponents to move into second place in the overall competition winners standings. Galway & District Schoolboy's League became the latest new winner of the Cup in 2023, defeating Midlands League 2-1 in the final of the Cup.

South Belfast secured their second title in the 2024 edition, winning 2-1 against North East Regional League (NERL). Limerick Desmond League won the Kennedy Cup for the first time in 2025, beating Donegal 2-0 in the final through goals from Dan Healy and Precieux Malonga, after eliminating DDSL in the group stages, with DDSL winning the Bowl competition.

Finals have been staged at League of Ireland grounds, at Tolka Park and the Mardyke and as curtain-raisers at Dalymount Park for FAI Cup finals.

== Broadcasting ==
The tournament is regularly livestreamed on the SFAI YouTube channel and Facebook page, with 3 games simultaneously shown at the University of Limerick, coupled with commentary on one game. For the final, extra cameras and editing is introduced. Highlights are uploaded on the SFAI Facebook page throughout the week of the tournament. The livestream is produced by Full Time Productions.

== Controversies ==
The Kennedy Cup has long been acclaimed as the most prestigious youth tournament in Ireland, showcasing the best of Irish footballing talent and attracting scouts from all over Europe, but in recent years it has lost some of its shine due to the diluting of the player pool as a result of League of Ireland academies not participating in the competition because of its non-involvement in the grassroots leagues that compete. More young players decide to join League of Ireland academies before the Kennedy Cup. After the 2022 win, Cork coach Stephen O'Sulivan said "Personally, I think it's a disgrace what was allowed to happen." "Once Cork City and Cobh Ramblers came knocking, we had only five players left from the squad we began with at an U12 tournament in Clare."

In 2023, the competition's most successful side DDSL, were told that due to their decision to disengage from the Schoolboys/girls FAI and stop paying their affiliation fees, claiming that the DDSL were under-represented at SFAI level, they were no longer eligible to enter teams in either the Kennedy Cup, or the Gaynor Cup, the girl's version of the competition. The league would eventually be allowed re-enter the following year.

== Performances ==
=== Performances by team ===
Rank	Club	Winners	Winning Years
1	Dublin & District Schoolboys League	33	(1976, 1978, 1979, 1981, 1982, 1983, 1984, 1985, 1987, 1988, 1990, 1991, 1992, 1994, 1996, 1997, 1999, 2001, 2002, 2004, 2005, 2006, 2007, 2008, 2009, 2010, 2012, 2013, 2014, 2016, 2017, 2018, 2019)
2	Cork Schoolboys League	4	(1977, 1986, 1989, 2022)
3	Waterford Schoolboys League	3	(1993, 1998, 2003)
4	Limerick & District Schoolboys League	2	(1980, 2000)
4	North Dublin Schoolboys League	2	(1995, 2011)
4	South Belfast Youth League	2	(2021, 2024)
4	Galway & District Schoolboys League	2	(2023, 2026)
7	Kerry Schoolboys League	1	(2015)
7	Limerick Desmond Schoolboy/girl League	1	(2025)

Notes:

- 1 Includes Brenfer League

== See also ==
- SFAI Gaynor Cup
- List of association football competitions
