= Mickey Burke (footballer) =

Irish footballer

Michael Burke (died 25 February 1993) was an Irish footballer who played as a right-back.

== Career ==
Born in Dublin, the son of John Burke (footballer), Burke joined Shamrock Rovers in 1951 from Johnville with Gerry Mackey and was part of the team popularly known as Coad's Colts that enjoyed many memorable days during the 1950s.

He played in Rovers' two games against Manchester United in the European Champion Clubs' Cup in 1957. A schoolboy international he was also played twelve times for the League of Ireland XI while at Glenmalure Park.

Burke signed for Drumcondra in 1959 but moved to New York City soon after and was there to cheer on the Hoops when they toured in 1961.

== Sources ==
- Paul Doolan; Robert Goggins. The Hoops. ISBN 0-7171-2121-6.
