= Gerry Mackey =

Irish footballer (1933–2021)

Personal information
- Date of birth: 10 June 1933
- Place of birth: Dublin, Ireland
- Date of death: 21 April 2021 (aged 87)
- Position: Defender

Senior career*
Years	Team	Apps	(Gls)
1951–1959	Shamrock Rovers	129	(0)
1959–1963	King's Lynn		
1963–1965	Limerick	0	(0)

International career
1956–1957	Republic of Ireland	3	(0)
1955–1958	League of Ireland XI	10	(0)
1958	Republic of Ireland B	1	(0)
- * Club domestic league appearances and goals

Gerry Mackey (10 June 1933 – 21 April 2021) was an Irish footballer.

After playing for junior side Johnville, he joined Shamrock Rovers in 1951 and made his senior debut on 13 December 1952 at Dalymount Park in a 4-1 win over Bohemians.

He played in the club's first two games in European competition and also won three senior caps for the Republic of Ireland making his debut on 3 October 1956 in a World Cup qualifying win over Denmark at Dalymount Park. His other caps came in a 3-0 friendly win over West Germany the following month and at Wembley against England the following May.

He represented the League of Ireland 10 times while at Glenmalure Park between 1955 and 1958 and also won a B cap in 1958 in a 3-2 win in Iceland. He has the unique distinction of captaining his country at schoolboy, youth and senior level.

In May 1959, Gerry shared a testimonial with Paddy Ambrose.

After four years in London he signed for Limerick F.C. in November 1963.

For four years in the 1970s, he was assistant manager to the Ireland Youths team.

He helped to form KRAM's (Keep Rovers at Milltown) first committee in 1987. His son Dave played for Rovers reserves in the 1980s and won League titles with Dundalk F.C. in the 1990s.

== Honours ==
Shamrock Rovers

- League of Ireland: 3
  - 1953/54, 1956/57, 1958/59
- FAI Cup: 2
  - 1955, 1956
- League of Ireland Shield: 4
  - 1955, 1956, 1957, 1958
- Leinster Senior Cup: 4
  - 1955, 1956, 1957, 1958
- Dublin City Cup: 4
  - 1954/55, 1956/57, 1957/58, 1959/1960
- Top Four Cup: 2
  - 1955/56, 1957/58
- LFA President's Cup: 3
  - 1956/57, 1957/58, 1959/1960

== Sources ==
- Paul Doolan; Robert Goggins (1993). The Hoops. Gill & MacMillan. ISBN 0-7171-2121-6.
- The Complete Who's Who of Irish International Football, 1945-96 (1996):Stephen McGarrigle
