= 2025–26 Leinster Senior Cup =

Association football tournament in Ireland

2025-26 Leinster Senior Cup
Leinster Football Association Senior Cup

Tournament details
- Country: Republic of Ireland
- Dates: 17 August 2025 – 30 June 2026

Final positions
- Champions: Bray Wanderers
- Runners-up: St Patrick's Athletic

Tournament statistics
- Top goal scorer(s): Aidan Keena & Sam Rooney (5 goals each)

The 2026 PTSB Leinster Senior Cup is the 122nd edition of the Leinster Football Association's primary competition. It includes Leinster based League of Ireland clubs from the Premier Division and First Division, as well as a selection of intermediate and amateur level sides. The competition began on the weekend of 17 August 2025.

The group stage round with all League of Ireland clubs entering the competition is to be retained from the previous edition.

== Round 1 ==
17 August 2025	Wicklow Rovers	3–0	Sheriff YC	Wicklow, County Wicklow
12:00				Stadium: Whitegate

== Round 2 ==
22 August 2025	Freebooters	4–1	St Patrick's AFC	Kilkenny, County Kilkenny
19:30	Afeez Ramoni 9'; Bill Trehy 19'; Paul Kiely 21'; Afeez Ramoni 35'		Eoin Carolan 80'	Stadium: Glashare; Referee: Denys Serednii

6 September 2025	Black Forge	2–4	St Peter's	Walkinstown, Dublin 12
12:30	Michael Plunkett 28'; Jordan O'Reilly 63'; Thomas Doran (penalty missed) 83'		Jonathan Kiernan 8'; Gary Kelly 37'; Gary Kelly 65'; Jordan Carr 78'	Stadium: Walkinstown Avenue; Referee: Karl Nolan

7 September 2025	Naas United	0–3	Templeogue United	Naas, County Kildare
11:00			Gerry Bambrick 60'; Gerry Bambrick 67' (pen.); Keith Nugent 83'	Stadium: Jigginstown; Referee: Eric McCann

14 September 2025	Gorey Rangers	3–0	Wicklow Rovers	Gorey County Wexford
10:00				Stadium: Altura Credit Union Park

14 September 2025	East Wall Bessborough	2–0	Carrick Rovers	Clontarf, Dublin 3
14:00				Stadium: Clontarf All Weather; Referee: Robert Redmond

14 September 2025	New Oak Boys	3–2	Evergreen	Carlow, County Carlow
11:00				Stadium: Burrin Road

== Round 3 ==
24 October 2025	Montpelier	2–0	St Mochta's	Grangegorman, Dublin 7
19:30	Bradley Kamdoum 47'; Bradley Kamdoum 75'			Stadium: Grangegorman Astro; Referee: Peter Mahoney

24 October 2025	Templeogue United	0–4	Finglas United	Templeogue, Dublin 6W
19:45			Dean Brady 45'; Dean Ivory 51' (pen.); Zack Furey 59'; Dean Ivory 90+2' (pen.)	Stadium: Tymon Park; Referee: Paul Ennis

26 October 2025	East Wall Bessborough	3–1	Gorey Rangers	Clontarf, Dublin 3
14:00	Leon Hayes 19'; Leon Hayes (penalty missed) 25'; Mark O'Connor 45+2' (pen.); Kai McKeever 50'		P. Yeates 1'	Stadium: Clontarf All Weather; Referee: Graham McCarthy

26 October 2025	Blackrock College	4–2 (a.e.t.)	New Oak Boys	Blackrock, Dublin 4
14:00	Matthew Dalton 35'; James Shiggins 45+2' (pen.); Matthew Dalton 105'; James Shiggins 118' (pen.)		Corey Harmon (red card) 43'; David Doyle 66'; David Doyle 81'; Daryl Coleman (red card) 81'	Stadium: Stradbrook Road; Referee: Brian Lawless Jr.

2 November 2025	Freebooters	1–2	St Peter's Athlone	Kilkenny, County Kilkenny
14:00	O. Hanney 48'		C. Keighery 70'; C. Keighery 90'	Stadium: Garringreen; Referee: Jason Moore

== Round 4 Group Stage ==
=== Group A ===
Team	Pld	W	D	L	GF	GA	GD	Pts
Dundalk	3	2	0	1	10	6	4	6
Shelbourne	3	2	0	1	8	6	2	6
St Peter's Athlone	3	1	0	2	7	8	2	3
Athlone Town	3	1	0	2	4	9	–5	3

==== Matchday 1 ====
11 January 2026	St Peter's Athlone	5–2	Dundalk	Athlone, County Westmeath
13:00	Jonathan Kiernan 20'; Dylan Gavin 43' (pen.); Niall Scullion 57'; Dylan Gavin 67' (pen.); Dylan Sumner 81'	Report	Darci Lawless 54' (o.g.); Luke Mulligan 60'; Enda Minogue (red card) 66'	Stadium: McCarthy Park; Referee: Declan Toland

27 January 2026	Shelbourne	4–1	Athlone Town	Clonshaugh, Dublin 9
19:30	Daniel Ring 30' (pen.); Daniel Ring 33'; Joey Wuna 54'; Daniel Ring 68'		Patrick Ferry 20'	Stadium: AUL; Referee: David Dunne

==== Matchday 2 ====
13 January 2026	Dundalk	3–1	Shelbourne	Dundalk, County Louth
19:45	Danny Mullen 42'; Eoin Kenny 52'; Eoin Kenny 82'	Report	Sheikhan Aljabir 74'	Stadium: Muirhevnamor Sports Centre; Referee: Oliver Moran

30 January 2026	Athlone Town	3–0	St Peter's Athlone	Athlone, County Westmeath
19:45	Brian McManus 37'; Niall Scullion 57' (o.g.); Derin Adewale 85'			Stadium: Athlone Town Stadium; Referee: Ray Conlon

==== Matchday 3 ====
24 January 2026	Athlone Town	0–5	Dundalk	Athlone, County Westmeath
13:00			Gbemi Arubi 21' (pen.); Harry Groome 40'; Declan McDaid 76'; Daryl Horgan 83'; Declan McDaid 84'	Stadium: Athlone Town Stadium; Referee: Mark Houlihan

18 January 2026	St Peter's Athlone	2–3	Shelbourne	Athlone, County Westmeath
13:00	Luke Kelly 31'; Jonathan Kiernan 57'; Jonathan Kiernan (red card) 84'		Joey Wuna 7'; James Bailey 35'; Joey Wuna 81' (pen.)	Stadium: McCarthy Park; Referee: Mark Moynihan

=== Group B ===
Team	Pld	W	D	L	GF	GA	GD	Pts
St Patrick's Athletic	2	2	0	0	10	3	7	6
Drogheda United	2	1	1	0	5	1	4	4
Longford Town	3	0	2	1	2	7	–5	2
Montpelier	3	0	1	2	4	10	–6	1

==== Matchday 1 ====
17 January 2026	Longford Town	1–1	Drogheda United	Ratoath, County Meath
15:00	Daragh Murtagh 49'		Jason Bucknor 22'; Brandon Kavanagh (penalty missed) 81'	Stadium: CHC Park; Referee: Declan Toland

28 March 2026	St Patrick's Athletic	5–3	Montpelier	Inchicore, Dublin 8
12:00	Aidan Keena 24'; Aidan Keena 41'; Glory Nzingo 56'; Aidan Keena 74'; Glory Nzingo 79'	Report	Lorcan Byrne 49'; Cian O'Brien 52'; Gerard Loftus 90'	Stadium: Richmond Park; Referee: Owen Murphy

==== Matchday 2 ====
Drogheda United	Cancelled	St Patrick's Athletic	Drogheda, County Louth
			Stadium: Sullivan & Lambe Park
Note: Fixture was cancelled as the result became inconsequential to qualification to the Quarter Finals.

20 January 2026	Montpelier	1–1	Longford Town	Grangegorman, Dublin 7
19:45	Ross Fay 18'		Daragh Murtagh 88'	Stadium: TUD Grangegorman; Referee: Owen Murphy

==== Matchday 3 ====
13 January 2026	Drogheda United	4–0	Montpelier	Ratoath, County Meath
19:30	Kieran Cruise 19'; Ryan Brennan 22' (pen.); Brandon Kavanagh 38' (pen.); Shane Farrell 40'			Stadium: CHC Park; Referee: Ryan Maher

24 January 2026	St Patrick's Athletic	5–0	Longford Town	Blanchardstown, Dublin 15
18:00	Aidan Keena 27'; Darragh Nugent 48'; Darragh Nugent 56'; Sam Rooney (penalty missed) 63'; Aidan Keena 71'; Barry Baggley 75'	Report		Stadium: FAI National Training Centre; Attendance: 200 (Est.); Referee: Robert Dowling

=== Group C ===
Team	Pld	W	D	L	GF	GA	GD	Pts
Blackrock College	3	2	0	1	11	8	3	6
Shamrock Rovers	3	2	0	1	6	4	2	6
East Wall Bessborough	3	1	1	1	7	9	–2	4
UCD	3	0	1	2	4	7	–3	1

==== Matchday 1 ====
16 January 2026	Blackrock College	2–3	Shamrock Rovers	Blackrock, Dublin 4
19:45	Brian Horgan 38'; Brian Horgan 74'		Josh Delves 34'; Joel McPhail 68'; Tadhg Prizeman 83'	Stadium: Stradbrook Road; Referee: Mark Houlihan

7 February 2026	UCD	2–2	East Wall Bessborough	Belfield, Dublin 4
14:00	Jayden Goad 20'; Tariq Almasry 85'		Brandon Sambrooks 2'; Scott Doyle 90+1'	Stadium: UCD Bowl; Referee: Alan Patchell

==== Matchday 2 ====
14 February 2026	Shamrock Rovers	2–0	UCD	Kingswood, Dublin 24
15:00	Matthew Britton 11'; Matthew Britton 90+3'			Stadium: Roadstone Academy; Referee: Daryl Carolyn

9 January 2026	East Wall Bessborough	3–6	Blackrock College	Clontarf, Dublin 3
19:45	Brandon Sambrooks 2'; Brandon Sambrooks 53'; Fionn O’Tighearnach 61' (o.g.)		Brian Horgan 12'; Brian Horgan 13'; Brian Horgan 39'; Matthew Dalton 67'; James Shiggins 73'; Fionn O’Tighearnach 90+3'	Stadium: Clontarf All Weather; Referee: Keith Butterly

==== Matchday 3 ====
1 February 2026	UCD	2–3	Blackrock College	Belfield, Dublin 4
14:00	Jack Cleland 51'; Leo Healy 55'		Jack Power 8'; Fergal O'Sullivan 55'; James Shiggins 90+6'	Stadium: UCD Bowl; Referee: Glen Geraghty

24 January 2026	East Wall Bessborough	2–1	Shamrock Rovers	Kingswood, Dublin 24
15:00	Brandon Sambrooks 18'; Kai McKeever 56'		Josh Delves 3'	Stadium: Roadstone Academy; Attendance: 196; Referee: Alan Patchell

=== Group D ===
Team	Pld	W	D	L	GF	GA	GD	Pts
Bray Wanderers	3	2	1	0	5	2	3	7
Finglas United	3	2	1	0	3	0	3	7
Bohemians	3	0	1	2	1	4	–3	1
Wexford	3	0	1	2	1	4	–3	1

==== Matchday 1 ====
18 January 2026	Finglas United	1–0	Bohemians	Finglas, Dublin 11
12:00	Leon McLaren 90+1'			Stadium: Larney Park; Attendance: 600 (est.); Referee: Robert Dowling

20 January 2026	Bray Wanderers	2–1	Wexford	Bray, County Wicklow
19:45	Leon Keogh 7'; Max McLaughlin 20'	Report	Mikie Rowe 5'	Stadium: Carlisle Grounds; Attendance: 150 (est.); Referee: Declan Troy

==== Matchday 2 ====
10 January 2026	Wexford	0–2	Finglas United	Crossabeg, County Wexford
17:00			Brandon Daly 49'; Anthony Donohoe 60'	Stadium: Ferrycarrig Park; Referee: Alan Franklin

6 February 2026	Bray Wanderers	3–1	Bohemians	Bray, County Wicklow
19:45	Cian Doyle 26'; Tyreik Sammy 68'; Declan Osagie 71'	Report	Christopher Conlan 50'; Aaron Culleton (red card) 90'	Stadium: Carlisle Grounds; Attendance: 325; Referee: Daryl Carolan

==== Matchday 3 ====
25 January 2026	Finglas United	0–0	Bray Wanderers	Finglas, Dublin 11
12:00		Report		Stadium: Larney Park; Referee: Daryl Carolan

31 January 2026	Bohemians	0–0	Wexford	Coolock, Dublin 5
13:00				Stadium: Oscar Traynor Centre; Attendance: Behind closed doors Referee: Declan Troy

== Quarter Final ==
24 March 2026	Shamrock Rovers	1–3	Finglas United	Kingswood, Dublin 24
19:30	Maleace Asamoah 45+1'		Adam Clarke 33'; Aaron Costello 57'; Jordan Wright 90+6'	Stadium: Roadstone Academy; Referee: Robert Dowling

14 April 2026	Dundalk	3–1	Shelbourne	Dundalk, County Louth
19:45	Tunde Anunlopo 1'; Ethan Hall 39'; Shay Casey 56'	Report	Sean Moore 88'	Stadium: Oriel Park; Referee: Daryl Carolan

20 April 2026	Bray Wanderers	1–1 (6–5 p)	Drogheda United	Bray, County Wicklow
19:45	Billy O'Neill (penalty missed) 32'; Flynn Ryan 68'	Report	Cian O'Connor 61'	Stadium: Carlisle Grounds; Attendance: 308; Referee: Robert Dowling
	Penalties
	Tyreik Sammy (penalty scored); Richard Ferizaj (penalty scored); Conor Knight (penalty scored); Kyle Tucker (penalty scored); Billy O'Neill (penalty missed); Benjamin Fagbemi (penalty scored); Flynn Ryan (penalty scored)		Jamie Brennan (penalty scored); Michael Cardo (penalty scored); Kieran Cruise (penalty missed); Shane Farrell (penalty scored); Calum Donnelly (penalty scored); Ethan Maher (penalty scored); Daniel Mare (penalty missed)

27 April 2026	St Patrick's Athletic	5–0	Blackrock College	Inchicore, Dublin 8
19:30	Sam Rooney 10'; Sam Rooney 16'; Ossie McKenna 52' (o.g.); Jason McClelland 72'; Sam Rooney 81'	Report		Stadium: Richmond Park; Referee: Oliver Moran

== Semi Final ==
18 May 2026	Finglas United	1–2	Bray Wanderers	Finglas, Dublin 11
19:00	Aaron Costello 8'; Dean Ivory (penalty missed) 41'		Ryan Kelly (red card) 24'; Billy O'Neill 29'; Billy O'Neill 66'	Stadium: Larney Park; Referee: Glen Geraghty

26 May 2026	Dundalk	0–1	St Patrick's Athletic	Dundalk, County Louth
19:45		Report	Sam Rooney 42'	Stadium: Oriel Park; Attendance: 150 (Est.); Referee: Paul McLaughlin

== Final ==
30 June 2026	Bray Wanderers	2–1	St Patrick's Athletic	Bray, County Wicklow
19:45	Conor Knight 37'; Richard Ferizaj 56'	Report	Sam Rooney 25'	Stadium: Carlisle Grounds; Attendance: 2,009; Referee: Daryl Carolan
