= Vinnie Leonard =

Irish footballer (born 2008)

Personal information
- Full name: Vincent Scott McGinley Leonard
- Date of birth: 21 March 2008 (age 18)
- Place of birth: Navan, County Meath, Ireland
- Height: 1.82 m (6 ft 0 in)
- Position: Defender

Team information
- Current team: Norwich City

Youth career
- –2022: Torro United
- 2022–2024: Dundalk

Senior career*
Years	Team	Apps	(Gls)
2024–2026	Dundalk	38	(3)
2026–	Norwich City	0	(0)

International career^{‡}
2024	Republic of Ireland U16	3	(0)
2024–2025	Republic of Ireland U17	16	(1)
2026–	Republic of Ireland U19	1	(2)
- * Club domestic league appearances and goals as of 11:04, 5 April 2026 (UTC) ‡ National team caps and goals as of 14:39, 15 November 2026 (UTC)

Vincent Scott McGinley Leonard (born 21 March 2008) is an Irish professional footballer who plays as a defender for EFL Championship club Norwich City.

== Club career ==
=== Youth career ===
A native of Kilberry in Navan, County Meath, Leonard began playing as a centre midfielder with local club Torro United. He moved to the academy of League of Ireland club Dundalk in 2022, where he was converted into a Centre back and went on to feature for the U14, U15, U17 and U20 sides, captaining the club's youth sides.

=== Dundalk ===
Leonard made his senior debut for Dundalk on 6 February 2024 in a 0–0 draw with Bohemians in the Leinster Senior Cup, becoming the youngest ever player to play for the club at 15 years, 10 months and 16 days old. On 27 October 2024, he made his League of Ireland Premier Division debut for the club in their final home game of the season in a 1–0 defeat at home to Shamrock Rovers, after his side had already been relegated to the League of Ireland First Division by finishing bottom of the table. On 22 December 2024, Leonard signed his first professional contract with the club. On 14 February 2025, in his first league start for the club, he scored the only goal of the game in a 1–0 victory over Athlone Town at Oriel Park in the first game of the season, making him the youngest ever league goalscorer at 16 years, 10 months and 24 days old. During the summer of 2025, Leonard was subject to reported interest from several clubs including Scottish Premiership Champions Celtic. On 10 October 2025, he scored in a 3–0 win over Finn Harps at Oriel Park to help his side secure the 2025 League of Ireland First Division title and promotion back to the Premier Division. He was named the club's Young Player of the Year for 2025. In November 2025, he was named in the PFAI First Division Team of the Year as voted by his fellow players in the league. In December 2025, he reportedly drew interest from Celtic, Genoa, Olympique Lyonnais, Norwich City, Crystal Palace and Brighton & Hove Albion.

=== Norwich City ===
On 16 February 2026, it was announced that an agreement had been reached between Dundalk and Norwich City for Leonard to join the EFL Championship club on 1 July 2026 when the transfer window re-opened, following his 18th birthday.

== International career ==
On 9 May 2024, Leonard made his international debut, coming off the bench for the Republic of Ireland U16s in a 3–2 defeat to Switzerland in Portugal. He was a regular for the Republic of Ireland U17 side during their qualifying campaign for the 2025 UEFA European Under-17 Championship, in which they secured World Cup qualification. Leonard was named in the squad for the 2025 FIFA U-17 World Cup in Qatar in November 2025. On 14 November 2026, he made his debut for the Republic of Ireland U19 side, scoring twice in a 2–2 draw away to France U19.

== Career statistics ==
As of match played on 23 February 2026

Appearances and goals by club, season and competition
Club	Division	Season	League		National cup (Note: Includes FAI Cup, FA Cup)		League cup (Note: Includes EFL Cup)		Other		Total	
Club	Division	Season	Apps	Goals	Apps	Goals	Apps	Goals	Apps	Goals	Apps	Goals
Dundalk	2024	LOI Premier Division	1	0	0	0	—		2 (Note: Appearance(s) in the Leinster Senior Cup)	0	3	0
Dundalk	2025	LOI First Division	34	3	1	0	—		2	0	37	3
Dundalk	2026	LOI Premier Division	3	0	0	0	—		0	0	3	0
Dundalk	Total		38	3	1	0	–		4	0	43	3
Norwich City	2026–27	Championship	0	0	0	0	0	0	—		0	0
Career total			38	3	1	0	0	0	4	0	43	3

== Honours ==
Dundalk

- League of Ireland First Division: 2025
- Leinster Senior Cup: 2024–25

Individuals

- Dundalk Young Player of the Year: 2025
- PFAI First Division Team of the Year: 2025
