= 2026 Dundalk F.C. season =

Irish football season

Dundalk
2026 season
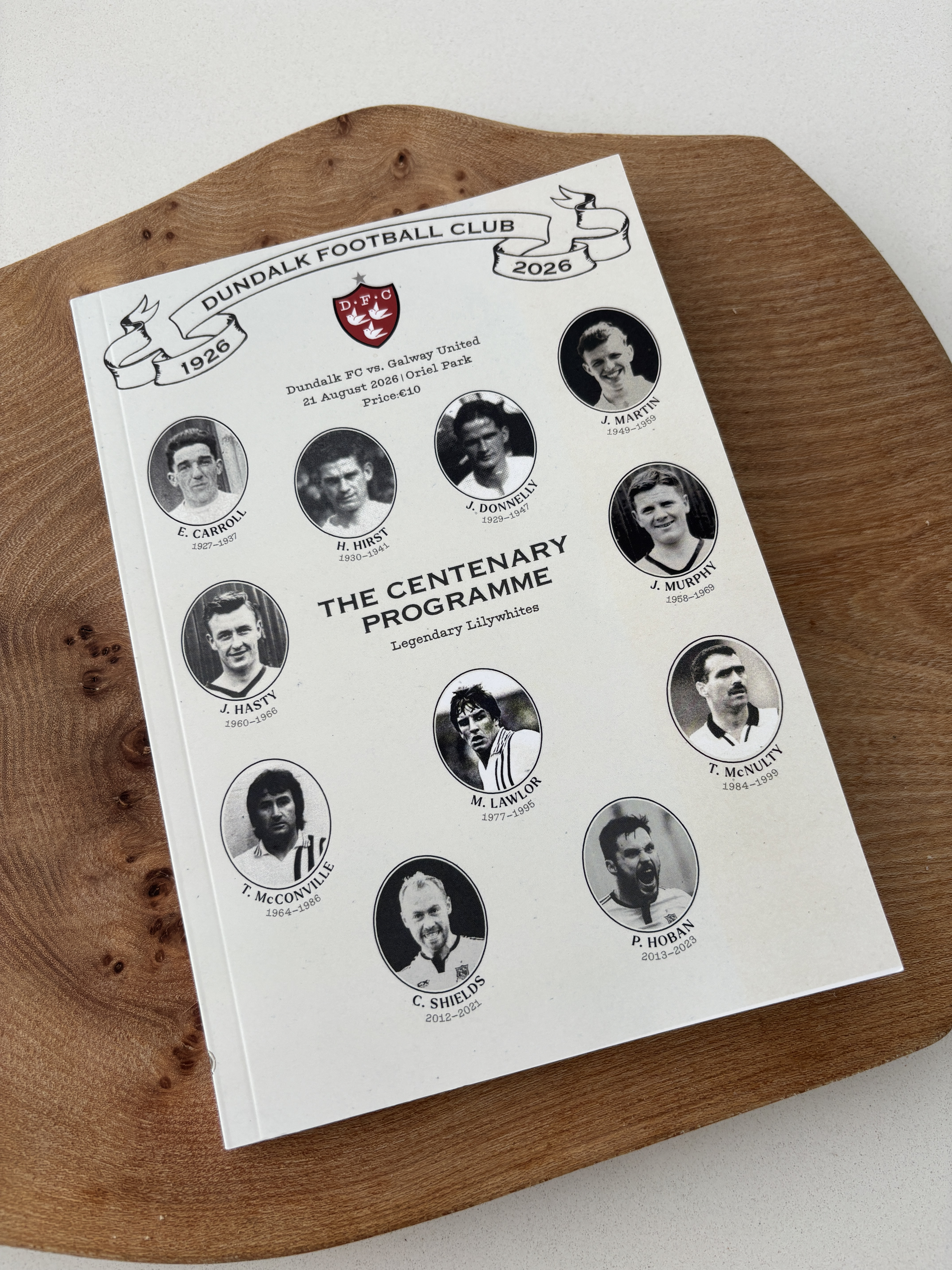
- Chairman: Chris Clinton
- Manager: Ciarán Kilduff
- Stadium: Oriel Park
- League of Ireland Premier Division: 6th of 10
- FAI Cup: Quarter final
- Leinster Senior Cup: Semi-final
- Top goalscorer: League: Daryl Horgan, (12); All: Daryl Horgan, (13)
- Highest home attendance: 3,819 (v. Drogheda United, 20 February 2026)
- Lowest home attendance: 2,073 (v. Waterford, 26 June 2026)
- Biggest win: 5–0 (v. Waterford [H], 13 March 2026)
- Biggest defeat: 0–4 (v. St. Patrick's Athletic [A], 27 February 2026)
Home colours	Away colours

Dundalk entered the 2026 League of Ireland Premier Division season after being promoted as champions from the First Division the previous year. Ciarán Kilduff was the club's first-team manager going into the new term, his second season in charge. US-based businessman Chris Clinton acquired John Temple's shareholding during the close season to become the club's majority shareholder.

2026 was Dundalk's 100th season in the League of Ireland.

== Season summary ==
Vinnie Leonard was bought by Norwich City in February for a reported €400,000 up front and "significant add-ons", which would be the club's record transfer fee received. He remained with the club until the UK transfer window opened in the summer.

Pre-season coincided with the Leinster Senior Cup Round 4 Group Stage. Dundalk were the holders and topped the group with two wins from three. They later defeated Shelbourne in the quarter-final before losing to St. Patrick's Athletic in the semi-final.

The League season began on 6 February 2026. However, Dundalk's opening match (a visit to defending League Champions Shamrock Rovers) was postponed because of a waterlogged pitch, meaning they started the season with an away match to Derry City the following week instead. They ended the first series of matches in fourth position, having lost just one game.

They remained in fourth at the end of the second series and briefly moved into third place in Round 21 in the third series. However, they subsequently suffered a dramatic drop in form after the loss of several key players to transfers and long-term injuries. Eoin Kenny and Gbemi Arubi were transferred to English sides, while Danny Mullen suffered a season-ending injury and defenders Tyreke Wilson, JR Wilson, Harvey Warren, and Mayowa Animasahun all had extended periods on the sidelines. They picked up 10 points from the remaining 15 league matches to finish sixth in the league table, and were defeated by Derry City in the quarter-final of the FAI Cup.

The club celebrated its League of Ireland centenary on 21 August with a home match against Galway United, 100 years to the day after their debut match away to Fordsons. They were defeated 2–1, the same scoreline as the Fordsons match 100 years earlier.

In women's football, Dundalk finished in fifth place in Group 1 of the Women's Development League, and were runners up in the WDL Shield. Sophie Hanlon was the WDL's top scorer for the season with 26 goals.

In the end of season awards, Ciaán Kilduff was short-listed for PFAI Manager of the Year, while Daryl Horgan won 'Men’s Player of the Year', his second time winning the award having also won it in 2016.

=== First-Team Squad (2026) ===
Sources: Note: Substitute appearances in brackets

No.	Nat.	Name	DOB	Pos.	Debut	League		FAI Cup		Leinster Cup		Totals	
No.	Nat.	Name	DOB	Pos.	Debut	Apps	Goals	Apps	Goals	Apps	Goals	Apps	Goals
1	(Republic of Ireland)	Enda Minogue	12 January 2002 (age 24)	GK	2025	29 (1)	0	1	0	1	0	32	0
2	(Republic of Ireland)	Conor O'Keeffe	19 September 1993 (age 33)	DF	2025	4 (1)	0	0	0	1	0	6	0
3	(Northern Ireland)	Bobby Burns	10 July 1999 (age 27)	DF	2026	33 (3)	2	2 (1)	1	1	0	40	3
4	(Republic of Ireland)	Mayowa Animasahun	8 August 2003 (age 23)	DF	2021	20 (3)	0	2	0	1	0	26	0
5	(Republic of Ireland)	Harvey Warren	11 April 2004 (age 22)	DF	2026	11 (8)	0	0	0	2	0	21	0
6	(Republic of Ireland)	Aodh Dervin	21 July 1999 (age 27)	MF	2024	27 (6)	1	3	0	3	0	39	1
7	(Republic of Ireland)	Daryl Horgan	10 August 1992 (age 34)	FW	2014	35	12	1	0	1 (1)	1	38	13
8	(Republic of Ireland)	Harry Groome	9 November 2001 (age 25)	MF	2025	11 (22)	1	2 (1)	1	4	1	40	3
9	(Republic of Ireland)	Gbemi Arubi (Note: player transferred to Burton Albion 18 July 2026)	26 May 2004 (age 22)	FW	2025	19 (4)	8	0	0	1	1	24	9
9	(Republic of Ireland)	Cian Dillon (Note: signed 22 July 2026 ahead of Round 25)	4 April 2006 (age 20)	FW	2026	10 (2)	3	2	2	0	0	14	5
10	(Albania)	Leo Gaxha	27 July 2002 (age 24)	FW	2025	3 (11)	0	2 (1)	2	1 (1)	0	19	2
11	(Republic of Ireland)	Ronan Teahan	31 August 2004 (age 22)	MF	2026	23 (7)	5	1 (1)	0	1	0	33	5
12	(Republic of Ireland)	Luke Mulligan	13 November 2007 (age 19)	MF	2024	1 (1)	0	2	2	3	1	7	3
13	(Scotland)	Peter Cherrie	1 October 1983 (age 43)	GK	2009	1 (1)	0	2	0	2	0	6	0
14	(New Zealand)	Norman Garbett	27 February 2004 (age 22)	MF	2024	0 (1)	0	0	0	2	0	3	0
15	(Republic of Ireland)	Vinnie Leonard (Note: player transferred to Norwich City 1 July 2026)	21 March 2008 (age 18)	DF	2024	2 (1)	0	0	0	0	0	3	0
15	(Republic of Ireland)	Trevor Clarke (Note: signed 2 July 2026 ahead of Round 23)	26 March 1998 (age 28)	DF	2026	11 (2)	1	1 (1)	1	0	0	15	2
16	(Northern Ireland)	Eoin Kenny (Note: player transferred to Portsmouth 6 July 2026)	30 December 2005 (age 20)	FW	2023	19 (3)	5	0	0	2	2	24	7
16	(Republic of Ireland)	Egor Vassenin (Note: signed on loan from Shamrock Rovers 16 July 2026 ahead of Round 25)	24 October 2007 (age 19)	DF	2026	4 (5)	0	2 (1)	0	0	0	12	0
17	(Republic of Ireland)	Shane Tracey	4 April 2006 (age 20)	MF	2025	7 (17)	2	2	2	2	0	28	4
18	(Republic of Ireland)	Keith Buckley	19 June 1992 (age 34)	MF	2026	26 (8)	0	0 (1)	0	0 (1)	0	36	0
19	(Republic of Ireland)	Sean Spaight	25 January 2009 (age 17)	DF	2024	2 (2)	0	2	0	4 (1)	0	11	0
20	(Republic of Ireland)	Sammy Safaei (Note: player on loan at Harland & Wolff Welders F.C. until Round 25)	9 March 2005 (age 21)	GK	2025	0	0	0 (1)	0	0	0	1	0
21	(Scotland)	Danny Mullen	1 March 1995 (age 31)	FW	2026	7 (5)	3	0 (1)	1	2 (1)	1	16	5
22	(Republic of Ireland)	Tyreke Wilson	2 December 1999 (age 26)	DF	2026	24 (4)	4	1	0	0	0	29	4
23	(Republic of Ireland)	Aaron Keogh	10 January 2008 (age 18)	MF	2025	0 (1)	0	0 (2)	1	3	0	6	1
24	(Republic of Ireland)	Rob Cornwall	16 October 1994 (age 32)	DF	2026	16 (4)	1	2	0	0 (1)	0	23	1
25	(Republic of Ireland)	Shay Casey	27 January 2008 (age 18)	MF	2025	0	0	0 (1)	0	3	1	4	1
26	(Republic of Ireland)	Max Ferguson	2 May 2008 (age 18)	FW	2026	0	0	0 (1)	0	1 (2)	0	4	0
27	(Scotland)	Declan McDaid	22 November 1995 (age 31)	FW	2025	13 (21)	4	3	0	1 (1)	2	39	6
29	(Republic of Ireland)	TJ Molloy (Note: player sent on loan to Armagh City 28 July 2026 ahead of Round 26)	4 April 2009 (age 17)	FW	2024	0	0	0	0	3	0	3	0
31	(Republic of Ireland)	John Ross Wilson	13 December 1998 (age 27)	DF	2025	21 (2)	1	0 (1)	0	2	0	26	1
39	(Republic of Ireland)	Conor Kearns	6 May 1998 (age 28)	GK	2026	6	0	0	0	1	0	7	0
44	(England)	Tom Grivosti	15 June 1999 (age 27)	DF	2026	10 (1)	0	0	0	0	0	11	0

== Competitions ==
Win Draw Loss

=== Premier Division ===
6 February 2026 Round 1	Shamrock Rovers	P–P	Dundalk	Tallaght, South Dublin
19:45		Report		Stadium: Tallaght Stadium; Referee: Rob Harvey
Note: match postponed (unplayable pitch)

13 February 2026 Round 2	Derry City	2–2	Dundalk	Derry, Northern Ireland
19:45	P.McClean 49'; Duffy 90' (pen.)	Report	Eoin Kenny 22'; Gbemi Arubi 65'	Stadium: Ryan McBride Brandywell Stadium; Attendance: 4,323; Referee: Declan Toland
Note: fixture reversed because of ongoing work at Oriel Park

20 February 2026 Round 3	Dundalk	1–1	Drogheda United	Dundalk
20:00	Danny Mullen 57'	Report	Keeley 88'	Stadium: Oriel Park; Attendance: 3,819; Referee: Rob Hennessy

24 February 2026 Round 1 (refixed)	Shamrock Rovers	1–1	Dundalk	Tallaght, Dublin
20:00	Lopes 19'	Report	Vinnie Leonard (red card) 76'; Danny Mullen 90'	Stadium: Tallaght Stadium; Attendance: 4,352; Referee: Aaron O'Dowd
Note: refixed from postponement 6 February 2026

27 February 2026 Round 4	St Patrick's Athletic	4–0	Dundalk	Inchicore, Dublin
19:45	Palmer 20'; Hoare 25'; Elbouzedi 48'; Keena 85'	Report		Stadium: Richmond Park; Attendance: 4,427; Referee: Lucas Keating

6 March 2026 Round 5	Galway United	2–2	Dundalk	Galway
19:45	Walsh 51'; Twardek 62'	Report	Gbemi Arubi 12'; Bobby Burns 81'	Stadium: Eamonn Deacy Park; Attendance: 1,933; Referee: Alan Patchell

13 March 2026 Round 6	Dundalk	5–0	Waterford	Dundalk
19:45	Ronan Teahan 30'; Declan McDaid 43'; Daryl Horgan 87'; Eoin Kenny 90', 90'	Report		Stadium: Oriel Park; Attendance: 2,819; Referee: Marc Lynch

16 March 2026 Round 7	Dundalk	1–0	Sligo Rovers	Dundalk
19:45	Daryl Horgan 82' (pen.); Aodh Dervin (red card) 84'	Report		Stadium: Oriel Park; Attendance: 2,343; Referee: Oliver Moran

20 March 2026 Round 8	Bohemians	1–1	Dundalk	Phibsborough, Dublin
20:00	Hickey 20'	Report	Gbemi Arubi 59'	Stadium: Dalymount Park; Attendance: 4,383; Referee: Rob Hennessy

3 April 2026 Round 9	Shelbourne	2–3	Dundalk	Drumcondra, Dublin
19:45	Rossi 59'; Martin 67'	Report	Gbemi Arubi 11'; Bobby Burns 22'; Rossi 86' (o.g.)	Stadium: Tolka Park; Attendance: 4,674; Referee: Lucas Keating

7 April 2026 Round 10	Dundalk	2–0	St Patrick's Athletic	Dundalk
17:00	Tyreke Wilson 7'; Shane Tracey 20'; Daryl Horgan (red card) 80'	Report		Stadium: Oriel Park; Attendance: 3,294; Referee: Aaron O’Dowd

10 April 2026 Round 11	Dundalk	2–2	Derry City	Dundalk
19:45	Tyreke Wilson 35'; Ronan Teahan 80'	Report	Clarke 14'; Akinyemi 45'; James McClean (red card) 95'	Stadium: Oriel Park; Attendance: 2,736; Referee: Paul Norton

17 April 2026 Round 12	Dundalk	2–1	Galway United	Dundalk
19:45	Declan McDaid 81', 85'	Report	Walsh 90'	Stadium: Oriel Park; Attendance: 2,673; Referee: Daryl Carolan

25 April 2026 Round 13	Sligo Rovers	2–0	Dundalk	Sligo
19:45	Fitzgerald 12'; Kavanagh 48'	Report		Stadium: The Showgrounds; Attendance: 2,691; Referee: Declan Toland

1 May 2026 Round 14	Dundalk	1–2	Shelbourne	Dundalk
19:45	Daryl Horgan 89' (pen.)	Report	Kelly 11'; McInroy 52'	Stadium: Oriel Park; Attendance: 3,149; Referee: Paul Norton

4 May 2026 Round 15	Waterford	3–3	Dundalk	Waterford
19:45	Lonergan 40'; Amond 60'; Mahon 88'	Report	Daryl Horgan 14', 83'; Gbemi Arubi 35'	Stadium: Waterford Regional Sports Centre; Attendance: 1,667; Referee: Daniel Murphy

8 May 2026 Round 16	Dundalk	1–3	Bohemians	Dundalk
19:45	Aodh Dervin 34'; Rob Cornwall (red card) 67'	Report	Tierney 50'; James-Taylor 68' (pen.); Myers 90'	Stadium: Oriel Park; Attendance: 3,133; Referee: Aaron O'Dowd

15 May 2026 Round 17	Dundalk	1–0	Shamrock Rovers	Oriel Park
20:00	Tyreke Wilson 78'; John Ross Wilson (red card) 87'	Report		Attendance: 2,961; Referee: Rob Harvey

22 May 2026 Round 18	Drogheda United	1–1	Dundalk	Drogheda
20:00	Burney 57'	Report	Gbemi Arubi 18'	Stadium: Sullivan & Lamb Park; Attendance: 2,547; Referee: Rob Hennessy

29 May 2026 Round 19	Dundalk	2–1	Derry City	Dundalk
19:45	Daryl Horgan 20'; Gbemi Arubi 61'	Report	Dummigan 59'	Stadium: Oriel Park; Attendance: 2,617; Referee: Oliver Moran

12 June 2026 Round 20	Galway United	0–1	Dundalk	Cork
19:45		Report	Tyreke Wilson 90'	Stadium: Turners Cross; Attendance: 454; Referee: Kevin O'Sullivan
Note: Match moved to Turners Cross, Cork, because Galway United's home ground and alternative arrangements were unavailable.

19 June 2026 Round 21	Bohemians	1–2	Dundalk	Phibsborough, Dublin
20:00	Byrne 5'	Report	Danny Mullen 22'; Eoin Kenny 77'; Declan McDaid (red card) 87'	Stadium: Dalymount Park; Referee: Paul McLaughlin

26 June 2026 Round 22	Dundalk	2–3	Waterford	Dundalk
19:45	Eoin Kenny 10'; Harry Groome 29'	Report	Lonergan 45', 64'; Mahon 84'	Stadium: Oriel Park; Attendance: 2,073; Referee: Marc Lynch

3 July 2026 Round 23	Shelbourne	2–1	Dundalk	Drumcondra, Dublin
20:00	Kelly 39'; Wood 41'	Report	JR Wilson 3'	Stadium: Tolka Park; Attendance: 4,032; Referee: Aaron O'Dowd

10 July 2026 Round 24	Dundalk	1–2	Drogheda United	Dundalk
19:45	Gbemi Arubi 29'	Report	Farrell 73', 85'	Stadium: Oriel Park; Attendance: unreported Referee: Rob Harvey

24 July 2026 Round 25	St Patrick's Athletic	1–1	Dundalk	Inchicore, Dublin
19:45	Hoare 57'	Report	Daryl Horgan 35' (pen.)	Stadium: Richmond Park; Attendance: 4,510; Referee: Kevin O’Sullivan

31 July 2026 Round 26	Dundalk	1–1	Sligo Rovers	Dundalk
19:45	Daryl Horgan 52'	Report	McElroy 90'	Stadium: Oriel Park; Attendance: 2,266; Referee: Neil Doyle

7 August 2026 Round 27	Shamrock Rovers	3–2	Dundalk	Tallaght, South Dublin
20:00	Watts 3' (pen.); Noonan 19'; Afolabi 38'	Report	Rob Cornwall 15'; Daryl Horgan 27' (pen.)	Stadium: Tallaght Stadium; Attendance: 5,102; Referee: Rob Harvey

21 August 2026 Round 28	Dundalk	1–2	Galway United	Dundalk
19:45	Trevor Clarke 85'	Report	McCarthy 9'; Twardek 55'	Stadium: Oriel Park; Attendance: 3,152; Referee: Mark Houlihan

28 August 2026 Round 29	Drogheda United	2–3	Dundalk	Drogheda
20:00	Ancelin 32'; Kavanagh 35'	Report	Cian Dillon 25'; Ronan Teahan 67'; Daryl Horgan 89'	Stadium: Sullivan & Lamb Park; Attendance: 2,436; Referee: Neil Doyle

11 September 2026 Round 30	Waterford	1–1	Dundalk	Waterford
19:45	Caan 37'	Report	John Mahon o.g. 21'	Stadium: Waterford Regional Sports Centre; Attendance: unreported Referee: Lucas Keating

15 September 2026 Round 31	Dundalk	0–4	St Patrick's Athletic	Dundalk
19:45		Report	Keena 21', 37'; Sheridan 75'; Edmondson 82'	Stadium: Oriel Park; Attendance: 2,435; Referee: Marc Lynch

18 September 2026 Round 32	Dundalk	2–3	Shelbourne	Dundalk
19:45	Ronan Teahan 12'; Declan McDaid 71'; Shane Tracey (red card) 85'	Report	Moore 39'; Boyd 80', 90'	Stadium: Oriel Park; Attendance: 2,641; Referee: Kevin O’Sullivan

2 October 2026 Round 33	Dundalk	1–2	Bohemians	Dundalk
19:45	Daryl Horgan 88' (pen.)	Report	Whelan 26' (pen.); Tierney 67'; Byrne (red card) 89'	Stadium: Oriel Park; Attendance: 3,154; Referee: Damien MacGraith

17 October 2026 Round 34	Sligo Rovers	1–1	Dundalk	Sligo
19:45	Woolery 12'	Report	Ronan Teahan 90'	Stadium: The Showgrounds; Attendance: unreported Referee: Daniel Murphy

23 October 2026 Round 35	Derry City	2–1	Dundalk	Derry, Northern Ireland
19:45	Clarke 12'; Duffy 71'	Report	Shane Tracey 79'	Stadium: Ryan McBride Brandywell Stadium; Attendance: unreported Referee: Marc Lynch

30 October 2026 Round 36	Dundalk	3–1	Shamrock Rovers	Oriel Park
19:45	Daryl Horgan 57'; Cian Dillon 65', 68'	Report	Rob Cornwall 23' (o.g.)	Attendance: 3,173; Referee: Paul McLaughlin

==== League table ====
Pos	Team	Pld	W	D	L	GF	GA	GD	Pts	Qualification or relegation
4	Shelbourne	36	12	13	11	52	50	+2	49	
5	Derry City	36	11	15	10	50	47	+3	48	Qualification for Europa League first qualifying round (Note: Derry City won the 2026 FAI Cup.)
6	Dundalk	36	11	12	13	55	59	−4	45	
7	Waterford	36	10	13	13	54	61	−7	43	
8	Galway United	36	10	12	14	46	53	−7	42	

Source: League of Ireland
Rules for classification: 1) Points; 2) Goal difference; 3) Goals scored.

=== FAI Cup ===
==== Second round ====
17 July Second round	St Mochta's	1–3	Dundalk	Dundalk, County Louth
19:45	Dean Moran 83'	Report	Shane Tracey 15'; Trevor Clarke 37'; Harry Groome 65'	Stadium: Oriel Park; Attendance: 1,148; Referee: Alan Patchell
Note: St Mochta's were drawn as the home team but the two clubs agreed to switch the venue to Dundalk's Oriel Park home venue.

==== Third round ====
15 August Third round	Dundalk	8–0	Castlebar Celtic	Dundalk, County Louth
17:00	Cian Dillon 7' (pen.), 67'; Bobby Burns 11'; Luke Mulligan 43', 61'; Leo Gaxha 59'; Aaron Keogh 71'; Danny Mullen 80'	Report		Stadium: Oriel Park; Attendance: unreported Referee: Oliver Moran

==== Quarter Final ====
6 September 2026 QF	Derry City	4–2	Dundalk	Derry, Northern Ireland
16:00	P.McClean 23'; Duffy 44' (pen.), 85'; Dos Santos 80'	Report	Shane Tracey 12'; Leo Gaxha 90'	Stadium: Ryan McBride Brandywell Stadium; Attendance: unreported Referee: Paul McLaughlin

=== Leinster Senior Cup ===
==== Round 4 Group A ====
Team	Pld	W	D	L	GF	GA	GD	Pts
Dundalk	3	2	0	1	10	6	4	6
Shelbourne	3	2	0	1	8	6	2	6
St Peter's Athlone	3	1	0	2	7	8	2	3
Athlone Town	3	1	0	2	4	9	–5	3

11 January 2026 Match 1	St Peter's Athlone	5–2	Dundalk	Athlone, County Westmeath
13:00	Jonathan Kiernan 20'; Dylan Gavin 43' (pen.) 67' (pen.); Niall Scullion 57'; Dylan Sumner 81'	Report	Darci Lawless 54' (o.g.); Luke Mulligan 60'; Enda Minogue (red card) 66'	Stadium: McCarthy Park; Attendance: unreported Referee: Declan Toland
Note: U20 squad used for match

13 January 2026 Match 2	Dundalk	3–1	Shelbourne	Dundalk, County Louth
19:45	Danny Mullen 42'; Eoin Kenny 51', 83'	Report	Ring 75'	Stadium: Dundalk Sports Centre; Attendance: unreported Referee: Declan Toland

24 January 2026 Match 3	Athlone Town	0–5	Dundalk	Athlone, County Westmeath
13:00			Gbemi Arubi 21' (pen.); Harry Groome 40'; Declan McDaid 76'; Daryl Horgan 83'; Declan McDaid 84'	Stadium: Athlone Town Stadium; Attendance: unreported Referee: Mark Houlihan

==== Quarter Final ====
14 April 2026 QF	Dundalk	3–1	Shelbourne	Dundalk, County Louth
19:45	Tunde Anunlopo 1'; Ethan Hall 39'; Shay Casey 56'	Report	Moore 88'	Stadium: Oriel Park; Attendance: 500 (est.); Referee: Daryl Carolan
Note: Several U20 squad players used for match

==== Semi Final ====
26 May 2026 SF	Dundalk	0–1	St. Patrick's Athletic	Dundalk, County Louth
19:45		Report	Rooney 42'	Stadium: Oriel Park; Attendance: 500 (est.); Referee: Paul McLaughlin
Note: Several U20 squad players used for match

== Awards ==
=== SWAI Player of the Month ===
Month	Player	Reference
May	(Republic of Ireland) Daryl Horgan	
June	(Northern Ireland) Eoin Kenny	

=== PFAI Player of the Year ===
- Daryl Horgan
