= 2025 Dundalk F.C. season =

Irish football season

Dundalk
2025 season
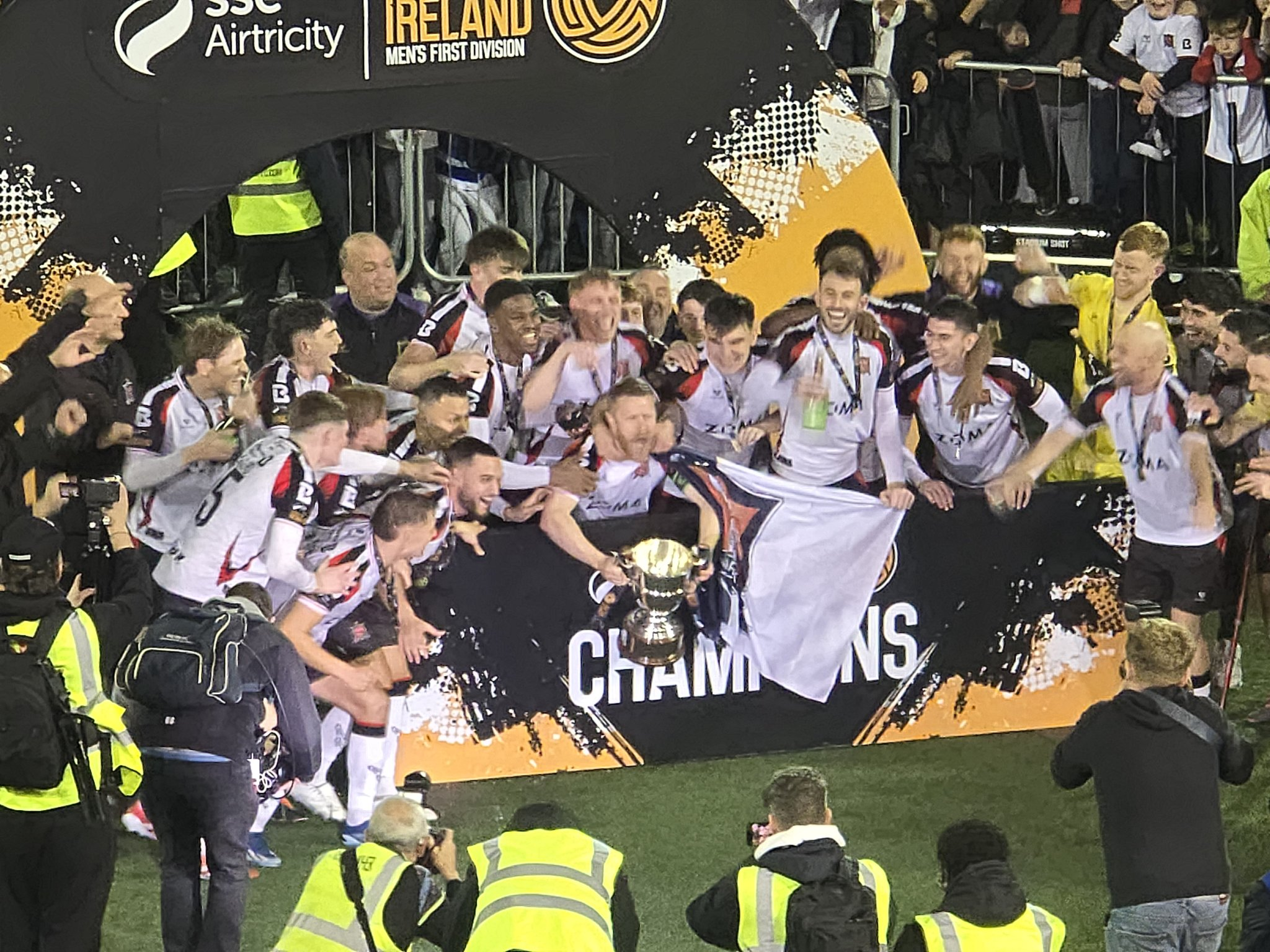
- Dundalk FC 2025 First Division Champions
- Chairman: John Temple
- Head coach: Ciarán Kilduff
- Stadium: Oriel Park
- League of Ireland First Division: 1st (Champions)
- FAI Cup: Second round
- Leinster Senior Cup: Winners
- Top goalscorer: League: Gbemi Arubi (12 goals); All: Daryl Horgan (13 goals)
- Highest home attendance: 3,358 (v Finn Harps, 10 October 2025)
- Biggest win: Treaty United 0–7 Dundalk (22 August 2025)
- Biggest defeat: Bray Wanderers 2–0 Dundalk (11 July 2025)
Home colours	Away colours

Dundalk entered the 2025 League of Ireland First Division season after being relegated from the Premier Division the previous year. Ciarán Kilduff was the club's new first-team manager going into the new term, having been appointed during the close season.

2025 was Dundalk's 99th season in the League of Ireland and their first season in the First Division since winning promotion in 2008.

== Season summary ==
Dundalk were at risk of not receiving a licence to compete in the 2025 season because of the financial crisis that had engulfed the club towards the end of 2024. Following new owner John Temple's efforts to get the debt situation under control, which meant that the club's holding company avoided examinership, the club was belatedly awarded a licence to compete in the First Division.

Their playing season began with the 2024–25 Leinster Senior Cup. Like all Leinster-based League of Ireland teams, they entered at the group stage (Round 3), where they were drawn in Group B with Shamrock Rovers, Malahide United, and Usher Celtic. They topped the group to progress to the Quarter-finals. In the process, TJ Molloy-Murray became the club's youngest goalscorer at 15 years and 10 months, breaking by six months a record set by Peter McParland in 1950. They subsequently reached the final after being given walkovers in both the quarter-final and semi-final. They defeated St. Patrick's Athletic 2–1 in the final at Richmond Park to win the competition for the eighth time.

The First Division league schedule began on 14 February 2025 with a 1–0 home win over Athlone Town. Dundalk led the way from the start, picking up 25 points from 27 in the first series of matches. They remained undefeated in the second series but a return of four wins and five draws allowed the chasing pack to stay in touch. In the third series, they suffered their first defeats of the season but six wins allowed them to maintain a six-point lead going into the final set of matches. They sealed the title with one game to spare with a 3–0 win over Finn Harps in front of 3,358 spectators.

In August, Sean Keogh was transferred to Brighton, in what was reported to be a "club record sale" (therefore in excess of the €175,000 received for Daniel Kearns in 2011).

The League of Ireland teams entered the 2025 FAI Cup in the second round. In that second round, Dundalk were knocked out by Sligo Rovers.

During Brian Ainscough's ownership, he had brought in several minority shareholders including the US-based businessman, Chris Clinton. Clinton had remained as 'Executive Director' during 2025 and he then acquired John Temple's shareholding at the end of the season.

=== First-Team Squad (2025) ===
Sources: Note: Substitute appearances in brackets

No.	Nat.	Name	DOB	Pos.	Debut	League		FAI Cup		Leinster Cup		Totals	
No.	Nat.	Name	DOB	Pos.	Debut	Apps	Goals	Apps	Goals	Apps	Goals	Apps	Goals
1	(Republic of Ireland)	Enda Minogue	12 January 2002 (age 24)	GK	2025	18	0	1	0	0 (2)	0	21	0
2	(Republic of Ireland)	Conor O'Keeffe	19 September 1993 (age 32)	DF	2025	19 (3)	0	0 (1)	0	2 (1)	0	26	0
3	(Republic of Ireland)	Sean Keogh (Note: transferred to Brighton on 1 August 2025)	15 April 2006 (age 20)	DF	2024	20 (1)	2	1	0	2 (1)	0	25	2
4 (Note: player used shirts No. 24 and 45 in Leinster Senior Cup)	(Republic of Ireland)	Mayowa Animasahun	8 August 2003 (age 23)	DF	2021	26	1	0	0	3	0	29	1
5	(Republic of Ireland)	Sean McHale (Note: on season-long loan from St Patrick's Athletic)	28 March 2005 (age 21)	DF	2025	10 (9)	1	1	0	1	0	21	1
6	(Republic of Ireland)	Aodh Dervin	21 July 1999 (age 27)	MF	2024	32 (1)	1	1	0	1 (2)	1	37	2
7	(Republic of Ireland)	Daryl Horgan	10 August 1992 (age 34)	FW	2014	31 (2)	11	1	0	3	2	37	13
8	(Republic of Ireland)	Harry Groome	9 November 2001 (age 24)	MF	2025	29 (4)	3	1	0	2 (2)	1	38	4
9	(Republic of Ireland)	Dean Ebbe	16 July 1994 (age 32)	FW	2025	22 (12)	10	0 (1)	0	2	1	37	11
10	(Albania)	Leo Gaxha	27 July 2002 (age 24)	FW	2025	18	5	0	0	1 (2)	1	21	6
11	(Republic of Ireland)	Gbemi Arubi	26 May 2004 (age 22)	FW	2025	17 (11)	12	1	0	2 (1)	0	32	12
12	(Republic of Ireland)	Luke Mulligan	13 November 2007 (age 18)	MF	2024	7 (10)	1	0	0	2	0	19	1
13	(Republic of Ireland)	Conall Alfred		MF	2025	0 (1)	0	0	0	0	0	1	0
14	(New Zealand)	Norman Garbett	27 February 2004 (age 22)	MF	2024	2 (9)	0	0	0	1	0	12	0
15 (Note: player used shirt No. 22 in Leinster Senior Cup)	(Republic of Ireland)	Vincent Leonard	21 March 2008 (age 18)	MF	2024	33 (1)	4	1	0	1 (1)	0	37	4
16	(Northern Ireland)	Eoin Kenny	30 December 2005 (age 20)	FW	2024	28 (6)	9	0 (1)	0	3 (1)	2	39	11
17	(Republic of Ireland)	Keith Ward	12 October 1990 (age 35)	MF	2011	13 (20)	4	0	0	3	0	36	4
18	(Scotland)	Peter Cherrie	1 October 1983 (age 42)	GK	2009	18	0	0	0	2	0	20	0
19	(Republic of Ireland)	Sean Spaight	25 January 2009 (age 17)	DF	2024	3 (2)	0	0 (1)	0	2	0	8	0
20 (Note: player used shirt No. 30 in Leinster Senior Cup)	(Republic of Ireland)	Sammy Safaei	9 March 2005 (age 21)	GK	2025	0 (1)	0	0	0	2	0	3	0
21	(Republic of Ireland)	Muhammad Haris (Note: player transferred to Wexford 1 July 2025 after Round 21)	2008	MF	2025	0 (3)	0	0	0	0 (1)	0	4	0
22 (Note: player used shirt No. 20 in Leinster Senior Cup)	(Wales)	Ethen Vaughan	5 November 2001 (age 24)	DF	2025	1	0	0	0	2	0	3	0
23 (Note: player used shirt No. 5 in Leinster Senior Cup)	(Republic of Ireland)	Andy Paraschiv	15 February 2007 (age 19)	MF	2025	12 (21)	2	0 (1)	0	4	0	38	2
24 (Note: player used shirt No. 4 in Leinster Senior Cup)	(Republic of Ireland)	T.J. Molloy-Murray	4 April 2009 (age 17)	FW	2024	0 (4)	0	0	0	1 (1)	1	6	1
25 (Note: player used shirt No. 22 in Leinster Senior Cup)	(Dominican Republic)	Aidan Russell Vargas	12 May 2006 (age 20)	MF	2025	0	0	0	0	0 (1)	1	1	1
26	(Republic of Ireland)	Shane Tracey	4 April 2006 (age 20)	MF	2025	10 (12)	0	1	0	0	0	23	0
27	(Scotland)	Declan McDaid (Note: player signed 1 July 2025 ahead of Round 22)	22 November 1995 (age 30)	FW	2025	11 (3)	2	1	0	0	0	15	2
28	(Northern Ireland)	Calum Woods		DF	2025	0 (1)	0	0	0	0	0	1	0
28	(Republic of Ireland)	Ronan Murray	12 September 1991 (age 34)	FW	2018	0	0	0	0	0 (1)	0	1	0
29	(England)	Rohan Vaughan (Note: player signed on loan from QPR ahead of Round 24)	3 October 2005 (age 20)	FW	2025	2 (8)	4	0	0	1	1	11	5
30	(Republic of Ireland)	Shay Casey	27 January 2008 (age 18)	MF	2025	0 (1)	0	0	0	0	0	1	0
31	(Republic of Ireland)	John Ross Wilson (Note: signed 14 June 2025 ahead of Round 22)	13 December 1998 (age 27)	DF	2025	14	0	1	0	0	0	15	0
32 (Note: player used shirt No. 25 in Leinster Senior Cup)	(Republic of Ireland)	Rhys O'Hare		DF	2025	0	0	0	0	1	0	1	0
33 (Note: player used shirt No. 4 in Leinster Senior Cup)	(Republic of Ireland)	Tom McLoughlin		MF	2025	0	0	0	0	0 (1)	0	1	0

== Competitions ==
Win Draw Loss

=== First Division ===
14 February 2025 Round 1	Dundalk	1–0	Athlone Town	Dundalk
19:45	Vinnie Leonard 37'	Report		Stadium: Oriel Park; Attendance: 2,600 (est.); Referee: Marc Lynch

21 February 2025 Round 2	Finn Harps	0–1	Dundalk	Ballybofey, County Donegal
19:45		Report	Sean Keogh 2'	Stadium: Finn Park; Attendance: 1,420; Referee: Declan Toland

28 February 2025 Round 3	Kerry	0–1	Dundalk	Tralee, County Kerry
19:45		Report	Dean Ebbe 25'; Leo Gaxha (red card) 36'	Stadium: Mounthawk Park; Attendance: 1,195; Referee: Glen Geraghty

8 March 2025 Round 4	Dundalk	2–2	Treaty United	Dundalk
19:45	Dean Ebbe 27'; Aodh Dervin 80'	Report	Martin 85'; Devitt 90'	Stadium: Oriel Park; Attendance: 2,264; Referee: Darragh White

14 March 2025 Round 5	Bray Wanderers	1–3	Dundalk	Bray, County Wicklow
19:45	Murphy 90' pen.	Report	Daryl Horgan 8'; Dean Ebbe 11'; Eoin Kenny 31'	Stadium: Carlisle Grounds; Attendance: 1,650; Referee: Kevin O’Sullivan

21 March 2025 Round 6	Dundalk	2–1	Longford Town	Dundalk
19:45	Dean Ebbe 29' pen. Eoin Kenny 79'	Report	Murtagh 19'	Stadium: Oriel Park; Attendance: 2,030; Referee: Ryan Maher

28 March 2025 Round 7	Dundalk	3–0	Wexford	Dundalk
19:45	Leo Gaxha 66', 78'; Sean Keogh 70'	Report		Stadium: Oriel Park; Attendance: 1,926; Referee: Declan Toland

4 April 2025 Round 8	UCD	0–1	Dundalk	Belfield, Dublin
19:45		Report	Leo Gaxha 63'	Stadium: UCD Bowl; Attendance: 657; Referee: Alan Franklin

11 April 2025 Round 9	Dundalk	1–0	Cobh Ramblers	Dundalk
19:45	Jonas Häkkinen 57' o.g.	Report		Stadium: Oriel Park; Attendance: 1,834; Referee: Aaron O’Dowd

18 April 2025 Round 10	Treaty United	1–1	Dundalk	Garryowen, Limerick
19:45	Mahdy 78'		Daryl Horgan 69'	Stadium: Markets Field; Attendance: 1,283; Referee: Eoghan O'Shea

21 April 2025 Round 11	Dundalk	1–1	Finn Harps	Dundalk
17:00	Vinnie Leonard 81'	Report	McLaughlin 90'	Stadium: Oriel Park; Attendance: 1,761; Referee: Gavin Colfer

26 April 2025 Round 12	Longford Town	0–3	Dundalk	Longford
19:30		Report	Dean Ebbe 55', 63'; Andy Paraschiv 88'	Stadium: Bishopsgate; Attendance: 823; Referee: Mark Houlihan

2 May 2025 Round 13	Athlone Town	0–0	Dundalk	Athlone, County Westmeath
19:45		Report		Stadium: Athlone Town Stadium; Attendance: 684; Referee: Lucas Keating

12 May 2025 Round 14	Dundalk	2–2	Bray Wanderers	Dundalk
19:45	Sean McHale 19'; Gbemi Arubi 90'	Report	Cantwell 31'; Doyle (red card) 68'; Warren 89'	Stadium: Oriel Park; Attendance: 1,874; Referee: Daniel Murphy

16 May 2025 Round 15	Cobh Ramblers	1–2	Dundalk	Cobh, County Cork
19:45	Griffin 54'	Report	Daryl Horgan 37'; Gbemi Arubi 45'	Stadium: St Colman's Park; Attendance: 1,356; Referee: Darragh White

23 May 2025 Round 16	Dundalk	2–0	Kerry	Dundalk
19:45	Leo Gaxha 43'; Daryl Horgan 68'	Report		Stadium: Oriel Park; Attendance: 1,586; Referee: Lucas Keating

30 May 2025 Round 17	Wexford	2–3	Dundalk	Crossabeg, County Wexford
19:45	Levingston 16'; Rowe 42'		Leo Gaxha 13'; Dean Ebbe 78'; Luke Mulligan 87'	Stadium: Ferrycarrig Park; Referee: Glen Geraghty

13 June 2025 Round 18	Dundalk	1–1	UCD	Dundalk
19:45	Harry Groome 26'	Report	Adam Verdon 34'	Stadium: Oriel Park; Attendance: 1,587; Referee: Aaron O'Dowd

20 June 2025 Round 19	Dundalk	1–1	Treaty United	Dundalk
19:45	Harry Groome 86'	Report	Walsh 90'	Stadium: Oriel Park; Attendance: 1,428; Referee: Lucas Keating

23 June 2025 Round 20	Finn Harps	1–0	Dundalk	Ballybofey, County Donegal
19:45	Lomboto 61' pen.	Report		Stadium: Finn Park; Referee: Daniel Murphy

27 June 2025 Round 21	Dundalk	1–0	Cobh Ramblers	Dundalk
19:45	Gbemi Arubi 13'	Report	Coleman (red card) 90'	Stadium: Oriel Park; Attendance: 1,487; Referee: Oliver Moran

4 July 2025 Round 22	Kerry	0–4	Dundalk	Tralee, County Kerry
19:45		Report	Harry Groome 20'; Eoin Kenny 60'; Keith Ward 90'; Andy Paraschiv 90'	Stadium: Mounthawk Park; Attendance: 960; Referee: Lucas Keating

11 July 2025 Round 23	Bray Wanderers	2–0	Dundalk	Bray, County Wicklow
19:45	Murphy 43' (pen.); Bishop 90'	Report		Stadium: Carlisle Grounds; Attendance: 1,712; Referee: Declan Toland

25 July 2025 Round 24	Dundalk	3–2	Wexford	Dundalk
19:45	Gbemi Arubi 3', 30'; Keith Ward 63'	Report	Haris 50'; Mikie Rowe 87'	Stadium: Oriel Park; Attendance: 1,632; Referee: Kevin O’Sullivan

1 August 2025 Round 25	UCD	0–1	Dundalk	Belfield, Dublin
19:45		Report	Daryl Horgan 45' (pen.)	Stadium: UCD Bowl; Attendance: 579; Referee: Mark Houlihan

5 August 2025 Round 26	Dundalk	4–1	Longford Town	Dundalk
17:00	Eoin Kenny 15'; Dean Ebbe 34', 61'; Declan McDaid 85'	Report	Hand 79'	Stadium: Oriel Park; Attendance: 1,328; Referee: Darragh White

8 August 2025 Round 27	Dundalk	6–1	Athlone Town	Dundalk
19:45	Gbemi Arubi 11'; Eoin Kenny 28', 59'; Rohan Vaughan 81', 90'; Keith Ward 90'	Report	Oyenuga 9'	Stadium: Oriel Park; Attendance: 1,611; Referee: John Sconnie Walsh

22 August 2025 Round 28	Treaty United	0–7	Dundalk	Garryowen, Limerick
19:45		Report	Daryl Horgan 10', 20', 83' (pen.); Gbemi Arubi 31'; O'Connor 39' (o.g.); Vinnie Leonard 65'; Rohan Vaughan 77'	Stadium: Markets Field; Attendance: unreported Referee: Daniel Murphy

29 August 2025 Round 29	Dundalk	3–3	Kerry	Dundalk
19:45	Daryl Horgan 41' (pen.), 47'; Keith Ward 53'	Report	Teahan 22', 47'; Cleary 42'	Stadium: Oriel Park; Attendance: 1,644; Referee: Lucas Keating

6 September 2025 Round 30	Wexford	0–0	Dundalk	Crossabeg, County Wexford
19:45		Report		Stadium: Ferrycarrig Park; Attendance: 1,000 (est); Referee: Declan Toland

12 September 2025 Round 31	Dundalk	3–1	Bray Wanderers	Dundalk
19:45	Gbemi Arubi 9', 34'; Eoin Kenny 54'		Warren 81'	Stadium: Oriel Park; Attendance: 1,961; Referee: Aaron Dowd

20 September 2025 Round 32	Longford Town	3–2	Dundalk	Longford
19:30	O'Brien 23'; Doran 51'; Murtagh (red card) 67'; George 71'	Report	Eoin Kenny 26'; Mayowa Animasahun 90'	Stadium: Bishopsgate; Attendance: 563; Referee: Glen Geraghty

26 September 2025 Round 33	Dundalk	3–2	UCD	Dundalk
19:45	Gbemi Arubi 26' (pen.), 64' (pen.); Eoin Kenny 72'	Report	Dignam 21'; Doyle 75'	Stadium: Oriel Park; Attendance: 1,607; Referee: Lucas Keating

3 October 2025 Round 34	Athlone Town	1–1	Dundalk	Athlone, County Westmeath
19:45	Connolly 72'	Report	Declan McDaid 7'	Stadium: Athlone Town Stadium; Attendance: 1,432; Referee: Ryan Maher

10 October 2025 Round 35	Dundalk	3–0	Finn Harps	Dundalk
19:45	Gbemi Arubi 54'; Daryl Horgan 59' (pen.); Vinnie Leonard 90'			Stadium: Oriel Park; Attendance: 3,358

17 October 2025 Round 36	Cobh Ramblers	1–2	Dundalk	Cobh, County Cork
19:45	Whelan 80'	Report	Dean Ebbe 36'; Rohan Vaughan 87'	Stadium: St Colman's Park; Attendance: unreported Referee: Aaron O'Dowd

==== League table ====
Pos	Team	Pld	W	D	L	GF	GA	GD	Pts	Promotion or qualification
1	Dundalk (C, P)	36	23	10	3	74	31	+43	79	Promotion to 2026 League of Ireland Premier Division
2	Cobh Ramblers	36	21	6	9	70	38	+32	69	Qualification for First Division play-offs
3	Bray Wanderers	36	20	2	14	63	53	+10	62	Qualification for First Division play-offs
4	UCD	36	17	8	11	50	40	+10	59	Qualification for First Division play-offs
5	Treaty United	36	13	9	14	51	48	+3	48	Qualification for First Division play-offs
6	Longford Town	36	12	9	15	43	59	−16	45	
7	Wexford	36	12	8	16	42	51	−9	44	
8	Finn Harps	35	8	12	15	42	55	−13	36	
9	Kerry	35	8	9	18	38	58	−20	33	
10	Athlone Town	36	3	11	22	29	69	−40	20	

Source: SSE Airtricity League of Ireland First Division
Rules for classification: 1) Points; 2) Goal difference; 3) Goals scored
(C) Champions; (P) Promoted

=== FAI Cup ===
18 July 2025 Second round (Note: League of Ireland clubs entered the competition in the Second round)	Dundalk	0–2	Sligo Rovers	Dundalk, County Louth
19:45		Report	James McManus 51'; Jake Doyle-Hayes 54'	Stadium: Oriel Park; Attendance: 2,038; Referee: Aaron O’Dowd

=== Leinster Senior Cup ===
==== Third Round Group B ====
Team	Pld	W	D	L	GF	GA	GD	Pts
Dundalk	3	2	0	1	9	2	7	6
Usher Celtic	3	2	0	1	8	5	3	6
Shamrock Rovers	3	2	0	1	7	6	1	6
Malahide United	3	0	0	3	2	13	–11	0

17 January 2025 Matchday 1	Dundalk	4–0	Malahide United	Dundalk, County Louth
19:45	Daryl Horgan 11'; Dean Ebbe 38'; Aodh Dervin 52'; Aidan Russell Vargas 90+1'	Report		Stadium: Oriel Park; Attendance: 1,219; Referee: David Dunne

20 January 2025 Matchday 2	Dundalk	1–2	Usher Celtic	Dundalk, County Louth
19:45	Eoin Kenny 62'	Report	Graham Curran 70' (pen.); Gary Gannon 90'	Stadium: Oriel Park; Attendance: 1,021; Referee: Mark Moynihan

7 February 2025 Matchday 3	Shamrock Rovers	0–4	Dundalk	Citywest, Dublin 24
20:00		Report	TJ Molloy 13'; Eoin Kenny 16'; Daryl Horgan 29'; Leo Gaxha 53'	Stadium: Roadstone Academy; Attendance: unreported Referee: Neil Doyle

==== Quarter Final ====
25 March 2025 Quarter Final	Dundalk	w/o¹	North End United	Dundalk, County Louth
19:45				Stadium: Oriel Park
Note: ¹North End United could not field a team and Dundalk were awarded a walkover

==== Semi Final ====
2 September 2025 Semi Final	Dundalk	w/o¹	Bohemians	Dundalk, County Louth
19:45				Stadium: Oriel Park
Note: ¹Bohemians could not agree a date for the fixture to take place and Dundalk were awarded a walkover

==== Final ====
26 October 2025 Final	St. Patrick's Athletic	1–2	Dundalk	Inchicore, Dublin 8
18:00	Keena 26'; Garrick (red card) 58'	Report	Harry Groome 2'; Rohan Vaughan 9'	Stadium: Richmond Park; Attendance: 400 (est.); Referee: Oliver Moran

== Awards ==
Award	Person	Reference
PFAI First Division Manager of the Year	(Republic of Ireland) Ciarán Kilduff	
