= Gaxha =

Gaxha is a surname. Notable people with the surname include:

- Adrian Gaxha (born 1984), Albanian singer and songwriter
- Leo Gaxha (born 2002), Albanian and Irish football forward
