= Mayowa Animasahun =

Irish footballer (born 2003)

Personal information
- Full name: Mayowa Animasahun
- Date of birth: 8 August 2003 (age 23)
- Place of birth: Dundalk, County Louth, Ireland
- Height: 1.95 m (6 ft 5 in)
- Position: Defender

Team information
- Current team: Dundalk
- Number: 4

Youth career
- –2017: Glenmuir United
- 2018: St Kevin's Boys
- 2018–2020: Bohemians
- 2021: Dundalk

Senior career*
| Years | Team | Apps | (Gls) |
| 2021– | Dundalk | 74 | (1) |
| 2022–2023 | → Dungannon Swifts (loan) | 29 | (2) |
- * Club domestic league appearances and goals as of 16:47, 10 November 2026 (UTC)

Mayowa Animasahun (born 8 August 2003) is an Irish professional footballer who plays as a defender for League of Ireland Premier Division club Dundalk.

== Club career ==
=== Youth career ===
A native of Dundalk, County Louth, Animasahun began playing football with local club Glenmuir United, where he earned a move top Dublin academy club St Kevin's Boys, then moved to the academy of League of Ireland side Bohemians after a few months and remained there for 3 years until he returned to his hometown club Dundalk in early 2021. While with Glenmuir, he represented the Dundalk Schoolboys League's representative side at the Kennedy Cup alongside future senior teammate Ryan O'Kane.

=== Dundalk ===
On 10 August 2021, Animasahun signed his first professional contract with Dundalk. On 27 August 2021, he made his senior debut for the club, coming off the bench in a 5–1 win over St Mochta's in the FAI Cup. Animasahun made his League of Ireland Premier Division debut for the club on 3 September 2021, replacing Sean Murray from the bench in the 84th minute of a 1–1 draw away to Waterford. On 21 September 2021, he made his first start for the club in the FAI Cup Quarter Final in a 3–1 win over Finn Harps After extra time at Oriel Park.

==== Dungannon Swifts loan ====
Struggling for game time at Dundalk in the 2022 season, Animasahun signed for NIFL Premiership club Dungannon Swifts on a season long loan deal in August 2022. He made 35 appearances in all competitions during his loan spell, scoring 3 goals before returning to Dundalk in June 2023.

==== Return from loan ====
Having gained first team experience while out on loan, Animasahun saw a big increase in his playing time in the 2024 season, making 21 appearances in all competitions as Dundalk were relegated to the League of Ireland First Division by finishing bottom of the league among financial uncertainty at the club. Despite the relegation, his performances drew interest from FAI Cup winners Drogheda United. On 20 December 2024, he signed a new contract at Dundalk. He suffered a hamstring injury in August 2025 during the club's title run in, but managed to return quickly, only missing 3 games in the process. On 20 September 2025, he captained the club for the first time and also scored his first senior goal for the club, in a 3–2 defeat away to Longford Town. On 10 October 2025, he played in a 3–0 win over Finn Harps at Oriel Park to help his side secure the 2025 League of Ireland First Division title and promotion back to the Premier Division. On 17 December 2025, Animasahun signed a new contract with the club.

== Career statistics ==
As of match played on 17 October 2026

Appearances and goals by club, season and competition
| Club | Division | Season | League | | National Cup (Note: Includes FAI Cup & Irish Cup) | | League Cup (Note: Includes Northern Ireland Football League Cup) | | Europe | | Other | | Total | |
| Club | Division | Season | Apps | Goals | Apps | Goals | Apps | Goals | Apps | Goals | Apps | Goals | Apps | Goals |
|---|---|---|---|---|---|---|---|---|---|---|---|---|---|---|
| Dundalk | 2021 | LOI Premier Division | 6 | 0 | 3 | 0 | – | | 0 (Note: Appearance(s) in the UEFA Europa Conference League) | 0 | 0 (Note: Appearance in the President of Ireland's Cup) | 0 | 9 | 0 |
| Dundalk | 2022 | LOI Premier Division | 0 | 0 | 0 | 0 | – | | – | | – | | 0 | 0 |
| Dundalk | 2023 | LOI Premier Division | 0 | 0 | 0 | 0 | – | | 0 | 0 | – | | 0 | 0 |
| Dundalk | 2024 | LOI Premier Division | 19 | 0 | 1 | 0 | – | | – | | 1 (Note: Appearance(s) in the Leinster Senior Cup) | 0 | 21 | 0 |
| Dundalk | 2025 | LOI First Division | 26 | 1 | 0 | 0 | – | | – | | 3 | 0 | 29 | 1 |
| Dundalk | 2026 | LOI Premier Division | 23 | 0 | 2 | 0 | – | | – | | 1 | 0 | 26 | 0 |
| Dundalk | Total | | 74 | 1 | 6 | 0 | – | | 0 | 0 | 5 | 0 | 85 | 1 |
| Dungannon Swifts (loan) | 2022–23 | NIFL Premiership | 29 | 2 | 2 | 0 | 3 | 0 | – | | 1 (Note: Appearance in the 2023 NIFL Premiership Promotion/Relegation Playoff) | 1 | 35 | 3 |
| Career total | | | 103 | 3 | 8 | 0 | 3 | 0 | 0 | 0 | 6 | 1 | 120 | 4 |

== Honours ==
Dundalk

- League of Ireland First Division: 2025
- Leinster Senior Cup: 2024–25
- President of Ireland's Cup: 2021
