= Ronan Teahan =

Irish footballer (born 2004)

Personal information
- Date of birth: 31 August 2004 (age 22)
- Place of birth: Cahersiveen, County Kerry, Ireland
- Height: 1.75 m (5 ft 9 in)
- Position: Midfielder

Team information
- Current team: Dundalk
- Number: 11

Youth career
- –2019: Iveragh United
- 2019–2022: Kerry

Senior career*
Years	Team	Apps	(Gls)
2023–2025	Kerry	94	(4)
2026–	Dundalk	30	(5)
- * Club domestic league appearances and goals as of 16:53, 10 November 2026 (UTC)

Ronan Teahan (born 31 August 2004) is an Irish professional footballer who plays as a midfielder for League of Ireland Premier Division club Dundalk. He previously played for Kerry.

== Club career ==
=== Youth career ===
A native of Cahersiveen, County Kerry, Teahan began playing football with his local club Iveragh United, before moving to the academy of League of Ireland First Division club Kerry, where he progressed through their U15, U17 and U19 teams before breaking into the first team squad.

=== Kerry ===
Having come through the club's academy, Teahan was part of Kerry's first ever senior squad and featured in their inaugural game, a 2–0 loss to Cobh Ramblers on 17 February 2023. He made a total of 35 appearances in all competitions during his first season in senior football. In August 2023, he signed a new contract with the club until the end of the 2025 season. On 4 March 2024, he scored his first goal in senior football in a 4–1 win over Treaty United in the Semi-final of the Munster Senior Cup, helping the club to their first ever final. On 1 August 2025, he scored his first league goal for the club, in a 4–0 victory at home to Athlone Town. He scored 4 goals in 35 appearances in his final season with the club in 2025 as they reached the 2025 FAI Cup Semi-final, with his performances drawing interest from Dundalk, Sligo Rovers and Galway United.

=== Dundalk ===
On 2 December 2025, it was announced that Teahan had signed signed for newly promoted League of Ireland Premier Division club Dundalk ahead of the 2026 season. On 13 March 2026, Teahan scored his first goal for the club, opening the scoring with a header from a Daryl Horgan cross in a 5–0 win over Waterford at Oriel Park.

== Personal life ==
Teahan comes from a family of strong sporting prowess, his father John and sister Muireann both played basketball internationally for Ireland, while his mother Maria won several All-stars and All-Ireland medals with Kerry GAA, his uncle Maurice Fitzgerald is a Kerry GAA legend, another uncle Colm O'Neill represented Cork GAA and he is also cousins with Shane O'Neill, Mark O'Neill and Eric O'Neill who have all also played football professionally, as well as Darragh O’Neill who was a punter in American football for the Colorado Buffaloes.

== Career statistics ==
As of match played on 30 October 2026

Appearances and goals by club, season and competition
Club	Division	Season	League		National Cup (Note: Includes FAI Cup)		Other		Total	
Club	Division	Season	Apps	Goals	Apps	Goals	Apps	Goals	Apps	Goals
Kerry	2023	LOI First Division	33	0	2	0	–		35	0
Kerry	2024	LOI First Division	31	0	2	0	4 (Note: Appearance(s) in the Munster Senior Cup)	1	37	1
Kerry	2025	LOI First Division	30	4	4	0	1	0	35	4
Kerry	Total		94	4	8	0	5	1	107	5
Dundalk	2026	LOI Premier Division	30	5	2	0	1 (Note: Appearance(s) in the Leinster Senior Cup)	0	33	5
Career total			124	9	10	0	6	1	136	10
