= Gbemi Arubi =

Irish footballer (born 2004)

Personal information
- Full name: Gbemi Kingslyn Arubi
- Date of birth: 26 May 2004 (age 22)
- Place of birth: Dublin, Ireland
- Height: 1.83 m (6 ft 0 in)
- Position: Forward

Team information
- Current team: Burton Albion
- Number: 9

Youth career
- –: Dunshaughlin Youths
- –2019: Cherry Orchard
- 2019–2023: Shelbourne

Senior career*
Years	Team	Apps	(Gls)
2022–2023	Shelbourne	8	(0)
2024	Waterford	13	(0)
2025–2026	Dundalk	51	(19)
2026–	Burton Albion	5	(1)

International career^{‡}
2022	Republic of Ireland U19	2	(0)
2026	Republic of Ireland U21	2	(0)
- * Club domestic league appearances and goals as of 21:56, 17 October 2026 (UTC) ‡ National team caps and goals as of 00:00, 18 November 2026 (UTC)

Gbemi Kingslyn Arubi (born 26 May 2004) is an Irish professional footballer who plays as a forward for EFL League One club Burton Albion.

== Club career ==
=== Youth career ===
Arubi began playing with Dublin academy side Cherry Orchard before joining with academy of League of Ireland club Shelbourne in 2019, playing for their under-15 side initially, before playing for the under-17s in 2020 and their under-19s from 2021 to 2023.

=== Shelbourne ===
Arubi was an unused substitute for the Shelbourne first team in 2022, before making his debut on 24 March 2023, scoring in a 4–0 win away to Dundalk. He made his League of Ireland Premier Division debut on 13 May 2023, replacing Jack Moylan from the bench in a 3–0 win away to Sligo Rovers at The Showgrounds. He scored 2 goals in 11 appearances in all competitions before departing the club at the end of the 2023 season.

=== Waterford ===
On 5 January 2024, Arubi signed for newly promoted League of Ireland Premier Division club Waterford. On 2 February 2024, he scored his first goal for the club in a 2–0 win over Wilton United in the Munster Senior Cup. On 19 July 2024, he scored in a 2–1 FAI Cup victory over Cockhill Celtic at the RSC. On 12 November 2024, he was released by the club, having scored 2 goals in 11 appearances during the season.

=== Dundalk ===
On 8 December 2024, Arubi signed for recently relegated League of Ireland First Division club Dundalk. On 9 May 2025, he came off the bench to score a 92nd-minute equaliser in a 2–2 draw against Bray Wanderers at Oriel Park, his first goal for the club. A week later he was rewarded with his first league start for the club and scored the winner in a 2–1 victory away to title rivals Cobh Ramblers. On 10 October 2025, he scored his 12th goal of the season in a 3–0 win over Finn Harps at Oriel Park to help his side secure the 2025 League of Ireland First Division title and promotion back to the Premier Division. On 26 October 2025, he was part of the team that won the 2024–25 Leinster Senior Cup by defeating St Patrick's Athletic 2–1 in the final at Richmond Park. On 15 December 2025, he signed a new contract with the club.

=== Burton Albion ===
On 18 July 2026, Arubi signed for EFL League One club Burton Albion on an initial three-year deal for an undisclosed fee. 4 days after signing he sustained an injury in a pre-season friendly with Birmingham City which would keep him out of action for months. He eventually returned from injury to make his competitive debut for the club on 10 October 2026 in a 1–0 defeat to Doncaster Rovers, while he didn't have to wait long for his first goal for the club which came a week later on his second appearance when he scored a spectacular effort the halfway line in a 2–2 draw away to Peterborough United.

== International career ==
Arubi made his international debut for the Republic of Ireland U19 team on 1 May 2022, replacing Jad Hakiki from the bench in the 70th minute of a 3–0 friendly win over Iceland U19. In May 2026, he drew reported interest from the Nigeria Football Association in representing the nation of his parents' birth, with Arubi stating "I have to keep my options open" regarding his international future. On 6 June 2026, Arubi made his Republic of Ireland U21 debut, in a 2–2 draw away to Croatia U21.

== Career statistics ==
As of match played on 17 October 2026

Appearances and goals by club, season and competition
Club	Season	League			National cup (Note: Includes FAI Cup and FA Cup)		League cup (Note: Includes EFL Cup)		Other		Total	
Club	Season	Division	Apps	Goals	Apps	Goals	Apps	Goals	Apps	Goals	Apps	Goals
Shelbourne	2022	LOI Premier Division	0	0	0	0	–		–		0	0
Shelbourne	2023	LOI Premier Division	8	0	0	0	–		3 (Note: Appearance(s) in the Leinster Senior Cup)	2	11	2
Shelbourne	Total		8	0	0	0	–		3	2	11	2
Waterford	2024	LOI Premier Division	13	0	1	1	–		3 (Note: Appearance(s) in the Munster Senior Cup)	1	17	2
Dundalk	2025	LOI First Division	28	12	1	0	–		3	0	32	12
Dundalk	2026	LOI Premier Division	23	7	0	0	–		2	1	25	8
Dundalk	Total		51	19	1	0	–		5	1	57	20
Burton Albion	2026–27	EFL League One	2	1	0	0	0	0	0	0	2	1
Career total			74	20	2	1	0	0	11	4	87	25

== Honours ==
Dundalk

- League of Ireland First Division: 2025
- Leinster Senior Cup: 2024–25
