= Eoin Kenny =

Northern Irish footballer (born 2005)

Personal information
- Full name: Eoin Richard Kenny
- Date of birth: 30 December 2005 (age 20)
- Place of birth: Derry, Northern Ireland
- Height: 1.78 m (5 ft 10 in)
- Positions: Right midfielder; forward

Team information
- Current team: Portsmouth
- Number: 32

Youth career
- Foyle Harps
- –2020: Rock Celtic
- 2020–2023: Dundalk

Senior career*
Years	Team	Apps	(Gls)
2023–2026	Dundalk	81	(17)
2023	→ Wexford (loan)	10	(1)
2026–	Portsmouth	1	(0)

International career^{‡}
2022	Northern Ireland U18	2	(0)
2023	Republic of Ireland U19	2	(0)
2025–2026	Northern Ireland U21	11	(1)
- * Club domestic league appearances and goals as of 12:37, 22 October 2026 (UTC) ‡ National team caps and goals as of 01:12, 28 October 2026 (UTC)

Eoin Richard Kenny (born 30 December 2005) is an Northern Irish professional footballer who plays as a right midfielder for EFL Championship club Portsmouth.

== Career ==
=== Youth career ===
Kenny was born in Derry, while his family were living nearby in County Donegal while his father Stephen was managing Derry City. He began playing football with local side Foyle Harps before he and his family moved to live in Dundalk while his father was managing Dundalk FC, which is how he signed for local club Rock Celtic, playing in the prestigious Kennedy Cup tournament with the Dundalk Schoolboys side and ultimately being signed by the academy of Dundalk in 2020.

=== Dundalk ===
On 7 March 2023, Kenny signed his first professional contract with Dundalk. On 28 March 2023, he made his senior debut for the club, in a 4–0 loss to Shelbourne at Oriel Park in a Leinster Senior Cup tie.

==== Wexford loan ====
On 7 July 2023, Kenny signed for League of Ireland First Division club Wexford on loan until the end of the season. He made his debut for the club the same day, in a 4–1 loss to Athlone Town at Ferrycarrig Park. He scored in his second and third games for the club, in 3–0 wins away to Bray Wanderers in the league and at home to Avondale United in the FAI Cup.

==== Return from loan ====
After returning from his loan spell, he scored his first goal for the club on 2 February 2024, in a 2–1 loss at home to Drogheda United in the Leinster Senior Cup. He made his league debut for the club on 15 April 2024, replacing Robbie Benson as a late substitute in a 1–0 defeat against Bohemians. On 5 September 2024, he scored his first league goal for the club, opening the scoring after just 79 seconds at home to his father Stephen Kenny's side St Patrick's Athletic in an eventual 2–1 defeat at Oriel Park. On 4 October 2024, Kenny scored a 91st-minute equaliser in a 1–1 draw away to Galway United at Eamonn Deacy Park, having come off the bench just 10 minutes earlier. The club were relegated on 18 October 2024 amid financial instability and changes of ownership. In early December 2024, he was subject to reported interest from EFL Championship club Blackburn Rovers. Despite these multiple factors, on 21 December 2024, he signed a new contract at the club. On 21 March 2025, Kenny scored the final goal of the game in the 78th minute of a 2–1 win over Longford Town at Oriel Park. Kenny contributed with 10 goals and 8 assists in 34 league appearances as his side won the 2025 League of Ireland First Division title. On 26 October 2025, he was part of the side that won the 2024–25 Leinster Senior Cup, defeating St Patrick's Athletic 2–1 in the final. Despite off-season reported interest from EFL League One clubs Lincoln City and Blackpool, on 12 January 2026, it was announced that he signed a new contract with the Dundalk. He was named League of Ireland Player of the Month for June 2026, his final month with the club. He scored a total of 21 goals in 94 appearances in all competitions during his time with the club.

=== Portsmouth ===
On 6 July 2026, Kenny signed for EFL Championship club Portsmouth on a three-year-contract for an undisclosed fee. On 8 August 2026, Kenny made his debut for the club, coming off the bench in a 3–1 defeat to West Ham United in an EFL Cup tie at the London Stadium. On 20 October 2026, he made his league debut for the club, replacing Abu Kamara from the bench in the 75th minute of a 1–1 draw away to Wolverhampton Wanderers at Molineux Stadium.

== Personal life ==
He is the son of former Republic of Ireland and 5 time League of Ireland Premier Division winning manager Stephen Kenny, and brother of 2026 Miss Ireland winner, Caoimhe Kenny.

== International career ==
=== Northern Ireland ===
Eligible for Northern Ireland having been born there, on 25 July 2022, he made his Northern Ireland U18 debut in a 3–2 loss to Manchester United U18s at the SuperCupNI. In November 2022, he made 2 appearances for the side in 2 separate 2–0 defeats to Austria U18.

=== Republic of Ireland ===
He received his first call up to the Republic of Ireland U19 side in September 2023 after deciding to switch international allegiance, for 2 friendlies against Bosnia and Herzegovina in which he featured in both a 1–1 draw and 1–0 loss.

=== Return to Northern Ireland ===
On 27 August 2025, Kenny was called up to the Northern Ireland U21 team for the first time, for their 2027 UEFA European Under-21 Championship qualification fixture away to Georgia U21. He made his debut in the game on 9 September 2025, as part of the starting XI in a 1–1 draw. In November 2026, he received his first call-up to the Northern Ireland senior squad for their UEFA Nations League fixtures.

== Career statistics ==
As of match played on 20 October 2026

Appearances and goals by club, season and competition
Club	Season	League			National Cup (Note: Includes FAI Cup & FA Cup)		League Cup (Note: Includes EFL Cup)		Europe		Other		Total	
Club	Season	Division	Apps	Goals	Apps	Goals	Apps	Goals	Apps	Goals	Apps	Goals	Apps	Goals
Dundalk	2023	LOI Premier Division	0	0	0	0	—		0 (Note: Appearance(s) in the UEFA Europa Conference League)	0	1 (Note: Appearance(s) in the Leinster Senior Cup)	0	1	0
Dundalk	2024	LOI Premier Division	25	2	1	0	—		—		4	1	30	3
Dundalk	2025	LOI First Division	34	10	1	0	—		—		4	2	39	12
Dundalk	2026	LOI Premier Division	22	5	0	0	—		—		2	2	24	7
Dundalk	Total		81	17	2	0	—		0	0	11	5	94	22
Wexford (loan)	2023	LOI First Division	10	1	2	1	—		—		0	0	12	2
Portsmouth	2026–27	EFL Championship	1	0	0	0	1	0	—		—		2	0
Career Total			92	18	4	1	1	0	0	0	11	5	107	24

== Honours ==
=== Club ===
Dundalk

- League of Ireland First Division: 2025
- Leinster Senior Cup: 2024–25

=== Individual ===
- League of Ireland Player of the Month: June 2026
