= Kingswood, Dublin =

Suburban area within Tallaght, Dublin, Ireland

Kingswood Coill An Rí (Irish)
- Suburban area
- Location in Dublin Kingswood (Ireland)
- Coordinates: 53°18′34″N 6°22′20″W
- Country: Ireland
- Province: Leinster
- County: County Dublin
- Local government area: South Dublin
- Time zone: UTC±0 (WET)
  - Summer (DST): UTC+1 (IST)
- Eircode routing key: D24
- Telephone area code: +353(0)1

Kingswood (Irish: Coill an Rí) is a suburban area within Tallaght, County Dublin, Ireland, in the local government area of South Dublin.

== Location ==
The area is bordered by the M50 motorway to the NE; the Belgard Road to the SW; N7 to the NW; Katharine Tynan Road to the SE. The latter is named for writer Katharine Tynan (1859–1931), who lived in the area. Historically a part of the hinterland of Clondalkin village yet lying inside the Parish of Tallaght, the Kingswood area is now divided by the Ballymount Road, with roughly two thirds in Dublin 24, and the remainder, west of the road, in Dublin 22, and therefore served by different garda stations.

== Amenities ==
Kingswood has a number of shops, a pub, a pharmacy, a church and a community centre. The community centre hosts several community groups, and the scout hall of the 158th Castleview Scout Group is nearby. The Catholic parish church is shared with Kilnamanagh.

Schools in the area include St Kilian's Junior School (founded in 1979), and St Kilian's Senior School (founded in 1986). Kingswood Community College, also known as Coláiste Pobail Coill an Rí and opened in September 2016, is a secondary school which (as of 2019) had an enrollment of 524 pupils.

== Transport ==
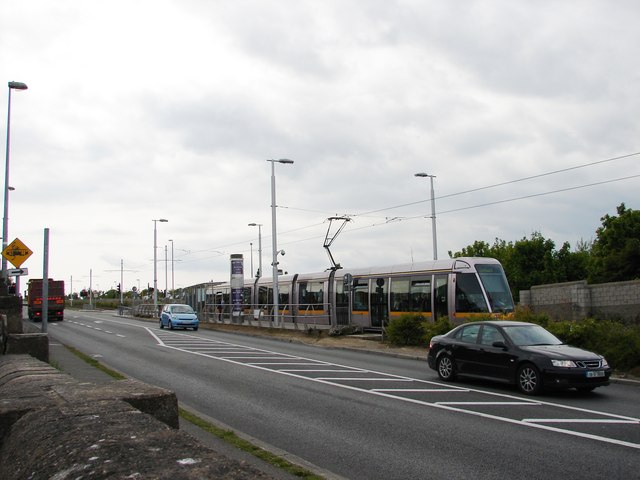
Luas tram at Kingswood stop

Kingswood Luas stop is on the Luas Red Line, with services to Tallaght/Saggart and The Point/Connolly. Dublin Bus route 56a also serves Kingswood.

== Sport ==
The local association football (soccer) club, Kingswood Castle FC, was founded in 2013. This club, which plays in black and green kits, uses Ballymount Park as a home pitch.

St Killians GAA Club merged with St. Kevins GAA Club in Kilnamanagh in 1998.
