= Leo Gaxha =

Albanian footballer (born 2002)

Personal information
- Full name: Leonardo Gaxha
- Date of birth: 27 July 2002 (age 24)
- Place of birth: Tralee, Ireland
- Height: 1.77 m (5 ft 10 in)
- Position: Forward

Team information
- Current team: Dundalk
- Number: 10

Youth career
- –2018: Tralee Dynamos
- 2018–2022: Sheffield United

Senior career*
Years	Team	Apps	(Gls)
2023	Kerry	35	(7)
2024	Galway United	8	(0)
2024	Athlone Town	12	(4)
2025–	Dundalk	32	(5)

International career^{‡}
2018	Republic of Ireland U16	2	(0)
2018	Republic of Ireland U17	1	(0)
2019	Albania U18	3	(0)
- * Club domestic league appearances and goals as of 16:52, 10 November 2026 (UTC) ‡ National team caps and goals as of 15 August 2019

Leonardo Gaxha (born 27 July 2002) is a footballer who plays as a forward for Dundalk. Born in Ireland, he represented Ireland and Albania at youth international level.

== Early life ==
Gaxha was born on 27 July 2002 in Tralee, Ireland where he grew up. Born to Albanian parents who moved to Ireland in 1999, he has a younger brother.

== Club career ==
As a youth player, Gaxha joined the youth academy of Irish side Tralee Dynamos. In 2018, he joined the youth academy of English side Sheffield United, where he befriended Ireland international John Egan. Ahead of the 2023 season, he returned home to Tralee, signing for his local League of Ireland First Division club Kerry, where he made thirty-five league appearances and scored seven goals. In 2024, he signed for League of Ireland Premier Division side Galway United, where he made 8 league appearances. The same year, he signed for League of Ireland First Division side Athlone Town, where he made 18 appearances in all competitions, scoring 4 goals. Subsequently, he signed for recently relegated League of Ireland First Division club Dundalk in 2025. He scored 6 goals in 21 appearances in all competitions up to 23 June 2025, when he suffered an Anterior cruciate ligament injury in a 1–0 defeat away to Finn Harps that ended his season prematurely. On 10 September 2025, he signed a new contract with the club while still out injured. Gaxha made his return to the side on 14 April 2026 in a 3–1 win over Shelbourne in the Leinster Senior Cup.

== Career statistics ==
As of match played 30 October 2026

Appearances and goals by club, season and competition
Club	Season	League			National Cup		Other		Total	
Club	Season	Division	Apps	Goals	Apps	Goals	Apps	Goals	Apps	Goals
Kerry	2023	LOI First Division	35	7	2	0	–		37	7
Galway United	2024	LOI Premier Division	8	0	–		–		8	0
Athlone Town	2024	LOI First Division	12	4	3	0	3 (Note: Appearances in the 2024 League of Ireland First Division Promotion Playoffs)	0	18	4
Dundalk	2025	LOI First Division	18	5	0	0	3 (Note: Appearance(s) in the Leinster Senior Cup)	1	21	6
Dundalk	2026	LOI Premier Division	14	0	3	2	2	0	19	2
Dundalk	Total		32	5	3	2	5	1	40	8
Career total			88	16	8	2	8	1	104	19

== Honours ==
Dundalk

- League of Ireland First Division: 2025
- Leinster Senior Cup: 2024–25
