= Daryl Horgan =

Irish footballer

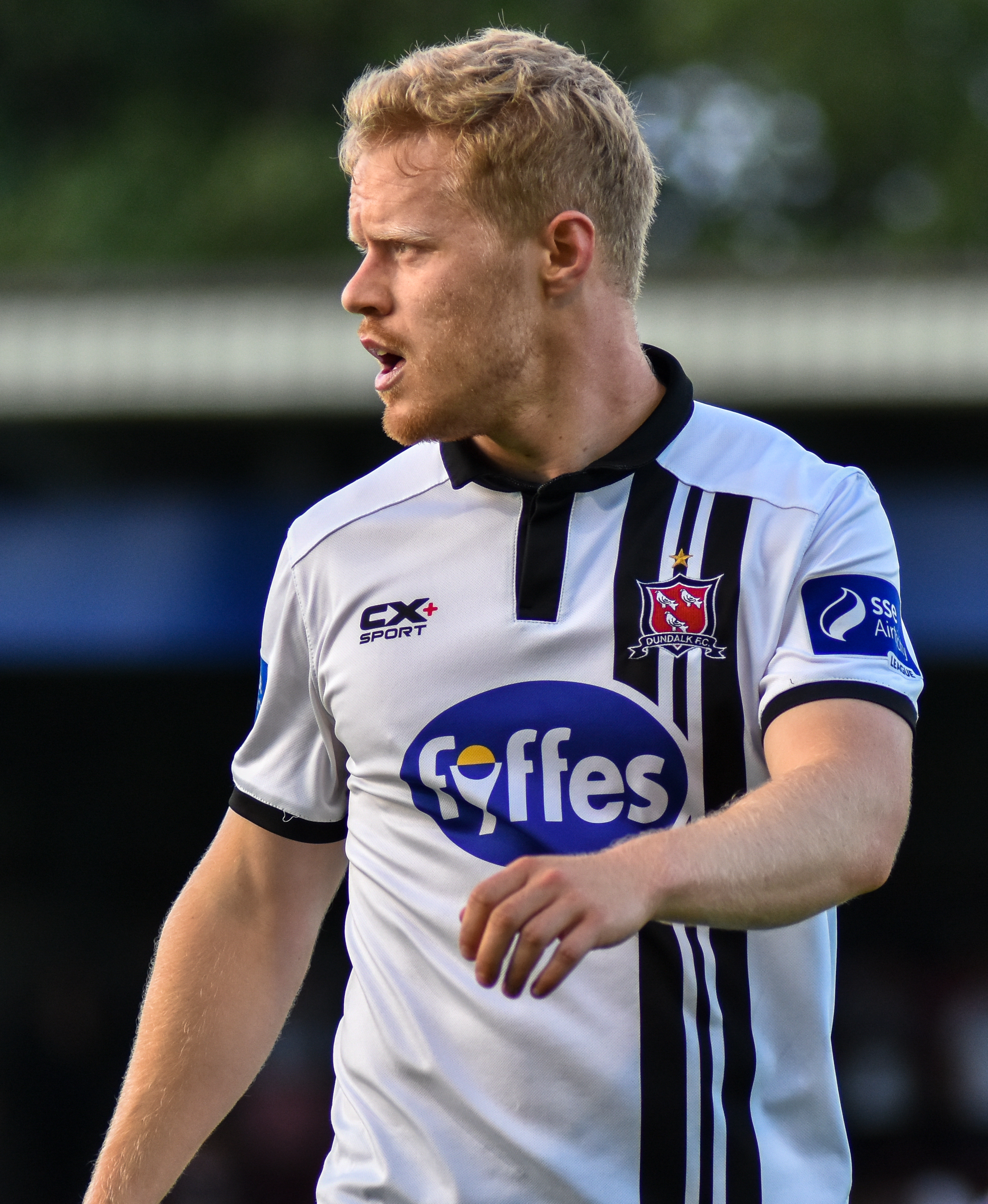
- Horgan with Dundalk in 2016

Personal information
- Full name: Daryl Jeremiah Horgan
- Date of birth: 10 August 1992 (age 34)
- Place of birth: Galway, Ireland
- Height: 1.70 m (5 ft 7 in)
- Position: Winger

Team information
- Current team: Dundalk
- Number: 7

Youth career
- 2000–2010: Salthill Devon

Senior career*
Years	Team	Apps	(Gls)
2010	Salthill Devon	23	(2)
2011	Sligo Rovers	10	(1)
2011	→ Cork City (loan)	13	(7)
2012–2013	Cork City	59	(11)
2014–2016	Dundalk	97	(23)
2017–2018	Preston North End	40	(3)
2018–2020	Hibernian	67	(6)
2020–2023	Wycombe Wanderers	85	(1)
2023	→ Stevenage (loan)	14	(0)
2023–	Dundalk	113	(30)

International career^{‡}
2010	Republic of Ireland U19	5	(0)
2013	Republic of Ireland U21	1	(0)
2017–2021	Republic of Ireland	17	(1)
- * Club domestic league appearances and goals as of 16:50, 10 November 2026 (UTC) ‡ National team caps and goals as of 9 October 2021 (UTC)

Daryl Jeremiah Horgan (born 10 August 1992) is an Irish professional footballer who plays as a winger for League of Ireland Premier Division club Dundalk. He has been capped 17 times for the Republic of Ireland national team between 2017 and 2021.

Horgan was born in Galway and played youth football with Salthill Devon. He began his career with Salthill in 2010 in the League of Ireland First Division before starting his professional career with Sligo Rovers the following year. After a loan move to Cork City in July 2011 resulted in a First Division title, Horgan signed a permanent deal with the Munster club later that year. He had scored 21 goals in 79 appearances for Cork City before a move to Dundalk in 2013.

Horgan was a member of the Dundalk team which became the first Irish side to reach the play-off round of the Champions League in August 2016. With Dundalk he achieved Premier Division title success in three consecutive seasons from 2014 to 2016. Horgan amassed 132 appearances for Dundalk across three seasons, scoring 27 goals. He moved to English club Preston North End in January 2017, and was then transferred to Scottish club Hibernian in August 2018. Horgan was a regular in the Hibernian team and played a total of 81 times and scored 10 goals including 2 against city rivals Heart of Midlothian before signing for newly promoted Championship club Wycombe Wanderers in September 2020.

Horgan has represented his country at under-19 and under-21 level. In November 2016, he earned his first call-up to the senior squad for a 2018 World Cup qualifying match against Austria. He made his full international debut in March 2017.

== Early life ==
Horgan was born in Galway and attended Coláiste Éinde in Salthill between 2005 and 2010 where he studied for his Leaving Certificate. He was part of the Salthill Devon youth team that reached the final of the FAI Youth Cup in 2009. He is the eldest of four brothers, with his younger brothers Colm, Kevin and Christopher all having played professional football in the League of Ireland and in Colm's case, alongside Daryl for Salthill Devon in the League of Ireland First Division in 2010. His father, Tom, coached at Salthill Devon for a number of years.

== Club career ==
=== Salthill Devon ===
Horgan was a key member of Salthill Devon's side during their 2010 First Division campaign, making 23 league appearances and scoring twice. Horgan was also a key member in their under-20 side who were beaten by UCD in the All-Ireland Final.

=== Sligo Rovers ===
In February 2011, Horgan signed for Paul Cook at Sligo Rovers, having impressed the manager while playing on trial for Finn Harps against Sligo in a pre-season friendly. He made his Sligo debut on 9 April 2011, coming on as a substitute against St Patrick's Athletic at the Showgrounds and scored his first goal against Cockhill Celtic in the EA Sports Cup two weeks later. Horgan made 13 appearances for Sligo before joining Cork City on loan in July 2011.

=== Cork City ===
He made his debut for Cork City against Salthill Devon on 8 July 2011 and scored his first goals for the club in a 3–1 win away to Longford Town two weeks later when he got on the scoresheet twice. By the end of the season he had scored seven league goals for Cork City as they lifted the First Division title.

On 2 December 2011, Horgan signed a permanent two-year deal at Cork City. Over the next two seasons, he scored 10 times in 58 league appearances, including a Goal of the Season contender against Drogheda United on 14 June 2013 that received coverage in Marca and la Repubblica. He cemented a reputation as one of the league's brightest young talents after earning a nomination for the PFAI Young Player of the Year and being included in the PFAI Premier Division Team of the Year.

=== Dundalk ===
At the end of the 2013 season, Horgan left Cork City and despite interest from Shamrock Rovers and St. Patrick's Athletic as well as trials at Barnsley and Torquay United, he signed for Dundalk on 9 December 2013. Due to the fact he was under the age of 24, Dundalk had to pay a fee of €10,000 in compensation. In his first season at the club, he scored five goals in 33 league appearances to help win the Premier Division title and League Cup, while on a personal level he was named PFAI Young Player of the Year.

In 2015, he netted nine times in 33 league appearances and was an integral part of the side which won the league and FAI Cup double. At the end of the season, Horgan signed a new one-year contract at the club.

His form throughout the 2016 season earned him comparisons to Damien Duff and Philippe Coutinho, while in August 2016, Galway United manager Tommy Dunne stated that he regarded Horgan as the best player in Ireland. He appeared in all six of Dundalk's Champions League qualifier games in 2016 as they became the first ever Irish side to reach the play-off round. Dundalk went on to qualify for the 2016–17 UEFA Europa League group stage for the first time and Daryl scored for Dundalk in the away game against FC Zenit Saint Petersburg, but lost 2–1. Horgan began attracting more attention from clubs abroad with his contract due to expire at the end of 2016. In October 2016, Horgan began reportedly attracting attention from Everton, Sunderland, Newcastle United and Ipswich Town, as well as clubs in the MLS and A-League.

=== Preston North End ===
It was announced on 12 December 2016 that Horgan and teammate Andy Boyle would be joining Championship club Preston North End on 1 January 2017. Horgan made his debut in an FA Cup tie against Arsenal on 7 January 2017, coming off the bench to replace Daniel Johnson. Seven days later, on his first start for the club, he provided an assist for Callum Robinson's second-half goal in a 2–0 home win over Brighton & Hove Albion. He scored his first Preston goal on 11 February 2017 in a 4–2 home win over Brentford. His second goal for the club came on 11 March in a 3–0 victory over Reading which helped to keep alive their play-off hopes. Preston eventually missed out on the play-offs and ended the season in 11th place.

Horgan's second season at Preston was one of frustration as he was reduced to mostly substitute appearances and had made only five starts by the end of March 2018.

=== Hibernian ===
Horgan signed a three-year contract with Scottish Premiership club Hibernian on 11 August 2018, having moved from Preston for an undisclosed transfer fee. He made his debut for the club the following day, coming on as a substitute in the 63rd minute of a 1–1 draw against St Johnstone at McDiarmid Park. He scored both goals for Hibs in a 2–1 win against Hearts on 6 April 2019, in what was their first Edinburgh derby win at Tynecastle for six years. His two goals made history as he became the first Hibs player to score a double at Tynecastle in 34 years.

=== Wycombe Wanderers ===
On 2 September 2020, Horgan joined Championship club Wycombe Wanderers on a two-year deal for fee around £50,000. Four days later, he scored on his Wycombe debut in an EFL Cup first round defeat to Brentford with the London side winning 4–2 in a penalty shootout after the match had finished 1–1.

Horgan played in the 2022 EFL League One play-off final at Wembley Stadium.

==== Stevenage loan ====
On 5 January 2023, Horgan signed for League Two club Stevenage on loan until the end of the season. Horgan featured 14 times for Stevenage during his loan spell as they finished second in the league, gaining automatic promotion to EFL League One. On 10 May 2023, it was announced that Horgan would be leaving Wycombe Wanderers at the end of his contract on 30 June 2023.

=== Return to Dundalk ===
On 1 August 2023, it was announced that Horgan had returned to the League of Ireland Premier Division, signing for his old club Dundalk.

== International career ==
Horgan was capped at under-18 schools level for the Republic of Ireland at the beginning of 2010, scoring in a 3–1 victory over Australia in January, and later appearing in the Centenary Shield in March. In October 2010, Horgan made his debut for the Republic of Ireland at under-19 level in a 0–0 draw with Ukraine at Morton Stadium. He appeared at this level on a further four occasions in 2010, including 3 appearances in UEFA European Under-19 Championship qualifying against Luxembourg, Bulgaria and Serbia. Horgan later progressed to the Republic of Ireland under-21 side, receiving one cap.

In September 2016, calls for Horgan's inclusion in the Republic of Ireland senior team intensified from the media and other figures such as Ireland captain Séamus Coleman and ex-internationals Kevin Kilbane and Stephen Hunt following his performances for Dundalk in the league and European campaign. When Republic of Ireland manager Martin O'Neill named his squad for World Cup qualifiers against Moldova and Georgia in October 2016, he stated that Horgan would have been called up if it hadn't been for Dundalk's hectic fixture schedule as the end of the League of Ireland season approached. Following a two-goal haul against Cork City in a top-of-the-table league match attended by Martin O'Neill on 11 October 2016, there were further calls for Horgan to be included in Ireland's international squad once the domestic season reached its conclusion. On 2 November 2016, Horgan was called up for the first time by Republic of Ireland manager Martin O'Neill in his 35-man preliminary squad for a 2018 World Cup qualifier against Austria, along with fellow Dundalk teammate Andy Boyle.

On 7 November 2016, he was confirmed as a member of the final 28-man squad for the match against Austria. He made the final match-day squad of 23, but remained on the bench for the full match.

On 28 March 2017, he made his senior international debut, coming on as a second-half substitute in a 1–0 friendly defeat against Iceland at the Aviva Stadium. Horgan scored his first senior international goal on the 3 June 2021 in a 4–1 win over Andorra in a friendly at the Estadi Nacional.

== Career statistics ==
=== Club ===
As of match played on 30 October 2026

Appearances and goals by club, season and competition
Club	Season	League			National Cup		League Cup		Europe		Other		Total	
Club	Season	Division	Apps	Goals	Apps	Goals	Apps	Goals	Apps	Goals	Apps	Goals	Apps	Goals
Salthill Devon	2010	LOI First Division	23	2	0	0	0	0	—		2 (Note: Appearances in First Division relegation play-offs)	0	25	2
Sligo Rovers	2011	LOI Premier Division	10	1	0	0	1	1	—		2 (Note: Appearances in Setanta Sports Cup)	1	13	3
Cork City (loan)	2011	LOI First Division	13	7	0	0	0	0	—		—		13	7
Cork City	2012	LOI Premier Division	28	4	1	0	1	1	—		—		30	5
Cork City	2013	LOI Premier Division	30	6	0	0	0	0	—		6	3	36	9
Cork City	Total		58	10	1	0	1	1	—		6	3	66	14
Dundalk	2014	LOI Premier Division	33	5	2	0	1	0	3 (Note: Appearances in UEFA Europa League)	0	4	1	43	6
Dundalk	2015	LOI Premier Division	33	9	3	1	1	0	2 (Note: Appearances in UEFA Champions League)	0	1 (Note: Appearances in President of Ireland's Cup)	1	40	11
Dundalk	2016	LOI Premier Division	31	9	4	0	1	0	12 (Note: Six appearances in the UEFA Champions League, six appearances and one goal in the UEFA Europa League)	1	1	0	49	10
Dundalk	Total		97	23	9	1	3	0	17	1	6	2	132	27
Preston North End	2016–17	EFL Championship	19	2	1	0	0	0	—		—		20	2
Preston North End	2017–18	EFL Championship	20	1	2	1	1	0	—		—		23	2
Preston North End	2018–19	EFL Championship	1	0	0	0	0	0	—		—		1	0
Preston North End	Total		40	3	3	1	1	0	—		—		44	4
Hibernian	2018–19	Scottish Premiership	34	3	3	3	1	1	—		—		38	7
Hibernian	2019–20	Scottish Premiership	28	3	3	0	7	0	—		—		38	3
Hibernian	2020–21	Scottish Premiership	5	0	0	0	0	0	—		—		5	0
Hibernian	Total		67	6	6	3	8	1	—		—		81	10
Wycombe Wanderers	2020–21	EFL Championship	40	0	1	0	1	1	—		—		42	1
Wycombe Wanderers	2021–22	EFL League One	34	1	2	0	3	0	—		3 (Note: Appearances in 2022 EFL League One play-offs)	0	42	1
Wycombe Wanderers	2022–23	EFL League One	11	0	1	0	2	0	—		3 (Note: Appearances in EFL Trophy)	1	17	1
Wycombe Wanderers	Total		85	1	4	0	6	1	—		6	1	101	3
Stevenage (loan)	2022–23	EFL League Two	14	0	—		—		—		—		14	0
Dundalk	2023	LOI Premier Division	11	3	2	1	—		0	0	—		13	4
Dundalk	2024	LOI Premier Division	34	4	1	0	—		—		3 (Note: Appearances in Leinster Senior Cup)	0	38	4
Dundalk	2025	LOI First Division	33	11	1	0	—		—		3	2	37	13
Dundalk	2026	LOI Premier Division	35	12	1	0	—		—		2	1	38	13
Dundalk	Total		113	30	5	1	—		0	0	8	3	126	34
Career total			499	83	28	6	20	4	17	1	30	10	615	104

=== International ===
As of match played 9 October 2021

Appearances and goals by national team and year
National team	Year	Apps	Goals
Republic of Ireland	2017	2	0
Republic of Ireland	2018	4	0
Republic of Ireland	2019	0	0
Republic of Ireland	2020	5	0
Republic of Ireland	2021	6	1
Total		17	1

Scores and results list the Republic of Ireland's goal tally first.

No	Date	Venue	Opponent	Score	Result	Competition
1.	3 June 2021	Estadi Nacional, Andorra la Vella, Andorra	Andorra	4–1	4–1	Friendly

== Honours ==
Cork City

- League of Ireland First Division: 2011

Dundalk

- League of Ireland Premier Division (3): 2014, 2015, 2016
- FAI Cup: 2015
- League of Ireland Cup: 2014
- President's Cup: 2015
- League of Ireland First Division: 2025
- Leinster Senior Cup: 2024–25

Stevenage

- EFL League Two 2nd place (promotion): 2022–23

Individual

- PFAI Player of the Year: 2016, 2026
- PFAI Young Player of the Year: 2014
- PFAI Premier Division Team of the Year: 2013, 2014, 2015, 2016, 2026
- PFAI First Division Team of the Year: 2025
- League of Ireland Premier Division Player of the Month: May 2014, May 2015, May 2016, September 2016, May 2026
