= 2024 Dundalk F.C. season =

Irish football season

Dundalk
2024 season
- Chairman: Brian Ainscough (until 17 September)
- Head coach: Stephen O'Donnell (until 8 April) Brian Gartland & Liam Burns (interim 9–20 April); Noel King (from 21 April–15 May); Liam Burns (interim from 15-24 May) Jon Daly (from 24 May)
- Stadium: Oriel Park
- League of Ireland: 10th (relegated)
- FAI Cup: First round
- Leinster Senior Cup: Quarter-final
- Top goalscorer: League: Jamie Gullan (6); All: Jamie Gullan (6)
- Highest home attendance: 3,122 v Galway United, 23 February 2024
- Average home league attendance: 2,419
- Biggest win: 4–2 (versus Drogheda United (Round 24)
- Biggest defeat: 0–5 (versus Sligo Rovers (Round 4)
Home colours	Away colours

Dundalk entered the 2024 season having finished in fifth place in the league the previous season, which meant that they did not qualify for European competition in 2024–25. Stephen O'Donnell was the club's head coach going into the new term, his third season in charge.

During the close season, US-based businessman Brian Ainscough took ownership of the club from Andy Connolly and STATSports duo Seán O'Connor and Alan Clarke. Record goalscorer Pat Hoban was sold to Derry City ahead of the new season, having scored a total of 150 goals over eight seasons.

2024 was Dundalk's 16th consecutive season in the top tier of Irish football, their 89th in all, and their 98th in the League of Ireland.

== Season summary ==
The season began with the Leinster Senior Cup and they were knocked out in the Quarter finals by St. Mochta's of the Leinster Senior League.

The league season consisting of 36 matches (four series of nine matches) began on 16 February 2024. A poor start to the league programme, which saw Dundalk at the foot of the table with no wins after eight matches, resulted in O'Donnell being let go. He was replaced on an interim basis by the club's Head of Football operations, Brian Gartland, and first team coach, Liam Burns.

Noel King, a former player of the club, was subsequently named manager on 20 April. His tenure lasted 25 days before he resigned, citing medical issues. By this point, Gartland had also been let go, ending his 11-year association with the club. Liam Burns resumed the interim manager role before Jon Daly was subsequently appointed as the club's new manager.

The club briefly saw an improvement in form. However, after several defeats and with seven games left to play, Daly confirmed rumours that players and staff at the club had not been paid. It was subsequently revealed that the club had amassed debts in excess of €1 million and was in immediate danger of insolvency. The club was subsequently rescued by a Dundalk-based barrister, John Temple. But they were relegated with two games remaining following a string of defeats, with Daly also confirming that he would leave the club after the final match.

During the season, a new club record was set of eight home league matches in a row without conceding a goal. TJ Molloy-Murray became the club's youngest first-team player at 15 years and 7 months in the final league match of the season.

In the FAI Cup, they went out in the first round to Drogheda United.

=== First-Team Squad (2024) ===
Sources: Note: Substitute appearances in brackets

No.	Name	DOB	Pos.	Debut	League		FAI Cup		Leinster Cup		Totals	
No.	Name	DOB	Pos.	Debut	Apps	Goals	Apps	Goals	Apps	Goals	Apps	Goals
1	(Scotland) Ross Munro	1 April 2000	GK	2024	19 (1)	0	0	0	2	0	22	0
2	(England) Archie Davies (Note: transferred to Carlisle United after Round 23)	7 October 1998	DF	2023	22	0	0	0	2	1	24	1
3	(Scotland) Jamie Walker	21 February 2001	DF	2024	3	0	0	0	2	0	5	0
4	(Republic of Ireland) Andy Boyle	7 March 1991	DF	2013	26	0	0	0	1 (1)	0	28	0
5	(Gibraltar) Louie Annesley (Note: transferred to Braintree Town after Round 22)	3 May 2000	DF	2023	3 (2)	0	0	0	1	0	6	0
6	(Netherlands) Koen Oostenbrink	26 January 2000	MF	2024	9 (5)	0	0	0	1 (1)	0	16	0
7	(Republic of Ireland) Daryl Horgan	10 August 1992	FW	2014	34 (2)	4	1	0	2 (1)	0	40	4
8	(Republic of Ireland) Robbie Benson	7 May 1992	MF	2016	28 (2)	4	1	0	2	0	33	4
9	(Scotland) Jamie Gullan	2 July 1999	FW	2024	24 (7)	6	1	0	0	0	32	6
10	(Republic of Ireland) Robbie Mahon	6 June 2003	FW	2024	7 (12)	0	0	0	3	0	22	0
11	(Republic of Ireland) Ryan O'Kane	16 August 2003	Winger	2021	14 (19)	3	1	0	2	1	36	4
12	(England) George Shelvey (Note: contract cancelled 29 May 2024)	22 April 2001	GK	2024	9	0	0	0	0	0	9	0
13	(England) Zak Johnson (Note: on loan from Sunderland until Round 23)	30 July 2004	DF	2024	17 (1)	0	0	0	0	0	18	0
14	(Scotland) Cameron Elliott (Note: transferred to East Kilbride after Round 24)	27 May 1999	FW	2023	7 (10)	0	0 (1)	0	2	0	20	0
15	(Republic of Ireland) Mayowa Animasahun	8 August 2003	DF	2021	16 (3)	0	1	0	1	0	21	0
16	(England) Hayden Muller (Note: transferred to Sutton United after Round 23)	7 February 2002	DF	2023	10 (6)	0	0	0	2 (1)	1	19	1
16	(England) Felix Goddard (Note: on loan from Blackburn Rovers from Round 24)	9 March 2004	GK	2024	6	0	1	0	0	0	7	0
17	(Republic of Ireland) Dara Keane	24 December 1998	MF	2024	1 (12)	0	0	0	0	0	13	0
18	(Scotland) Scott High (Note: on loan from Huddersfield Town until Round 14)	15 February 2001	MF	2024	14	1	0	0	0	0	14	1
18	(Scotland) Josh O'Connor (Note: on loan from Hibernian from Round 25)	16 June 2004	FW	2024	0 (1)	0	0	0	0	0	1	0
19	(Republic of Ireland) Vincent Leonard	21 March 2008	MF	2024	0 (1)	0	0	0	1	0	2	0
20	(Republic of Ireland) Luke Mulligan	13 November 2007	MF	2024	0 (2)	0	0	0	0 (2)	0	4	0
21	(Republic of Ireland) Paul Doyle	10 April 1998	MF	2022	15 (4)	0	0	0	3	0	22	0
22	(Sri Lanka) Sam Durrant	16 February 2002	Winger	2023	6 (12)	0	0	0	0	0	18	0
22	(Republic of Ireland) TJ Molloy-Murray	4 April 2009	FW	2024	0 (1)	0	0	0	0	0	1	0
23	(Republic of Ireland) John Mountney	22 February 1993	MF	2012	24 (4)	2	1	0	0	0	32	2
24	(Northern Ireland) Eoin Kenny	30 December 2005	FW	2024	9 (16)	2	0 (1)	0	2 (2)	1	30	3
25	(Republic of Ireland) Sean Molloy	23 February 2005	GK	2024	2	0	0	0	1	0	3	0
26	(Republic of Ireland) Sean Keogh	15 April 2006	DF	2024	10 (1)	0	1	0	1	0	13	0
27	(Scotland) Scott McGill (Note: signed ahead of Round 23)	27 January 2002	MF	2024	2 (7)	0	1	0	0	0	10	0
28	(England) Bobby Faulkner (Note: on loan from Doncaster Rovers from Round 23)	5 August 2004	DF	2024	3 (1)	0	1	1	0	0	5	1
29	(Northern Ireland) Ciaran McGuckin (Note: on loan from Rotherham United until Round 7)	30 December 2003	FW	2024	2 (3)	0	0	0	0	0	5	0
30	(England) Zak Bradshaw (Note: on loan from Lincoln City until Round 21)	22 September 2003	DF	2024	17 (1)	0	0	0	1	0	19	0
36	(England) Dan Pike (Note: signed ahead of Round 24)	9 January 2002	DF	2024	8 (1)	0	0 (1)	0	0	0	10	0
37	(New Zealand) Norman Garbett (Note: signed ahead of Round 23)	27 February 2004	MF	2024	0 (6)	0	0 (1)	0	0	0	7	0
38	(England) Hayden Cann (Note: signed ahead of Round 23)	1 October 2003	DF	2024	9	0	0	0	0	0	9	0
39	(Republic of Ireland) Aodh Dervin (Note: signed ahead of FAI Cup first round)	21 July 1999	MF	2024	12	0	0 (1)	0	0	0	13	0
40	(Republic of Ireland) Jad Hakiki (Note: signed ahead of Round 23)	23 June 2004	MF	2024	8 (4)	1	1	0	0	0	13	1

== Competitions ==
Win Draw Loss

=== Premier Division ===
16 February 2024 Round 1	Shamrock Rovers	1–1	Dundalk	Tallaght, Dublin
19:45	Greene 59'	Report	Jamie Gullan 33'	Stadium: Tallaght Stadium; Attendance: 7,610; Referee: Rob Hennessy

23 February 2024 Round 2	Dundalk	0–2	Galway United	Dundalk
19:45		Report	McCarthy 11'; Dervin 30'	Stadium: Oriel Park; Attendance: 3,122; Referee: Gavin Colfer

1 March 2024 Round 3	Bohemians	P–P	Dundalk	Phibsborough, Dublin
19:45				Stadium: Dalymount Park

4 March 2024 Round 4	Dundalk	0–5	Sligo Rovers	Dundalk
19:45		Report	Chapman 7', 33'; Hartmann 14'; Mata 38', 61'	Stadium: Oriel Park; Attendance: 1,663; Referee: Mark Lynch

8 March 2024 Round 5	St Patrick's Athletic	1–0	Dundalk	Inchicore, Dublin
19:45	Keating 30'	Report		Stadium: Richmond Park; Attendance: 4,513; Referee: Ray Matthews

15 March 2024 Round 6	Dundalk	0–0	Waterford	Dundalk
19:45		Report		Stadium: Oriel Park; Attendance: 2,243; Referee: Tom O'Sullivan

29 March 2024 Round 7	Shelbourne	2–1	Dundalk	Drumcondra, Dublin
19:45	Burt 51', 74'	Report	Robbie Benson 90'	Stadium: Tolka Park; Attendance: 4,012; Referee: Damien MacGraith

1 April 2024 Round 8	Dundalk	0–0	Drogheda United	Dundalk
13:00	Archie Davies (red card) 90'	Report	Heeney (red card) 70'	Stadium: Oriel Park; Attendance: 2,458; Referee: Paul McLaughlin

5 April 2024 Round 9	Derry City	4–1	Dundalk	Derry, Northern Ireland
19:45	O'Reilly 31'; Patching 46'; Mullen 58'; Duffy 65'	Report	Ryan O'Kane 75'	Stadium: Ryan McBride Brandywell Stadium; Attendance: 3,060; Referee: David Dunne

12 April 2024 Round 10	Dundalk	0–0	St Patrick's Athletic	Dundalk
19:45		Report		Stadium: Oriel Park; Attendance: 2,325; Referee: Gavin Colfer

15 April 2024 Round 3 (refixed)	Bohemians	1–0	Dundalk	Phibsborough, Dublin
19:45	Akintunde 81'	Report		Stadium: Dalymount Park; Attendance: 4,045; Referee: Eoghan O'Shea

19 April 2023 Round 11	Sligo Rovers	1–1	Dundalk	Sligo
19:45	Hartmann 16'	Report	Jamie Gullan (pen.) 49'	Stadium: The Showgrounds; Attendance: 2,287; Referee: Paul Norton

26 April 2024 Round 12	Dundalk	2–0	Bohemians	Dundalk
19:45	Scott High 13'; Robbie Benson 35'	Report		Stadium: Oriel Park; Attendance: 2,770; Referee: Rob Hennessy

3 May 2024 Round 13	Dundalk	0–0	Shelbourne	Dundalk
19:45		Report		Stadium: Oriel Park; Attendance: 2,806; Referee: Eoghan O'Shea

6 May 2024 Round 14	Drogheda United	2–1	Dundalk	Drogheda
13:00	Pierrot 55'; Barr (red card) 74'; Cann 90'	Report	Jamie Gullan 79'; George Shelvey (red card) 90'	Stadium: Weavers Park; Attendance: 2,339; Referee: Rob Harvey

10 May 2024 Round 15	Waterford	4–1	Dundalk	Waterford
19:45	Asamoah 2', 44', 76'; Pattisson 53'	Report	Robbie Benson 22'	Stadium: Waterford Regional Sports Centre; Attendance: 2,178; Referee: David Dunne

17 May 2024 Round 16	Dundalk	1–0	Shamrock Rovers	Oriel Park
19:45	John Mountney 90'	Report		Attendance: 2,530; Referee: Alan Patchell

24 May 2024 Round 17	Galway United	2–0	Dundalk	Galway
19:45	Munro o.g. 23'; Nugent 72'			Stadium: Eamonn Deacy Park; Attendance: 2,302; Referee: Mark Houlihan

31 May 2024 Round 18	Dundalk	0–0	Derry City	Oriel Park
19:45		Report		Attendance: 2,411; Referee: Daniel Murphy

3 June 2024 Round 19	St Patrick's Athletic	2–3	Dundalk	Inchicore, Dublin
17:15	Chris Forrester 27' (pen.); Jamie Lennon 35'	Report	Jamie Gullan 2', 22'; Ryan O'Kane 4'	Stadium: Richmond Park; Attendance: 3,934; Referee: Rob Hennessy

7 June 2024 Round 20	Shelbourne	1–0	Dundalk	Drumcondra, Dublin
19:45	Martin 71'	Report		Stadium: Tolka Park; Attendance: 3,850; Referee: Damien MacGraith

13 June 2024 Round 21	Dundalk	1–0	Sligo Rovers	Dundalk
19:45	Daryl Horgan 54'	Report		Stadium: Oriel Park; Attendance: 2,036; Referee: Paul McLaughlin

28 June 2024 Round 22	Dundalk	0–2	Waterford	Dundalk
19:45		Report	Parsons 19'; McMenamy 43'	Stadium: Oriel Park; Attendance: 2,073; Referee: Paul Norton

5 July 2024 Round 23	Shamrock Rovers	1–0	Dundalk	Tallaght, Dublin
20:00	Kenny 29'	Report		Stadium: Tallaght Stadium; Attendance: 5,317; Referee: Marc Lynch

12 July 2024 Round 24	Dundalk	4–2	Drogheda United	Dundalk
19:45	Jad Hakiki 8'; Ryan O'Kane 16'; Daryl Horgan 56', 86'	Report	Douglas James-Taylor 37', 90' (pen.)	Stadium: Oriel Park; Attendance: 2,776; Referee: Rob Hennessy

26 July 2024 Round 25	Bohemians	1–1	Dundalk	Phibsborough, Dublin
19:45	Tierney 18'		Daryl Horgan 27'	Stadium: Dalymount Park; Attendance: 4,239

2nd August 2024 Round 26	Dundalk	0–2	Galway United	Dundalk
19:45	Walsh 54', 89'	Report		Stadium: Oriel Park; Attendance: 2,176; Referee: Paul Norton

9 August 2024 Round 27	Derry City	1–1	Dundalk	Derry, Northern Ireland
19:45	Mullen 64'	Report	John Mountney 21'	Stadium: Ryan McBride Brandywell Stadium; Attendance: 2,384; Referee: Rob Harvey

30 August 2024 Round 28	Dundalk	0–1	Shelbourne	Dundalk
19:45		Report	O'Brien 4'	Stadium: Oriel Park; Attendance: 2,234; Referee: Eoghan O'Shea

5 September 2024 Round 29	Dundalk	1–2	St Patrick's Athletic	Dundalk
19:45	Kenny 2'	Report	Grivosti 55'; Mason Melia 70'	Stadium: Oriel Park; Attendance: 2,325; Referee: Damien MacGraith

13 September 2024 Round 30	Waterford	2–1	Dundalk	Waterford
19:45	Bellis 5'; Amond 16'	Report	Jamie Gullan 76'	Stadium: Waterford Regional Sports Centre; Attendance: 2,276; Referee: Rob Hennessy

21 September 2023 Round 31	Sligo Rovers	2–1	Dundalk	Sligo
19:45	Waweru 69'; Chapman (pen.) 75'		Robbie Benson (pen.) 24'; Hayden Cann (red card) 74'	Stadium: The Showgrounds; Attendance: 2,754; Referee: Marc Lynch

28 September 2024 Round 32	Dundalk	0–2	Bohemians	Dundalk
19:45		Report	Devoy 58'; McDonnell 85'	Stadium: Oriel Park; Attendance: 3,086; Referee: Kevin O’Sullivan.

4 October 2024 Round 33	Galway United	1–1	Dundalk	Galway
19:45	Hickey 41'	Report	Kenny 90+1'	Stadium: Eamonn Deacy Park; Attendance: 4,291; Referee: Eoghan O’Shea

18 October 2024 Round 34	Dundalk	0–2	Derry City	Oriel Park
19:45		Report	Whelan 16'; Patching 77' (pen.)	Attendance: 2,341; Referee: Gavin Colfer

27 October 2024 Round 35	Dundalk	0–1	Shamrock Rovers	Oriel Park
17:45		Report	Watts 58'	Attendance: 2,224; Referee: Rob Harvey

1 November 2024 Round 36	Drogheda United	0–0	Dundalk	Drogheda
19:45		Report		Stadium: Weavers Park; Attendance: 2.030; Referee: Damian MacGraith

==== League table ====
Pos	Team	Pld	W	D	L	GF	GA	GD	Pts	Qualification or relegation
6	Sligo Rovers	36	13	10	13	40	51	−11	49	
7	Waterford	36	13	6	17	43	47	−4	45	
8	Bohemians	36	10	12	14	39	43	−4	42	
9	Drogheda United (O)	36	7	13	16	41	58	−17	34	Qualification for promotion/relegation play-off (Note: Drogheda United were expelled from the Conference League second qualifying round which they qualified as the 2024 FAI Cup winners, as their owners Trivela Group also own Danish club Silkeborg, who finished seventh in Danish Superliga. Due to the multi-club ownership rule, only Silkeborg could be admitted to the Conference League as they have a higher league position. As no team from Republic of Ireland could replace them because of UEFA licensing issues, the second-placed Shamrock Rovers were moved from the first qualifying round to the second qualifying round along with Dinamo City of Albania, the next highest association cup winners.)
10	Dundalk (R)	36	5	11	20	23	50	−27	26	Relegation to League of Ireland First Division

Source: SSE Airtricity League, Soccerway
Rules for classification: 1) Points; 2) Goal difference; 3) Goals scored.
(O) Play-off winners; (R) Relegated

=== FAI Cup ===
19 July 2024 First round	Drogheda United	2–1	Dundalk	Drogheda
19:45	James Bolger 16'; Warren Davis 74'	Report	Bobby Faulkner 90'	Stadium: Weavers Park; Attendance: 2,280; Referee: Damien MacGraith

=== Fourth Round Group A ===
Team	Pld	W	D	L	GF	GA	GD	Pts
Drogheda United	3	3	0	0	9	4	+5	9
Dundalk	3	1	1	1	4	3	+1	4
Bohemians	3	1	1	1	2	3	-1	4
Malahide	3	0	0	3	3	8	-5	0

==== Matchday 1 ====
22 January 2024

Malahide United	1–3	Dundalk
O'Shaughnessy 42'	Report	Ryan O'Kane 2'; Hayden Muller 19'; Archie Davies 61'

Gannon Park
Attendance: Unreported
Referee: Owen Murphy

==== Matchday 2 ====
29 January 2024

Dundalk	1–2	Drogheda United
Eoin Kenny 55'	Report	Warren Davis 66', 90'

Oriel Park
Attendance: Unreported
Referee: Alan Patchell

==== Matchday 3 ====
5 February 2024

Dundalk	0–0	Bohemians
	Report

Oriel Park
Attendance: Unreported
Referee: Robert Harvey

=== Quarter Final ===
19 March 2024	St Mochta's	2–0	Dundalk	Clonsilla
	Dean Casey 29', 33'	Report		Stadium: Porterstown Road; Attendance: Unreported; Referee: Daniel Murphy
