= 2024–25 Leinster Senior Cup =

2024-25 Leinster Senior Cup
Leinster Football Association Senior Cup

Tournament details
- Country: Republic of Ireland
- Dates: 11 August 2024 – 26 October 2025

Final positions
- Champions: Dundalk
- Runners-up: St Patrick's Athletic

The 2025 PTSB Leinster Senior Cup is the 121st edition of the Leinster Football Association's primary competition. It includes all Leinster based League of Ireland clubs from the Premier Division and First Division, as well as a selection of intermediate and amateur level sides. The competition began on the weekend of 11 August 2024.

The group stage round with all League of Ireland clubs entering the competition is to be retained from the previous edition.

== Round 1 ==
| 11 August 2024 | St Anthony's | 2–1 | Valley Park United | Kilcoole, County Wicklow |
| 14:00 | | | | Stadium: Finn Park |

| 11 August 2024 | Templeogue United | 2–0 | Clonmullion | Tallaght, Dublin 24 |
| 14:00 | | | | Stadium: Tymon Park |

== Round 2 ==
| 13 September 2024 | Templeogue United | 3–3 (a.e.t.) (3–2 p) | Trim Celtic | Tallaght, Dublin 24 |
| 19:45 | Pat Sullivan 33'; Sean Ward 49'; David Fay 109' | | Adam Fox 53'; Edward Orr 68' (o.g.); Gerard Murphy 103' | Stadium: Tymon Park; Referee: Brian Hand |
| | Penalties |
| | David Frewen (penalty scored); David Fay (penalty missed); David Harvey (penalty scored); Derek Duggan (penalty scored); Brian Morrisroe (penalty missed) | | Gerard Murray (penalty missed); Brian Faulkner (penalty scored); Dean Courtney (penalty scored); TBC (penalty missed) |

| 13 September 2024 | Malahide United | 3–2 | Willow Park | Blanchardstown, Dublin 15 |
| 20:00 | TBC; TBC; TBC | | TBC; TBC | Stadium: TUD Blanchardstown; Referee: Paul Lang |

| 15 September 2024 | Wexford Bohemians | 1–1 (a.e.t.) (1–3 p) | Valley Park United | Wexford, County Wexford |
| | Dermot Flood 60' | | Gerard Coleman 50' | Stadium: The Brute Walsh Park; Referee: Sean Grant |

| 15 September 2024 | Evergreen | 1–2 | North End United | Kilkenny, County Kilkenny |
| 14:00 | TBC | | TBC; TBC | Stadium: Evergreen Park; Referee: TBC |

| 15 September 2024 | Crettyard United | 1–3 | Trinity Donaghmede | Crettyard, County Laois |
| 14:00 | Craig Comerford 46' | | Daniel Loftus 36'; Kaylyn Sweeney 37'; Jason Beasley 45+2' | Stadium: Killeen Sports Field; Referee: Nathan Bannon |

== Round 3 ==
| 25 October 2024 | Montpelier | 1–2 (a.e.t.) | Usher Celtic | Grangegorman, Dublin 7 |
| | Ciaran Horan 79' | | Gary Gannon 89'; Gary Gannon 120+1' | Stadium: TUD Grangegorman; Referee: Declan Troy |

| 25 October 2024 | Templeogue United | 0–3 | Inchicore Athletic | Tallaght, Dublin 24 |
| 19:45 | | | Kian Ekhuemelo 10'; Mark Sandford 16'; Jake Donnelly 83' | Stadium: Tymon Park; Referee: Brian Hand |

| 25 October 2024 | Trinity Donaghmede | 2–4 | North End United | Ballymun, Dublin 9 |
| 19:45 | Kevin Dunne 6'; Cian Trehy 80' | | Eoin Rhodes 7'; Niall Connolly 45'; Cian Carty McManus 60'; Robert Kane 90+2' | Stadium: Trinity Astro; Referee: Lee Duffy |

| 12 November 2024 | St Mochta's | 7–0 | Valley Park United | Clonsilla, Dublin 15 |
| 19:45 | Liam Brady 10'; Tyler Doherty 11'; Michael Scott 22'; Gareth McCaffrey 51'; Gareth McCaffrey 73' (pen.); Gareth McCaffrey 80'; Gareth McCaffrey 81' | | Andrew Brennan (red card) 73' | Stadium: Porterstown Road; Referee: Graham McCarthy |

| 25 November 2024 | Lucan United | 0–1 | Malahide United | Westmanstown, Dublin 15 |
| 19:45 | | | Stephen Cleary 15' | Stadium: Westmanstown Sports Centre; Referee: Darragh White |

== Round 4 Group Stage ==
=== Group A ===
| Team | Pld | W | D | L | GF | GA | GD | Pts |
|---|---|---|---|---|---|---|---|---|
| St Mochta's | 3 | 3 | 0 | 0 | 6 | 2 | 4 | 9 |
| Drogheda United | 3 | 2 | 0 | 1 | 6 | 2 | 4 | 6 |
| Shelbourne | 3 | 1 | 0 | 2 | 4 | 7 | –3 | 3 |
| Longford Town | 3 | 0 | 0 | 3 | 1 | 6 | –5 | 0 |

==== Matchday 1 ====
| 14 January 2025 | Shelbourne | 0–3 | Drogheda United | Clonshaugh, Dublin 9 |
| 19:45 | | | Thomas Oluwa 4'; Thomas Oluwa 16'; Thomas Oluwa 39' | Stadium: AUL; Attendance: 478; Referee: Paul Norton |

| 18 February 2025 | St Mochta's | 1–0 | Longford Town | Clonsilla, Dublin 15 |
| 18:45 | Aaron Robinson 4' | | | Stadium: Porterstown Road; Referee: Ryan Maher |

==== Matchday 2 ====
| 25 January 2025 | Drogheda United | 3–0 | Longford Town | Ratoath, County Meath |
| 15:00 | Josh Thomas 23'; Josh Thomas 35'; Bridel Bosakani 80' | | | Stadium: Ratoath Harps FC; Attendance: 100 (Est.); Referee: Oliver Moran |

| 29 January 2025 | St Mochta's | 3–2 | Shelbourne | Kilbarrack, Dublin 5 |
| 20:15 | Karl Somers 59'; Michael Scott 61'; Tyler Doherty 84' | | James Bailey 31'; James Bailey 63' | Stadium: Kilbarrack United; Referee: David Gallagher |

==== Matchday 3 ====
| 3 February 2025 | St Mochta's | 2–0 | Drogheda United | Clonsilla, Dublin 15 |
| 15:00 | Liam Brady 34'; Conor Dunne 71' | | | Stadium: Porterstown Road; Referee: Glen Geraghty |

| 4 February 2025 | Shelbourne | 2–1 | Longford Town | Clonshaugh, Dublin 9 |
| 19:40 | Tyreik Sammy 40'; Tyreik Sammy 53' | | James Roche 18' (o.g.) | Stadium: AUL; Referee: Aaron O'Dowd |

=== Group B ===
| Team | Pld | W | D | L | GF | GA | GD | Pts |
|---|---|---|---|---|---|---|---|---|
| Dundalk | 3 | 2 | 0 | 1 | 9 | 2 | 7 | 6 |
| Usher Celtic | 3 | 2 | 0 | 1 | 8 | 5 | 3 | 6 |
| Shamrock Rovers | 3 | 2 | 0 | 1 | 7 | 6 | 1 | 6 |
| Malahide United | 3 | 0 | 0 | 3 | 2 | 13 | –11 | 0 |

==== Matchday 1 ====
| 21 February 2025 | Usher Celtic | 6–0 | Malahide United | Grangegorman, Dublin 7 |
| 19:30 | Jordan Buckley 38'; Gary Gannon 56'; Jordan Buckley 62'; David White 77'; Graham Curran 80'; Brian Wokocha 87' | | | Stadium: TUD Grangegorman; Referee: David Gallagher |

| 7 February 2025 | Shamrock Rovers | 0–4 | Dundalk | Citywest, Dublin 24 |
| 20:00 | | | TJ Molloy 13'; Eoin Kenny 16'; Daryl Horgan 29'; Leo Gaxha 53' | Stadium: Roadstone Academy; Referee: Neil Doyle |

==== Matchday 2 ====
| 20 January 2025 | Dundalk | 1–2 | Usher Celtic | Dundalk, County Louth |
| 19:45 | Eoin Kenny 62' | | Graham Curran 70' (pen.); Gary Gannon 90' | Stadium: Oriel Park; Attendance: 1,021; Referee: Mark Moynihan |

| 3 February 2025 | Malahide United | 2–3 | Shamrock Rovers | Malahide, County Dublin |
| 13:00 | Todd Bazunu 36' (o.g.); Karl Sheppard 70' | | Archibald Quinn 10'; Archibald Quinn 57' (pen.); Goodness Ogbonna 60' | Stadium: Gannon Park; Referee: Oliver Moran |

==== Matchday 3 ====
| 17 January 2025 | Dundalk | 4–0 | Malahide United | Dundalk, County Louth |
| 19:45 | Daryl Horgan 11'; Dean Ebbe 38'; Aodh Dervin 52'; Aidan Russell Vargas (penalty missed) 90+1'; Aidan Russell Vargas 90+1' | | | Stadium: Oriel Park; Attendance: 1,219; Referee: David Dunne |

| 17 January 2025 | Usher Celtic | 0–4 | Shamrock Rovers | Grangegorman, Dublin 7 |
| 19:30 | | | Richard Vodo 7'; Charles Akimrintoyo 11'; Charles Akimrintoyo 14'; Ajibola Oluwabiyi 33' | Stadium: TUD Grangegorman; Referee: Aaron O'Dowd |

=== Group C ===
| Team | Pld | W | D | L | GF | GA | GD | Pts |
|---|---|---|---|---|---|---|---|---|
| St Patrick's Athletic | 3 | 2 | 1 | 0 | 7 | 4 | 3 | 7 |
| Athlone Town | 3 | 1 | 2 | 0 | 8 | 5 | 3 | 5 |
| Bray Wanderers | 2 | 0 | 1 | 1 | 2 | 3 | –1 | 1 |
| Inchicore Athletic | 2 | 0 | 0 | 2 | 1 | 6 | –5 | 0 |

==== Matchday 1 ====
| 24 January 2025 | Athlone Town | 3–3 | St Patrick's Athletic | Athlone, County Westmeath |
| 19:30 | Dean Williams 24'; Dean Williams 56' (pen.); Ben Feeney 80' | Report | Brandon Kavanagh 8'; Brandon Kavanagh 33'; Brandon Kavanagh 57' | Stadium: Athlone Town Stadium; Attendance: 0 (Behind closed doors); Referee: Aaron O'Dowd |
Note: Behind closed doors due to Storm Éowyn

| Bray Wanderers | Cancelled | Inchicore Athletic | Bray, County Wicklow |
| | | | Stadium: Carlisle Grounds |
Note: Fixture was cancelled as the result became inconsequential to qualification to the Quarter Finals.

==== Matchday 2 ====
| 18 January 2025 | Inchicore Athletic | 0–2 | St Patrick's Athletic | Clondalkin, Dublin 22 |
| 14:00 | | Report | Simon Power 45+1'; Aidan Keena 61' | Stadium: Capco Park; Attendance: 572; Referee: Gavin Colfer |

| 24 March 2025 | Athlone Town | 1–1 | Bray Wanderers | Athlone, County Westmeath |
| 19:45 | Kyle Robinson 11' | | Benjamin Fagbemi 69' | Stadium: Athlone Town Stadium; Referee: Declan Toland |

==== Matchday 3 ====
| 3 February 2025 | Inchicore Athletic | 1–4 | Athlone Town | Inchicore, Dublin 8 |
| 15:00 | Sean Kenny 2' | | Kyle Robinson 7'; Kyle Robinson 18'; Kyle Robinson 37'; Aaron Connolly 54' | Stadium: Bernard Curtis Park; Referee: David Dunne |

| 21 January 2025 | St Patrick's Athletic | 2–1 | Bray Wanderers | Inchicore, Dublin 8 |
| 19:45 | Kian Leavy 32'; Barry Baggley 36'; Luke Turner (red card) 42' | Report | Cian Curtis (penalty missed) 42'; Paul Murphy 44' | Stadium: Richmond Park; Attendance: 900 (Est.); Referee: Rob Harvey |

=== Group D ===
| Team | Pld | W | D | L | GF | GA | GD | Pts |
|---|---|---|---|---|---|---|---|---|
| Bohemians | 3 | 2 | 0 | 1 | 10 | 5 | 5 | 6 |
| North End United | 3 | 2 | 0 | 1 | 5 | 4 | 1 | 6 |
| UCD | 3 | 2 | 0 | 1 | 5 | 6 | –1 | 6 |
| Wexford | 3 | 0 | 0 | 3 | 4 | 9 | –5 | 0 |

==== Matchday 1 ====
| 18 January 2025 | North End United | 2–1 | Wexford | Wexford Town, County Wexford |
| 14:00 | Darragh Byrne Moloney 51'; John Peare 90+1' | | Brian Maher 77' | Stadium: Hollygrove; Attendance: 319; Referee: Robert Dowling |

| 21 January 2025 | UCD | 1–4 | Bohemians | Belfield, Dublin 4 |
| 19:00 | Éanna Clancy 13' | | Liam Smith 29'; Rhys Brennan 67'; Ross Tierney (penalty missed) 87'; Ross Tierney 89'; Ross Tierney 90+1' | Stadium: UCD Bowl; Attendance: 250; Referee: Daniel Murphy |

==== Matchday 2 ====
| 26 January 2025 | North End United | 1–0 | Bohemians | Wexford Town, County Wexford |
| 14:00 | Eoin Rhodes 6' | | | Stadium: Wexford CBS; Attendance: 150; Referee: David Dunne |

| 27 January 2025 | UCD | 1–0 | Wexford | Belfield, Dublin 4 |
| 19:00 | Ronan Finn 30' (pen.) | | | Stadium: UCD Bowl; Attendance: 65; Referee: Neil Doyle |

==== Matchday 3 ====
| 1 February 2025 | North End United | 2–3 | UCD | Wexford Town, County Wexford |
| 12:00 | Paul Murphy 87'; Gary Delaney 90+1' | | Marven Chan 21'; Marven Chan 61'; G.Lavin 69' | Stadium: Hollygrove; Referee: Patrick Sinnott |

| 3 February 2025 | Wexford | 3–6 | Bohemians | Coolock, Dublin 17 |
| 15:00 | Mikie Rowe 21'; Declan Osagie 27' (o.g.); Darragh Livingston 49' | | Tom Clarke 2'; Ryan Ritchie 31'; Shane Tracey 37'; Markuss Strods 43'; Markuss Strods 78'; Hugh Smith 81' | Stadium: Oscar Traynor Centre; Attendance: 120; Referee: John Sconnie Walsh |

== Quarter Final ==
The draw for the quarter final was made on 4 March 2025.

| 25 March 2025 | Dundalk | w/o¹ | North End United | Dundalk, County Louth |
| 19:45 | | | | Stadium: Oriel Park; Referee: Alan Patchell |
Note: ¹Dundalk were awarded a walkover as North End United could not field a team.

| 19 April 2025 | Bohemians | 2–0 | Usher Celtic | Coolock, Dublin 17 |
| 14:00 | Markus Strods 38'; Ryan Ritchie (penalty missed) 45+2'; Sebastian Mohan 59' | | | Stadium: Oscar Traynor Centre; Referee: Daryl Carolyn |

| 21 July 2025 | St Mochta's | 2–0 | Athlone Town | Clonshaugh, Dublin 9 |
| 19:45 | Daragh Owens 29'; Michael Scott 70' | | | Stadium: AUL Complex; Referee: Robert Dowling |

| 5 September 2025 | St Patrick's Athletic | 2–0 | Drogheda United | Inchicore, Dublin 8 |
| 19:00 | Conor Carty 14'; Conor Carty 60' | Report | | Stadium: Richmond Park; Attendance: 950 (Est.); Referee: Mark Houlihan |

== Semi Final ==
| Dundalk | w/o¹ | Bohemians | Dundalk, County Louth |
| | | | Stadium: Oriel Park |
Note: ¹Dundalk were awarded a walkover as Bohemians could not agree a date for the fixture to take place

| 10 October 2025 | St Patrick's Athletic | 4–0 | St Mochta's | Inchicore, Dublin 8 |
| 19:00 | Chris Forrester 18'; Anthony Breslin 41'; Michael Scott 66' (o.g.); Conor Carty 76' | Report | | Stadium: Richmond Park; Attendance: 950 (Est.); Referee: Daniel Murphy |

== Final ==
| 26 October 2025 | St Patrick's Athletic | 1–2 | Dundalk | Inchicore, Dublin 8 |
| 18:00 | Aidan Keena 27' | Report | Harry Groome 5'; Rohan Vaughan 11' | Stadium: Richmond Park; Attendance: 600 (Est.); Referee: Oliver Moran |
