= Collie O'Neill =

Irish football coach

Personal information
- Full name: Collie O'Neill
- Place of birth: Drogheda, County Louth, Ireland
- Position

Youth career
- Home Farm FC, Drogheda Boys

Senior career*
| Years | Team | Apps | (Gls) |
| 2001–2005 | St Mochtas FC | | |
| 2005–2006 | Dublin City (player–coach) | | |

Managerial career
- 2005–2006: Dublin City (first-team coach)
- 2006–2007: Dundalk (assistant coach)
- 2007-2010: Shelbourne (assistant → caretaker manager)
- 2011–2014: UCD (assistant manager)
- 2015–2019: UCD (manager)
- 2021: Cabinteely (technical coach)
- 2022: Bray Wanderers (technical coach)
- 2023–2025: Shamrock Rovers Women (Head Coach)
- * Club domestic league appearances and goals

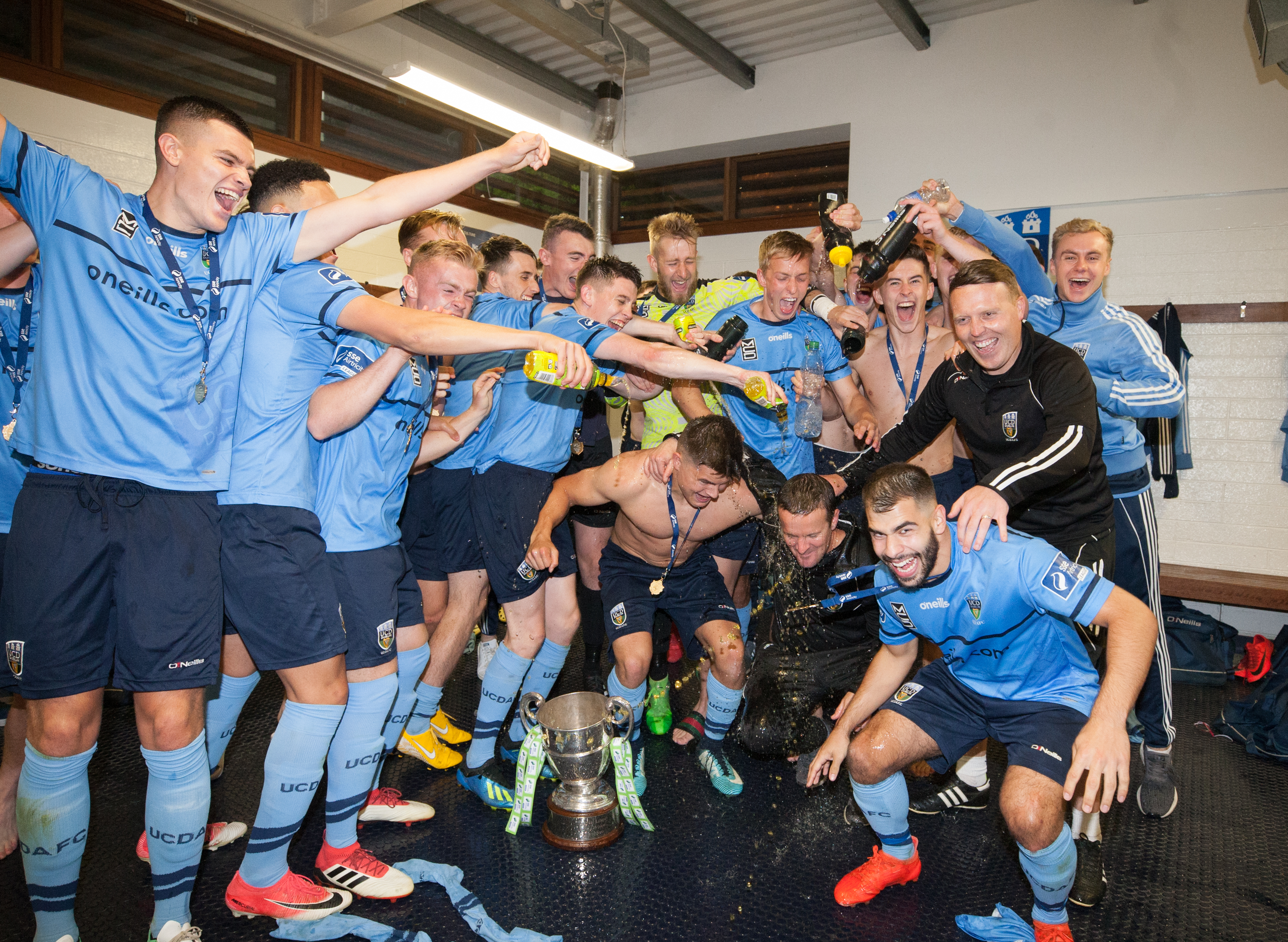
UCD celebrate league title win

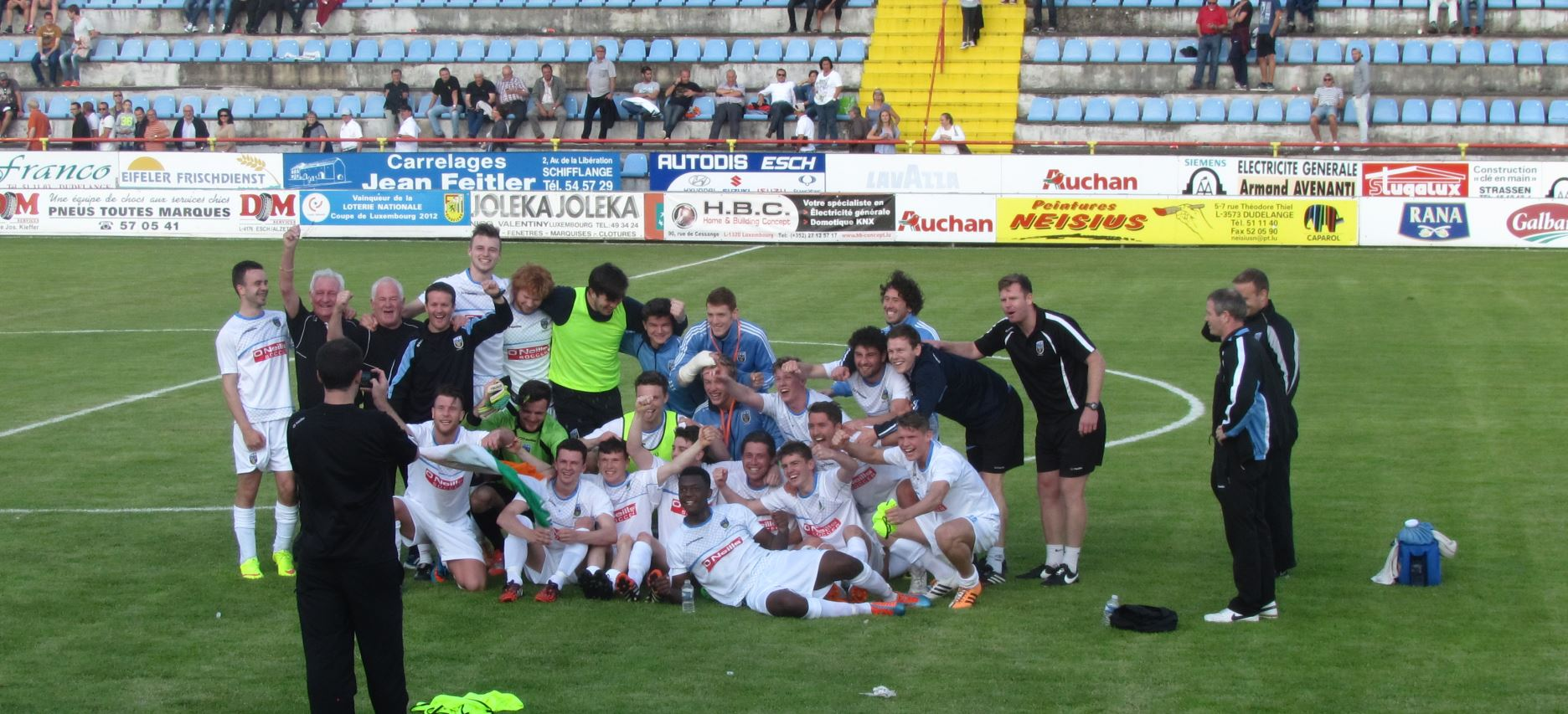
UCD Team after progressing in Europa League

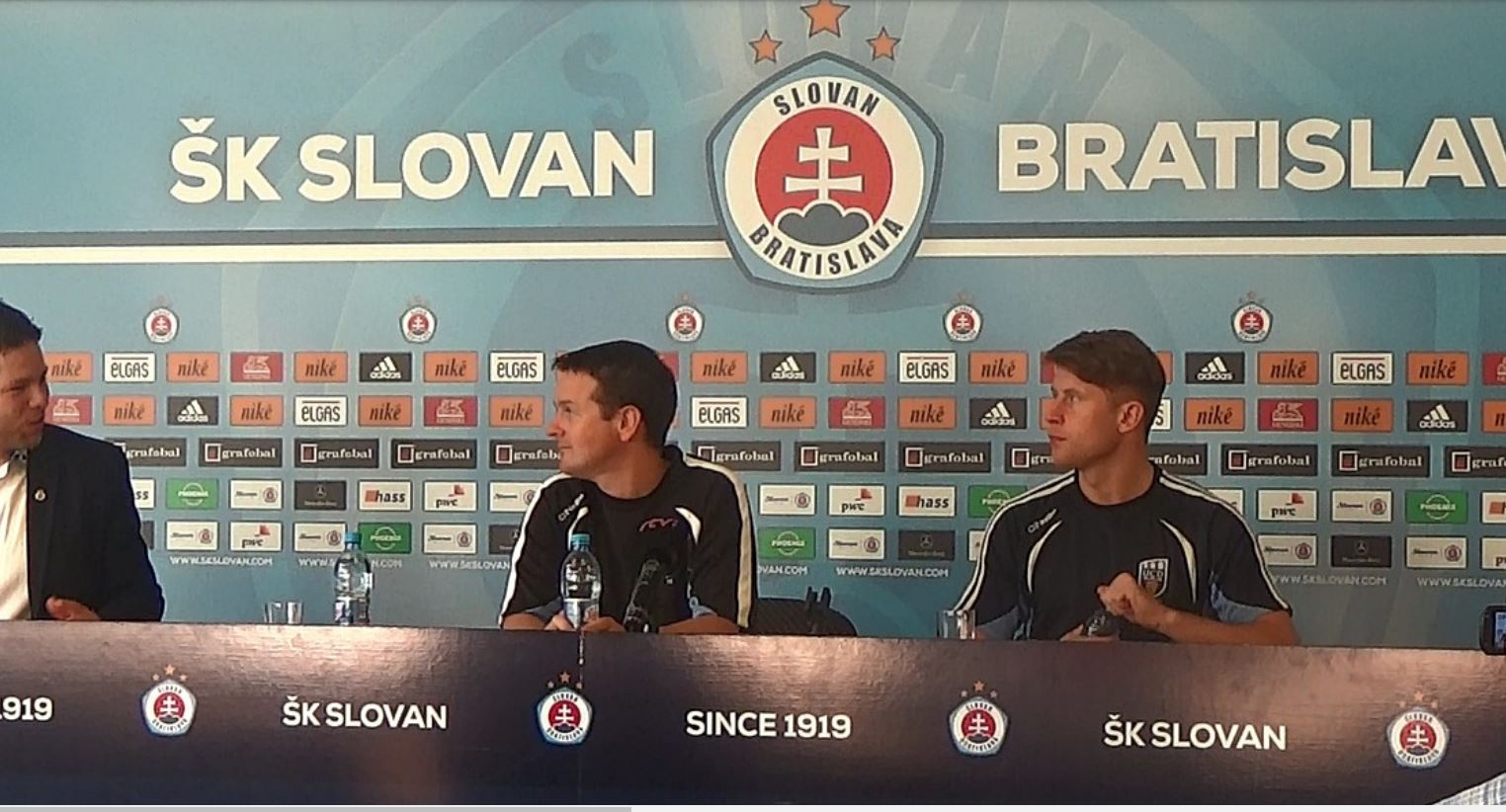
Press conference before Slovan Bratislava game

Colin "Collie" O'Neill is an Irish football manager and coach from Drogheda, County Louth. He holds a UEFA Pro Licence, which he received in August 2018, and is best known for managing UCD AFC in the League of Ireland, where he won the First Division title in 2018 and was named PFAI First Division Manager of the Year.

== Early coaching career ==
=== Dublin City (2005–2006) ===
O'Neill began his coaching career at Dublin City FC under manager Dermot Keely. In 2005, Dublin City won the League of Ireland First Division and earned promotion to the Premier Division after defeating Shamrock Rovers in the promotion/relegation playoff. The club folded midway through the 2006 Premier Division season due to financial difficulties.

=== Dundalk (2006–2007) ===
Following Dublin City's collapse, O'Neill joined Dundalk FC as part of the backroom staff under manager John Gill. Dundalk won the promotion playoff against Waterford United, but the FAI denied promotion due to league restructuring. O'Neill departed the club in February 2007.

=== Shelbourne (2007–2010) ===
In 2007, O'Neill joined Shelbourne FC as assistant manager under Dermot Keely. The club had been relegated to the First Division due to financial irregularities and Keely assembled a squad at short notice for the 2007 season.

== Managerial career ==
=== UCD (2011–2019) ===
O'Neill joined UCD as assistant manager in 2011 under Martin Russell. He served as assistant under Russell (2011–2014) and then under Aaron Callaghan for the 2014 season. Following UCD's relegation from the Premier Division in 2014, O'Neill was appointed manager in December 2014.

In 2015, UCD qualified for the UEFA Europa League through the UEFA Respect Fair Play ranking, entering as a First Division club. In the first qualifying round, UCD defeated F91 Dudelange of Luxembourg on away goals, becoming the first Irish second-tier club to win a European tie. They were eliminated in the next round by ŠK Slovan Bratislava.

In 2018, O'Neill led UCD to the First Division title and promotion back to the Premier Division. He was named PFAI First Division Manager of the Year for the 2018 season.

O'Neill was noted for his emphasis on youth development and team cohesion within UCD's all-student squad model. In a 2018 interview, he stated: "The club is like a family... They're buddies, they look after each other, and mind each other on and off the field."

Several players who developed under O'Neill at UCD went on to play at higher levels, including Liam Scales, Georgie Kelly, Gary O'Neill, and Greg Sloggett. Scales, who later signed for Celtic, credited O'Neill's influence on his development: "Collie at UCD helped me a lot, he put a lot of faith in me as a young player. I played a lot there, I played a lot of senior games which a lot of young lads don't really get the chance to do."

O'Neill departed UCD in August 2019 after an eight-year association with the club.

=== Cabinteely and Bray Wanderers (2021–2022) ===
O'Neill served as technical coach at Cabinteely (2021) and Bray Wanderers (2022), working under manager Pat Devlin.

=== Shamrock Rovers Women (2023–2025) ===
In October 2022, O'Neill was appointed head coach of Shamrock Rovers Women ahead of their entry into the Women's National League. In their debut 2023 season, Rovers finished third in the Women's Premier Division.

O'Neill resigned as head coach in July 2025.

== Honours ==
=== Managerial ===
UCD

- League of Ireland First Division: 2018

=== Individual ===
- PFAI First Division Manager of the Year: 2018
