= Nattestad =

Nattestad is a surname. Notable people with the surname include:

- Ole Knudsen Nattestad (1807–1886), Norwegian-American leader and pioneer immigrant settler
- Sonni Nattestad (born 1994), Faroese footballer
