= 2021 President of Ireland's Cup =

- Event: President's Cup
Shamrock Rovers	Dundalk
1	1
- Dundalk won 4–3 on penalties
- Date: 12 March 2021
- Venue: Tallaght Stadium, Tallaght
- Referee: Damien McGrath
- Attendance: 0

The 2021 President's Cup was the seventh President's Cup contested for. The match was played on 12 March between the champions of the 2020 League of Ireland Premier Division and 2020 FAI Cup, Shamrock Rovers and Dundalk. The match finished 1–1 after 90 minutes and was decided by a penalty shootout which Dundalk won 4–3 with Albanian goalkeeper Alessio Abibi saving Roberto Lopes penalty to win the game for Dundalk on his competitive debut.

== Match ==
=== Summary ===
Sonni Nattestad opened the scoring for Dundalk in the 42nd minute with a downward header after a corner from the left. Five minutes later it was 1-1 when Liam Scales controlled a ball into the penalty area with his right foot, then his left to create space before shooting low to the right corner of the net with his left foot. Sonni Nattestad was sent-off in the 59th minute following a challenge on Graham Burke. The game went to penalties with Dundalk goalkeeper Alessio Abibi diving to his left to save the decisive penalty from Roberto Lopes to win the game 4–3.

=== Details ===
12 March 2021
19:45 GMT

Shamrock Rovers	1–1	Dundalk
Danny Mandroiu (yellow card) 22'; Liam Scales 47'; Chris McCann (yellow card) 59'; Joey O'Brien (yellow card) 60'	Report	Raivis Jurkovskis (yellow card) 26'; Daniel Cleary (yellow card) 32'; Sonni Nattestad 42'; Sonni Nattestad (red card) 59'; Chris Shields (yellow card) 60'
Penalties
Dylan Watts (penalty scored); Aaron Greene (penalty scored); Joey O'Brien (penalty scored); Rory Gaffney (penalty missed); Graham Burke (penalty missed); Roberto Lopes (penalty missed)	3–4	(penalty scored) Patrick Hoban; (penalty missed) Greg Sloggett; (penalty scored) Daniel Cleary; (penalty scored) Chris Shields; (penalty missed) Andy Boyle; (penalty scored) Darragh Leahy

Tallaght Stadium
Attendance: 0
Referee: Damien McGrath

Shamrock Rovers	Dundalk

GK	1	(Northern Ireland) Alan Mannus
DF	2	(Republic of Ireland) Sean Gannon
DF	28	(Republic of Ireland) Joey O'Brien	(yellow card) 60'
DF	4	(Cape Verde) Roberto Lopes
DF	3	(Republic of Ireland) Seán Hoare
DF	15	(Republic of Ireland) Liam Scales	47'
MF	10	(Republic of Ireland) Graham Burke
MF	8	(Republic of Ireland) Ronan Finn (c)	(substituted off) 76'
MF	26	(Republic of Ireland) Chris McCann	(yellow card) 59'
MF	14	(Republic of Ireland) Danny Mandroiu	(yellow card) 22'	(substituted off) 65'
FW	20	(Republic of Ireland) Rory Gaffney
Substitutes:
GK	25	(Germany) Leon Pöhls
DF	21	(Republic of Ireland) Adam Wells
DF	32	(Republic of Ireland) Cole Omorehiomwan
DF	24	(Republic of Ireland) Max Murphy
MF	7	(Republic of Ireland) Dylan Watts	(substituted in) 76'
MF	16	(Republic of Ireland) Gary O'Neill
FW	9	(Republic of Ireland) Aaron Greene	(substituted in) 65'
FW	19	(Republic of Ireland) Dean Williams
Manager:
(Republic of Ireland) Stephen Bradley				(yellow card) 60'

GK	1	(Albania) Alessio Abibi
DF	13	(Latvia) Raivis Jurkovskis
DF	21	(Republic of Ireland) Daniel Cleary	(yellow card) 32'
DF	6	(Faroe Islands) Sonni Nattestad	42'	(red card) 59'
DF	4	(Republic of Ireland) Andy Boyle
DF	15	(Republic of Ireland) Darragh Leahy
MF	11	(Republic of Ireland) Patrick McEleney	(substituted off) 65'
MF	5	(Republic of Ireland) Chris Shields (c)	(yellow card) 60'
MF	8	(Scotland) Sam Stanton
MF	20	(England) Junior Ogedi-Uzokwe	(substituted off) 82'
FW	29	(Republic of Ireland) David McMillan	(substituted off) 50'
Substitutes:
GK	14	(Scotland) Peter Cherrie
DF	23	(Northern Ireland) Cameron Dummigan	(substituted in) 82'
DF	24	(Republic of Ireland) Mayowa Animasahun
MF	10	(Republic of Ireland) Greg Sloggett	(substituted in) 65'
MF	25	(Republic of Ireland) Val Adedokun
MF	28	(Republic of Ireland) Ryan O'Kane
MF	90	(United States) Jesús Pérez
FW	9	(Republic of Ireland) Patrick Hoban	(substituted in) 50'
Manager:
(Republic of Ireland) Shane Keegan

== See also ==
- 2021 League of Ireland Premier Division
- 2021 FAI Cup
- 2021 Dundalk F.C. season
