= 2023 Dundalk F.C. season =

Irish football season

Dundalk
2023 season
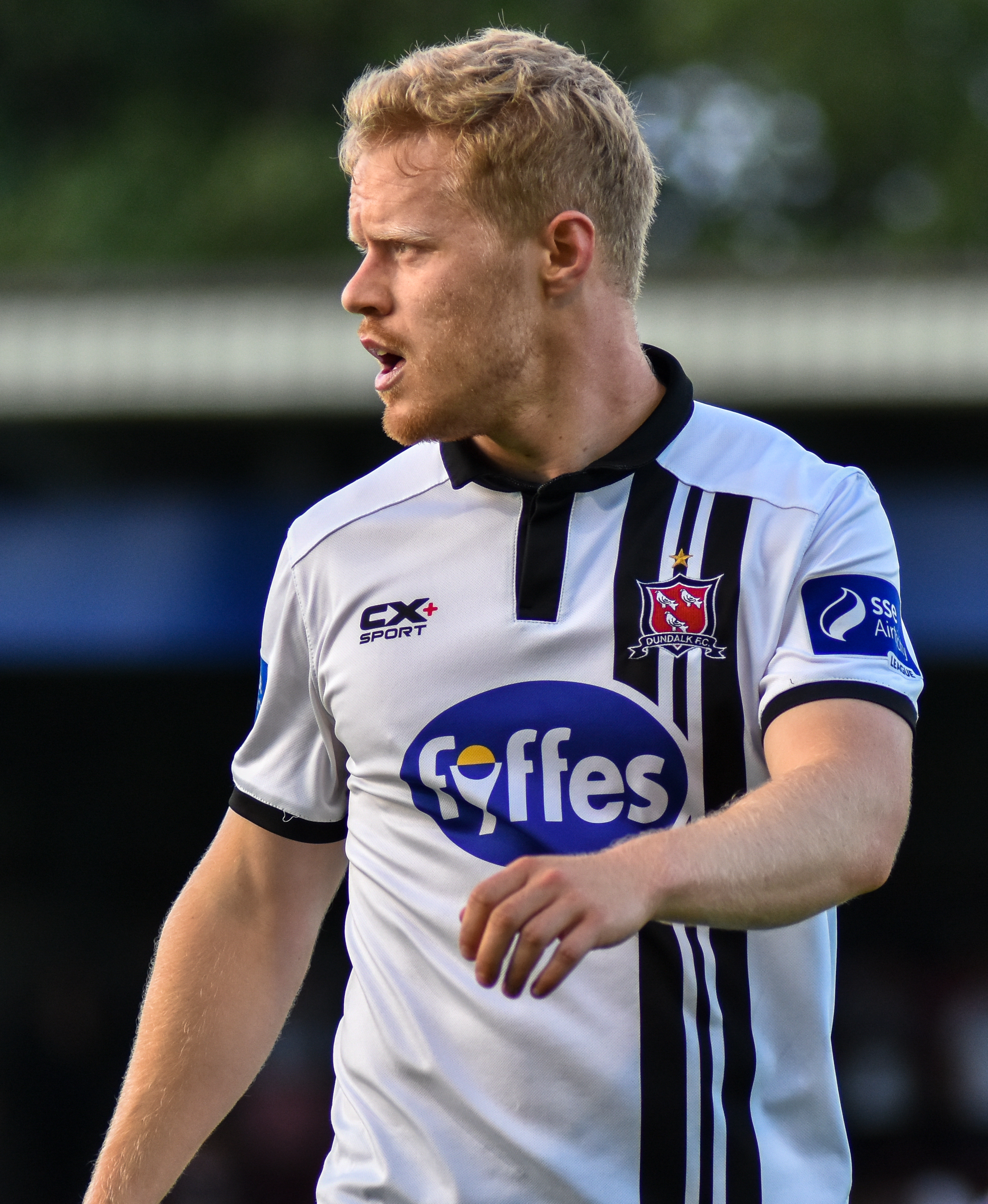
- Daryl Horgan, re-signed by the club in August 2023
- Chairman: Sean O'Connor
- Head coach: Stephen O'Donnell
- Stadium: Oriel Park
- League of Ireland: 5th
- FAI Cup: Quarter-final
- Leinster Senior Cup: Fourth round
- UEFA Europa Conference League: Second qualifying round
- Top goalscorer: League: Patrick Hoban (14); All: Patrick Hoban (15)
- Highest home attendance: 3,761 v Shamrock Rovers, 31 March 2023
Home colours	Away colours	Third colours

Dundalk entered the 2023 season having finished in third place in the league the previous season. 2023 was Dundalk's 15th consecutive season in the top tier of Irish football, their 88th in all, and their 97th in the League of Ireland. The club celebrated the 120th anniversary of its founding in September 2023. They entered the 2023–24 UEFA Europa Conference League at the first qualifying round stage in what was their 26th European campaign.

Stephen O'Donnell was the club's head coach going into the new term, his second season in charge.

== Season summary ==
The league season consisting of 36 matches (four series of nine matches) began on 17 February 2023. In Round 22 away to Drogheda United, Pat Hoban scored his 143rd and 144th goals for the club to take him past Joey Donnelly's record of 142 set in 1946. He ended the season with 15 goals, to reach a total of 150 goals for the club. Having briefly entertained a title challenge following a home win over champions Shamrock Rovers in round 24, a poor run subsequently saw the club finish in 5th position and outside the European qualification places.

In the FAI Cup, they reached the quarter-final before losing away to First Division Galway United, 4–0 in a performance described as "embarrassing" by O'Donnell.

In the Leinster Senior Cup, they were initially ejected from the tournament for failing to fulfil a fourth-round tie against Shelbourne. That decision was overturned on appeal by the club but they exited the tournament anyway, losing the tie 4–0.

In the Europa Conference League, Dundalk reached the second qualifying round with a 3–1 aggregate win over Bruno's Magpies but were knocked out by KA, 5–3 on aggregate. Andy Boyle took the club record for appearances in Europe, playing his 41st match in the second leg against KA.

=== First-Team Squad (2023) ===
Sources: Note: Substitute appearances in brackets

No.	Name	DOB	Pos.	Debut	League		FAI Cup		Europe		Leinster Cup		Totals	
No.	Name	DOB	Pos.	Debut	Apps	Goals	Apps	Goals	Apps	Goals	Apps	Goals	Apps	Goals
1	(Wales) Nathan Shepperd	10 September 2000	GK	2022	36	0	3	0	4	0	0	0	43	0
2	(England) Archie Davies	7 October 1998	DF	2023	35	0	3	0	4	0	1	0	43	0
3	(Republic of Ireland) Darragh Leahy	15 April 1998	DF	2020	20 (4)	0	2	0	4	0	0	0	30	0
4	(Republic of Ireland) Andy Boyle	7 March 1991	DF	2013	17 (1)	1	1	0	4	0	0	0	23	1
5	(Gibraltar) Louie Annesley	3 May 2000	DF	2023	14	2	1	0	3	0	0	0	18	2
6	(England) Alfie Lewis	28 September 1999	MF	2022	11 (14)	0	1 (1)	0	0 (1)	0	1	0	29	0
7	(Republic of Ireland) Daniel Kelly	21 May 1996	MF	2019	15 (12)	8	2 (1)	0	4	1	0	0	34	9
8	(Republic of Ireland) Robbie Benson	7 May 1992	MF	2016	9 (5)	1	0 (1)	0	0	0	1	0	16	1
9	(Republic of Ireland) Patrick Hoban	28 July 1991	FW	2013	24 (10)	14	1 (1)	0	4	1	0	0	40	15
10	(Republic of Ireland) Greg Sloggett	3 July 1996	MF	2020	26 (1)	0	0 (2)	0	3 (1)	1	0	0	33	1
11	(Republic of Ireland) John Martin	5 January 1999	MF	2022	15 (17)	6	2	0	1 (3)	2	1	0	39	8
13	(Scotland) Peter Cherrie	1 October 1983	GK	2009	0	0	0	0	0	0	1	0	1	0
14	(Scotland) Cameron Elliott	27 May 1999	FW	2023	8 (15)	1	0 (2)	0	0 (2)	0	1	0	28	1
15	(Republic of Ireland) Daryl Horgan (Note: signed 2 August 2023 ahead of Round 26)	10 August 1992	FW	2014	11	3	2	1	0	0	0	0	13	4
16	(England) Hayden Muller	7 February 2002	DF	2023	27 (6)	1	2	1	1	0	1	0	37	2
17	(Republic of Ireland) Keith Ward	12 October 1990	MF	2011	5 (15)	1	0	0	0	0	1	0	21	1
18	(Republic of Ireland) Robert McCourt	6 April 1998	DF	2022	8 (5)	0	2 (1)	0	1	0	1	0	18	0
19	(Scotland) Darren Brownlie (Note: signed 6 July 2023 ahead of Round 25)	10 April 1994	DF	2023	7	0	2 (1)	0	0 (1)	0	0	0	11	0
20	(Finland) Johannes Yli-Kokko (Note: on season-long loan from HJK)	24 August 2001	MF	2023	23 (5)	3	3	0	3 (1)	0	0	0	35	3
21	(Republic of Ireland) Paul Doyle	10 April 1998	MF	2022	11 (14)	3	1	0	1 (1)	0	0	0	28	3
22	(England) Wasiri Williams (Note: on loan from Swansea City until Round 21)	1 April 2000	DF	2023	10 (1)	0	0	0	0	0	1	0	12	0
22	(England) Sam Durrant (Note: signed 2 August 2023 ahead of Round 26)	16 February 2002	Winger	2023	4 (6)	2	1 (1)	0	0	0	0	0	12	2
23	(Republic of Ireland) John Mountney	22 February 1993	MF	2012	0	0	0	0	0	0	0	0	0	0
27	(England) Connor Malley	20 March 2000	MF	2023	26 (6)	3	2 (1)	0	4	0	0	0	39	3
28	(Republic of Ireland) Ryan O'Kane	16 August 2003	Winger	2021	17 (17)	3	2 (1)	0	3 (1)	0	1	0	42	3
29	(Republic of Ireland) Senan Mullen	28 February 2005	MF	2023	2 (2)	0	0	0	0	0	0	0	4	0
77	(England) Rayhaan Tulloch (Note: on loan from West Brom until Round 24)	20 January 2001	Winger	2023	14 (5)	5	0	0	0	0	0	0	19	5

== Competitions ==
Win Draw Loss

=== Premier Division ===
17 February 2023 Round 1	Dundalk	1–1	U.C.D.	Oriel Park
19:45	John Martin 34'	Report	Behan 78'	Attendance: 3,124; Referee: Arnold Hunter

24 February 2023 Round 2	Bohemians	2–1	Dundalk	Phibsborough, Dublin
19:45	Flores 45'; McDaid 71'	Report	Johannes Yli-Kokko 88'	Stadium: Dalymount Park; Attendance: 4,443; Referee: Rob Harvey

3 March 2023 Round 3	Dundalk	5–0	St Patrick's Athletic	Oriel Park
19:45	Patrick Hoban 6'; Louie Annesley 15'; Rayhaan Tulloch 51'; Daniel Kelly 53'; Conor Malley 84'	Report		Attendance: 3,487; Referee: Paul McLaughlin

6 March 2023 Round 4	Dundalk	2–1	Shelbourne	Oriel Park
19:45	Rayhaan Tulloch 47'; Andy Boyle 68'	Report	Wilson 15'	Attendance: 2,766; Referee: Damien MacGraith

10 March 2023 Round 5	Derry City	0–0	Dundalk	Derry
19:45		Report		Stadium: Ryan McBride Brandywell Stadium; Attendance: Unreported; Referee: Rob Hennessy

16 March 2023 Round 6	Drogheda United	0–1	Dundalk	Drogheda
19:45		Report	Conor Malley 65'	Stadium: Weavers Park; Attendance: 2,193; Referee: Paul McLaughlin

31 March 2023 Round 7	Dundalk	0–4	Shamrock Rovers	Oriel Park
19:45	Robbie Benson (red card) 35'	Report	Gaffney 22'; Grace 37'; Kenny 71'; Burke 76'	Attendance: 3,761; Referee: Arnold Hunter

7 April 2023 Round 8	Dundalk	1–2	Sligo Rovers	Oriel Park
19:45	Rayhaan Tulloch 44'	Report	Mata 17'; Radosavljevic 90'	Attendance: 2,457; Referee: Damien McGraith

10 April 2023 Round 9	Cork City	1–0	Dundalk	Cork
17:00	Murphy 38'	Report		Stadium: Turners Cross; Attendance: 3,674; Referee: Sean Grant

16 April 2023 Round 10	Dundalk	2–2	Derry City	Oriel Park
15:00	Robbie Benson 71'; Johannes Yli-Kokko 72'; Wasiri Williams (red card) 86'	Report	Doherty 44'; Kavanagh 44'	Attendance: 2,377; Referee: Rob Hennessy

21 April 2023 Round 11	Shelbourne	1–1	Dundalk	Drumcondra, Dublin
19:45	Farrell (red card) 9'; Moylan 55' (pen.)	Report	Rayhaan Tulloch 81'	Stadium: Tolka Park; Attendance: 2,873; Referee: Damien McGraith

28 April 2023 Round 12	Dundalk	3–2	Drogheda United	Drogheda
19:45	Ryan O'Kane 23'; Pat Hoban 29'; John Martin 90'	Report	Deegan (red card) 50'; Rooney 54'; Draper 71'	Stadium: Oriel Park; Attendance: 2,825; Referee: Neil Doyle

1 May 2023 Round 13	U.C.D.	0–2	Dundalk	Dún Laoghaire–Rathdown
17:00		Report	John Martin 35'; Ryan O'Kane 90'	Stadium: UCD Bowl; Attendance: 759; Referee: Sean Grant

6 May 2023 Round 14	Sligo Rovers	0–1	Dundalk	Sligo
19:45		Report	Keith Ward 85'	Stadium: The Showgrounds; Attendance: 2,643; Referee: Paul McLaughlin

12 May 2023 Round 15	Dundalk	2–1	Cork City	Oriel Park
19:45	Cameron Elliott 90'; Patrick Hoban 90'	Report	Owolabi 18' Honohan (red card) 86'; Coleman (red card) 90'	Attendance: 2,389; Referee: Damien McGraith

15 May 2023 Round 16	Derry City	3–0	Dundalk	Derry
19:45	McEneff 20'; Kavanagh 61'; Duffy 83'	Report		Stadium: Ryan McBride Brandywell Stadium; Attendance: Unreported; Referee: Rob Harvey

19 May 2023 Round 17	Dundalk	2–2	Bohemians	Oriel Park
19:45	Patrick Hoban 3'; Talbot (o.g.) 29'	Report	Nowak 76'; Coote 87'	Attendance: 2,473; Referee: Neil Doyle

26 May 2023 Round 18	St Patrick's Athletic	2–1	Dundalk	Inchicore, Dublin
19:45	Doyle 31'; Mulraney (red card) 54'; Carty 81'	Report	Rayhaan Tulloch 48'	Stadium: Richmond Park; Attendance: 4,089; Referee: Ray Matthews

2 June 2023 Round 19	Shamrock Rovers	2–0	Dundalk	Tallaght, Dublin
19:45	Greene 34', 61'; Finn (red card) 49'	Report		Stadium: Tallaght Stadium; Attendance: 5,602; Referee: Paul McLaughlin

5 June 2023 Round 20	Dundalk	4–1	U.C.D.	Oriel Park
19:45	Patrick Hoban 23', 53', 69'; Daniel Kelly 41'	Report	Doyle 7'	Attendance: 1,762; Referee: Damien McGraith

9 June 2023 Round 21	Cork City	1–2	Dundalk	Cork
19:45	Annesley 20' (o.g.)	Report	Ryan O'Kane 44'; John Martin 85'	Stadium: Turners Cross; Attendance: 3,815; Referee: Rob Hennessey

23 June 2023 Round 22	Drogheda United	1–2	Dundalk	Drogheda
19:45	Foley 9'; Draper (red card) 81'	Report	Patrick Hoban 79', 81'	Stadium: Weavers Park; Attendance: 2,278; Referee: Rob Harvey

26 June 2023 Round 23	Dundalk	1–1	St Patrick's Athletic	Oriel Park
19:45	Rayhaan Tulloch (red card) 55'; Daniel Kelly 86'	Report	Carty 31'	Attendance: 2,371; Referee: Damien McGraith

30 June 2023 Round 24	Dundalk	2–0	Shamrock Rovers	Oriel Park
19:45	Louie Annesley 75'; Patrick Hoban 77'	Report		Attendance: 3,156; Referee: Paul McLaughlin

7 July 2023 Round 25	Bohemians	3–2	Dundalk	Phibsborough, Dublin
19:45	McManus 15'; O’Sullivan 81'; Afolabi 83'	Report	Johannes Yli-Kokko 23'; Conor Malley 38'	Stadium: Dalymount Park; Attendance: 4,328; Referee: Rob Hennessy

6 August 2023 Round 26	Dundalk	1–1	Shelbourne	Oriel Park
17:00	John Martin 39'	Report	Wood 83'	Attendance: 2,318; Referee: Kevin O'Sullivan

11 August 2023 Round 27	Dundalk	1–0	Sligo Rovers	Oriel Park
19:45	Daniel Kelly 11'	Report		Attendance: 1,947; Referee: Adriano Reale

25 August 2023 Round 28	Shamrock Rovers	1–0	Dundalk	Tallaght, Dublin
19:45	Lopes 62'			Stadium: Tallaght Stadium; Attendance: 6,021; Referee: Neil Doyle

1 September 2023 Round 29	Dundalk	1–3	Derry City	Oriel Park
19:45	Patrick Hoban 90'	Report	Patching 42', 77'; Doherty 47'	Attendance: 2,861; Referee: Damien MacGraith

22 September 2023 Round 30	St Patrick's Athletic	3–1	Dundalk	Inchicore, Dublin
19:45	Lonergan 49', 57'; Melia 97'	Report	Daniel Kelly 74'; Robbie Benson (red card) 82'	Stadium: Richmond Park; Attendance: 3,921; Referee: Damien MacGraith

25 September 2023 Round 31	Dundalk	5–0	Cork City	Oriel Park
19:45	Hayden Muller 18'; Daryl Horgan 27'; Coleman (o.g.) 33'; Sam Durrant 55'; John Martin 87'	Report		Attendance: Unreported; Referee: Paul McLaughlin

29 September 2023 Round 32	Dundalk	3–1	Drogheda United	Drogheda
19:45	Paul Doyle 39'; Daniel Kelly 46'; Patrick Hoban 76'	Report	Robinson 25'	Stadium: Oriel Park; Attendance: 2,728; Referee: Rob Hennessy

6 October 2023 Round 33	Shelbourne	1–0	Dundalk	Drumcondra, Dublin
19:45	Jarvis 4'	Report		Stadium: Tolka Park; Attendance: 2,500 (est); Referee: Eoghan O’Shea

20 October 2023 Round 34	Sligo Rovers	0–2	Dundalk	Sligo
19:45	Burton (red card) 59'	Report	Daryl Horgan 20'; Sam Durrant 88'	Stadium: The Showgrounds; Attendance: 1,753; Referee: Paul McLaughlin

27 October 2023 Round 35	Dundalk	2–0	Bohemians	Oriel Park
19:45	Paul Doyle 78'; Daniel Kelly 90'	Report		Attendance: 3,000 (est); Referee: Rob Hennessy

4 November 2023 Round 36	U.C.D.	1–5	Dundalk	Dún Laoghaire–Rathdown
19:45	Gallagher 6'	Report	Paul Doyle 33'; Daryl Horgan 64'; Daniel Kelly 68'; Pat Hoban 70', 86'	Stadium: UCD Bowl; Attendance: unreported Referee: Kevin O’Sullivan

==== League table ====
Pos	Team	Pld	W	D	L	GF	GA	GD	Pts	Qualification or relegation
3	St Patrick's Athletic	36	19	5	12	59	42	+17	62	Qualification for Conference League second qualifying round (Note: The 2023 FAI Cup winners qualified for the Conference League second qualifying round. Since the cup winners (St Patrick's Athletic) qualified based on league position, the second Conference League first qualifying round spot was passed to the fourth-placed team.)
4	Shelbourne	36	15	15	6	44	27	+17	60	Qualification for Conference League first qualifying round
5	Dundalk	36	17	7	12	59	44	+15	58	
6	Bohemians	36	16	10	10	53	40	+13	58	
7	Drogheda United	36	10	11	15	40	54	−14	41	

Source: SSE Airtricity League,
Rules for classification: 1) Points; 2) Goal difference; 3) Goals scored.

=== FAI Cup ===
23 July 2023 First round	Dundalk	1–0	Shamrock Rovers	Oriel Park
17:00	Hayden Muller 23'; Paul Doyle (red card) 31'	Report		Attendance: 2,686; Referee: Rob Harvey

18 August 2023 Second round	Bray Wanderers	0–1	Dundalk	Bray, County Wicklow
19:45		Report	Daryl Horgan 86'	Stadium: Carlisle Grounds; Attendance: Unreported; Referee: Rob Hennessy

16 September 2023 Quarter final	Galway United	4–0	Dundalk	Galway
19:45	Walsh 8'; McCarthy 20'; Nugent 30'; Hurley 39'	Report		Stadium: Eamonn Deacy Park; Attendance: Unreported; Referee: David Dunne

=== Leinster Senior Cup ===
24 March 2023 Fourth round	Dundalk	0–4	Shelbourne	Dundalk
19:45	Hayden Muller (red card) 5'	Report	Moylan 8'; Robinson 35'; Caffrey 69'; Arubi 81'	Stadium: Oriel Park; Attendance: 950; Referee: Rob Harvey

=== UEFA Europa Conference League ===
==== First qualifying round ====
13 July 2023
18:00

Bruno's Magpies (Gibraltar)	0–0	(Republic of Ireland) Dundalk
	Report

Victoria Stadium, Gibraltar
Attendance: 847
Referee: Mohammad Usman Aslam (Norway)
20 July 2023
20:45 (19:45 IST)

Dundalk (Republic of Ireland)	3–1	(Gibraltar) Bruno's Magpies
Hoban 3'; Martin 48'; dos Santos 83' (o.g.)	Report	Joe 33'

Oriel Park, Dundalk
Attendance: 2,900
Referee: Patrik Kolarić (Croatia)

Dundalk won 3–1 on aggregate.

==== Second qualifying round ====
27 July 2023
20:00 (18:00 WET)

KA (Iceland)	3–1	(Republic of Ireland) Dundalk
Aðalsteinsson 28'; Hauksson 37', 45'	Report	Kelly 32'

Framvöllur, Reykjavík
Attendance: 915
Referee: Georgi Davidov (Bulgaria)
3 August 2023
20:45 (19:45 IST)

Dundalk (Republic of Ireland)	2–2	(Iceland) KA
Martin 33'; Sloggett 89'	Report	Edmundsson 14'; Steingrimsson 81' (pen.)

Oriel Park, Dundalk
Attendance: 2,900
Referee: Walter Altmann (Austria)

KA won 5–3 on aggregate.

== Awards ==
=== Player of the Month ===
Month	Player	Reference
June	(Republic of Ireland) Patrick Hoban	
