= Nathan Shepperd =

Welsh footballer

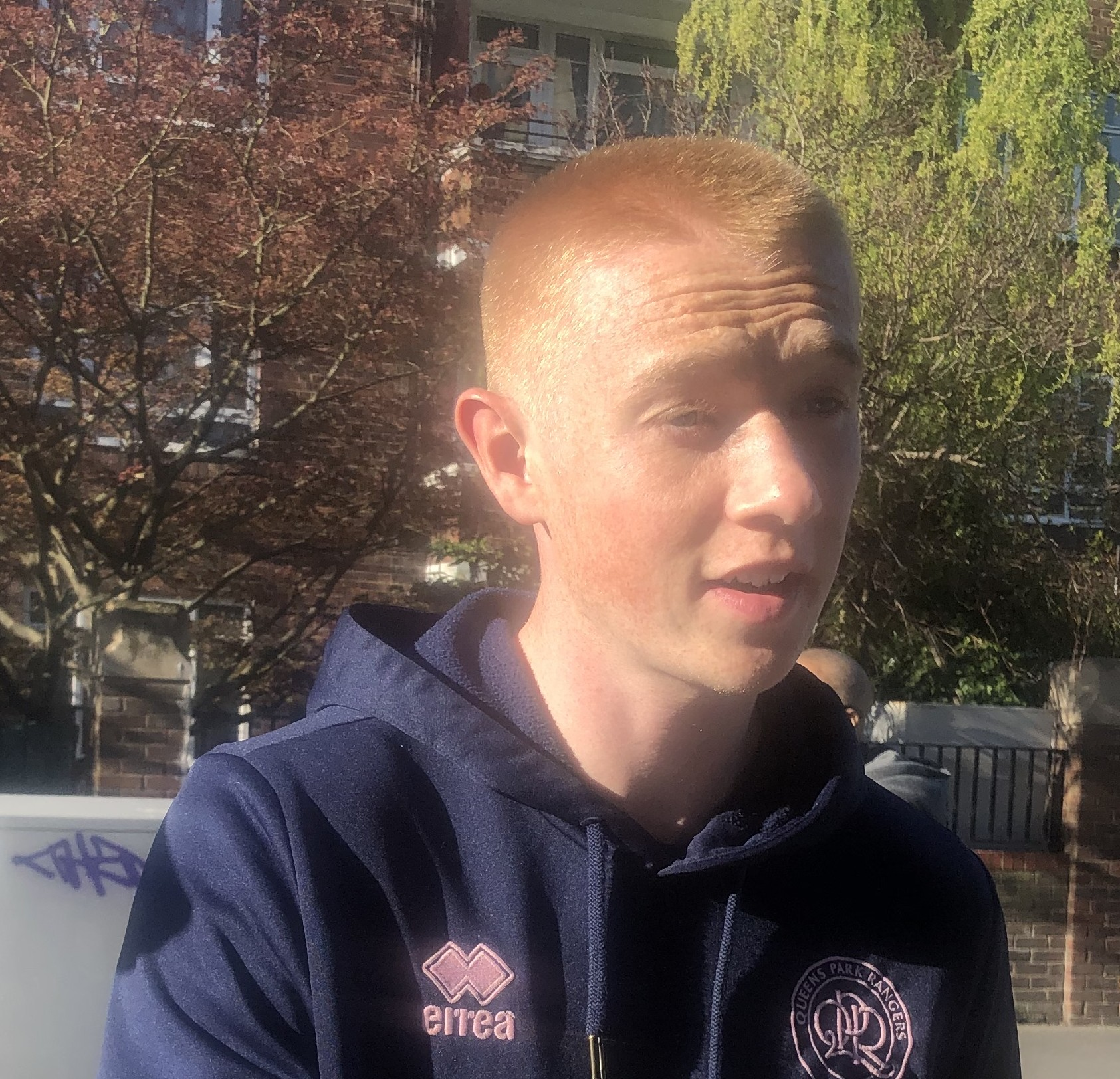
- Shepperd in 2025.

Personal information
- Full name: Nathan Shepperd
- Date of birth: 10 September 2000 (age 26)
- Place of birth: Tonypandy, Wales
- Height: 1.83 m (6 ft 0 in)
- Position: Goalkeeper

Team information
- Current team: The New Saints
- Number: 1

Youth career
- –2012: Cambrian & Clydach Vale
- 2012–2019: Swansea City
- 2019–2022: Brentford

Senior career*
Years	Team	Apps	(Gls)
2022–2023	Dundalk	69	(0)
2024	Wycombe Wanderers	0	(0)
2024–2025	Queens Park Rangers	0	(0)
2025–	The New Saints	43	(0)

International career
2021–2022	Wales U21	4	(0)
- * Club domestic league appearances and goals as of 06:41, 7 November 2026 (UTC)

Nathan Shepperd (born 10 September 2000) is a Welsh professional footballer who plays as a goalkeeper for Cymru Premier club The New Saints.

Shepperd is a product of the Swansea City academy and began his professional career with Brentford in 2019. He began his senior career with Dundalk in 2022 and transferred to Wycombe Wanderers in 2024. Shepperd was capped by Wales at U21 level.

== Club career ==
=== Swansea City ===
A goalkeeper, Shepperd began his youth career with Cambrian & Clydach Vale and later joined the Swansea City academy. He progressed to sign a scholarship deal at the end of the 2016–17 season. Shepperd was an unused substitute during the U19 team's 2017–18 FAW Welsh Youth Cup Final win, but he was released upon the completion of his scholarship at the end of the 2018–19 season.

=== Brentford ===
On 21 June 2019, Shepperd joined the B team at Championship club Brentford on a one-year contract, with the option of a further year. He captained the team on occasion during the 2019–20 season and his performances were recognised with the Players' Player of the Year award. After the break in the season caused by the COVID-19 pandemic, Shepperd was called up to train with the first team group ahead of the season restart in June 2020. His season was ended prematurely by a kidney and spleen injury suffered during the final friendly match of the pre-restart period. In July 2020, the club took up the one-year option on Shepperd's contract.

Shepperd returned to match play with the B team in early January 2021 and was an unused substitute for the first team during a 2–1 FA Cup third round win over Middlesbrough on 9 January. After making 9 B team appearances during the remainder of the 2020–21 season, Shepperd signed a new one-year contract, with a one-year option. He made 10 appearances for the B team during the first half of the 2021–22 season and transferred away from the club in January 2022. Shepperd made 45 B team appearances during his 2 1/2 years with Brentford.

=== Dundalk ===
On 7 January 2022, Shepperd transferred to League of Ireland Premier Division club Dundalk and signed a one-year contract, with a one-year option, for an undisclosed fee. In recognition of his performances during the 2022 season, Shepperd was named the club's Player of the Year and Supporters' Player of the Year, was thrice voted the club's Player of the Month and was nominated for the April 2022 League of Ireland Player of the Month and League of Ireland Goalkeeper of the Year awards.

The option on Shepperd's contract was exercised for the 2023 season and he made 42 appearances during a campaign which culminated in a mid-table finish. He was offered a new contract after the season, but turned it down and departed the club in January 2024. Shepperd made 79 appearances during his 18 months at Oriel Park.

=== Wycombe Wanderers ===
On 27 February 2024, Shepperd joined League One club Wycombe Wanderers on a contract running until the end of the 2023–24 season. He was an unused substitute on seven occasions and left the club when his contract expired.

=== Queens Park Rangers ===
On 26 October 2024, it was announced that Shepperd had signed a contract with Championship club Queens Park Rangers.

=== The New Saints ===
In June 2025 it was announced that he had signed for The New Saints.

== International career ==
Shepperd was called into the Wales U21 squad for two 2021 UEFA European U21 Championship qualifiers in March 2020, which were later postponed. In March 2021, Shepperd was called into the Wales U21 squad for a training camp and friendly match versus Republic of Ireland U21. He played the second half of the 2–1 defeat. Shepperd made three 2023 European U21 Championship qualifying appearances during the second half of the 2021–22 season.

== Career statistics ==
As of match played 15 March 2025

Appearances and goals by club, season and competition
Club	Season	League			National cup (Note: Includes FAI Cup, FA Cup)		League cup		Other		Total	
Club	Season	Division	Apps	Goals	Apps	Goals	Apps	Goals	Apps	Goals	Apps	Goals
Dundalk	2022	League of Ireland Premier Division	33	0	3	0	―		―		36	0
Dundalk	2023	League of Ireland Premier Division	36	0	3	0	0	0	4 (Note: Appearances in Europa Conference League)	0	43	0
Dundalk	Total		69	0	6	0	0	0	4	0	79	0
Wycombe Wanderers	2023–24	League One	0	0	0	0	0	0	―		0	0
Queens Park Rangers	2024–25	Championship	0	0	0	0	0	0	―		0	0
Career total			69	0	6	0	0	0	4	0	79	0

== Honours ==
- Brentford B Players' Player of the Year: 2019–20
- Dundalk Player of the Month: March 2022, April 2022, August 2022
- Dundalk Player of the Year: 2022
- Dundalk Supporters' Player of the Year: 2022
