= Joe Adams (footballer, born 2001) =

Welsh footballer

Personal information
- Full name: Joseph Anthony Adams
- Date of birth: 13 February 2001 (age 25)
- Place of birth: Bolton, England
- Height: 1.76 m (5 ft 9 in)
- Position: Left winger

Team information
- Current team: Mossley

Youth career
- –2018: Bury

Senior career*
Years	Team	Apps	(Gls)
2018–2019	Bury	3	(0)
2019–2022	Brentford	0	(0)
2021	→ Grimsby Town (loan)	6	(1)
2022	Dundalk	33	(1)
2023	Southport	10	(0)
2023	Atherton Collieries	7	(3)
2023–2024	Warrington Rylands 1906	12	(5)
2024	Atherton Collieries	4	(0)
2024	Widnes	1	(0)
2024–2025	Longridge Town	5	(1)
2025	Kerry	25	(2)
2026–	Mossley	11	(2)

International career
2017	Wales U17	3	(0)
2018–2020	Wales U19	11	(2)
2020	Wales U20	1	(0)
2020–2022	Wales U21	11	(5)
- * Club domestic league appearances and goals as of 17:28, 2 August 2026 (UTC)

Joseph Anthony Adams (born 13 February 2001) is a professional footballer who plays as a left winger for Northern Premier League Division One West club Mossley.

A graduate of the Bury academy, Adams made sporadic appearances during 18 months as a professional at the club and transferred to Brentford in 2019. After 2 1/2 years of exclusively B team football, he transferred to Dundalk in 2022. Following the 2022 season, Adams moved into non-League football. He returned to Irish football with Kerry in 2025. Adams was capped by Wales at youth level. A utility player, he is also adept as an attacking midfielder or wing back.

== Club career ==
=== Bury ===
Predominantly a left winger, Adams joined Bury at the age of seven. Having graduated through the club's academy, he made his first team debut as a substitute for Adam Thompson after 72 minutes of a 3–2 League One defeat to Northampton Town on 14 April 2018. After making four further senior appearances, Adams signed a 2 1/2-year professional contract in December 2018. His progression was such that later that month, he was recognised by League Football Education for his football and academic progress. After remaining with the U18 team and making only one further senior appearance during the 2018–19 season, Adams elected to depart Gigg Lane in July 2019. He was voted the club's 2018–19 Young Player of the Year.

=== Brentford ===
On 19 July 2019, Adams transferred to the B team at Championship club Brentford and signed a three-year contract for an undisclosed fee. He scored 18 goals in 65 B team appearances during 2 1/2 years with the club and gained experience as a right wing back. Despite receiving a first team squad number during the 2019–20 season, Adams failed to win a call into a matchday squad. On 1 February 2021, Adams joined League Two club Grimsby Town on loan until the end of the 2020–21 season. On his second appearance, in a league match versus Crawley Town on 25 February, Adams assisted Filipe Morais for the Mariners' opening goal and scored what proved to be the winner in a 2–1 victory. After four further appearances, the loan was terminated early on 9 April. Adams departed Brentford in January 2022.

=== Dundalk ===
In January 2022, Adams signed a one-year contract with League of Ireland Premier Division club Dundalk for an undisclosed fee. He made 35 appearances and scored one goal during the 2022 season, his only campaign with the club.

=== Non-League football ===
On 14 March 2023, Adams signed an undisclosed-length contract with National League North club Southport. He made 12 appearances during the remainder of the 2022–23 season and was a part of the club's Lancashire FA Challenge Trophy-winning squad. On 26 September 2023, Adams transferred to Northern Premier League Premier Division club Atherton Collieries. After three goals in eight appearances, he transferred across the division to Warrington Rylands 1906. Adams ended the 2023–24 season with 12 appearances and five goals.

In July 2024, Adams transferred back to Atherton Collieries, which had been relegated to the Northern Premier League First Division West in his absence. He made a further five appearances before departing in September 2024. On 19 October 2024, Adams made a single appearance for Widnes, of the same division, before transferring to North West Counties League Premier Division club Longridge Town.

=== Kerry ===
On 29 January 2025, Adams transferred to League of Ireland First Division club Kerry. On his debut appearance versus Finn Harps on the opening night of the 2025 season, Adams scored the opening goal, but was later sent off for a straight red card in the 2–0 win. He made 29 appearances and scored six goals during the season, which included a run to the semi-final of the FAI Cup. Adams departed the club after the season.

=== Mossley ===
On 7 February 2026, Adams transferred to Northern Premier League First Division West club Mossley. He made 13 appearances and scored two goals during the remainder of the 2025–26 season. Adams was retained for the 2026–27 season.

== International career ==
Adams won 26 caps and scored seven goals for Wales at U17, U19, U20 and U21 levels.

== Personal life ==
Adams grew up in Bolton, to a Liverpudlian father and a North Walian mother.

== Career statistics ==
As of match played 3 April 2026

Appearances and goals by club, season and competition
Club	Season	League			National cup (Note: Includes FA Cup, FAI Cup)		League cup (Note: Includes EFL Cup)		Other		Total	
Club	Season	Division	Apps	Goals	Apps	Goals	Apps	Goals	Apps	Goals	Apps	Goals
Bury	2017–18	League One	2	0	0	0	0	0	0	0	2	0
Bury	2018–19	League Two	1	0	1	0	0	0	2 (Note: Appearances in EFL Trophy)	0	4	0
Bury	Total		3	0	1	0	0	0	2	0	6	0
Grimsby Town (loan)	2020–21	League Two	6	1	―		―		―		6	1
Dundalk	2022	League of Ireland Premier Division	33	0	2	1	―		―		35	1
Southport	2022–23	National League North	10	0	―		―		3 (Note: 2 appearances in Lancashire FA Challenge Trophy, 1 appearance in Liverpool Senior Cup)	0	13	0
Atherton Collieries	2023–24	Northern Premier League Premier Division	7	3	―		―		1 (Note: Appearance in FA Trophy)	0	8	3
Warrington Rylands 1906	2023–24	Northern Premier League Premier Division	12	5	―		―		0	0	12	5
Atherton Collieries	2024–25	Northern Premier League First Division West	4	0	1	0	―		0	0	5	0
Widnes	2024–25	Northern Premier League First Division West	1	0	―		―		―		1	0
Longridge Town	2024–25	North West Counties League Premier Division	5	1	―		―		1 (Note: Appearance in Lancashire FA Challenge Trophy)	1	6	2
Kerry	2025	League of Ireland First Division	25	2	4	4	―		―		29	6
Mossley	2025–26	Northern Premier League First Division West	11	2	―		―		0	0	11	2
Career total			117	14	8	5	0	0	7	1	132	20

== Honours ==
Southport

- Lancashire FA Challenge Trophy: 2022–23

Individual

- Bury Young Player of the Year: 2018–19
