= 2021–22 Hibernian F.C. season =

Hibernian
2021–22 season
- Chairman: Ron Gordon
- Manager: Jack Ross (until 9 December); David Gray (caretaker) (9 December – 20 December and from 19 April); Shaun Maloney (20 December – 19 April)
- Stadium: Easter Road; Leith, Edinburgh, Scotland (Capacity: 20,421)
- Premiership: 8th
- Scottish Cup: Semi-finals
- League Cup: Runners-up
- UEFA Europa Conference League: Third qualifying round
- Top goalscorer: League: Martin Boyle (7); All: Martin Boyle (14)
- Highest home attendance: 20,419 vs. Heart of Midlothian, 2 February
- Lowest home attendance: 5,600 vs. Ross County, 8 August (Note: Attendance restricted due to COVID-19 pandemic regulations.)
- Average home league attendance: 14,970
Home colours	Away colours	Third colours

The 2021–22 season was Hibernian's fifth season of play back in the top flight of Scottish football, having been promoted from the Scottish Championship at the end of the 2016–17 season. Hibs lost 2–1 to Celtic in the League Cup final and by the same score to Hearts in a Scottish Cup semi-final. Earlier in the season they participated in the inaugural edition of the UEFA Europa Conference League, losing to Croatian side HNK Rijeka.

== Results and fixtures ==
Win Draw Loss Postponed

=== Friendlies ===
2 July 2021 Friendly	Civil Service Strollers	3–5	Hibernian	Edinburgh
19:30 BST	Duffy; Faye; Johnston	Edinburgh Evening News	Hamilton; O'Connor; Aiken	Stadium: Christie Gillies Park; Attendance: 200

3 July 2021 Friendly	Hibernian	4–1	Dunfermline Athletic	Ormiston
	MacKay; Murphy; Bradley; Young	Report	O'Hara	Stadium: Hibernian Training Centre; Attendance: None

6 July 2021 Friendly	Hibernian	0–1	Accrington Stanley	Cheshire
		Report	Pritchard 86'	Attendance: None

6 July 2021 Friendly	Dunbar United	2–2	Hibernian	Dunbar
19:30 BST	McLaren 40'; Edmond 60'	Report	Laidlaw; Young 70'	Stadium: New Countess Park

9 July 2021 Friendly	Stoke City	1–1	Hibernian	Stoke-on-Trent
	Doughty 45'	Report	Allan 17'	Stadium: Bet365 Stadium; Attendance: None

13 July 2021 Friendly	Hibernian	2–1	Arsenal	Edinburgh
18:00 BST	Boyle 21'; MacKay 70'	Report	Smith Rowe 82'	Stadium: Easter Road; Attendance: 2,000

16 July 2021 Testimonial match	Raith Rovers	1–3	Hibernian	Kirkcaldy
19:00 BST	Connolly 37'	Report	Porteous 3'; Bradley 29'; Nisbet 32'	Stadium: Stark's Park; Attendance:

=== Scottish Premiership ===
Hibs had a significant COVID-19 outbreak in their squad in late October, which caused the postponement of matches at Ross County and Livingston.

Manager Jack Ross was sacked on 9 December, following a run of seven defeats in nine league matches. After three games under the caretaker management of David Gray, including a League Cup final defeat, Shaun Maloney was appointed manager on 20 December. Hibs won their first two games under Maloney, but a run of one win in 13 league games meant that they were in the bottom six when the league split after 33 games. Maloney was sacked on 19 April, with Gray taking interim charge for the rest of the season.

1 August 2021 1	Motherwell	2–3	Hibernian	Motherwell
16:30 BST	van Veen 12'; Mugabi 29'	Report	Magennis 17'; Doidge 56'; Boyle 70' (pen.)	Stadium: Fir Park; Attendance: 2,540; Referee: David Munro

8 August 2021 2	Hibernian	3–0	Ross County	Edinburgh
15:00 BST	Boyle 22'; Magennis 26'; Doidge 33'	Report		Stadium: Easter Road; Attendance: 5,600; Referee: Grant Irvine

22 August 2021 3	Dundee	2–2	Hibernian	Dundee
12:00 BST	Cummings 11'; McGowan 83'	Report	Boyle 39' (pen.); Porteous 59'	Stadium: Dens Park; Referee: Alan Muir

28 August 2021 4	Hibernian	2–0	Livingston	Edinburgh
15:00 BST	Nisbet 51'; Boyle 89'	Report		Stadium: Easter Road; Attendance: 13,431; Referee: Steven McLean

12 September 2021 5	Heart of Midlothian	0–0	Hibernian	Edinburgh
12:00 BST		Report		Stadium: Tynecastle Park; Attendance: 18,177; Referee: Nick Walsh

18 September 2021 6	Hibernian	2–2	St Mirren	Edinburgh
15:00 BST	McGinn 57'; Boyle 61' (pen.)	Report	Brophy 42'; Shaughnessy 88'	Stadium: Easter Road; Attendance: 13,501; Referee: Kevin Clancy

26 September 2021 7	Hibernian	1–0	St Johnstone	Edinburgh
15:00 BST	Boyle 61' (pen.)	Report		Stadium: Easter Road; Attendance: 13,263; Referee: John Beaton

3 October 2021 8	Rangers	2–1	Hibernian	Glasgow
15:00 BST	Roofe 60'; Morelos 78'	Report	Nisbet 8'	Stadium: Ibrox Stadium; Attendance: 49,125; Referee: Nick Walsh

16 October 2021 9	Hibernian	0–3	Dundee United	Edinburgh
15:00 BST		Report	Clark 44'; Edwards 52'; Freeman 74'	Stadium: Easter Road; Attendance: 15,114; Referee: Alan Muir

23 October 2021 10	Aberdeen	1–0	Hibernian	Aberdeen
15:00 BST	Ramirez 27'	Report		Stadium: Pittodrie Stadium; Attendance: 9,431; Referee: Greg Aitken

27 October 2021 11	Hibernian	1–3	Celtic	Edinburgh
19:45 BST	Boyle 37'	Report	Ralston 10'; Carter-Vickers 14'; Furuhashi 30'	Stadium: Easter Road; Attendance: 17,580; Referee: Don Robertson

24 November 2021 12	Ross County	1–0	Hibernian	Dingwall
19:45 GMT	Spittal 72'	Report		Stadium: Victoria Park; Attendance: 3,316; Referee: Gavin Duncan

27 November 2021 13	St Johnstone	1–2	Hibernian	Perth
15:00 GMT	Porteous 40' (o.g.)	Report	Nisbet 83'; Murphy 86'	Stadium: McDiarmid Park; Referee: Euan Anderson

1 December 2021 14	Hibernian	0–1	Rangers	Edinburgh
19:45 GMT		Report	Roofe 85' (pen.)	Stadium: Easter Road; Attendance: 17,209; Referee: John Beaton

4 December 2021 15	Hibernian	1–1	Motherwell	Edinburgh
15:00 GMT	Nisbet 33'	Report	Watt 60'	Stadium: Easter Road; Attendance: 15,266; Referee: Colin Steven

8 December 2021 16	Livingston	1–0	Hibernian	Livingston
19:45 GMT	McMillan 16'	Report		Stadium: Almondvale Stadium; Attendance: 2,363; Referee: Don Robertson

11 December 2021 17	St Mirren	1–1	Hibernian	Paisley
15:00 GMT	Shaughnessy 87'	Report	Josh Campbell 52'	Stadium: St Mirren Park; Attendance: 4,698; Referee: Kevin Clancy

14 December 2021 18	Hibernian	1–0	Dundee	Edinburgh
19:45 GMT	McMullan 34' (o.g.)	Report		Stadium: Easter Road; Attendance: 13,516; Referee: Gavin Duncan

22 December 2021 19	Hibernian	1–0	Aberdeen	Edinburgh
19:45 GMT	Porteous 64'	Report		Stadium: Easter Road; Attendance: 14,314; Referee: Alan Muir

26 December 2021 20	Dundee United	1–3	Hibernian	Dundee
15:00 GMT	Glass 90'	Report	Nisbet 38'; Cadden 78'; Murphy 90+3'	Stadium: Tannadice Park; Attendance: Referee: William Collum

17 January 2022 21	Celtic	2–0	Hibernian	Glasgow
19:45 GMT	Maeda 4'; Juranovic 25' (pen.)	Report		Stadium: Celtic Park; Referee: William Collum

26 January 2022 22	Motherwell	0–0	Hibernian	Motherwell
19:45 GMT		Report		Stadium: Fir Park; Referee: Andrew Dallas

29 January 2022 23	Hibernian	2–3	Livingston	Edinburgh
15:00 GMT	Mitchell 6'; Cadden 32'	Report	Obileye 18'; Fitzwater 53'; Forrest 59'	Stadium: Easter Road; Attendance: 15,480; Referee: Grant Irvine

1 February 2022 24	Hibernian	0–0	Heart of Midlothian	Edinburgh
19:45 GMT		Report		Stadium: Easter Road; Attendance: 20,419; Referee: Don Robertson

5 February 2022 25	Hibernian	0–1	St Mirren	Edinburgh
15:00 GMT		Report	Ronan 62'	Stadium: Easter Road; Attendance: 13,227; Referee: Greg Aitken

9 February 2022 26	Rangers	2–0	Hibernian	Glasgow
19:45 GMT	Tavernier 5' (pen.); Morelos 57'	Report		Stadium: Ibrox Stadium; Attendance: 49,700; Referee: Nick Walsh

19 February 2022 27	Hibernian	2–0	Ross County	Edinburgh
15:00 GMT	Doyle-Hayes 50', 78'	Report		Stadium: Easter Road; Attendance: 14,149; Referee: Steven McLean

27 February 2022 28	Hibernian	0–0	Celtic	Edinburgh
12:00 GMT		Report		Stadium: Easter Road; Attendance: 17,374; Referee: Kevin Clancy

2 March 2022 29	Dundee	0–0	Hibernian	Dundee
19:45 GMT		Report		Stadium: Dens Park; Referee: David Munro

5 March 2022 30	Hibernian	0–0	St Johnstone	Edinburgh
15:00 GMT		Report		Stadium: Easter Road; Attendance: 19,585; Referee: Craig Napier

19 March 2022 31	Aberdeen	3–1	Hibernian	Aberdeen
15:00 GMT	Ferguson 37' (pen.), 64' (pen.); Besuijen 80'	Report	Ramsay 20' (o.g.)	Stadium: Pittodrie Stadium; Attendance: 15,321; Referee: Alan Muir

2 April 2022 32	Hibernian	1–1	Dundee United	Edinburgh
15:00 BST	Clarke 45+1'	Report	Graham 10'	Stadium: Easter Road; Attendance: 16,707; Referee: Don Robertson

9 April 2022 33	Heart of Midlothian	3–1	Hibernian	Edinburgh
15:00 BST	Halliday 45+1', 58'; Kingsley 47'	Report	Wright 5'	Stadium: Tynecastle Park; Attendance: 19,041; Referee: Nick Walsh

23 April 2022 34	St Mirren	0–1	Hibernian	Paisley
15:00 BST		Report	Henderson 74'	Stadium: St Mirren Park; Attendance: 4,992; Referee: Euan Anderson

30 April 2022 35	Livingston	1–0	Hibernian	Livingston
15:00 BST	Pittman 57'	Report		Stadium: Almondvale Stadium; Attendance: 2,840; Referee: Chris Graham

7 May 2022 36	Hibernian	1–1	Aberdeen	Edinburgh
15:00 BST	McGinn 83'	Report	Bates 55'	Stadium: Easter Road; Attendance: 14,509; Referee: Bobby Madden

10 May 2022 37	Dundee	3–1	Hibernian	Dundee
19:45 BST	McGinn 3'; Mulligan 67'; Adam 86'	Report	Scott 29'	Stadium: Dens Park; Attendance: 5,452; Referee: Craig Napier

15 May 2022 38	Hibernian	4–0	St Johnstone	Edinburgh
12:00 BST	McGinn 44'; Scott 48', 61', 88'	Report		Stadium: Easter Road; Attendance: 14,233; Referee: David Dickinson

=== Scottish Cup ===
As a Premiership club, Hibs entered the 2021–22 Scottish Cup at the fourth round (last 32) stage and were given a home draw against League One club Cove Rangers. Hibs needed extra time to edge past Cove 1–0, and were then drawn away to Championship side Arbroath in the last 16. Wins at Arbroath and Motherwell put Hibs into the semi-finals, where they were paired with Edinburgh derby rivals Hearts. Hibs lost the semi-final 2–1, and manager Shaun Maloney was sacked a few days later.

20 January 2022 Fourth round	Hibernian	1–0 (a.e.t.)	Cove Rangers	Edinburgh
19:45 GMT	Nisbet 112'	Report		Stadium: Easter Road; Attendance: 5,849; Referee: Euan Anderson

13 February 2022 Fifth round	Arbroath	1–3	Hibernian	Arbroath
12:30 GMT	Wighton 6'	Report	Mitchell 20'; Nisbet 71'; Mueller 87'	Stadium: Gayfield Park; Attendance: 4,049; Referee: William Collum

13 March 2022 Quarter-final	Motherwell	1–2	Hibernian	Motherwell
12:30 GMT	Efford 43'	Report	Melkersen 15', 37'	Stadium: Fir Park; Attendance: 8,126; Referee: William Collum

16 April 2022 Semi-final	Heart of Midlothian	2–1	Hibernian	Glasgow
12:15 BST	Simms 16'; Kingsley 21'	Report	Cadden 22'	Stadium: Hampden Park; Attendance: 37,783; Referee: John Beaton

=== Scottish League Cup ===
As one of the clubs that qualified for European competition, Hibs received a bye through to the second round (last 16) of the League Cup. At that stage they were given a home draw against Championship club Kilmarnock. A 2–0 win put Hibs into a quarter-final at Dundee United. Three first-half goals gave Hibs a 3–1 win at Tannadice, which meant that Hibs qualified for a fifth consecutive national cup semi-final. Hibs were drawn to play defending league champions Rangers at that stage.

Hibs did not play a competitive match for almost a month before the semi-final due to a COVID-19 outbreak, which led to the postponement of two league fixtures. Despite this disruption, a Martin Boyle hat-trick put Hibs three goals ahead and they held on for a place in the final with a 3–1 victory. Hibs sacked manager Jack Ross ten days before the final, following a poor run of form in the Premiership. They took the lead in the final, but two goals by Kyogo Furuhashi won the cup for Celtic.

15 August 2021 Second round	Hibernian	2–0	Kilmarnock	Edinburgh
14:00 BST	Magennis 51'; Nisbet 73'	Report		Stadium: Easter Road; Attendance: 5,990; Referee: Bobby Madden

23 September 2021 Quarter-final	Dundee United	1–3	Hibernian	Dundee
19:45 BST	Pawlett 58'	Report	Newell 3'; Allan 37'; Boyle 45+1' (pen.)	Stadium: Tannadice Park; Attendance: 5,395; Referee: William Collum

21 November 2021 Semi-final	Rangers	1–3	Hibernian	Glasgow
16:00 GMT	Arfield 40'	Report	Boyle 9', 21', 38' (pen.)	Stadium: Hampden Park; Referee: Kevin Clancy

19 December 2021 Final	Hibernian	1–2	Celtic	Glasgow
15:00 GMT	Hanlon 51'	Report	Furuhashi 52', 72'	Stadium: Hampden Park; Referee: John Beaton

=== UEFA Europa Conference League ===
Having finished third in the 2020–21 Scottish Premiership, Hibs qualified for the newly created Conference League competition. The draw for the second qualifying round, the stage at which Hibs entered, was held on 16 June 2021. They progressed through their first tie with two wins against Andorran side FC Santa Coloma, but were eliminated in the next round by Croatians HNK Rijeka. Hibs had levelled the tie early in the second half of the second leg in Croatia, but a red card for Darren McGregor was followed by the concession of three goals without reply.

==== Second qualifying round ====
22 July 2021 QR2	Hibernian (Scotland)	3–0	(Andorra) FC Santa Coloma	Edinburgh
19:45 BST	Boyle 14' (pen.), 47'; Nisbet 81'	Report		Stadium: Easter Road; Attendance: 4,697; Referee: Vilhjalmur Thorarinsson (Iceland)

29 July 2021 QR2	FC Santa Coloma (Andorra)	1–2 (1–5 agg.)	(Scotland) Hibernian	Andorra la Vella
17:30 BST	Lopez 70'	Report	Murphy 73'; MacKay 75'	Stadium: Estadi Nacional; Attendance: None; Referee: Alex Troleis (Faroe Islands)

==== Third qualifying round ====
5 August 2021 QR3	Hibernian (Scotland)	1–1	(Croatia) HNK Rijeka	Edinburgh
19:45 BST	Boyle 67'	Report	Ampem 61'	Stadium: Easter Road; Attendance: 5,600; Referee: Juan Martínez Munuera (Spain)

12 August 2021 QR3	HNK Rijeka (Croatia)	4–1 (5–2 agg.)	(Scotland) Hibernian	Rijeka
19:00 BST	Pavičić 36'; Issah 68'; McGinn 73' (o.g.); Bušnja 90+3'	Report	Magennis 56'	Stadium: Stadion Rujevica; Attendance: 4,077; Referee: Donatas Rumšas (Lithuania)

== Player statistics ==
As of 15 May 2022

No.	Pos	Player	Premiership		League Cup		Scottish Cup		Europe		Total	
No.	Pos	Player	Apps	Goals	Apps	Goals	Apps	Goals	Apps	Goals	Apps	Goals
Goalkeepers
1	GK	(England) Matt Macey	32	0	4	0	4	0	4	0	44	0
21	GK	(Poland) Kevin Dąbrowski	6	0	0	0	0	0	0	0	6	0
Defenders
2	DF	(England) Harry Clarke	7	1	0	0	1	0	0	0	8	1
3	DF	(Scotland) Josh Doig	34	0	3	0	3	0	2	0	42	0
4	DF	(Scotland) Paul Hanlon	24	0	3	1	2	0	3	0	32	1
5	DF	(Scotland) Ryan Porteous	29	2	4	0	3	0	4	0	40	2
6	DF	(Scotland) Paul McGinn	25	3	4	0	1	0	4	0	34	3
12	DF	(England) Nathan Wood	1	0	0	0	0	0	0	0	1	0
16	DF	(Scotland) Lewis Stevenson	23	0	4	0	4	0	2	0	33	0
24	DF	(Scotland) Darren McGregor	10	0	2	0	1	0	2	0	15	0
27	DF	(Scotland) Chris Cadden	28	2	2	0	4	1	0	0	34	3
33	DF	(Belgium) Rocky Bushiri	14	0	0	0	1	0	0	0	15	0
36	DF	(Belgium) Allan Delferriere	1	0	0	0	0	0	0	0	1	0
49	DF	(Scotland) Oscar MacIntyre	1	0	0	0	0	0	0	0	1	0
Midfielders
7	MF	(Scotland) Kyle Magennis	7	2	2	1	0	0	4	1	13	4
8	MF	(England) Drey Wright	17	1	1	0	2	0	2	0	22	1
11	MF	(England) Joe Newell	27	0	4	1	3	0	3	0	37	1
13	MF	(Cyprus) Alex Gogić	9	0	1	0	0	0	4	0	14	0
17	MF	(Scotland) Daniel MacKay	2	0	1	0	0	0	3	1	6	1
19	MF	(England) Demetri Mitchell	6	1	0	0	1	1	0	0	7	2
20	MF	(Sweden) Melker Hallberg	0	0	0	0	1	0	0	0	1	0
22	MF	(Republic of Ireland) Jake Doyle-Hayes	34	2	4	0	3	0	3	0	44	2
23	MF	(Scotland) Scott Allan	17	0	3	1	1	0	2	0	23	1
29	MF	(Scotland) Steven Bradley	1	0	0	0	0	0	0	0	1	0
32	MF	(Scotland) Josh Campbell	26	1	2	0	4	0	3	0	35	1
46	MF	(Scotland) Jacob Blaney	1	0	0	0	0	0	0	0	1	0
47	MF	(Scotland) Murray Aiken	1	0	0	0	0	0	0	0	1	0
48	MF	(Scotland) Robbie Hamilton	1	0	0	0	0	0	0	0	1	0
80	MF	(Scotland) Ewan Henderson	16	1	0	0	4	0	0	0	20	1
Forwards
9	FW	(Wales) Christian Doidge	17	2	2	0	3	0	3	0	25	2
10	FW	(Australia) Martin Boyle	20	7	4	4	0	0	4	3	28	14
14	FW	(United States) Chris Mueller	11	0	0	0	4	1	0	0	15	1
15	FW	(Scotland) Kevin Nisbet	26	5	4	1	2	2	4	1	36	9
18	FW	(Scotland) Jamie Murphy	17	2	2	0	1	0	3	1	23	3
19	FW	(Scotland) Jamie Gullan	6	0	1	0	0	0	0	0	7	0
20	FW	(Bulgaria) Sylvester Jasper	13	0	0	0	3	0	0	0	16	0
25	FW	(Scotland) James Scott	16	4	1	0	2	0	0	0	19	4
30	FW	(Norway) Runar Hauge	2	0	0	0	0	0	0	0	2	0
34	FW	(Norway) Elias Melkersen	10	0	0	0	2	2	0	0	12	2
39	FW	(Scotland) Josh O'Connor	1	0	0	0	0	0	0	0	1	0

== Club statistics ==
=== League table ===
Pos	Team	Pld	W	D	L	GF	GA	GD	Pts	Qualification or relegation (Note: Teams play each other three times (33 matches), before the league is split into two groups (the top six and the bottom six).)
6	Ross County	38	10	11	17	47	61	−14	41	
7	Livingston	38	13	10	15	41	46	−5	49	
8	Hibernian	38	11	12	15	38	42	−4	45	
9	St Mirren	38	10	14	14	33	51	−18	44	
10	Aberdeen	38	10	11	17	41	46	−5	41	

Rules for classification: 1) Points; 2) Goal difference; 3) Goals scored; 4) Head-to-head points; 5) Head-to-Head goal difference; 6) Play-off (only if deciding champion, UEFA competitions qualification, second stage group allocation or relegation).

=== Division summary ===
Round	1	2	3	4	5	6	7	8	9	10	11	12	13	14	15	16	17	18	19	20	21	22	23	24	25	26	27	28	29	30	31	32	33	34	35	36	37	38
Ground	A	H	A	H	A	H	H	A	H	A	H	A	A	H	H	A	A	H	H	A	A	A	H	H	H	A	H	H	A	H	A	H	A	A	A	H	A	H
Result	W	W	D	W	D	D	W	L	L	L	L	L	W	L	D	L	D	W	W	W	L	D	L	D	L	L	W	D	D	D	L	D	L	W	L	D	L	W
Position	3	1	1	1	2	2	2	3	5	5	5	7	6	6	7	7	7	7	5	5	5	5	5	5	5	7	4	4	5	4	5	6	7	7	8	8	9	8

Updated to match(es) played on 15 May 2022. Source:
A = Away; H = Home; W = Win; D = Draw; L = Loss

=== Management statistics ===
As of 15 May 2022

Name	From	To	P	W	D	L	Win% (Note: Win% is the percentage of matches won rounded to two decimal places.)
(Scotland) Jack Ross	1 July 2021	9 December 2021	23	10	5	8	43.48
(Scotland) David Gray	9 December 2021	20 December 2021	3	1	1	1	33.33
(Scotland) Shaun Maloney	20 December 2021	19 April 2022	19	6	6	7	31.58
(Scotland) David Gray	19 April 2022	19 May 2022	5	2	1	2	40.00

== Transfers ==
American international Chris Mueller signed a pre-contract agreement with Hibs in July 2021, with the player joining the club in January 2022. Mueller made little impact after joining the club, and was allowed to return to America in May. Raith Rovers teenager Dylan Tait was signed on 31 August 2021, but was loaned back to the Fife club as part of the deal.

During the January transfer window, top goalscorer Martin Boyle was sold to Saudi Professional League club Al Faisaly for around £3 million.

=== Players in ===
Player	From	Fee
(Scotland) Jamie Murphy	(Scotland) Rangers	Free
(Scotland) Daniel MacKay	(Scotland) Inverness CT	Undisclosed
(Republic of Ireland) Jake Doyle-Hayes	(Scotland) St Mirren	Free
(Scotland) David Mitchell	(Scotland) Clyde	Undisclosed
(Scotland) Dylan Tait	(Scotland) Raith Rovers	Undisclosed
(United States) Chris Mueller	(United States) Orlando City SC	Free
(Norway) Elias Melkersen	(Norway) Bodø/Glimt	£300,000
(England) Demetri Mitchell	(England) Blackpool	Undisclosed
(Norway) Runar Hauge	(Norway) Bodø/Glimt	Undisclosed
(United States) Emmanuel Johnson	(United States) Barça Residency Academy	Free

=== Players out ===
Player	To	Fee
(Scotland) Stephen McGinn	(Scotland) Kilmarnock	Free
(Scotland) Fraser Murray	(Scotland) Kilmarnock	Undisclosed
(Scotland) Callum Yeats	(Scotland) Queen's Park	Undisclosed
(Scotland) David Gray	Retired	
(Israel) Ofir Marciano	(Netherlands) Feyenoord	Free
(Australia) Jackson Irvine	(Germany) FC St. Pauli	Free
(Scotland) Stevie Mallan	(Turkey) Yeni Malatyaspor	Undisclosed
(Wales) Tom James	(England) Leyton Orient	Free
(Scotland) Ryan Shanley	(Scotland) Edinburgh City	Free
(Scotland) Jamie Gullan	(Scotland) Raith Rovers	Undisclosed
(Australia) Martin Boyle	(Saudi Arabia) Al Faisaly	£3,000,000
(Sweden) Melker Hallberg	(Scotland) St Johnstone	Free
(United States) Chris Mueller	(United States) Chicago Fire	Free

=== Loans in ===
Player	From
(Scotland) James Scott	(England) Hull City
(England) Nathan Wood	(England) Middlesbrough
(Scotland) Ewan Henderson	(Scotland) Celtic
(England) Harry Clarke	(England) Arsenal
(Democratic Republic of the Congo) Rocky Bushiri	(England) Norwich City
(Bulgaria) Sylvester Jasper	(England) Fulham

=== Loans out ===
Player	To
(Scotland) Ryan Shanley	(Scotland) Edinburgh City
(Scotland) Innes Murray	(Scotland) Edinburgh City
(Scotland) Dylan Tait	(Scotland) Raith Rovers
(Scotland) Steven Bradley	(Scotland) Ayr United
(Scotland) Jack Brydon	(Scotland) Edinburgh City
(Scotland) Daniel MacKay	(Scotland) Kilmarnock
(Scotland) Dylan Tait	(Scotland) Kilmarnock
(Cyprus) Alex Gogić	(Scotland) St Mirren
(Scotland) Jamie Murphy	(England) Mansfield Town
(Scotland) Steven Bradley	(Republic of Ireland) Dundalk
(Scotland) Sean Mackie	(Scotland) Raith Rovers
(United States) Emmanuel Johnson	(United States) Charleston Battery

== See also ==
- List of Hibernian F.C. seasons
