= Steven Bradley (Scottish footballer) =

Scottish footballer

Personal information
- Date of birth: 17 March 2002 (age 24)
- Place of birth: Glasgow, Scotland
- Position: Winger

Team information
- Current team: Hamilton Academical
- Number: 10

Youth career
- Rangers

Senior career*
Years	Team	Apps	(Gls)
2018–2019	Queen's Park	5	(0)
2019–2022	Hibernian	3	(0)
2021–2022	→ Ayr United (loan)	13	(2)
2022	→ Dundalk (loan)	32	(6)
2022–2024	Livingston	33	(1)
2024–	Hamilton Academical	55	(5)
- * Club domestic league appearances and goals as of 4 May 2026

Steven Bradley (born 17 March 2002) is a Scottish professional footballer who plays as a winger for Scottish League One club Hamilton Academical.

== Career ==
Bradley was in the Rangers youth system, playing alongside Nathan Patterson, but was released after six years. After a period in boys' club football he signed with Queen's Park. He started his senior career there and made five appearances in League Two during the 2018–19 season.

Bradley signed a three-year contract with Hibernian in July 2019, and he made his professional debut on 12 December 2020 in a Scottish Premiership game against Hamilton Academical. He had previously played for the Hibs first team in League Cup matches against Forfar Athletic and Dundee.

On 6 September 2021, Bradley signed a new three-year deal with Hibernian, then joined Ayr United on a season-long loan. On 3 January 2022, Bradley was recalled by his parent club Hibernian. He subsequently joined League of Ireland Premier Division side Dundalk on a season long loan deal. Bradley scored four goals in his first three appearances for the club, helping him win the Player of the Month award for February.

On 14 December 2022, Scottish Premiership club Livingston announced that Bradley had signed a 2 1/2-year deal, though he could not play until 1 January 2023.

On 15 October 2023, Bradley received his first call up to the Scotland under-21 team ahead of their game against Malta.

In May 2024 Livngston announced that Bradley had been transfer listed following their relegation from the Premiership, and subsequently he was released from his contract in order to sign for Hamilton. He signed a two-year deal with the Accies.

== Career statistics ==
As of 5 April 2025

Club	Season	League			National cup (Note: Includes FAI Cup, Scottish Cup)		League cup (Note: Includes Scottish League Cup)		Other		Total	
Club	Season	Division	Apps	Goals	Apps	Goals	Apps	Goals	Apps	Goals	Apps	Goals
Queen's Park	2018–19	Scottish League Two	5	0	0	0	0	0	0	0	5	0
Hibernian	2019–20	Scottish Premiership	—		—		—		—		—	
Hibernian	2020–21	Scottish Premiership	2	0	0	0	2	0	—		4	0
Hibernian	2021–22	Scottish Premiership	1	0	0	0	0	0	0	0	1	0
Hibernian	Total		3	0	0	0	2	0	0	0	5	0
Ayr United (loan)	2021–22	Scottish Championship	13	2	1	0	0	0	1 (Note: One appearance in the Scottish Challenge Cup)	0	15	2
Dundalk (loan)	2022	League of Ireland Premier Division	32	6	2	0	—		—		34	6
Livingston	2022–23	Scottish Premiership	16	1	2	2	—		0	0	18	3
Livingston	2023–24	Scottish Premiership	17	0	1	0	—		—		18	0
Livingston	Total		33	1	3	2	0	0	0	0	36	3
Hamilton Academical	2024–25	Scottish Championship	28	2	3	0	4	1	2	0	37	3
Career total			114	11	9	2	6	1	3	0	132	14

== Honours ==
=== Individual ===
- League of Ireland Premier Division Player of the Month: February 2022,
