= Runar Hauge =

Norwegian footballer (born 2001)

Personal information
- Date of birth: 1 September 2001 (age 25)
- Place of birth: Bodø, Norway
- Height: 1.75 m (5 ft 9 in)
- Position: Winger

Team information
- Current team: Hobro
- Number: 11

Senior career*
Years	Team	Apps	(Gls)
2017–2021	Bodø/Glimt	11	(0)
2020	→ Grorud (loan)	10	(2)
2021	→ Stjørdals-Blink (loan)	23	(3)
2022–2023	Hibernian	2	(0)
2022	→ Dundalk (loan)	9	(2)
2023–2025	Jerv	39	(4)
2025–	Hobro	25	(6)

International career
2016	Norway U15	4	(1)
2017	Norway U16	15	(3)
2018	Norway U17	7	(0)
2019	Norway U18	7	(0)
- * Club domestic league appearances and goals as of 2 June 2026

Runar Hauge (born 1 September 2001) is a Norwegian professional footballer who plays for Danish 1st Division side Hobro IK as a winger. He has previously played for Bodø/Glimt, Grorud, Stjørdals-Blink in Norway, Scottish club Hibernian, and for Irish club Dundalk. Hauge represented Norway in youth internationals up to the under-18 level.

== Club career ==
Hauge began his club career with Bodø/Glimt.

In January 2022 he was linked with a transfer to Scottish club Hibernian, and he signed for the club on 31 January. Hauge and Norwegian compatriot Elias Melkersen made their Hibernian debuts on 2 March 2022, both appearing as substitutes. Hauge was loaned to Irish club Dundalk in July 2022. He made his debut on 29 July 2022, in a 4–0 FAI Cup win over Longford Town at Oriel Park.

Hauge returned to Norwegian football in July 2023, moving on a free transfer to Jerv.

On 25 August 2025, Hauge joined Danish 1st Division side Hobro IK on a 3-year contract.

== International career ==
Hauge is a Norway youth international.

== Personal life ==
Hauge is the younger brother of fellow footballer Jens Petter Hauge.

== Career statistics ==
As of 13 November 2022

Appearances and goals by club, season and competition
Club	Season	League			National Cup		League Cup		Other		Total	
Club	Season	Division	Apps	Goals	Apps	Goals	Apps	Goals	Apps	Goals	Apps	Goals
Bodø/Glimt	2017	1. divisjon	1	0	0	0	–		–		1	0
Bodø/Glimt	2018	Eliteserien	0	0	0	0	–		–		0	0
Bodø/Glimt	2019	Eliteserien	2	0	2	0	—		–		4	0
Bodø/Glimt	2020	Eliteserien	8	0	0	0	—		–		8	0
Bodø/Glimt	2021	Eliteserien	0	0	0	0	—		–		0	0
Bodø/Glimt	Total		11	0	2	0	0	0	0	0	13	0
Grorud (loan)	2020	1. divisjon	10	2	0	0	—		–		10	2
Stjørdals-Blink (loan)	2021	1. divisjon	15	1	0	0	—		–		15	1
Hibernian	2021–22	Scottish Premiership	2	0	0	0	0	0	–		2	0
Hibernian	2022–23	Scottish Premiership	0	0	0	0	1	0	–		1	0
Hibernian	Total		2	0	0	0	1	0	0	0	3	0
Dundalk (loan)	2022	League of Ireland Premier Division	9	2	2	0	—		–		11	2
Career total			47	5	4	0	1	0	0	0	51	5

== Honours ==
=== Club ===
Bodø/Glimt

- Eliteserien (1): 2020
