= Greg Sloggett =

Irish footballer (born 1996)

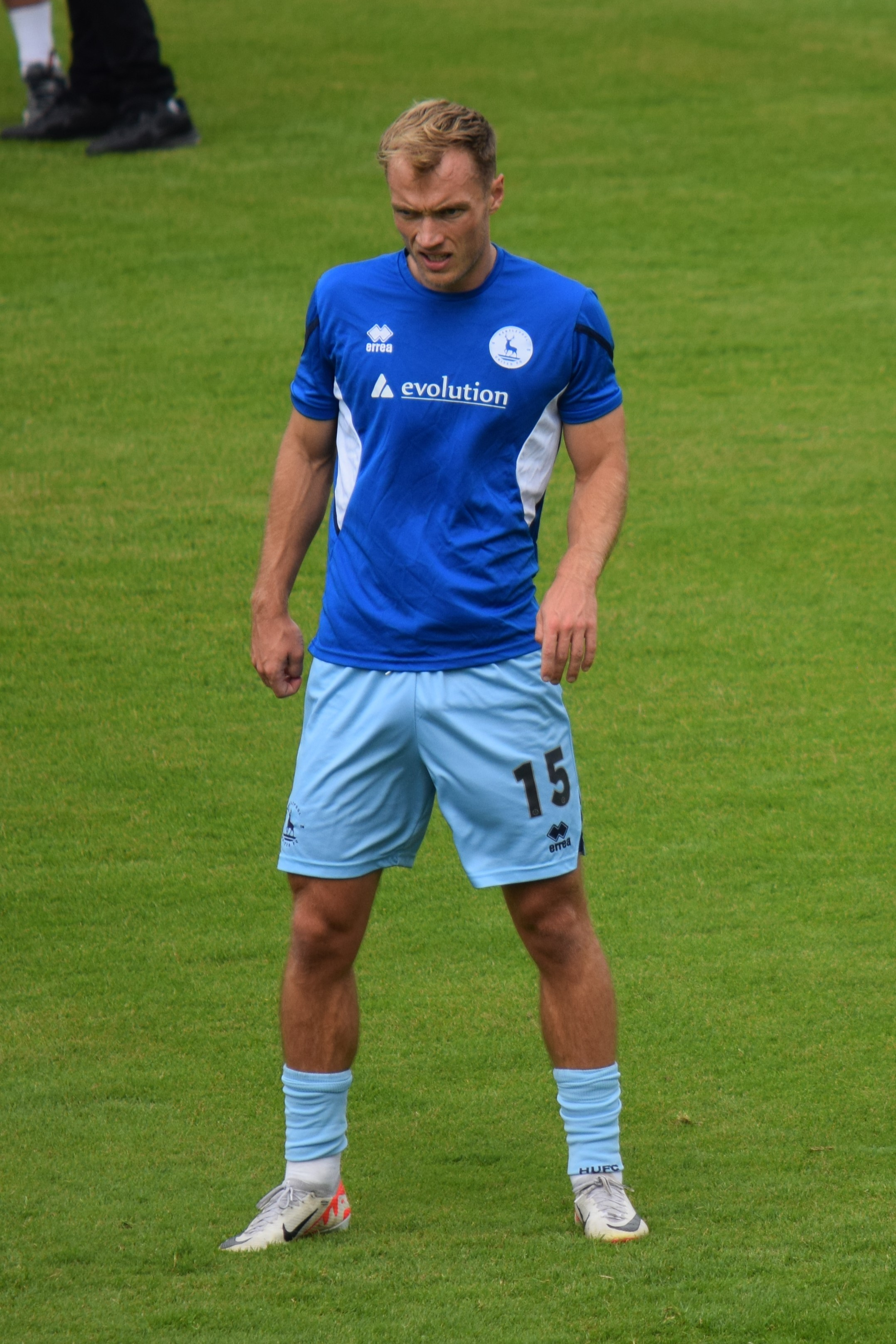
- Sloggett warming up for Hartlepool United in 2024

Personal information
- Date of birth: 3 July 1996 (age 30)
- Place of birth: Gormanston, Ireland
- Height: 1.88 m (6 ft 2 in)
- Position: Midfielder

Team information
- Current team: Glentoran

Senior career*
Years	Team	Apps	(Gls)
2014–2018	UCD	75	(6)
2019	Derry City	34	(1)
2020–2023	Dundalk	102	(4)
2024	Cheltenham Town	2	(0)
2024–2025	Hartlepool United	18	(0)
2025	→ Boston United (loan)	9	(0)
2025–2026	Boston United	39	(3)
2026–	Glentoran	5	(0)
- * Club domestic league appearances and goals as of 15:18, 9 October 2026 (UTC)

Gregory Sloggett (born 3 July 1996) is an Irish professional footballer who plays as a midfielder for NIFL Premiership club Glentoran.

== Career ==
Born in Gormanston, Sloggett began his career with UCD, before signing for Derry City for the 2019 season, where he turned professional. He was an important player for the club, but left to sign for Dundalk for the 2020 season. He made 160 appearances in all competitions for Dundalk, which included 16 appearances in the UEFA Europa League.

After a trial with the club, Sloggett signed for League One side Cheltenham Town in February 2024. He was released by the club at the end of the 2023–24 season.

On 15 July 2024, he signed for National League side Hartlepool United. On 25 March 2025, Sloggett joined fellow National League club Boston United on loan until the end of the 2024–25 season. At the end of the 2024–25 season, it was announced that he would be released by Hartlepool at the end of his contract.

Sloggett rejoined Boston United in July 2025 on a permanent deal.

On 2 July 2026, Sloggett signed for NIFL Premiership club Glentoran on a two-year-contract.

== Personal life ==
His girlfriend Chloe Mustaki is also a footballer.

== Career statistics ==
As of 9 October 2026

Appearances and goals by club, season and competition
Club	Season	League			National Cup (Note: Includes FA Cup, FAI Cup & Irish Cup)		League Cup (Note: Includes League of Ireland Cup, EFL Cup, National League Cup & Northern Ireland Football League Cup)		Other		Total	
Club	Season	Division	Apps	Goals	Apps	Goals	Apps	Goals	Apps	Goals	Apps	Goals
UCD	2014	LOI Premier Division	4	0	0	0	0	0	1 (Note: Appearance in play-offs)	0	5	0
UCD	2015	LOI First Division	5	0	0	0	1	0	0	0	6	0
UCD	2016	LOI First Division	22	4	1	0	0	0	0	0	23	4
UCD	2017	LOI First Division	24	1	0	0	1	0	0	0	25	1
UCD	2018	LOI First Division	20	1	2	0	0	0	0	0	22	1
UCD	Total		75	6	3	0	2	0	1	0	81	6
Derry City	2019	LOI Premier Division	34	1	0	0	0	0	0	0	34	1
Dundalk	2020	LOI Premier Division	14	2	4	0	–		8 (Note: Appearances in the UEFA Europa League)	0	26	2
Dundalk	2021	LOI Premier Division	29	1	4	0	–		5 (Note: Four appearances in the UEFA Champions League; one appearance in the President of Ireland's Cup)	0	38	1
Dundalk	2022	LOI Premier Division	32	1	2	2	–		0	0	34	3
Dundalk	2023	LOI Premier Division	27	0	1	0	–		4 (Note: Appearances in the UEFA Champions League)	1	32	1
Dundalk	Total		102	4	11	2	0	0	17	1	130	7
Cheltenham Town	2023–24	League One	2	0	0	0	0	0	0	0	2	0
Hartlepool United	2024–25	National League	18	0	2	0	0	0	0	0	20	0
Boston United (loan)	2024–25	National League	9	0	0	0	0	0	0	0	9	0
Boston United	2025–26	National League	39	3	1	0	4	0	0	0	40	3
Glentoran	2026–27	NIFL Premiership	5	0	0	0	0	0	0	0	5	0
Career total			284	14	17	2	6	0	18	1	321	17

== Honours ==
Dundalk

- FAI Cup: 2020
- President of Ireland's Cup: 2021
