= Sonni Nattestad =

Faroese footballer

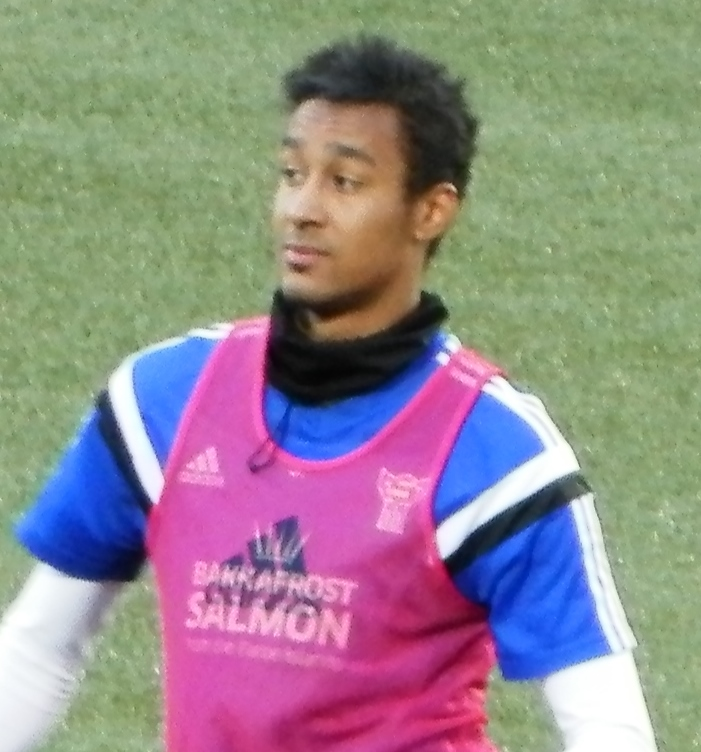
- Nattestad in 2015

Personal information
- Full name: Sonni Ragnar Nattestad
- Date of birth: 5 August 1994 (age 32)
- Place of birth: Tórshavn, Faroe Islands
- Height: 1.97 m (6 ft 6 in)
- Position: Centre-back

Team information
- Current team: 07 Vestur
- Number: 5

Senior career*
Years	Team	Apps	(Gls)
2010	MB	1	(0)
2011–2012	07 Vestur	22	(4)
2013–2015	Midtjylland	4	(0)
2014–2015	→ Horsens (loan)	13	(2)
2015	→ Vejle BK (loan)	7	(0)
2016	FH Hafnarfjordur	1	(0)
2016	→ Fylkir (loan)	8	(0)
2016–2018	Molde 2	4	(0)
2018	→ Aalesund (loan)	13	(1)
2018	→ Horsens (loan)	4	(0)
2019	Fredericia	8	(1)
2020	B36	22	(3)
2021	Dundalk	14	(0)
2022	FK Jerv	0	(0)
2022–2023	B36	44	(2)
2024–	07 Vestur	25	(1)

International career^{‡}
2010–2012	Faroe Islands U19	9	(0)
2013	Faroe Islands U21	6	(0)
2013–	Faroe Islands	49	(3)
- * Club domestic league appearances and goals as of 26 October 2025 ‡ National team caps and goals as of 5 August 2026

Sonni Ragnar Nattestad (born 5 August 1994) is a Faroese professional footballer who plays as a centre-back for 07 Vestur and the Faroe Islands national team.

== Career ==
=== Club ===
On 12 December 2016, Nattestad signed for Norwegian Eliteserien club Molde FK.

Nattestad joined Danish 1st Division club FC Fredericia on 1 February 2019. After a half year, on 10 September 2019, Nattestad got his contract terminated.

In January 2021 he signed for the League of Ireland Premier Division side Dundalk. He made his competitive debut for the club on 12 March 2021 in the 2021 President's Cup against league champions Shamrock Rovers at Tallaght Stadium. The game was an eventful one for Nattestad as he opened the scoring in the 42nd minute with a header from a Patrick McEleney corner, before being sent-off in the 59th minute for a tackle on Graham Burke as his side went on to draw 1–1 before winning the trophy on penalties.

On 2 January 2022, Nattestad signed a contract with Norwegian Eliteserien club FK Jerv. However, the contract was terminated just 2 hours later.

In March 2024, Nattestad returned to 07 Vestur.

== International career ==
Nattestad was born in the Faroe Islands to a Haitian-born father who was adopted in the Faroe Islands, and Faroese mother. He represents the Faroe Islands national team.

== Career statistics ==
=== International ===
As of match played 13 October 2024

Appearances and goals by national team and year
National team	Year	Apps	Goals
Faroe Islands	2013	1	0
Faroe Islands	2014	5	0
Faroe Islands	2015	6	0
Faroe Islands	2016	5	1
Faroe Islands	2017	1	0
Faroe Islands	2018	7	1
Faroe Islands	2019	–	
Faroe Islands	2020	6	0
Faroe Islands	2021	9	1
Faroe Islands	2022	6	0
Faroe Islands	2023	2	0
Faroe Islands	2024	1	0
Total		49	3

Scores and results list the Faroe Islands' goal tally first, score column indicates score after each Nattestad goal.

List of international goals scored by Sonni Nattestad
No.	Date	Venue	Opponent	Score	Result	Competition
1	7 October 2016	Skonto Stadium, Riga, Latvia	Latvia	1–0	2–0	2018 FIFA World Cup qualification
2	25 March 2018	Estadio Municipal de Marbella, Marbella, Spain	Liechtenstein	3–0	3–0	Friendly
3	28 March 2021	Ernst-Happel-Stadion, Vienna, Austria	Austria	1–0	1–3	2022 FIFA World Cup qualification

== Honours ==
Dundalk

- President of Ireland's Cup: 2021
