= Patrick Devlin =

Patrick Devlin may refer to:

- Pat Devlin (American football) (born 1988), American football quarterback
- Pat Devlin (footballer) (born 1953), Irish footballer and manager
- Patrick Devlin, Baron Devlin (1905–1992), British law lord
- L. Patrick Devlin, professor of communication at the University of Rhode Island
- Paddy Devlin (1925–1999), Northern Irish politician
