= Ryan O'Kane (footballer) =

Irish footballer (born 2003)

Personal information
- Full name: Ryan O'Kane
- Date of birth: 16 August 2003 (age 23)
- Place of birth: Dundalk, Ireland
- Height: 1.72 m (5 ft 8 in)
- Position: Winger

Team information
- Current team: Sligo Rovers
- Number: 28

Youth career
- Glenmuir
- Rock Celtic
- –2018: Bellurgan United
- 2018–2019: Home Farm

Senior career*
Years	Team	Apps	(Gls)
2019–2020	Warrenpoint Town	3	(0)
2020–2021	Cliftonville	0	(0)
2021–2024	Dundalk	93	(8)
2025	Shelbourne	5	(0)
2025	→ Sligo Rovers (loan)	11	(2)
2026–	Sligo Rovers	20	(2)
- * Club domestic league appearances and goals as of 11:34, 10 November 2026 (UTC)

Ryan O'Kane (born 16 August 2003) is an Irish professional footballer who plays as winger for League of Ireland Premier Division club Sligo Rovers.

== Career ==
=== Youth career ===
Born and raised in Dundalk, O'Kane played with local clubs Glenmuir, Rock Celtic, and Bellurgan United, before being called up to the Dundalk Schoolboys League's representative side for the SuperCupNI in 2018, in which he scored 3 goals in 5 appearances before being named Junior Player of the Tournament. He then moved to one of Dublin's top academy sides Home Farm before earning a move to NIFL Premiership club Warrenpoint Town.

=== Warrenpoint Town ===
O'Kane made his senior debut for Warrenpoint Town on 10 August 2019, aged just 15, when he came off the bench for the final 20 minutes against Larne. He made a further 2 senior appearances for the club but made no more after manager Stephen McDonnell was sacked, with O'Kane being released at the end of the season.

=== Cliftonville ===
In July 2020, O'Kane signed for fellow NIFL Premiership club Cliftonville, but struggled to make a breakthrough at the club and became disillusioned with the game, to the point of considering quitting professional football, before being released in early 2021 without having made a senior appearance for the club.

=== Dundalk ===
On 19 February 2021, O'Kane signed a 3-year professional contract with his hometown League of Ireland Premier Division club Dundalk, the club which his grandfather Tony was previously the chairman of. He made his debut for the club on 26 March 2021, coming off the bench in a 2–1 defeat to Finn Harps at Oriel Park. O'Kane made his first career appearance in Europe on 13 July 2021, replacing Daniel Kelly in the 69th minute of a 1–0 win away to Welsh side Newtown in the UEFA Europa Conference League. He made 10 appearances in all competitions during his first season with the club. He scored his first career goal in senior football on 26 August 2022, when he equalised in the 76th minute away to Wexford in the FAI Cup, as his side went on to win 3–2 after extra time at Ferrycarrig Park. On 7 October 2022, he scored his first league goal for the club, in a 2–1 defeat to St Patrick's Athletic at Oriel Park. On 24 October 2022, he signed a new 2-year contract with the club. On 1 May 2023, O'Kane scored his sides second goal of the game in a 2–0 win away to UCD, finding the top left corner from 25 yards. In the summer of 2023, he featured in all 4 of his sides UEFA Europa Conference League games as they knocked out Bruno's Magpies of Gibraltar before being knocked out by KA of Iceland. He was named the club's Young Player of the Year for 2023. On 19 July 2024, he made his 100th appearance for the club, in a 2–1 defeat at away to Drogheda United in the FAI Cup. O'Kane made 36 appearances in all competitions in 2024, scoring 4 goals as his club were relegated to the League of Ireland First Division, ending a 16-year spell in the top flight.

=== Shelbourne ===
On 26 November 2024, it was announced that O'Kane had signed a long-term contract with Damien Duff's Shelbourne. He made his debut for the club on 7 February 2025, replacing Harry Wood from the bench in the 72nd minute of the 2025 President of Ireland's Cup which his side defeated Drogheda United to earn the first medal of his senior career. Having made just 5 substitute appearances in the league by June 2025, O'Kane was sent out on loan in search of more regular first team football.

=== Sligo Rovers ===
On 1 July 2025, O'Kane joined fellow League of Ireland Premier Division club Sligo Rovers on loan until the end of the season. On 25 July 2025, he scored his first goal for the club, with an 89th-minute winner to complete his side's comeback from 2–0 down to win the game 3–2 away to relegation rivals Cork City at Turners Cross. He scored 2 goals in 14 appearances in all competitions during his loan spell with the club, as he helped them to secure their Premier Division status on the final day of the season. On 13 December 2025, it was announced that O'Kane had signed for Sligo Rovers on a two-year contract on a permanent basis, for an undisclosed fee. On 16 March 2026, O'Kane suffered a double fracture to his arm in a 1–0 defeat away to his former club Dundalk, with the injury requiring surgery, the recovery period keeping him out of action until May. O'Kane scored a total of 2 goals in 21 appearances in all competitions in 2026 as the club finished bottom of the league and were relegated to play in the League of Ireland First Division for the first time since 2006.

== Career statistics ==
As of match played on 30 October 2026

Appearances and goals by club, season and competition
Club	Season	League			National Cup (Note: Includes Irish Cup & FAI Cup)		Europe		Other		Total	
Club	Season	Division	Apps	Goals	Apps	Goals	Apps	Goals	Apps	Goals	Apps	Goals
Warrenpoint Town	2019–20	NIFL Premiership	3	0	0	0	–		–		3	0
Cliftonville	2020–21	NIFL Premiership	0	0	0	0	–		0 (Note: Appearance(s) in the County Antrim Shield)	0	0	0
Dundalk	2021	LOI Premier Division	8	0	1	0	1 (Note: Appearance(s) in the UEFA Europa Conference League)	0	1 (Note: Appearance(s) in the President of Ireland's Cup)	0	10	0
Dundalk	2022	LOI Premier Division	18	2	3	1	—		—		21	3
Dundalk	2023	LOI Premier Division	34	3	3	0	4	0	1 (Note: Appearance(s) in the Leinster Senior Cup)	0	42	3
Dundalk	2024	LOI Premier Division	33	3	1	0	—		2	1	36	4
Dundalk	Total		93	8	8	1	5	0	3	1	109	10
Shelbourne	2025	LOI Premier Division	5	0	—		—		1	0	6	0
Sligo Rovers (loan)	2025	LOI Premier Division	11	2	3	0	—		—		14	2
Sligo Rovers	2026	LOI Premier Division	20	2	1	0	—		—		21	2
Career Total			132	12	12	1	5	0	4	1	153	14

== Honours ==
=== Club ===
Shelbourne

- President of Ireland's Cup: 2025

=== Individual ===
- Dundalk Young Player of the Year: 2023
