= 2022 Dundalk F.C. season =

Dundalk
2022 season
- Head Coach: Stephen O'Donnell
- Premier Division: 3rd of 10
- FAI Cup: Quarter-final
- Top goalscorer: League: Patrick Hoban (9); All: Patrick Hoban (10)
- Highest home attendance: 3,546 v Shamrock Rovers, 14 March 2022 (Note: The opening night fixture against Derry City was sold out and therefore had a higher attendance but an official attendance figure was not reported)
Home colours	Away colours	Third colours

Dundalk entered the 2022 season having finished in sixth place in the league the previous season and having failed to qualify for European football for the first time since the 2012 season. They were still the League of Ireland Cup holders because, after they had won it in 2019, the competition was not held in 2020 or 2021. 2022 was Dundalk's 14th consecutive season in the top tier of Irish football, their 87th in all, and their 96th in the League of Ireland. The 100th anniversary of the club's entry to the Leinster Senior League and therefore its first match as a senior club passed on 7 October 2022.

Stephen O'Donnell was the club's new head coach going into the new term, having replaced Vinny Perth in the close season.

== Season summary ==
The league season started on 18 February 2022. Dundalk moved into third position after the round 15 victory over Bohemians and remained in the top three—the automatic European qualification positions—for the remainder of the season. A run of one defeat in 15 games from round 12 to round 26 saw an unlikely title challenge develop but injuries to several key players and mixed results subsequently saw that challenge fade in the final series of matches. A home victory over Bohemians in round 35 guaranteed third place and qualification for the 2023–24 UEFA Europa Conference League.

A notable milestone was reached in round five away to Shelbourne, when Patrick Hoban scored to become the first player to score 100 league goals in the club's history. Another milestone was reached in round 18, when the club achieved its 1,000th league victory in the top tier of the League of Ireland with a win at home to St Patrick's Athletic. For the round 12 home fixture against Shelbourne, the team wore a specially commissioned shirt in aid of the Motor Neurone Disease charity, 'Watch Your Back'. The match-worn shirts were subsequently auctioned with all proceeds going to the charity.

The club's Honorary President, Des Casey, died in August. The club renamed Oriel Park 'Casey's Field' in his honour until the end of the season because Oriel is built on land that has been leased from the Casey Family Trust since 1936.

In the FAI Cup, they were defeated in the quarter-final by First Division side Waterford.

The end of the season saw club captain Brian Gartland retire after 10 seasons having made 251 appearances for the club.

=== First-Team Squad (2022) ===
Sources: Note: Substitute appearances in brackets

No.	Name	DOB	Pos.	Debut	League		FAI Cup		Others		Totals	
No.	Name	DOB	Pos.	Debut	Apps	Goals	Apps	Goals	Apps	Goals	Apps	Goals
1	(Wales) Nathan Shepperd	10 September 2000	GK	2022	33	0	3	0	0	0	36	0
2	(Scotland) Lewis Macari (Note: on full season loan from Stoke City F.C.)	8 February 2002	DF	2022	33 (1)	1	3	0	0	0	37	1
3	(Republic of Ireland) Brian Gartland	4 November 1986	DF	2013	4 (1)	0	1	0	0	0	6	0
4	(Republic of Ireland) Andy Boyle	7 March 1991	DF	2013	31 (1)	0	3	0	0	0	35	0
5	(Republic of Ireland) Mark Connolly (Note: loan from Dundee United F.C. ended after Round 23)	16 December 1991	DF	2022	20	1	0	0	0	0	20	1
5	(England) Alfie Lewis (Note: signed ahead of Round 25 and assigned squad number 5 vacated by Mark Connolly)	28 September 1999	MF	2022	11 (1)	1	1 (1)	0	0	0	14	1
6	(England) Sam Bone	6 February 1998	DF	2022	23 (9)	1	2 (1)	0	0	0	35	1
7	(Republic of Ireland) Daniel Kelly	21 May 1996	MF	2019	20 (3)	6	0	0	0	0	23	6
8	(Republic of Ireland) Robbie Benson	7 May 1992	MF	2016	19 (10)	3	1 (1)	1	0	0	31	4
9	(Republic of Ireland) Patrick Hoban	28 July 1991	FW	2013	21 (4)	9	1	1	0	0	26	10
10	(Republic of Ireland) Greg Sloggett	3 July 1996	MF	2020	30 (2)	1	3	2	0	0	35	3
11	(Republic of Ireland) John Martin	5 January 1999	MF	2022	10 (21)	2	1 (2)	0	0	0	34	2
14	(Scotland) Peter Cherrie	1 October 1983	GK	2009	3	0	0	0	0	0	3	0
15	(Republic of Ireland) Darragh Leahy	15 April 1998	DF	2020	28	3	1	0	0	0	29	3
16	(Scotland) Steven Bradley (Note: on full season loan from Hibernian F.C.)	17 March 2002	MF	2022	23 (9)	6	3	0	0	0	35	6
17	(Republic of Ireland) Keith Ward	12 October 1990	MF	2011	10 (22)	5	2 (1)	1	0	0	35	6
18	(Republic of Ireland) Robert McCourt (Note: signed ahead of Round 25)	6 April 1998	DF	2022	2 (1)	0	1	0	0	0	4	0
19	(Wales) Daniel Williams (Note: loan from Swansea City A.F.C. ended after Round 18)	19 April 2001	MF	2022	7 (3)	0	0	0	0	0	10	0
20	(Wales) Joe Adams	13 February 2001	MF	2022	20 (13)	0	1 (1)	1	0	0	35	1
21	(Republic of Ireland) Paul Doyle	10 April 1998	MF	2022	16 (9)	2	2	1	0	0	27	3
22	(Norway) Runar Hauge (Note: on loan from Hibernian F.C. from Round 25)	1 September 2001	MF	2022	5 (4)	2	2 (1)	0	0	0	12	2
23	(Republic of Ireland) John Mountney	22 February 1993	MF	2012	7 (3)	0	1 (2)	0	0	0	13	0
24	(Republic of Ireland) Mayowa Animasahun (Note: on loan to Dungannon Swifts after Round 25)	8 August 2003	DF	2021	0	0	0	0	0	0	0	0
25	(Republic of Ireland) Mark Hanratty (Note: released after Round 24)	18 July 2002	MF	2020	1 (2)	0	0	0	0	0	3	0
28	(Republic of Ireland) Ryan O'Kane	16 August 2003	MF	2021	10 (8)	2	0 (3)	1	0	0	21	3
29	(Republic of Ireland) David McMillan	14 December 1988	FW	2015	9 (18)	2	1 (1)	1	0	0	29	3

== Competitions ==
Win Draw Loss

=== Premier Division ===
18 February 2022 Round 1	Dundalk	2–2	Derry City	Oriel Park
19:45	Steven Bradley 32'; Mark Connolly 73'	Report	Thomson 40'; McGonigle 78'	Attendance: 3,500 (est); Referee: Rob Harvey

25 February 2022 Round 2	Bohemians	2–2	Dundalk	Phibsborough, Dublin
19:45	Flores 28'; Promise 44'	Report	Patrick Hoban 30'; Steven Bradley 56'	Stadium: Dalymount Park; Attendance: Unreported; Referee: Paul McLaughlin

28 February 2022 Round 3	Dundalk	3–0	Finn Harps	Oriel Park
19:45	Steven Bradley 44', 67'; Sam Bone 46'	Report		Attendance: 2,676; Referee: John McLoughlin

5 March 2022 Round 4	Sligo Rovers	0–0	Dundalk	Sligo
19:45		Report		Stadium: The Showgrounds; Attendance: 3,257; Referee: Neil Doyle

12 March 2022 Round 5	Shelbourne	1–1	Dundalk	Drumcondra, Dublin
19:45	Boyd 85' (pen.)	Report	Patrick Hoban 70'	Stadium: Tolka Park; Attendance: Unreported; Referee: Derek Tomney

14 March 2022 Round 6	Dundalk	0–0	Shamrock Rovers	Oriel Park
19:45				Attendance: 3,546; Referee: Damien MacGraith

19 March 2022 Round 7	Drogheda United	1–0	Dundalk	Drogheda
19:45	Williams 50' (pen.)	Report		Stadium: Head in the Game Park; Attendance: unreported Referee: Rob Hennessy

1 April 2022 Round 8	Dundalk	2–0	U.C.D.	Oriel Park
19:45	Daniel Kelly 16'; Patrick Hoban 48'	Report		Attendance: 2,053; Referee: Gavin Colfer

8 April 2022 Round 9	St Patrick's Athletic	0–0	Dundalk	Inchicore, Dublin
19:45		Report		Stadium: Richmond Park; Attendance: 4,322; Referee: Rob Harvey

15 April 2022 Round 10	Dundalk	2–1	Sligo Rovers	Oriel Park
19:45	Patrick Hoban 34'; Daniel Kelly 43'	Report	Mata 86'	Attendance: 2,516; Referee: Neil Doyle

18 April 2022 Round 11	Shamrock Rovers	1–0	Dundalk	Tallaght, Dublin
19:00	Danny Mandroiu 66'	Report	Brian Gartland (red card) 88'	Stadium: Tallaght Stadium; Attendance: 5,532; Referee: Ray Matthews

22 April 2022 Round 12	Dundalk	2–1	Shelbourne	Oriel Park
19:45	Steven Bradley (red card) 56'; Daniel Kelly 64'; John Martin 85'	Report	Shane Griffin (red card) 45'; Shane Farrell 80' (pen.)	Attendance: 2,427; Referee: Paul McLaughlin

29 April 2022 Round 13	Dundalk	4–1	Drogheda United	Oriel Park
19:45	Leahy 39'; Macari 51'; Hoban 58' (pen.); Martin 90+2'	Report	Nugent (yellow card) 38'; Deegan (yellow card) 65'; Brennan 87'; Heeney (yellow card) 89'	Attendance: 2,832; Referee: Sean Grant

6 May 2022 Round 14	U.C.D.	2–2	Dundalk	Belfield, Dublin
19:45	Whelan 60', 75' (pen.)	Report	Paul Doyle 18'; Andy Boyle (red card) 45'; Patrick Hoban 54' (pen.)	Stadium: UCD Bowl; Attendance: Unreported; Referee: Damien MacGraith

13 May 2022 Round 15	Dundalk	3–1	Bohemians	Oriel Park
19:45	Patrick Hoban 50'; Robbie Benson 71'; Paul Doyle 79'	Report	Ciaran Kelly 115'	Attendance: 2,748; Referee: Sean Grant

20 May 2022 Round 16	Derry City	1–2	Dundalk	Derry
19:45	Akintunde 76'	Report	Robbie Benson 10'; Patrick Hoban 82'	Stadium: Ryan McBride Brandywell Stadium; Attendance: Unreported; Referee: Rob Harvey

23 May 2022 Round 17	Finn Harps	0–1	Dundalk	Ballybofey, County Donegal
20:00		Report	Daniel Kelly 53'	Stadium: Finn Park; Attendance: Unreported; Referee: Rob Hennessy

27 May 2022 Round 18	Dundalk	1–0	St Patrick's Athletic	Oriel Park
19:45	Daniel Kelly 24'	Report		Attendance: 2,889; Referee: Ray Matthews

17 June 2022 Round 19	Dundalk	1–0	Shamrock Rovers	Oriel Park
19:45	Robbie Benson 80'	Report	Ronan Finn (red card) 82'	Attendance: 3,409; Referee: Neil Doyle

24 June 2022 Round 20	Shelbourne	0–0	Dundalk	Drumcondra, Dublin
19:45		Report		Stadium: Tolka Park; Attendance: Unreported

1 July 2022 Round 21	Dundalk	3–0	U.C.D.	Oriel Park
19:45	David McMillan 51'; Greg Sloggett 57'; Keith Ward 90'	Report		Attendance: 2,241; Referee: Rob Harvey

8 July 2022 Round 22	Drogheda United	1–0	Dundalk	Drogheda
19:45	Williams 1'	Report		Stadium: Head in the Game Park; Attendance: 2,158; Referee: Neil Doyle

16 July 2022 Round 23	St Patrick's Athletic	1–1	Dundalk	Inchicore, Dublin
19:45	Eoin Doyle 15'	Report	Daniel Kelly 77'	Stadium: Richmond Park; Attendance: Unreported; Referee: Rob Hennessey

22 July 2022 Round 24	Dundalk	3–0	Finn Harps	Oriel Park
19:45	Darragh Leahy 3'; Keith Ward 6'; Steven Bradley 36'	Report		Attendance: 2,016; Referee: Adriano Reale

6 August 2022 Round 25	Dundalk	1–1	Derry City	Oriel Park
19:45	Patrick Hoban 90'	Report	Akintunde 12'	Attendance: 2,856; Referee: Rob Hennessy

12 August 2022 Round 26	Bohemians	0–1	Dundalk	Phibsborough, Dublin
19:45 GMT	Levingston (yellow card) }77'	Report	Martin 45' (yellow card) 13'; Boyle (red card) 52'; Bone (yellow card) 68'; Shepperd (yellow card) 84'	Stadium: Dalymount Park; Attendance: 3,400 (est); Referee: Adriano Reale

21 August 2022 Round 27	Shamrock Rovers	3–0	Dundalk	Tallaght, Dublin
19:00	Greene 13'; Towell 34'; Gaffney 67'	Report		Stadium: Tallaght Stadium; Attendance: 5,525; Referee: Rob Harvey

29 August 2022 Round 28	Sligo Rovers	0–3 (Note: Sligo Rovers won the match 2–0 but the result was subsequently overturned because Sligo had fielded a suspended player)	Dundalk	Sligo
19:45	Boyle o.g. 57'; Liivak 83'	Report	Darragh Leahy (red card) 23'	Stadium: The Showgrounds; Attendance: Unreported; Referee: John McLoughlin

2 September 2022 Round 29	Dundalk	0–0	Shelbourne	Casey's Field
19:45		Report		Attendance: 2,343; Referee: Paul McLaughlin

9 September 2022 Round 30	U.C.D.	3–2	Dundalk	Belfield, Dublin
19:45	Lonergan 51', 87'; Duffy 79'	Report	Keith Ward 39'; Steven Bradley 57'	Stadium: UCD Bowl; Attendance: Unreported; Referee: Adriano Reale

30 September 2022 Round 31	Dundalk	2–0	Drogheda United	Casey's Field
19:45	Runar Hauge 58' (pen.); Dane Massey o.g. 45'	Report	Brennan (red card) 90'	Attendance: 2,364; Referee: John McLoughlin

7 October 2022 Round 32	Dundalk	1–2	St Patrick's Athletic	Casey's Field
19:45	Ryan O'Kane 45'	Report	Chris Forrester 20'; Adam O'Reilly 90'	Attendance: 2,889; Referee: Damien MacGraith

14 October 2022 Round 33	Finn Harps	1–2	Dundalk	Ballybofey, County Donegal
20:00	Jones 86'	Report	Lewis Macari 18'; Slevin o.g. 43'	Stadium: Finn Park; Attendance: 1,103; Referee: Paul McLaughlin

21 October 2022 Round 34	Dundalk	3–3	Sligo Rovers	Casey's Field
19:45	Alfie Lewis 38'; Ryan O'Kane 54'; Keith Ward 90'	Report	Liivak 22'; Keena 76'; Mata 83'	Attendance: 2,384; Referee: Damian MacGraith

28 October 2022 Round 35	Dundalk	2–1	Bohemians	Casey's Field
19:45 IST	Mountney 22'; Hauge 39'; Boyle (yellow card) 33'; Leahy (yellow card) 69'; Shepperd (yellow card) 86'	Report	Varian 89'; Burt (yellow card) 90+2'	Attendance: 3,017; Referee: Adriano Reale

6 November 2022 Round 36	Derry City	0–1	Dundalk	Derry
19:00	Sadou Diallo (red card) 20'	Report	Keith Ward 9'; Robert McCourt (red card) 20'	Stadium: Ryan McBride Brandywell Stadium; Attendance: unreported Referee: Rob Hennessy

==== League table ====
Pos	Team	Pld	W	D	L	GF	GA	GD	Pts	Qualification or relegation
1	Shamrock Rovers (C)	36	24	7	5	61	22	+39	79	Qualification for Champions League first qualifying round
2	Derry City	36	18	12	6	53	27	+26	66	Qualification for Europa Conference League first qualifying round
3	Dundalk	36	18	12	6	53	30	+23	66	Qualification for Europa Conference League first qualifying round
4	St Patrick's Athletic	36	18	7	11	57	37	+20	61	Qualification for Europa Conference League first qualifying round
5	Sligo Rovers	36	13	10	13	47	44	+3	49	

Source: SSE Airtricity League, Soccerway
Rules for classification: 1) Points; 2) Goal difference; 3) Goals scored.
(C) Champions

=== FAI Cup ===
29 July 2022 First Round	Dundalk	4–0	Longford Town	Oriel Park
19:45	Greg Sloggett 59', 68'; Patrick Hoban 61'; Joe Adams 63'	Report		Attendance: 1,576; Referee: Alan Patchell

26 August 2022 Second Round	Wexford	2–3 (a.e.t.)	Dundalk	Ferrycarrig Park
19:45	Lovic 55'; Shortt 66'	Report	David McMillan 38'; Ryan O'Kane 73'; Robbie Benson 109' (pen.)	Attendance: Unreported; Referee: Adriano Reale

16 September 2022 Quarter-final	Waterford	3–2	Dundalk	Waterford Regional Sports Centre
19:45	Griffin 31'; Power 43'; Patterson 65'	Report	Paul Doyle 11'; Keith Ward 90'	Attendance: 2,612; Referee: Neil Doyle

== Awards ==
=== Player of the Month ===
Month	Player	Reference
February	(Scotland) Steven Bradley	
May	(Republic of Ireland) Daniel Kelly	
June	(Republic of Ireland) Mark Connolly	
